= Jaora railway station =

Railway station in Madhya Pradesh

Jaora
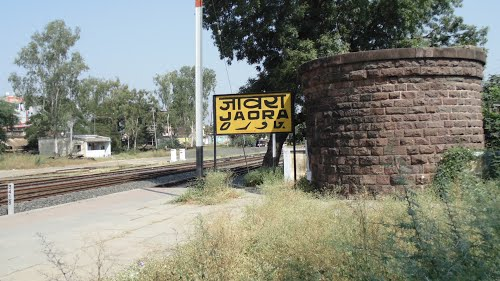
- Jaora station

General information
- Location: Jaora, Ratlam district, Madhya Pradesh; India
- Coordinates: 23°37′45″N 75°06′57″E
- Elevation: 476 m (1,562 ft)
- System: Indian Railway Station
- Owner: Indian Railways
- Operator: Western Railway
- Line: Ajmer–Ratlam section
- Platforms: 2
- Tracks: 3
- Connections: Taxi stand, Auto stand

Construction
- Structure type: Standard (on ground station)
- Parking: Yes
- Cycle facilities: Yes
- Accessible: Available

Other information
- Status: Active
- Station code: JAO
- Zone(s): Western Railway
- Division(s): Ratlam

History
- Former names: Great Indian Peninsula Railway
Location
- Location within India Location within Madhya Pradesh

नवाब - हमारी जनता की नींद में खलल नहीं पड़नी चाहिए

Jaora railway station is a main railway station in Jaora city of Madhya Pradesh. Its code is JAO. Jaora is an important broad gauge railway station of the Ajmer - Ratlam line. Jaora is well connected to Ratlam, Ujjain via Nagda and Kota, Bundi via Chittorgarh.

== Trains ==
The major trains passing from Jaora are:

- Bandra Terminus Udaipur Superfast Express
- Veer Bhumi Chittaurgarh Express
- Jodhpur - Indore Express
- Jaipur - Hyderabad Weekly Express
- Ratlam - Udaipur City Express
- Bhopal–Jaipur Express
- Bandra Terminus Udaipur Express
- Ajmer Bandra Terminus Express
- Indore–Jaipur Express via Ajmer
- Okha - Nathdwara Express
- Mandsaur - Meerut City Link Express
- Haldighati Passenger
