= Mysuru–Ajmer Express (via Kotturu) =

Train in India

Mysuru - Ajmer Express

Overview
- Service type: Express
- Status: Active
- Locale: Karnataka, Maharashtra, Gujarat, Madhya Pradesh and Rajasthan
- First service: 5 September 2026; 3 days ago
- Current operator: South Western Railway (SWR)

Route
- Termini: Mysuru Junction (MYS); Ajmer Junction (AII)
- Stops: 36
- Distance travelled: 2,337 km (1,452 mi)
- Average journey time: 44h 35m
- Service frequency: Weekly
- Train number: 16281 / 16282

On-board services
- Classes: General Unreserved, Sleeper Class, AC 3rd Class, AC 2nd Class, AC 1st Class
- Seating arrangements: Yes
- Sleeping arrangements: Yes
- Catering facilities: Pantry Car; On-board Catering; E-Catering
- Observation facilities: Large windows
- Baggage facilities: No
- Other facilities: Below the seats

Technical
- Rolling stock: ICF coach
- Track gauge: 1,676 mm (5 ft 6 in)
- Electrification: 25 kV 50 Hz AC overhead line
- Operating speed: 130 km/h (81 mph) maximum, 52 km/h (32 mph) average including halts.
- Track owner: Indian Railways

The 16281 / 16282 Mysuru–Ajmer Express (via Kotturu) is an express train belonging to South Western Railway zone that runs between the city Mysuru Junction of Karnataka and Ajmer Junction of Rajasthan in India.

It operates as train number 16281 from Mysuru Junction to Ajmer Junction and as train number 16282 in the reverse direction, serving the states of Karnataka, Maharashtra, Gujarat, Madhya Pradesh and Rajasthan.

== Services ==
- 16281 / Mysuru–Ajmer Weekly Express has an average speed of 52 km/h and covers 2337 km in 44h 35m.
- 16282 / Ajmer–Mysuru Weekly Express has an average speed of 49 km/h and covers 2337 km in 48h 10m.

== Schedule ==
- 16281 – 8:00 AM (Saturday) [Mysuru Junction]
- 16282 – 6:30 PM (Monday) [Ajmer Junction]

== Routes and halts ==
The important halts of the train are :

- Mysuru Junction
- Krishnarajanagara
- Holenarasipura
- Hassan Junction
- Arsikere Junction
- Kadur Junction
- Chikjajur
- Davangere
- Kotturu
- Tungabhadra Dam
- Koppal
- Gadag Junction
- Hubballi Junction
- Dharwad
- Londa Junction
- Belagavi
- Ghataprabha
- Miraj Junction
- Sangli
- Karad
- Satara
- Lonand
- Pune Junction
- Lonavala
- Kalyan Junction
- Vasai Road
- Surat
- Vadodara Junction
- Ratlam Junction
- Mandsaur
- Nimach
- Chittaurgarh Junction
- Bhilwara
- Bijainagar
- Nasirabad
- Ajmer Junction

== Coach composition ==
The train has coaches 16 are :

1. General Unreserved - 4
2. Sleeper Class - 7
3. AC 3rd Class - 2
4. AC 2nd Class - 2
5. AC 1st Class - 1

== Traction ==
As the entire route is fully electrified, it is hauled by a Arakkonam Loco Shed-based WAP-7 electric locomotive from Mysuru Junction to Ajmer Junction and vice versa.

== Rake reversal or rake share ==
No rake reversal or rake share.

== See also ==
Trains from Mysuru Junction :

1. Basava Express
2. Mysuru–Varanasi Express
3. Mysuru–Thiruvananthapuram North Express
4. Chennai Central–Mysore Shatabdi Express
5. Mysuru–Cuddalore Port Express

Trains from Ajmer Junction :

1. Ajmer–Chandigarh Vande Bharat Express
2. Ajmer–Delhi Sarai Rohilla Jan Shatabdi Express
3. Ziyarat Express
4. Kishanganj–Ajmer Garib Nawaz Express
5. Ajmer–Bandra Terminus Express

== Notes ==
a. Runs a day in a week with both directions.
