= Fatehnagar railway station =

Railway station in Rajasthan, India

Fatehnagar

General information
- Location: Fatehnagar, Udaipur district, Rajasthan; India
- Coordinates: 24.818078°N 74.096228°E
- Elevation: 494 metres (1,621 ft)
- System: Indian Railways station
- Owner: Indian Railways
- Operator: North Western Railway
- Lines: Ajmer–Ratlam section Chittaurgarh–Udaipur section Kota–Chittaurgarh line
- Platforms: 2
- Tracks: 2

Construction
- Structure type: Standard (on-ground station)
- Parking: Yes
- Cycle facilities: No

Other information
- Status: Functioning
- Station code: FAN
- Zone(s): North Western Railway
- Division(s): Ajmer
Location
- Location within India Location within Rajasthan

Fatehnagar railway station is a railway station in Udaipur district, Rajasthan, India. Its code is FAN. It serves Fatehnagar town. The station consists of a pair of platforms. Passenger, Express, and Superfast trains halt here.

== Trains ==
The following trains halt at Fatehnagar railway station in both directions:

- Bandra Terminus–Udaipur Express
- Veer Bhumi Chittaurgarh Express
- Ratlam–Udaipur City Express
- Udaipur City–Jaipur Intercity Express
- Udaipur City–Haridwar Express
