= Jodhpur–Indore Express =

Train in India

Jodhpur-Indore Express

Overview
- Service type: Express
- First service: 4 April 2017; 9 years ago
- Current operator: North Western Railway

Route
- Termini: Jodhpur (JU); Indore Junction (INDB)
- Stops: 32
- Distance travelled: 738 km (459 mi)
- Average journey time: 14 hrs 45 mins
- Service frequency: Daily
- Train number: 14801 / 14802

On-board services
- Classes: Second Class Seating, AC Chair Car, AC 3 Tier, Sleeper Class, General Unreserved
- Seating arrangements: Yes
- Sleeping arrangements: Yes
- Catering facilities: On-board catering
- Observation facilities: Large windows
- Baggage facilities: Available
- Other facilities: Below the seats

Technical
- Rolling stock: LHB coach
- Track gauge: 1,676 mm (5 ft 6 in)
- Operating speed: 50 km/h (31 mph) average including halts.

The 14801 / 14802 Jodhpur-Indore Express is an express train service which runs between Jodhpur of Rajasthan and Indore Junction of Madhya Pradesh. It is currently being operated with 14801/14802 train numbers on a daily basis.

== Coach composition ==
The train consists of 20 LHB coaches;

- 1 AC Chair Car
- 3 AC III Tier
- 2 Sleeper Coaches
- 3 2nd Seating
- 9 General Unreserved
- 2 End On Generator cum SLR.

== Service ==
The 14801/Jodhpur - Indore Express has an average speed of 47 km/h and covers 740 km in 15 hrs 40 mins.

The 14802/Indore - Jodhpur Express has an average speed of 49 km/h and covers 740 km in 15 hrs 05 mins.

== Route and halts ==
The important halts of the train are;

- Jodhpur Junction
- Bhagat Ki Kothi
- Luni Junction
- Pali Marwar
- Marwar Junction
- Ajmer Junction
- Bhilwara
- Chittaurgarh Junction
- Neemuch
- Mandsaur
- Ratlam New
- Badnagar
- Fatehabad Chandrawatiganj Junction
- Laxmibai Nagar Junction
- Indore Junction

== Schedule ==
Train Number	Station Code	Departure Station	Departure Time	Departure Day	Arrival Station	Arrival Time	Arrival Day
14801	JU	Jodhpur Junction	07:20 AM	Daily	Indore Junction	23:00 PM	Daily
14802	INDB	Indore Junction	04:30 AM	Daily	Jodhpur Junction	19:35 PM	Daily

== Rake sharing ==
The train shares its rake with 12465/12466 Ranthambore Express.

== Direction reversals ==
Train reverses its direction twice at:

- Marwar Junction
- Ajmer Junction.

== Traction ==
Both trains are hauled by a Bhagat Ki Kothi Loco Shed based WAP-7 electric locomotive from Indore Junction to Jodhpur Junction and vice versa.

== See also ==
- Ranthambore Express
- Indore–Jaipur Express
- Indore–Ajmer Express
- Veer Bhumi Chittaurgarh Express
- Bhopal–Jodhpur Express
- Dayodaya Express
