= Kishangarh railway station =

Railway Station in Rajasthan, India

Kishangarh
- Indian Railway logo

General information
- Location: Kishangarh, Ajmer district, Rajasthan; India
- Coordinates: 26.589565°N 74.856359°E
- Elevation: 457 metres (1,499 ft)
- System: Indian Railways station
- Owner: Indian Railways
- Operator: North Western Railways
- Lines: Ahmedabad–Delhi main line Jaipur–Ahmedabad line
- Platforms: 2
- Tracks: 4

Construction
- Structure type: Standard (on ground station)
- Parking: Yes
- Cycle facilities: Yes
- Accessible: Available

Other information
- Status: Functional
- Station code: KSG
- Zone(s): North Western Railway zone
- Division(s): Jaipur
Location
- Location within Rajasthan Location within India

Kishangarh railway station is a railway station in Ajmer district, Rajasthan. Its code is KSG. It serves Kishangarh city. The station consists of two platforms. Passenger, Express and Superfast trains halt here.

== Trains ==
The following trains halt at Kishangarh railway station in both directions:

- Khajuraho–Udaipur City Express
- Udaipur City–Delhi Sarai Rohilla Chetak Superfast Express
- Ajmer–Sealdah Express
- Rajkot–Delhi Sarai Rohilla Weekly Express
- Bhavnagar Terminus–Delhi Sarai Rohilla Link Express
- Jaipur–Hyderabad Weekly Express
- Ahmedabad–Haridwar Yoga Express
- Ajmer–Delhi Sarai Rohilla Jan Shatabdi Express
- Ala Hazrat Express (via Bhildi)
- Ala Hazrat Express (via Ahmedabad)
- Bhopal–Jaipur Express
- Ajmer–Chandigarh Garib Rath Express
- Ajmer–Ernakulam Marusagar Superfast Express
- Udaipur City–Haridwar Express
- Ajmer–Amritsar Express (via Firozpur)
- Ajmer–Amritsar Express (via Dhuri)
- Bandra Terminus–Jaipur Amrapur Aravali Express
- Agra Fort–Ajmer Intercity Express
- Ajmer–Jammu Tawi Pooja Superfast Express
- Porbandar–Delhi Sarai Rohilla Express
- Udaipur City–Jaipur Intercity Express
- New Delhi–Daurai Shatabdi Express
- Nagpur–Jaipur Weekly Express
- Jaisalmer–Kathgodam Ranikhet Express
- Ajmer–Jabalpur Dayodaya Superfast Express
- Okha–Jaipur Weekly Express
- Durg–Ajmer Express
