= Nimbahera railway station =

Railway station in Rajasthan, India

Nimbahera

General information
- Location: NH-79, Nimbahera, Chittaurgarh district, Rajasthan; India
- Coordinates: 24.624492°N 74.694507°E
- Elevation: 441 metres (1,447 ft)
- System: Indian Railways station
- Owner: Indian Railways
- Operator: Western Railway
- Lines: Ajmer–Ratlam section, Chittaurgarh–Udaipur section, Kota–Chittaurgarh line
- Platforms: 3
- Tracks: 4

Construction
- Structure type: Standard (on-ground station)
- Parking: Yes
- Cycle facilities: No

Other information
- Status: Functional
- Station code: NBH
- Zone(s): Western Railway
- Division(s): Ratlam
Location
- Location within Rajasthan Location within India

Nimbahera railway station is a railway station in Chittaurgarh district, Rajasthan. Its code is NBH. It serves Nimbahera town. The station consists of a single platform. Passenger, Express, and Superfast trains halt here.

== Trains ==
The following trains halt at Nimbahera railway station in both directions:

- Bandra Terminus–Udaipur Express
- Bhopal–Jaipur Express
- Veer Bhumi Chittaurgarh Express
- Ratlam–Udaipur City Express
- Jodhpur–Indore Express
