= Kapasan railway station =

Railway station in Rajasthan, India

Kapasan
- Indian Railways logo

General information
- Location: SH-9, Kapasan, Chittorgarh district, Rajasthan; India
- Coordinates: 24.861320°N 74.310973°E
- System: Indian Railways station
- Owner: Indian Railways
- Operator: North Western Railways
- Line: Chittorgarh–Udaipur line
- Platforms: 1
- Tracks: 2

Construction
- Structure type: Standard (on ground station)
- Parking: Yes
- Accessible: Available

Other information
- Status: Functioning
- Station code: KIN
- Zone(s): North Western Railway zone
- Division(s): Ajmer
Location
- Location within Rajasthan Location within India

Kapasan railway station is a railway station in Chittorgarh district, Rajasthan. Its code is KIN. It serves Kapasan city. The station consists of a single platform. Passenger, Express and Superfast trains halt here.

== Trains ==
The following trains halt at Kapasan in both directions:

- Udaipur City–New Jalpaiguri Weekly Express
- Ratlam–Udaipur City Express
- Veer Bhumi Chittaurgarh Express
- Udaipur City–Jaipur Intercity Express
- Udaipur City–Haridwar Express
- Mewar Express
- Chetak Express
