= Rana Pratap Nagar railway station =

Railway station in Rajasthan, India

Rana Pratap Nagar

General information
- Location: Maa Ji ki Sarai, Thokar Chauraha, Udaipur, Rajasthan; India
- Coordinates: 24.5828414°N 73.7289164°E
- Elevation: 563.00 metres (1,847.11 ft)
- System: Indian Railways station
- Owner: Indian Railways
- Operator: North Western Railways
- Platforms: 2
- Tracks: 3
- Connections: Taxi stand, Autorickshaw

Construction
- Structure type: Standard (on-ground station)
- Parking: Available

Other information
- Status: Functional
- Station code: RPZ
- Zone(s): North Western Railway zone
- Division(s): Ajmer
Location
- Location within Rajasthan Location within India

Rana Pratap Nagar railway station (station code: RPZ) is the second railway station in Udaipur, Rajasthan, India, besides the main Udaipur City railway station. The railway station is under the administrative control of North Western Railway of Indian Railways.

== Overview ==
Rana Pratap Nagar railway station has two platforms and has a single electrified BG track. It is situated in Khempura, near Thokar Chouraha, around 3 km from the city center, and around 18 km from Udaipur Airport. Its main purpose of building this station was to decongest the main Udaipur City railway station.

== Important trains ==
Train No.	Train name
19653/19654	Veer Bhumi Chittaurgarh Express
19327/19328	Ratlam–Udaipur City Express
19609/19610	Udaipur City–Haridwar Express
12963/12964	Mewar Express
12315/12316	Ananya Express
22901/22902	Bandra Terminus–Udaipur Superfast Express
12991/12992	Udaipur City–Jaipur Intercity Express
12982/12981	Chetak Express
19665/19666	Khajuraho–Udaipur City Express

== See also ==
- Udaipur
- Udaipur Airport
- Udaipur City Bus Depot
- Udaipur City railway station
