= Mandsaur–Meerut City Link Express =

Train in India

Mandsaur–Meerut City Link Express ,this train was cancelled from corona era ,local people of Meerut city raised the demand to restart it,it was used to run between Meerut city to kota to and fro.rake of this train attached and detached with dehradoon express 19020 =19019 now runs from Haridwar from corona period
Overview
- Service type: Express
- Current operator: Western Railway

Route
- Termini: Mandsaur (MDS); Meerut City (MTC)
- Stops: 35
- Distance travelled: 805 km (500 mi)
- Average journey time: 17 hrs 25 mins
- Service frequency: Daily (Note: Runs seven days in a week for every direction.)
- Train number: 29019 / 29020

On-board services
- Classes: AC 2 tier, AC 3 tier, Sleeper class, General Unreserved
- Seating arrangements: Yes
- Sleeping arrangements: Yes
- Catering facilities: On-board catering, E-catering
- Observation facilities: Large windows
- Baggage facilities: No
- Other facilities: Below the seats

Technical
- Rolling stock: ICF coach
- Track gauge: 1,676 mm (5 ft 6 in)
- Operating speed: 46 km/h (29 mph) average including halts.

The Mandsaur-Meerut City Link Express is an Express train belonging to Western Railway zone that runs between Mandsaur and Meerut City Junction in India. It is currently being operated with 29019/29020 train numbers on a daily basis.

== Service ==
The 29019/Mandsaur–Meerut City Link Express has an average speed of 46 km/h and covers 805 km in 17h 25m. The 29020/Meerut City–Mandsaur Link Express has an average speed of 43 km/h and covers 805 km in 18h 30m.

== Route and halts ==
The important halts of the train are:

- Mandsaur
- Nimach
- Chittaurgarh Junction
- Kota Junction
- Sawai Madhopur Junction
- Gangapur City
- Hindaun City
- Bayana Junction
- Bharatpur Junction
- Mathura Junction
- Tughlakabad
- Okhla
- Hazrat Nizamuddin
- Sahibabad Junction
- Ghaziabad Junction
- Muradnagar
- Modinagar
- Meerut City Junction

== Coach composition ==
The train has standard ICF rakes with a maximum speed of 110 km/h. The train consists of 6 coaches:

- 1 AC II Tier and AC III Tier
- 1 AC III Tier
- 2 Sleeper coaches
- 1 General Unreserved

== Traction ==
Both trains are hauled by a Ratlam Loco Shed-based WDM-3A diesel locomotive from Mandsaur to Kota. From Kota trains are hauled by a Ghaziabad Loco Shed or Tuglakabad Loco Shed-based WAP-4E electric locomotive until Meerut and vice versa.

== Rake sharing ==
The train attached to 19019/19020 Bandra Terminus–Dehradun Express at Kota and run together between Kota and Meerut.

== Direction reversal ==
The train reverses its direction 1 times:

- Kota Junction

== See also ==
- Mandsaur railway station
- Meerut City Junction railway station
- Bandra Terminus- Dehradun Express
