= Khajuraho–Udaipur City Express =

Train in India

Overview
- Service type: Express
- Locale: Madhya Pradesh, Uttar Pradesh & Rajasthan
- Current operator: North Western Railway

Route
- Termini: Khajuraho (KURJ); Udaipur City (UDZ)
- Stops: 31
- Distance travelled: 1,090 km (677 mi)
- Average journey time: 21 hrs 30 mins
- Service frequency: Daily (Note: Runs two days in a week for every direction.)
- Train number: 19665 / 19666

On-board services
- Classes: AC First Class, AC 2 Tier, AC 3 Tier, Sleeper Class, General Unreserved
- Seating arrangements: Yes
- Sleeping arrangements: Yes
- Catering facilities: On-board catering, E-catering
- Observation facilities: Large windows
- Baggage facilities: No
- Other facilities: Below the seats

Technical
- Rolling stock: LHB coach
- Track gauge: 1,676 mm (5 ft 6 in)
- Operating speed: 52 km/h (32 mph) average including halts.

The 19665 / 19666 Khajuraho–Udaipur City Express is an Express train belonging to North Western Railway zone that runs between Khajuraho and Udaipur City in India. It is currently being operated with 19665/19666 train numbers on a daily basis.

== Service ==
The 19665/Khajuraho–Udaipur City Express has an average speed of 52 km/h and covers 1090 km in 21h 10m . 19666/Udaipur City–Khajuraho Express has an average speed of 54 km/h and covers 1090 km in 20h 10m.

== Route and halts ==
The halts of the train are:

1. Khajuraho
2. Mahoba Junction
3. Kulpahar
4. Harpalpur
5. Mauranipur
6. Niwari
7. Jhansi Junction
8. Datia
9. Dabra
10. Gwalior Junction
11. Morena
12. Dholpur Junction
13. Agra Cantonment
14. Achhnera Junction
15. Bharatpur Junction
16. Nadbai
17. Kherli
18. Bandikui Junction
19. Dausa
20. Getor Jagatpura
21. Gandhinagar Jaipur
22. Jaipur Junction
23. Phulera Junction
24. Kishangarh
25. Ajmer Junction
26. Bhilwara
27. Chittaurgarh Junction
28. Mavli Junction
29. Rana Pratap Nagar
30. Udaipur City

== Coach composition ==
The train has standard LHB rakes with max speed of 160 kmph. The train consists of 21 coaches:

- 1 AC First-class
- 2 AC II Tier
- 6 AC III Tier
- 5 Sleeper coaches
- 2 AC III Economy
- 3 General
- 2 Generators cum Luggage/parcel van

== Traction ==
Both trains are hauled by a Jhansi Loco Shed-based WAP-4 electric locomotive from Khajuraho to Udaipur and vice versa.

== Direction reversals ==
The train reverses its direction twice:

- Mahoba Junction
- Chittaurgarh Junction

Previously it was used to reverses its direction at Idgah Agra but now it bypassing it.

== See also ==
- Udaipur City railway station
- Khajuraho railway station
- Veer Bhumi Chittaurgarh Express
