= Ajmer–Bandra Terminus Express =

Train in India

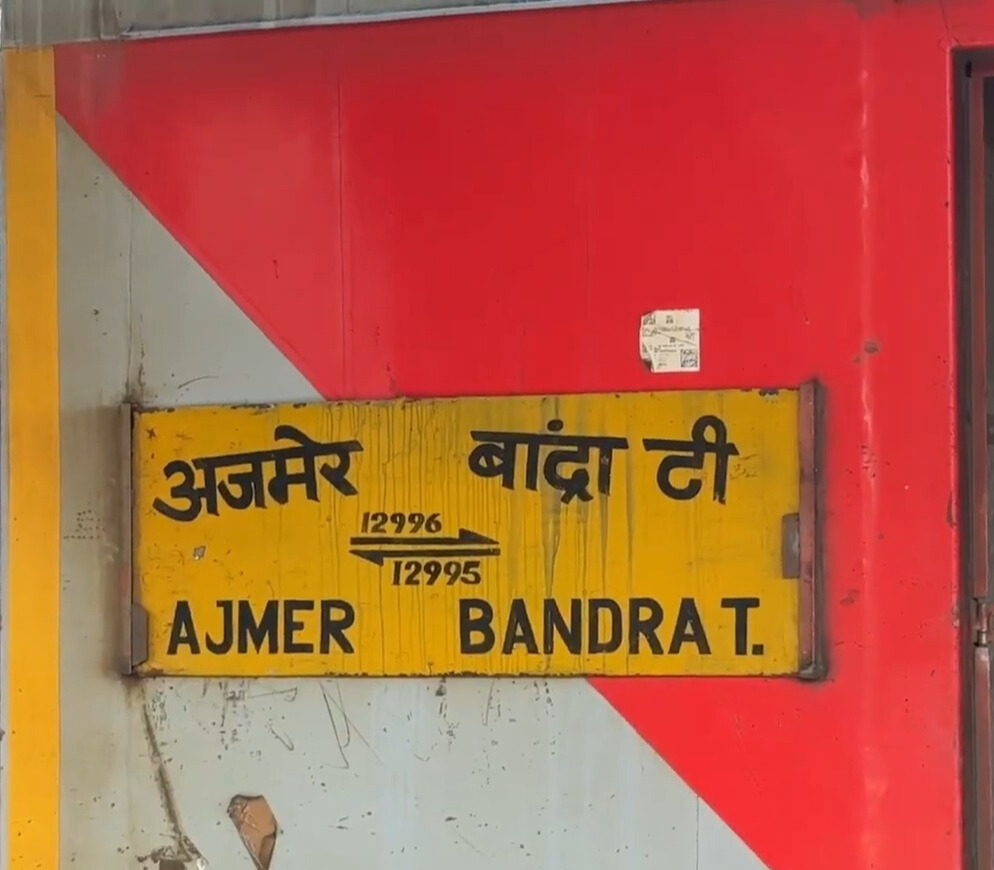

Overview
- Service type: Superfast Express
- Locale: Maharashtra, Gujarat, Madhya Pradesh & Rajasthan
- Current operator: North Western Railways

Route
- Termini: Ajmer Junction (AII); Bandra Terminus (BDTS)
- Stops: 17
- Distance travelled: 1,018 km (633 mi)
- Average journey time: 17 hours 50 minutes
- Service frequency: 3 days a week.
- Train number: 12995 / 12996

On-board services
- Class(es): AC 2 tier, AC 3 tier, AC 3 tier Economy, Sleeper class, General Unreserved
- Seating arrangements: Yes
- Sleeping arrangements: Yes
- Catering facilities: On-board catering, E-catering
- Observation facilities: Large windows
- Other facilities: Below the seats

Technical
- Rolling stock: LHB coach
- Track gauge: 1,676 mm (5 ft 6 in)
- Operating speed: 57 km/h (35 mph) average including halts

The 12995 / 12996 Ajmer–Bandra Terminus Express is a Superfast Express train belonging to Indian Railways – North Western Railway zone that runs between Ajmer Junction and Bandra Terminus in India.

It operates as train number 12996 from Ajmer Junction to Bandra Terminus and as train number 12995 in the reverse direction, serving the state of Rajasthan, Madhya Pradesh, Gujarat & Maharashtra.

== Coaches ==
The 12996 / 12995 Ajmer–Bandra Terminus Express presently has 1 AC 2 tier, 6 AC 3 tier, 4 AC 3 tier Economy, 5 Sleeper class, 4 General Unreserved and 1 EOG & 1 SLR(Seating cum Luggage Rake) coaches. It does not have a pantry car.

As is customary with most train services in India, coach composition may be amended at the discretion of Indian Railways depending on demand.

== Service ==
The 12996 Ajmer–Bandra TerminusExpress covers the distance of 1017 kilometres in 18 hours 00 mins (56.50 km/h) and in 17 hours 50 mins as 12995 Bandra Terminus–Ajmer Express (57.03 km/h).

As the average speed of the train is above 55 km/h, as per Indian Railways rules, its fare includes a Superfast surcharge.

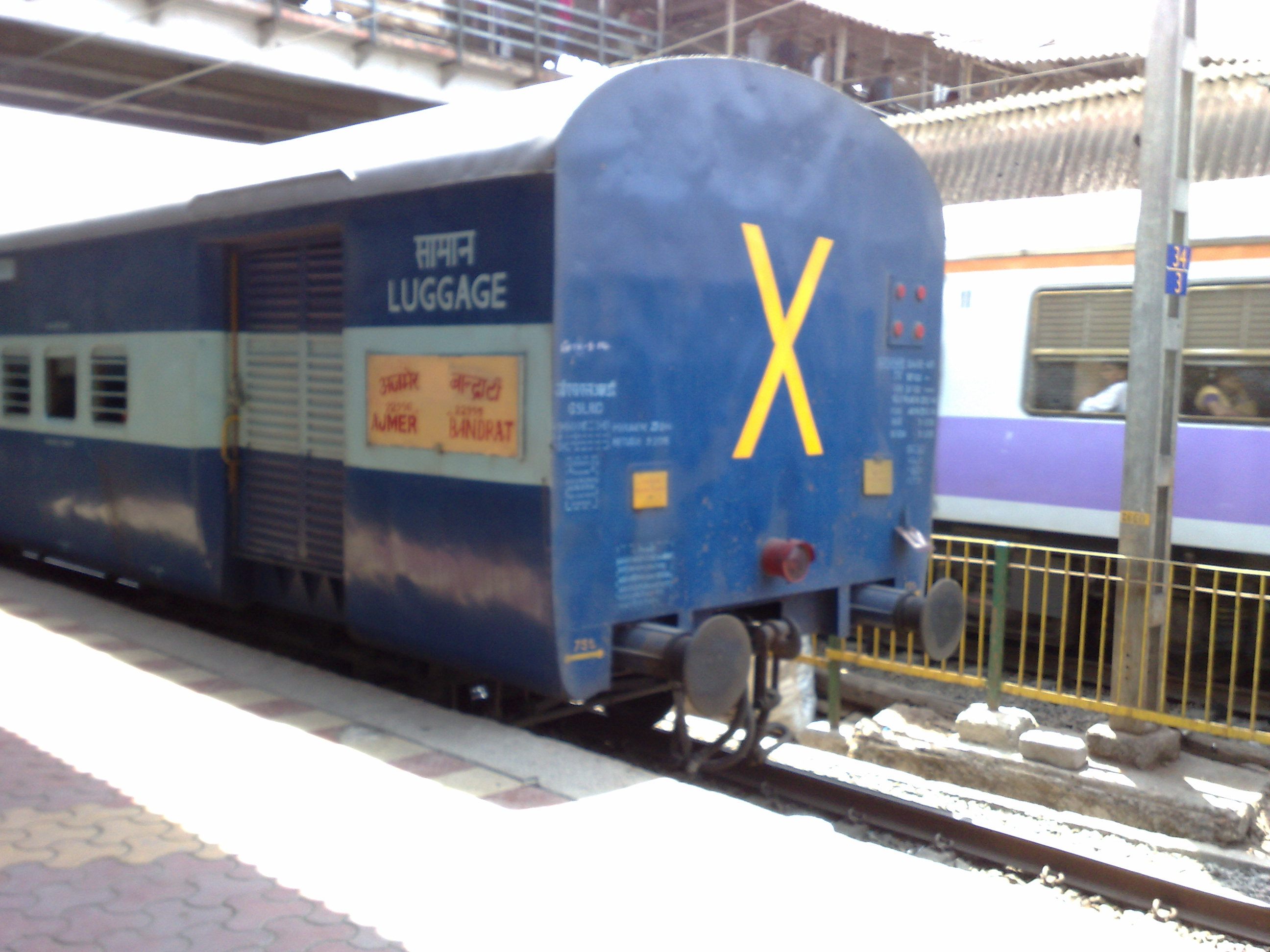
Ajmer–Bandra Terminus Express coach

== Routeing ==
The 12995/12996 Ajmer–Bandra Terminus Express runs from Ajmer Junction via Bhilwara, Chittaurgarh Junction, Neemuch, Mandsaur, Ratlam Junction, Dahod, Godhra Junction, Vadodara Junction, Bharuch Junction, Surat, Valsad, Vapi, Borivali to Bandra Terminus.

== Traction ==
As the route is now fully electrified, it is hauled by a Vadodara Loco Shed-based WAP-7 electric locomotive on its entire journey.

== Timings ==
- 12996 Ajmer–Bandra TerminusExpress leaves Ajmer Junction every Tuesday, Thursday & Saturday at 20:30 hrs IST and reaches Bandra Terminus at 14:20 hrs IST the next day.
- 12995 Bandra Terminus–Ajmer Express leaves Bandra Terminus every Wednesday, Friday & Sunday at 15:45 hrs IST and reaches Ajmer Junction at 09:45 hrs IST the next day.
