= Naraina railway station =

Railway station in Rajasthan, India

General information
- Location: Jaipur district, Rajasthan; India
- Coordinates: 26.7961°N 75.1923°E
- Elevation: 377 metres (1,237 ft)
- System: Indian Railways station
- Owner: Indian Railways
- Operator: North Western Railway
- Platforms: 2
- Tracks: 4 (Double Diesel BG)
- Connections: Auto stand

Construction
- Structure type: Standard (on-ground station)
- Parking: No
- Cycle facilities: No

Other information
- Status: Functioning
- Station code: NRI
- Zone(s): North Western Railway
- Division(s): Jaipur
Location

Naraina railway station is a small railway station in Jaipur district, Rajasthan. Its code is NRI. It serves Naraina village. The station consists of two platforms. The platforms are not well sheltered. It lacks many facilities including water and sanitation.

== Major trains ==
The following trains run from Naraina railway station:

- Ahmedabad–Jaipur Passenger
- Ala Hazrat Express
- Amrapur Aravali Express
- Bhopal–Jaipur Express
- Udaipur City–Haridwar Express
- Indore–Jaipur Express via Ajmer
