= Mewar Express =

Train in India

Mewar SF Express
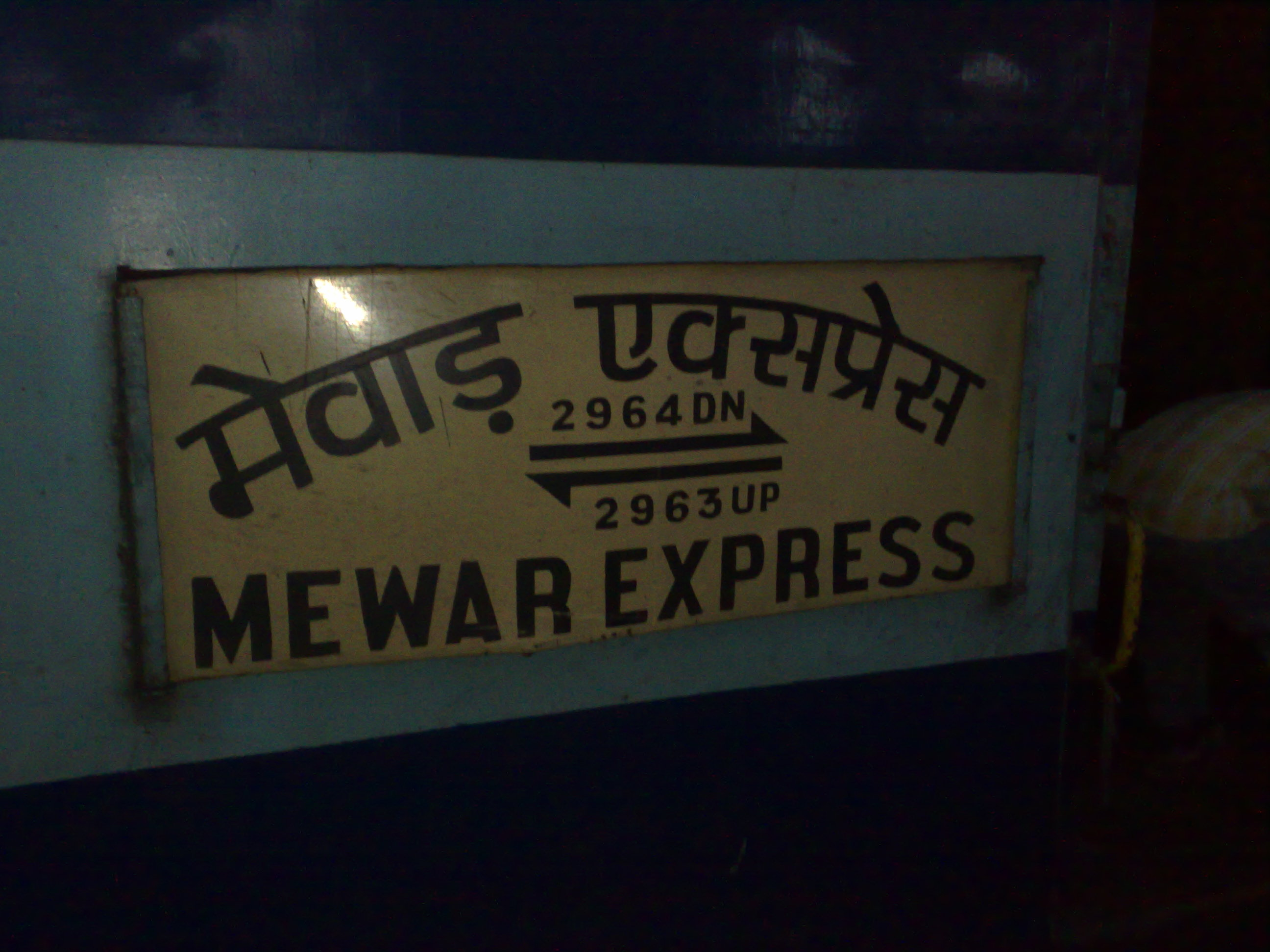
- Mewar Sf Express train board

Overview
- Service type: Superfast
- First service: 27 August 2005; 20 years ago
- Current operator: North Western Railway

Route
- Termini: Udaipur City (UDZ); Hazrat Nizamuddin (NZM)
- Stops: 18
- Distance travelled: 743 km (462 mi)
- Average journey time: 12 hours 20 minutes
- Service frequency: Daily
- Train number: 12963 / 12964

On-board services
- Classes: AC First Class, AC 2 Tier, AC 3 Tier, AC 3 Tier Economy, Sleeper Class, General Unreserved
- Seating arrangements: Yes
- Sleeping arrangements: Yes
- Catering facilities: On-board catering E-catering
- Observation facilities: Large windows
- Baggage facilities: Available
- Other facilities: Below the seats

Technical
- Rolling stock: LHB coach
- Track gauge: 1,676 mm (5 ft 6 in)
- Operating speed: 58 km/h (36 mph) average including halts.

The 12963 / 12964 Mewar Express is a superfast express train runs from Hazrat Nizamuddin, New Delhi to Udaipur City. It traverses the 743 kilometres (462 mi) journey in 12 hours 49 minutes, with 16 halts in between. The erstwhile kingdom in southern Rajasthan encompassing Udaipur was called Mewar.

Another 12965/12966 Mewar Express was introduced to run between Udaipur City and Jaipur Junction VIA Chittaurgarh jn. It ran till 27/09/2008 & was extended to Gwalior & later extended further to Khajuraho in 2009 & the route was changed via Ajmer Junction, Jaipur Junction, Bharatpur Junction, Agra Cantonment,Gwalior & Jhansi Junction, downgraded to Express, renumbered as 19665/19666 & renamed as Khajuraho–Udaipur City Express.

== Service ==
The 12963 Mewar Express covers the distance of 744 kilometres (462 mi) in 12 hours 20 mins at speed of 60 kilometres per hour (37 mph) & in 12 hours 20 mins as 12964 Mewar Express at speed of 60 kilometres per hour (37 mph) & is classified as an Express train. Timings are:- Hazrat Nizamuddin departure 19.00 hrs, reversing at Kota Junction departure 02.05 hrs & arriving Udaipur City at 07.20 hrs as 12963 Mewar Express. Udaipur City departure 18.15 hrs, Hazrat Nizamuddin arrival 06.35 hrs as 12964 Mewar Express. As the average speed of the train is above at speed of 55 kilometres per hour (34 mph), as per Indian Railways rules, its fare includes a superfast surcharge.

Another 12965/12966 Mewar Express was introduced to run between Udaipur City & Jaipur Junction. Timings were:- Jaipur Junction departure 21.40 hrs; reversing at Sawai Madhopur departure 00.10 hrs, reversing at Kota Junction departure 01.55 hrs & reversing at Chittaurgarh Junction departure 05.05 hrs, arriving Udaipur City at 07.00 hrs as 12965 Mewar Express. In return, Udaipur City departure 20.30 hrs, arriving Jaipur Junction at 05.50 hrs as 12966 Mewar Express. This train used to cover 527 kilometres (327 mi) in 9 hours 20 mins at speed of 56 kilometres per hour (35 mph) & was a Superfast Express train. It ran till 27/09/2008 & was extended to Gwalior & later extended further to Khajuraho in 2009. The route was changed via Ajmer Junction, Jaipur Junction, Bharatpur Junction, Agra Cantonment, Gwalior & Jhansi Junction, downgraded to Express, renumbered as 19665/19666 & renamed as Khajuraho Express.

== Route & Halts ==
The 12963/12964 Mewar Express runs from Udaipur City via Mavli Junction, Kapasan, Chittaurgarh Junction, Chanderiya, Mandalgarh,Bundi, Kota Junction, Sawai Madhopur, Gangapur City, Shri Mahabirji, Hindaun City, Bayana Junction, Bharatpur Junction, Mathura Junction to Hazrat Nizamuddin.

The 12965/12966 Mewar Express used to run from Udaipur City via Mavli Junction, Kapasan, Chittaurgarh Junction, Chanderiya, Mandalgarh, Bundi, Kota Junction, Sawai Madhopur to Jaipur Junction. The service was withdrawn from 27/09/2008.

== Traction ==
The 12963/12964 Mewar Express is hauled by Tughlakabad Loco Shed or Vadodara Loco Shed-based WAP-7 electric locomotive from Udaipur City to Hazrat Nizamuddin and vice versa.

The 12965/12966 Mewar Express was hauled by a Bhagat Ki Kothi Loco Shed-based WDP-4 / WDP-4B / WDP-4D diesel locomotive in its entire journey, until the service was withdrawn on 27/09/2008.

== Accident ==
On 21 October 2009, a Mewar Express train was stopped at red light signal in Mathura when a Goa Express train hit it from behind. There were 25 deaths.
