= Mavli Junction railway station =

Railway Station in Rajasthan, India

Mavli Junction
- Indian Railways logo

General information
- Location: Mavli, Udaipur district, Rajasthan; India
- Coordinates: 24.794255°N 73.973891°E
- Elevation: 500 metres (1,600 ft)
- System: Indian Railways station
- Owner: Indian Railways
- Operator: North Western Railways
- Lines: Ajmer–Ratlam section, Chittaurgarh–Udaipur section, Kota–Chittaurgarh line, Mavli Jn- Marwar Jn (MG) under gauge conversion now, Mavli - Barisadri line.
- Platforms: 5
- Tracks: 5

Construction
- Structure type: Standard (on-ground station)
- Parking: Yes
- Cycle facilities: No
- Accessible: Available

Other information
- Status: Functioning
- Station code: MVJ
- Zone(s): North Western Railway zone
- Division(s): Ajmer
Location
- Location within Rajasthan Location within India

Mavli Junction railway station is a railway station in Udaipur district, Rajasthan. Its code is MVJ. It serves Mavli city. The station consists of five platforms. Passenger Express and Superfast trains halt here.

== Trains ==
The following trains halt at Mavli Junction railway station in both directions:

- Bandra Terminus–Udaipur Express
- Veer Bhumi Chittaurgarh Express (Asarwa- INDB)
- Ratlam–Udaipur City Express
- Udaipur City–Jaipur Intercity Express
- Udaipur City–Haridwar Express
- Udaipur City–Delhi Sarai Rohilla Rajasthan Humsafar Express
- Ananya Express
- Udaipur City–New Jalpaiguri Weekly Express
- Udaipur City–Kamakhya Kavi Guru Express
- Okha–Nathdwara Express
- Khajuraho–Udaipur City Express
- Mewar Express
- Udaipur City–Patliputra Humsafar Express
- Chetak Express
- Shalimar–Udaipur City Weekly Express
- Asarva- Jaipur Superfast
- Asarva- Kota bi-weekly train
- Asarva- Chittaurgarh DEMU
- Mavli Jn-Marwar Jn a pair of passenger trains (The service is withdrawn due to ensuing gauge conversion)
- Udaipur City Madar Exp
- Bari Sadri (BI)- UDZ passenger
