= Berchha railway station =

Railway station in Madhya Pradesh

Berchha

General information
- Location: Berchha, Shajapur district, Madhya Pradesh; India
- Coordinates: 23°17′01″N 76°20′07″E
- Elevation: 490 metres (1,610 ft)
- System: Indian Railways station
- Owner: Indian Railways
- Operator: Western Railway
- Line: Ujjain–Sehore–Bhopal section
- Platforms: 2
- Tracks: 2

Construction
- Structure type: Standard (on ground)
- Parking: Yes

Other information
- Status: Functioning
- Station code: BCH
- Zone(s): Western Railway
- Division(s): Ratlam
Location
- Location within India Location within Madhya Pradesh

Berchha railway station is a railway station in Shajapur district of Madhya Pradesh. Its code is BCH. It serves Berchha village. The station consists of two platforms. It lacks many facilities including water and sanitation. Passenger, Express and Superfast trains halt here.
