= Nmh =

NMH can refer to:

- National Maternity Hospital, Dublin, Ireland
- Northwestern Memorial Hospital, Chicago, Illinois, US, an academic medical center
- Northfield Mount Hermon School, Gill, Massachusetts, US, a co-ed college preparatory school
- National Museum of History, Taipei, Taiwan
- Norwegian Academy of Music, Oslo, Norway (Norges musikkhøgskole), a university-level music conservatory
- Neutral Milk Hotel (originated in the late 1980s), an American rock band
- Nejmeh SC (founded 1945), a Lebanese association football club (soccer team)
- No More Heroes, a 2007 video game for the Nintendo Wii
- nmh ("new MH"), a descendant of the MH Message Handling System e-mail client
- New Medium Helicopter (2021–2026), a British military aircraft procurement programme
- Neemuch railway station, Madhya Pradesh, India

== See also ==
- Nickel–metal hydride battery (NiMH)
