= Neemuch railway station =

Railway station in Madhya Pradesh

Neemuch
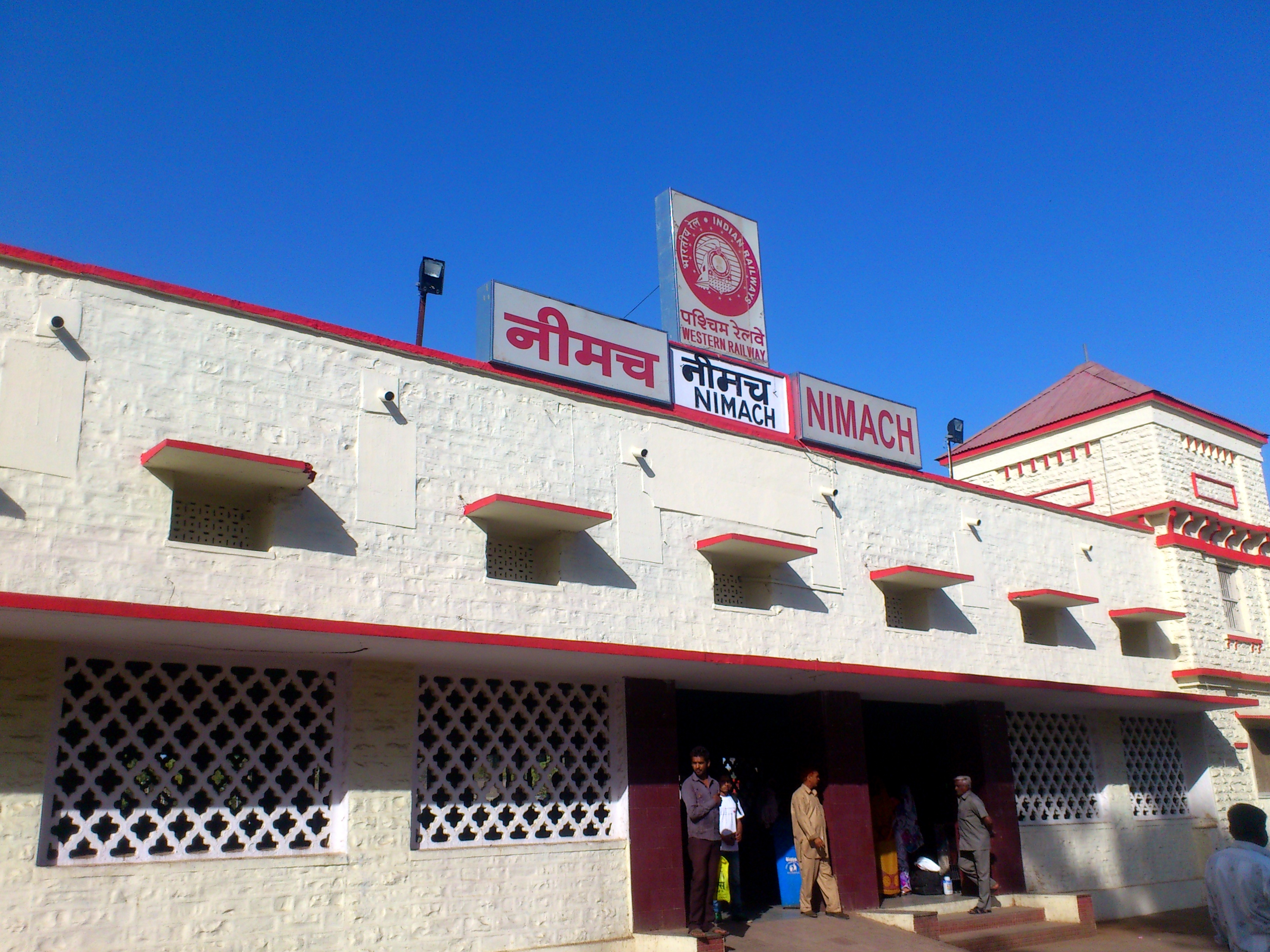

General information
- Location: Neemuch, Madhya Pradesh; India
- Coordinates: 24.462112°N 74.849849°E
- Elevation: 503 m (1,650 ft)
- System: Indian Railway Station
- Owner: Indian Railways
- Operator: Western Railway
- Line: Ajmer–Ratlam section
- Platforms: 1-1A, 2, 3
- Tracks: 7
- Connections: Taxi Stand, Auto Stand

Construction
- Structure type: Standard (on ground station)
- Parking: Available
- Cycle facilities: Available
- Accessible: Disabled access

Other information
- Status: Active
- Station code: NMH
- Zone(s): Western Railway
- Division(s): Ratlam

History
- Opened: 1879
Location
- Location within Madhya Pradesh Location within India

Neemuch railway station is a main railway station of Neemuch city, Madhya Pradesh. Its code is NMH. Neemuch is NSG 4 – category railway station of Western Railway Zone on the Ajmer – Ratlam section. The station consists of three platforms. Neemuch is well connected to Ratlam, Ujjain via Nagda and Kota, Bundi via Chittorgarh.

== Major Train ==
- Ajmer–Hyderabad Meenakshi Express
- Nagpur–Jaipur Weekly Express
- Indore–Jaipur Express via Ajmer
- Hisar–Hyderabad Weekly Express
- Veer Bhumi Chittaurgarh Express
- Indore–Ajmer Link Express
- Bhopal–Jaipur Express
