= Indore–Ajmer Link Express =

Train in India

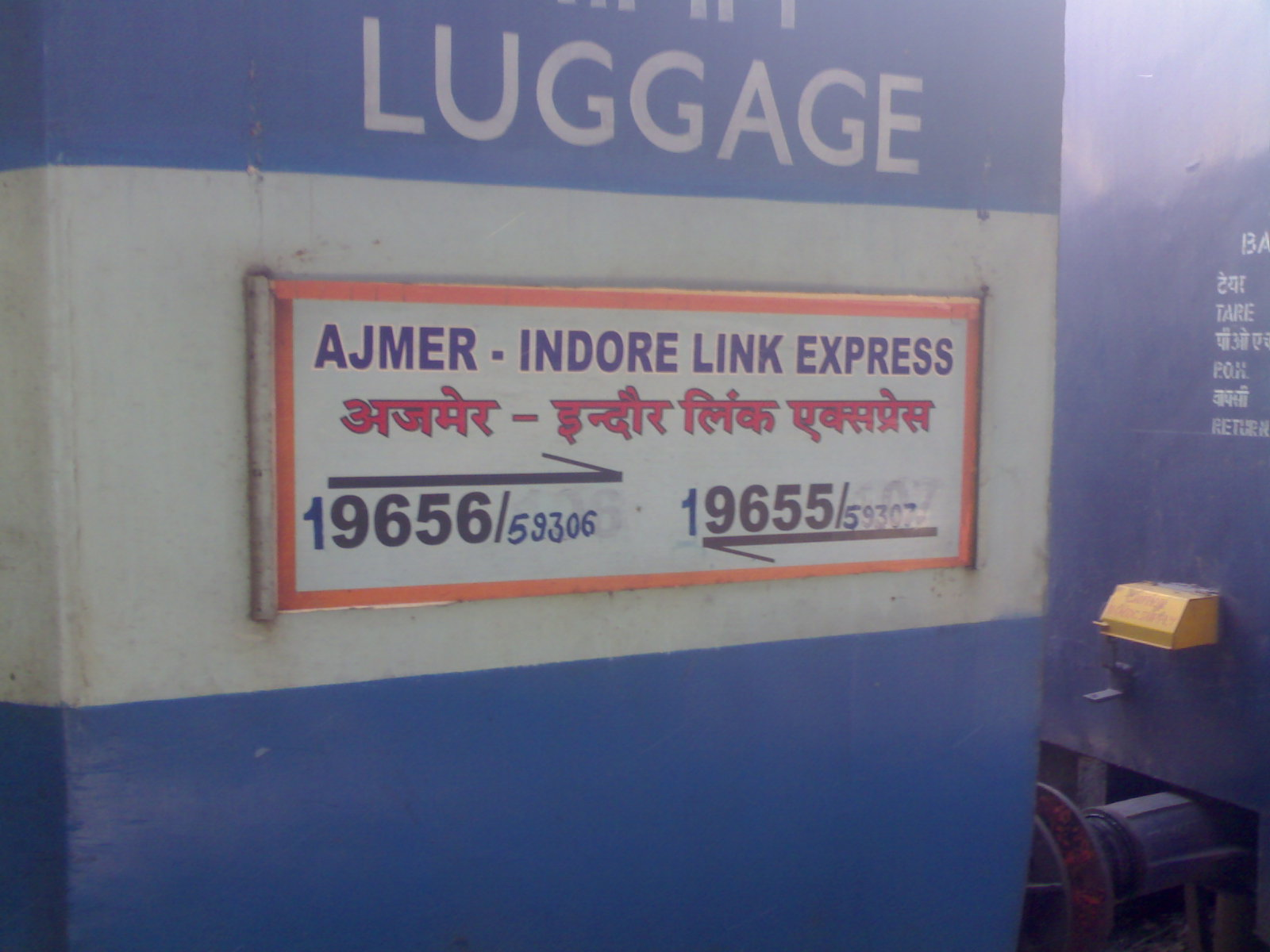
Indore–Ajmer Link Express logo

The Indore - Ajmer Link Express was a daily link express train which runs between Indore Junction railway station of Indore, the largest city and commercial hub of Madhya Pradesh and Ajmer, a pilgrimage spot in Rajasthan

The train has been extended to Jaipur and now it runs as the Indore - Ajmer - Jaipur Express

== Arrival and departure ==
- Train number 9655A was departing from Indore Junction daily at 18:00 hrs., and was reaching Ajmer, the next day at 06:30 hrs.
- Train number 9656A used to depart from Ajmer daily at 2125 hrs., reaching Indore Junction, the next day at 09:00 hrs.

== Route and halts ==
The train used to go via. Ujjain Junction - Ratlam Junction and Neemuch. The important halts of the train were :

- INDORE JUNCTION
- Dewas
- Ujjain Junction
- Khachrod
- Nagda Junction
- Ratlam Junction
- Mandsaur
- Nimach
- Chittorgarh Junction
- Bhilwara
- Nasirabad
- AJMER JUNCTION

== Coach composite ==
As the train was a link service therefore the coach were attached at back of 59307/59308 Indore - Ujjain Passenger and then from Ujjain, it were attached to the halted 19655/19656 Bhopal - Ajmer Express. The train consist a total number of 17 Coaches :

- 1 AC II
- 1 AC III
- 3 SLEEPER
- 4 GENERAL

Link service : A total of 7 additional coaches were attached to the train from Ujjain out of which:

- 1 AC II
- 4 SLEEPER
- 2 GENERAL COACH

== Average speed and frequency ==
The train used to run on daily from both the sites with an average speed of 66 km/hour

== History ==
This train was introduced in year 2009 and is the only direct connection from Bhopal/Indore to Ajmer. This train replaced by the Old 9303/9304 Bhopal - Ratlam Intercity Express. This train has also replaced the old 9657/9658 Ratlam - Ajmer Night Express.
