= Indore–Jaipur Express via Ajmer =

Train in India

The Indore–Jaipur Express via. Ajmer is a daily express train which runs between Indore Junction railway station of Indore, the largest and commercial capital city of Madhya Pradesh and Jaipur, the capital city of Rajasthan. It previously ran as the Indore–Ajmer Express from Bhopal to Ajmer, a pilgrimage spot in Rajasthan, and prior to that as the Indore–Ratlam Intercity Express.

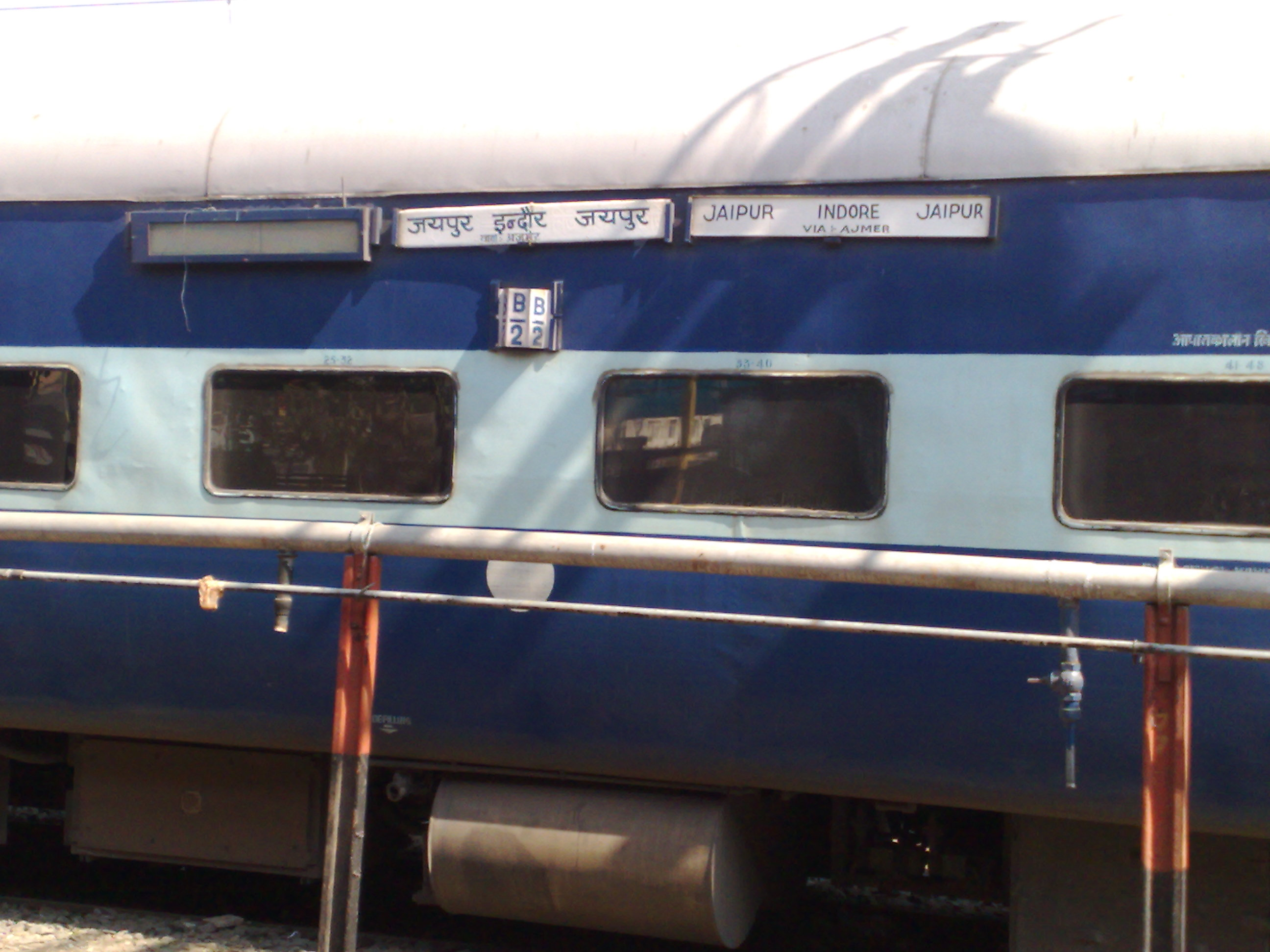
Indore Jaipur Express

== Number and nomenclature ==
The number for the train are :

- 19711: Indore to Jaipur
- 19712: Jaipur to Indore

The train was also known as Ajmeri Link Express which signifies the nearby destination of the train that is Ajmer

== Arrival and departure ==
Train number 19711 departs from Indore Junction daily at 1800 hrs., reaching Jaipur, the next day at 0930 hrs.

Train number 19712 departs from Jaipur daily at 17:25 hrs., reaching Indore Junction, the next day at 10:25 hrs.

== Route and stops ==
The train goes via Ujjain Junction – Ratlam Junction and Neemuch. The important stops of the train are:

- INDORE JUNCTION
- Indore Sanwer
- Indore Lakshmibai Nagar
- Dewas
- Ujjain Junction
- Khachrod
- Nagda Junction
- Ratlam Junction
- Mandsaur
- Nimach
- Chittorgarh Junction
- Bhilwara
- Nasirabad
- Ajmer Junction
- Kishangarh
- Phulera
- JAIPUR

== Coach composite ==
The train consist a total number of 10 coaches:

- 1 AC II
- 2 AC III
- 5 sleeper
- 2 general

== Average speed and frequency ==
The train used to run daily from both the sites with an average speed of 66 kilometres per hour (41 mph).

== Other trains from Indore/ Ujjain to Ajmer ==
- Kolkata–Ajmer Express
- Hyderabad–Ajmer Express
- Pune–Jaipur Express

== Bhopal–Ratlam Intercity Express ==
The Bhopal–Ratlam Intercity Express was a daily Intercity Express which ran between Bhopal Junction railway station of Bhopal, the capital city of Madhya Pradesh and Ratlam Junction railway station of Ratlam in Western Madhya Pradesh. The train was numbered 9303/9304. The main halts of the train were Bhopal Bairagarh, Shujalpur, Ujjain and Berchha. It used to run on daily basis with average speed of 62 km/h (39 mph).

In 2009 it was replaced by 9655/9656 Bhopal–Ajmer Express, which was extended in 2011 to Jaipur as the Bhopal–Jaipur Express.
