= Nagpur–Jaipur Weekly Express =

Train in India

Jaipur–Nagpur Weekly Express

Overview
- Service type: Express
- First service: 26 September 2013; 12 years ago
- Current operator: Central Railway

Route
- Termini: Nagpur (NGP); Jaipur Junction (JP)
- Stops: 12
- Distance travelled: 1,346 km (836 mi)
- Average journey time: 26 hours 10 minutes
- Service frequency: Weekly (Note: Runs one days in a week for every direction.)
- Train number: 11203 / 11204

On-board services
- Classes: AC 2 tier, AC 3 tier, Sleeper class, General Unreserved
- Seating arrangements: Yes
- Sleeping arrangements: Yes
- Catering facilities: On-board catering
- Observation facilities: Below the seats
- Baggage facilities: Available

Technical
- Rolling stock: ICF coach
- Track gauge: 1,676 mm (5 ft 6 in)
- Operating speed: 51 km/h (32 mph) average including halts
Route map
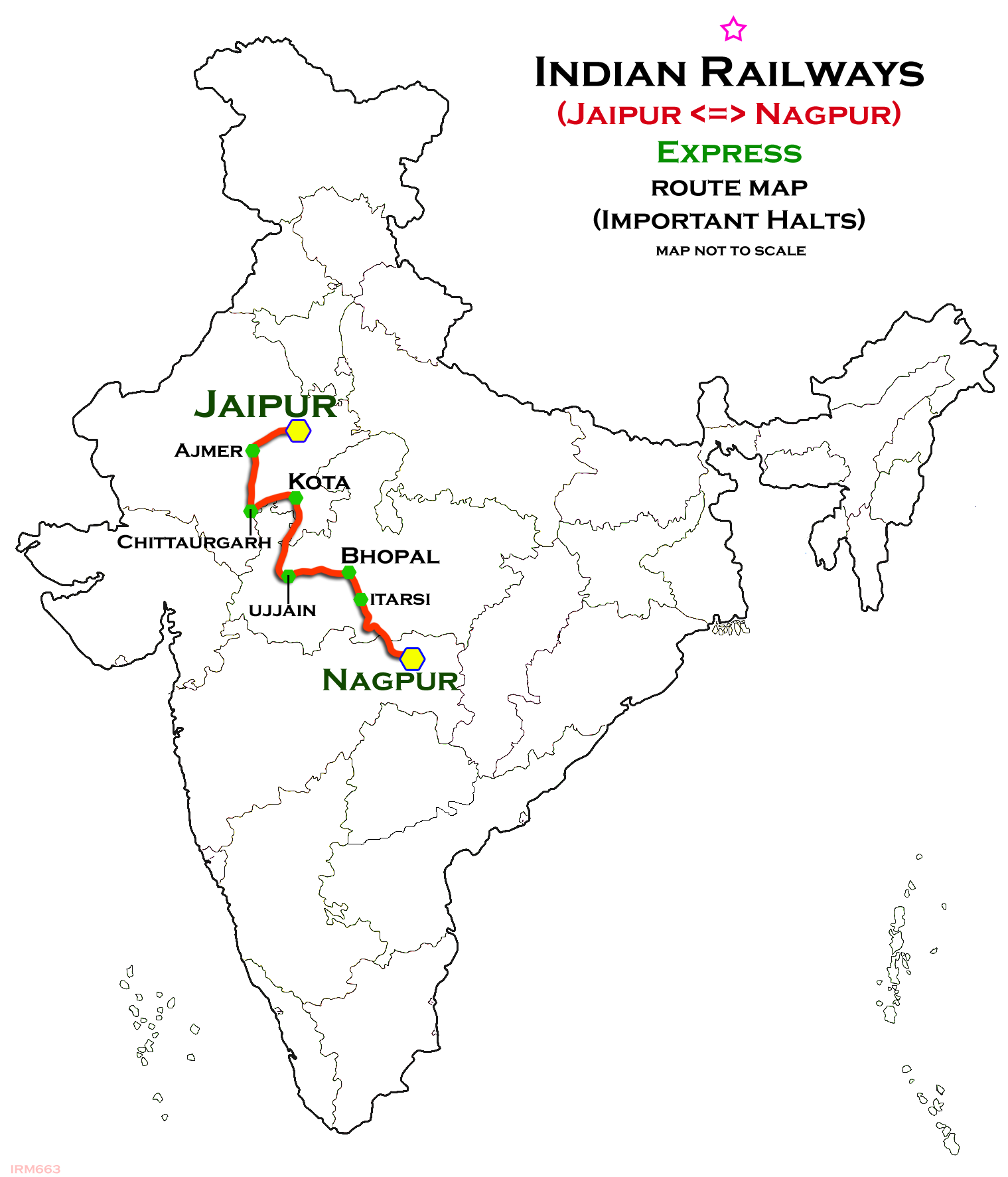

The 11203 / 11204 Jaipur–Nagpur Weekly Express is an Express train which runs between Nagpur Junction railway station of Nagpur in Maharashtra and Jaipur of Rajasthan. It is currently being operated with 11203/11204 train numbers on a daily basis.

== Service ==
The 11203/Nagpur–Jaipur Weekly Express has an average speed of 51 km/h and covers 1346 km in 26 hrs 10 mins. 11204/Jaipur–Nagpur Weekly Express has an average speed of 50 km/h and 1346 km in 26 hrs 45 mins.

== Route and halts ==
The important halts of the train are:

- Nagpur Junction
- Itarsi Junction
- Rani Kamalapati
- Bhopal Junction
- Ujjain Junction
- Nagda Junction
- Ramganj Mandi Junction
- Kota Junction
- Chittaurgarh Junction
- Bhilwara
- Ajmer Junction
- Jaipur Junction

== Coach composite ==
The train has standard ICF rakes with max speed of 110 kmph. The train consists of 20 coaches:

- 1 AC II Tier
- 1 AC III Tier
- 12 Sleeper coaches
- 4 General
- 2 Second-class Luggage/parcel van.

== Traction ==
Both trains are hauled by a Bhusaval Loco Shed-based WAP-4 locomotive from Nagpur to Kota and from Kota it is hauled by a Bhagat Ki Kothi Loco Shed-based WDP-4D or Ratlam Loco Shed-based WDM-3A of diesel locomotive up til Jaipur and vice versa.

== Direction reversal ==
Train reverses its direction 2 times:

- Chittaurgarh Junction
- Nagda Junction

== Rake sharing ==
The train shares its rake with 22137/22138 Prerana Express.
