= Veer Bhumi Chittaurgarh Express =

Train in India

Veer Bhumi Express
Overview
- Service type: Express
- Locale: Gujarat, Rajasthan & Madhya Pradesh
- First service: 2 August 2008; 17 years ago
- Current operator: Western Railway

Route
- Termini: Indore (INDB); Asarva (ASV)
- Stops: 30
- Distance travelled: 775 km (482 mi)
- Average journey time: 16 hrs 55 mins
- Service frequency: Daily
- Train number: 19315 / 19316

On-board services
- Classes: AC First, AC 2 Tier, AC 3 Tier, Sleeper Class, General Unreserved
- Seating arrangements: Yes
- Sleeping arrangements: Yes
- Catering facilities: On-board catering, E-catering
- Observation facilities: Large windows
- Baggage facilities: Available
- Other facilities: Below the seats

Technical
- Rolling stock: LHB coach
- Track gauge: 1,676 mm (5 ft 6 in)
- Operating speed: 46 km/h (29 mph) average including halts.
- Rake sharing: 22943/22944 Indore-Daund Superfast Express

The 19315 / 19316 Veer Bhumi Express is a daily train service which runs between Indore Junction railway station of Indore, Madhya Pradesh and Asarva in Ahmedabad, Gujarat via Chittorgarh and Udaipur, major cities in Rajasthan.

== History ==
The train is named after the erstwhile royal city of Chittorgarh. The train used to run between Indore and Udaipur via Ujjain, Ratlam, Mandsaur and Chittorgarh. It has been extended up to Asarva, near Ahmedabad from March 2023.

== Service ==
The 19315/Veer Bhumi Express has an average speed of 42 km/h and covers 479 km in 11 hrs 25 mins.

The 19316/Veer Bhumi Express has an average speed of 39 km/h and covers 479 km in 12 hrs 25 mins.

== Coach composition ==
The train consists of 22 LHB coaches :

- 1 AC First Class
- 2 AC II Tier
- 6 AC III Tier
- 8 Sleeper Class
- 3 General Unreserved
- 1 EoG
- 1 Seating Luggage Rake

== Route and halts ==
The important halts of the train are;

- Indore Junction
- Dewas Junction
- Ujjain Junction
- Nagda Junction
- Khachrod
- Ratlam Junction
- Jaora
- Mandsaur
- Neemuch
- Nimbahera
- Chittaurgarh Junction
- Kapasan
- Fatehnagar
- Mavli Junction
- Rana Pratap Nagar
- Udaipur City
- Dungarpur
- Himmatnagar Junction
- Asarva.

== Schedule ==
Train number	Station code	Departure station	Departure time	Departure day	Arrival station	Arrival time	Arrival day
19315	INDB	Indore Junction	17:40	Daily	Asarva	10:55 (Next Day)	Daily
19316	ASV	Asarva	14:15	Daily	Indore Junction	07:00 (Next Day)	Daily

== Rake sharing ==
The train shares its rake with 22943/22944 Indore-Daund Superfast Express.

== Direction reversal ==
The train reverses its direction once at;

- Ratlam Junction.

== Traction ==
It is hauled by a Vadodara Loco Shed-based WAP-5 / WAP-7 electric locomotive from Indore to Asarva and vice versa.

== See also ==
- Udaipur City railway station
- Indore Junction railway station
- Ratlam–Udaipur City Express
