= Mathura train collision =

Fatal train accident in India

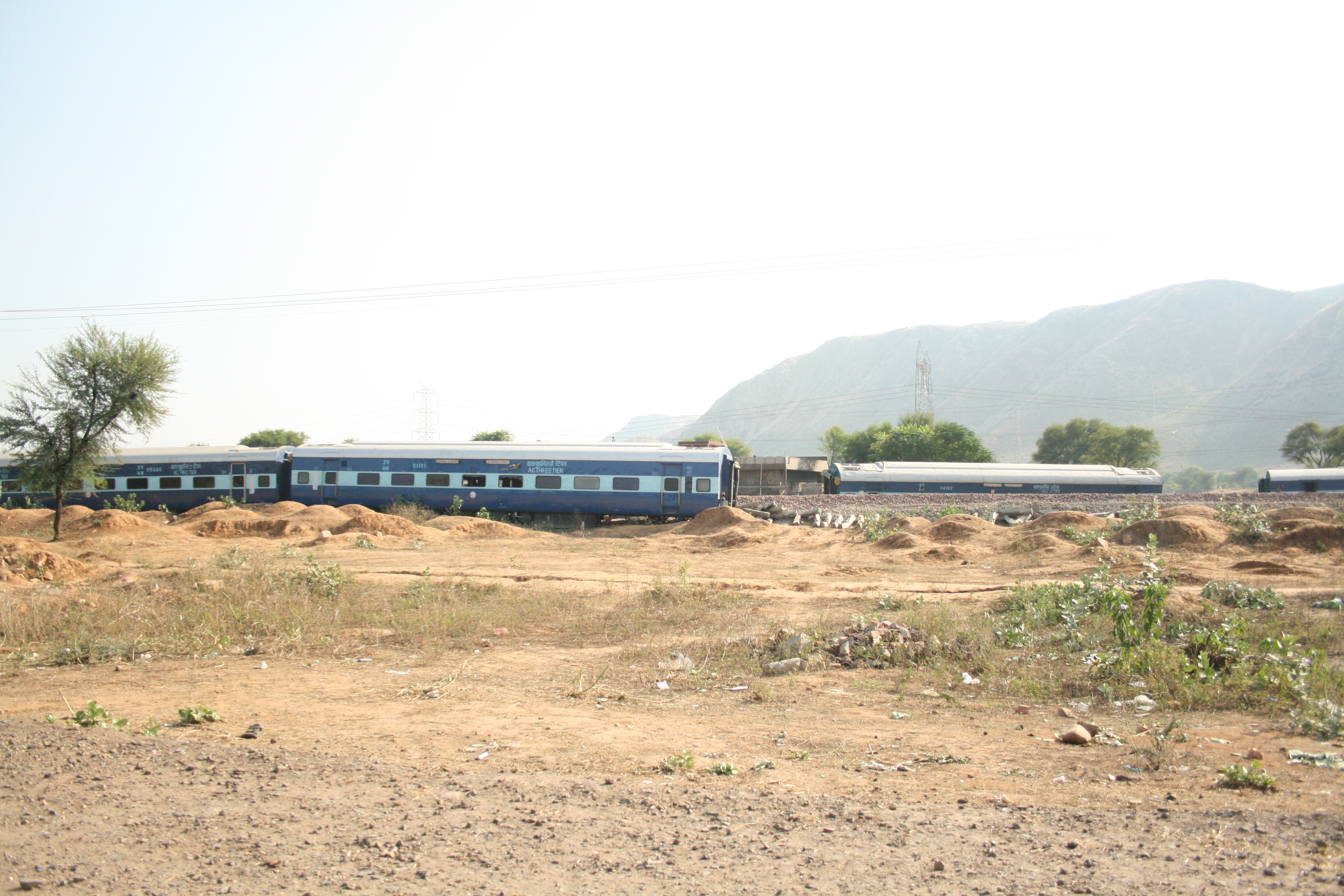
Picture of the derailed wagons days after the accident.

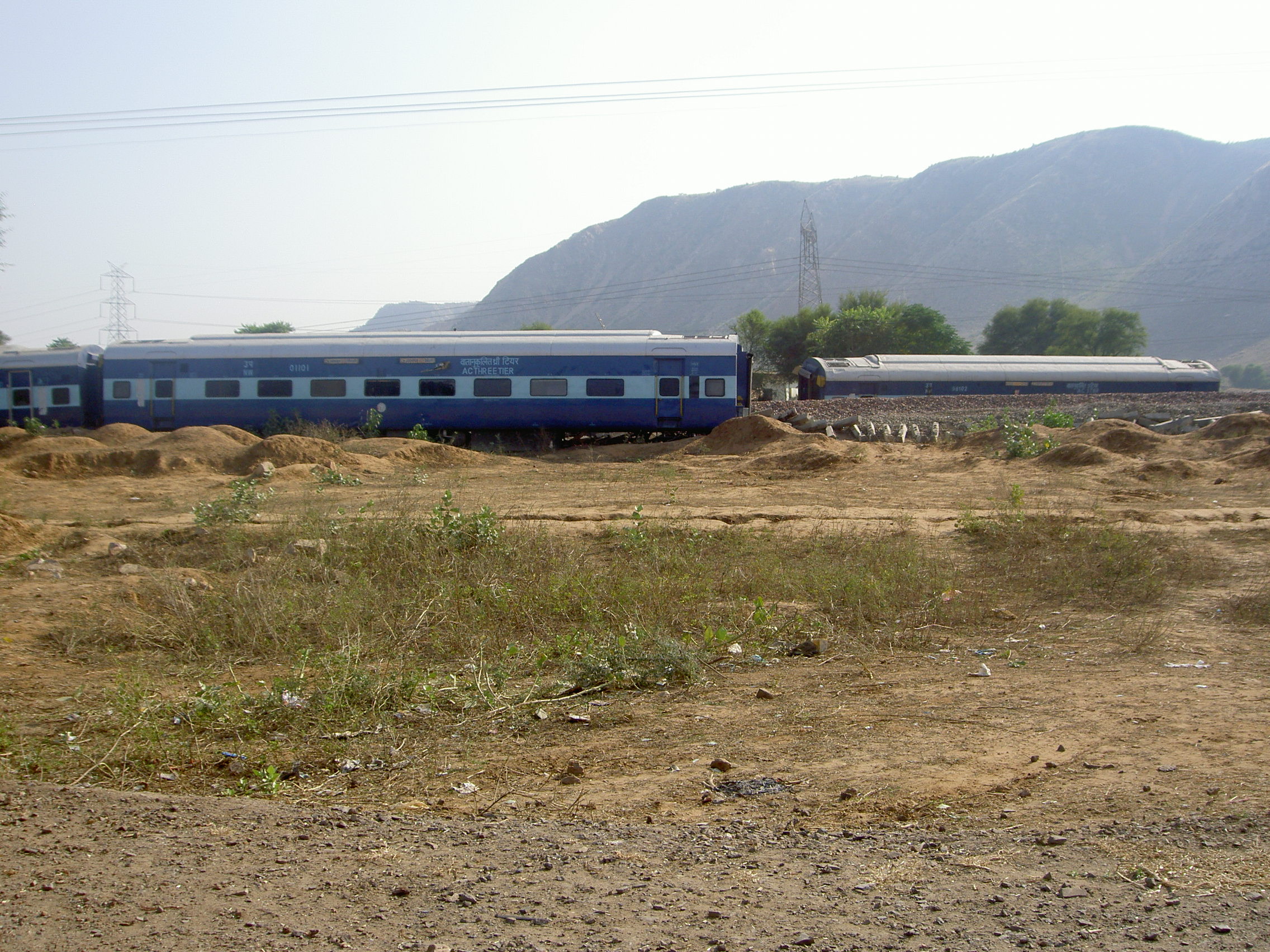
Another scene of the collision.

The Mathura train collision occurred at 05:00 local time (01:30 UTC) in dark conditions near Mathura, in the state of Uttar Pradesh, India, on Wednesday, 20 October 2009. At least ten people were initially feared dead in the incident. The collision occurred when Goa Express rammed into the stationary Mewar Express from behind at an outer signal, about 3 km from outer Mathura. Both the trains were headed for Delhi. Further details suggested that the death toll exceeded 20 people.

== Derailment ==
According to S S Khurana, the Chairman Railway Board, the Goa Express hit the other train from behind at 4:50 a.m. 3 km from the outer signal of the Mathura junction station. Several coaches of both trains were reduced to mangled heaps of metal. The Indian Army had to be summoned with sophisticated gas cutters for rescue work. The Mewar Express had come to a halt after Munna Sajid, an undertrial who was being escorted by Rajasthan policemen, pulled the chain. Sajid, an alleged dacoit who was being brought for a hearing in Delhi, reportedly escaped by jumping from the moving train. The railway ministry claimed that prima facie the accident was caused by "human error" and blamed the Goa Express drivers for failing to spot the signal warnings on the line. The driver, R K Chaturvedi, and assistant driver Laxmikant were taken off duty pending inquiry. An official said the driver was not drunk. "The engine of Goa Express ripped through the SLR van at the rear of the other train. Under the impact, the pantry car of the Goa Express which was at the farthest end of this train was also damaged. Two people in this coach -- both railway employees -- lost their lives," said SSP (Mathura) B D Paulson.

== Compensation ==
Railway minister Mamata Banerjee sought a Central Bureau of Investigation inquiry into the incident and announced an ex-gratia of Rs 5 lakh for the next of the kin of those killed in the train mishap. "The seriously injured passengers would receive Rs 1 lakh while those with minor injuries will get Rs 10,000," she said. In Mathura, UP agriculture minister Laxminarain Choudhry announced an ex-gratia of Rs 10 lakh for the next of the kin of the deceased besides offering a job.

== See also ==
- Uttar Pradesh train accidents
- List of Indian rail accidents
