= Ratlam–Udaipur City Express =

Train in India

Overview
- Service type: Express
- Current operator: West Central Railway zone

Route
- Termini: Ratlam Junction (RTM); Udaipur City (UDZ)
- Stops: 14
- Distance travelled: 306 km (190 mi)
- Average journey time: 7h 14m
- Service frequency: Weekly (Note: Runs one day in a week for every direction.)
- Train number: 19327/19328

On-board services
- Class: General Unreserved
- Seating arrangements: No
- Sleeping arrangements: Yes
- Catering facilities: No
- Observation facilities: ICF coach
- Entertainment facilities: No
- Baggage facilities: No
- Other facilities: Below the seats

Technical
- Rolling stock: 2
- Track gauge: 1,676 mm (5 ft 6 in)
- Operating speed: 42 km/h (26 mph), including halts

The Ratlam–Udaipur City Express is an Express train belonging to West Central Railway zone that runs between Ratlam Junction and Udaipur City in India. It is currently being operated with 19327/19328 train numbers on a daily basis.

== Service ==
The 19327/Ratlam Udaipur City Express has an average speed of 42 km/h and covers 306 km in 7h 14m. The 19328/Udaipur City–Ratlam Express has an average speed of 45 km/h and covers 306 km in 6h 45m.

== Route and halts ==
The important halts of the train are:

- Ratlam Junction
- Jaora
- Mandsaur
- Neemuch
- Jawad Road
- Chittaurgarh Junction
- Mavli Junction
- Rana Pratap Nagar
- Udaipur City

== Coach composition ==
The train has standard ICF rakes with max speed of 110 kmph. The train consists of 12 coaches:

- 10 General
- 2 Seating cum Luggage Rake

== Traction ==
Both trains are hauled by a Ratlam Loco Shed-based WDM-3A or WDM-2A diesel locomotive from Udaipur to Ratlam, and vice versa.

== Rake sharing ==
The trains shares its rake with 59811/59812 Haldighati Passenger and 59813/59814 Kota–Yamuna Bridge Agra Passenger

== See also ==
- Udaipur City railway station
- Ratlam Junction railway station
- Veer Bhumi Chittaurgarh Express
