= Fatehnagar =

Town in Rajasthan, India

- City ( Municipality)
- Nickname: FAN
- Location in Rajasthan, India Fatehnagar (India)
- Coordinates: 24.8572°N 74.0892°E
- Country: India
- State: Rajasthan
- District: Udaipur

Government
  - Type: municipality

Area
  - Total: 26.5 km^{2} (10.2 sq mi)
  - Rank: 1

Population (2011)
  - Total: 19,624
  - Density: 741/km^{2} (1,920/sq mi)

Languages
  - Official: Hindi
- Time zone: UTC+5:30 (IST)
- Postal code: 313206
- Vehicle registration: RJ 27

Fatehnagar is a city and municipality in Udaipur district in the state of Rajasthan, India.

== Demographics ==
As of 2001 India census, Fatehnagar had a population of 19,624. Males constituted 51% of the population and females 49%. Fatehnagar has an average literacy rate of 60%, almost identical to the national average of 59.5%: male literacy was 71%, and female literacy is 48%. Out of the population, 14% is under 6 years of age.
