= Bhopal–Jaipur Express =

Train in India

The Bhopal–Jaipur Express is a daily express train which runs between Bhopal Junction railway station of Bhopal, the capital city of Madhya Pradesh and Jaipur, the capital city of Rajasthan. It previously ran as the Bhopal–Ajmer Express from Bhopal to Ajmer, a pilgrimage spot in Rajasthan, and prior to that as the Bhopal–Ratlam Intercity Express.

== Number and nomenclature ==
The numbers for the train are :

- 19711: Jaipur to Bhopal
- 19712: Bhopal to Jaipur

The train was also known as Ajmeri Express which signifies the nearby destination of the train that is Ajmer

== Arrival and departure ==
Train number 19712 departs from Bhopal Junction daily at 17:00 hrs., reaching Jaipur, the next day at 09:30 hrs.

Train number 19711 departs from Jaipur daily at 17:25 hrs., reaching Bhopal Junction, the next day at 11:25 hrs.

== Route and halts ==
The train goes via Ujjain Junction–Ratlam Junction and Neemuch. The important halts of the train are:

- Bhopal Junction
- Sant Hirdaram Nagar
- Sehore
- Kalapipal
- Shujalpur
- Berchha
- Maksi Junction
- Ujjain Junction
- Nagda Junction
- Khachrod
- Ratlam Junction
- Jaora
- Mandsaur
- Neemuch
- Chittaurgarh Junction
- Bhilwara
- Nasirabad
- Ajmer Junction
- Kishangarh
- Phulera Junction
- Asalpur Jobner
- Jaipur

== Coach composite ==
The train consists of 17 coaches:

- 1 AC II
- 5 AC III
- 3 AC ECONOMY
- 10 SLEEPER
- 4 GENERAL

== Link service ==
According to the rail budget as on 24 February 2010, a link service 19655A/19656A Indore–Ajmer Link Express also started to run on back coaches of this train after Ujjain Junction. A total of 7 additional coaches are attached to the train from Ratlam out of which:

- 1 AC II
- 4 SLEEPER
- 2 GENERAL COACH

== Average speed ==
The train runs daily from both the sites with an average speed of 66 kilometres per hour (41 mph).

== History ==
This train was introduced in 2009 and was the only direct connection from Bhopal/Indore to Ajmer. It replaced the 9303/9304 Bhopal–Ratlam Intercity Express and the 9657/9658 Ratlam–Ajmer Night Express. Its route was extended to Jaipur as Bhopal–Jaipur Express as announced on 25 February 2011 in the Railway Budget.

== Other trains from Bhopal to Ajmer ==
- Kolkata–Ajmer Express
- Hyderabad–Ajmer Express
- Pune–Jaipur Express

== Bhopal–Ratlam Intercity Express ==
The Bhopal–Ratlam Intercity Express was a daily Intercity Express which ran between Bhopal Junction railway station of Bhopal, the capital city of Madhya Pradesh and Ratlam Junction railway station of Ratlam in Western Madhya Pradesh. The train was numbered 9303/9304. The main halts of the train were Bairagarh, Sehore, Shujalpur, Ujjain and Nagda. Later Khachrod was also added to the halt list. It used to run on a daily basis with an average speed of 62 km/h (39 mph).

In 2009 it was replaced by 9655/9656 Bhopal–Ajmer Express, which was extended in 2011 to Jaipur as the Bhopal–Jaipur Express.
