= Mysuru–Varanasi Express =

Express train

Mysore–Varanasi SF Express
Overview
- Service type: Weekly Superfast Express
- Status: Operating
- First service: 25 December 2014; 11 years ago
- Current operator: South Western Railway zone

Route
- Termini: Mysore Junction (MYS); Varanasi Junction (BSB)
- Stops: 32
- Distance travelled: 2,707 km (1,682 mi)
- Average journey time: 48h 55m
- Service frequency: Twice (Note: Runs two days in a week for every direction.)
- Train number: 22687/22688

On-board services
- Classes: AC II Tier, AC III Tier, Sleeper class, General Unreserved
- Seating arrangements: No
- Sleeping arrangements: Yes
- Catering facilities: On-board catering E-catering
- Observation facilities: LHB coach
- Entertainment facilities: No
- Baggage facilities: No
- Other facilities: Below the seats

Technical
- Rolling stock: 2
- Track gauge: 1,676 mm (5 ft 6 in)
- Electrification: Fully Electrified
- Operating speed: 71 km/h (44 mph), including halts
Route map
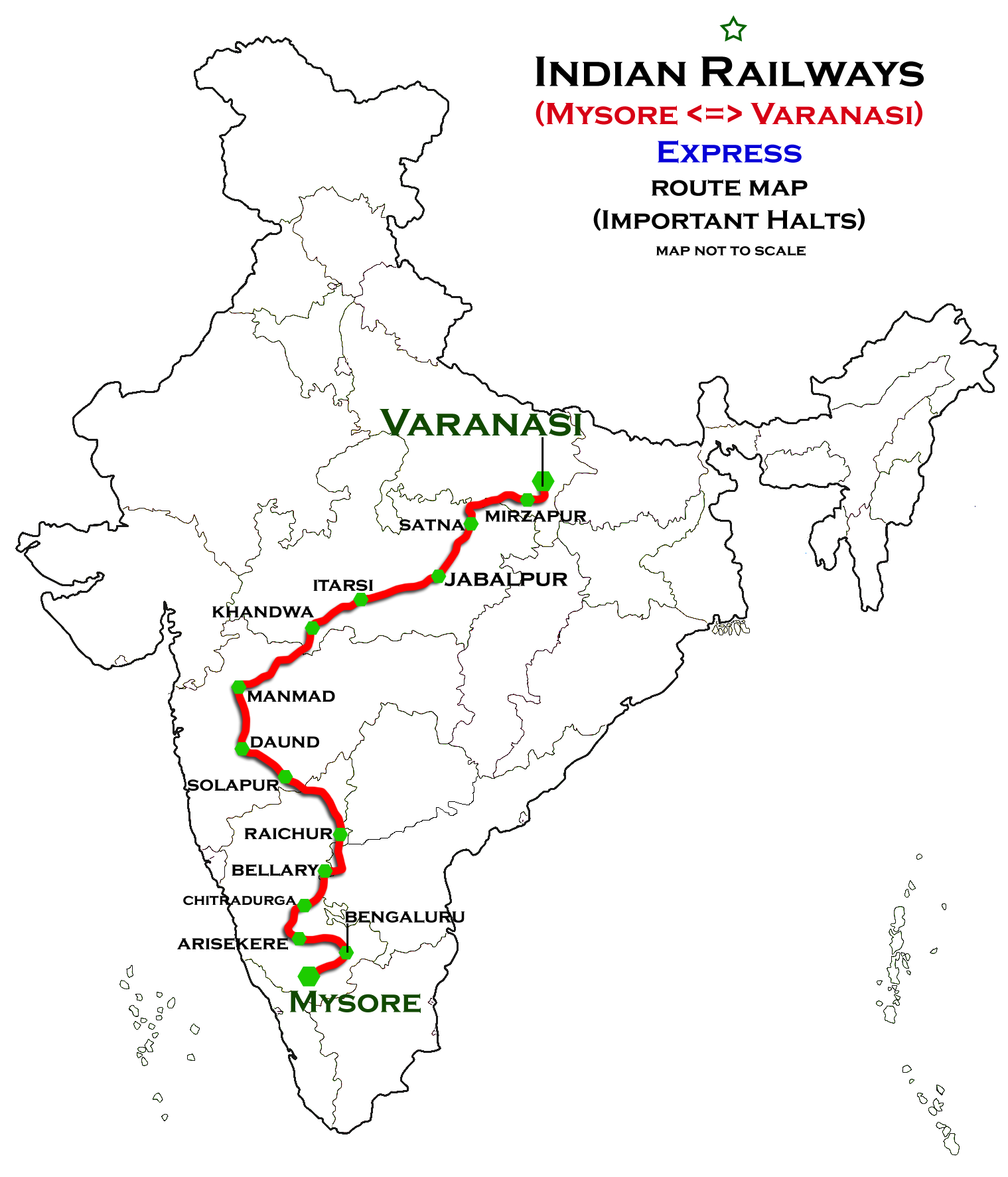

The Mysuru–Varanasi Superfast Express is an Superfast Express train belonging to the South Western Railway zone in India. It runs twice a week between Mysuru Junction and Varanasi Junction, using train numbers 22687/22688.

== Service ==
The 22687/Mysuru–Varanasi Express has an average speed of 55 km/h and covers 2708 km in 48h 45m. 22688/Varanasi–Mysuru Express has an average speed of 55 km/h and covers 2707 km in 48h 50m.

== Schedule ==
Train number	Station code	Departure station	Departure time	Departure day	Arrival station	Arrival time	Arrival day
22687	MYS	Mysore Junction	07:30 AM	TUE THU	Varanasi Junction	08:25 AM	THU SAT
22688	BSB	Varanasi Junction	9:10 PM	THU SAT	Mysore Junction	10:00 PM PM	SAT MON

== Reversals ==
GTL – Guntakal Junction

== Route and halts ==
The important halts of the train are:

- Mysore Junction
- Mandya
- Kengeri
- Bangalore City
- Yesvantpur Junction
- Tumkur
- Arsikere Junction
- Kadur Junction
- Chitradurga
- Bellary Junction
- Guntakal Junction (reversal)
- Adoni
- Mantralayam Road
- Raichur
- Yadgir
- Wadi Junction
- Kalaburagi Junction
- Solapur
- Daund Junction
- Ahilyanagar
- Kopargaon
- Manmad Junction
- Bhusaval Junction
- Khandwa Junction
- Itarsi Junction
- Pipariya
- Narsinghpur
- Jabalpur Junction
- Katni Junction
- Maihar
- Satna Junction
- Prayagraj
- Cheoki Junction
- Mirzapur
- Varanasi Junction

== Coach composition ==
The train has brand new LHB rakes with a maximum speed of 130 km/h. The train consists of 21 coaches:

- 2 AC II Tier
- 6 AC III Tier
- 9 Sleeper coaches
- 2 General
- 2 Generators cum Luggage/parcel van

== Traction ==
earlier was WDP-4D. Both trains are hauled by a Krishnarajapuram Loco Shed-based WAP-7 electric locomotive from Mysore to Varanasi and vice versa.

== Direction reversal ==
Train reverses its direction once:

- Guntakal Junction
