= Sant Hirdaram Nagar railway station =

Railway station in Madhya Pradesh, India

Sant Hirdaram Nagar
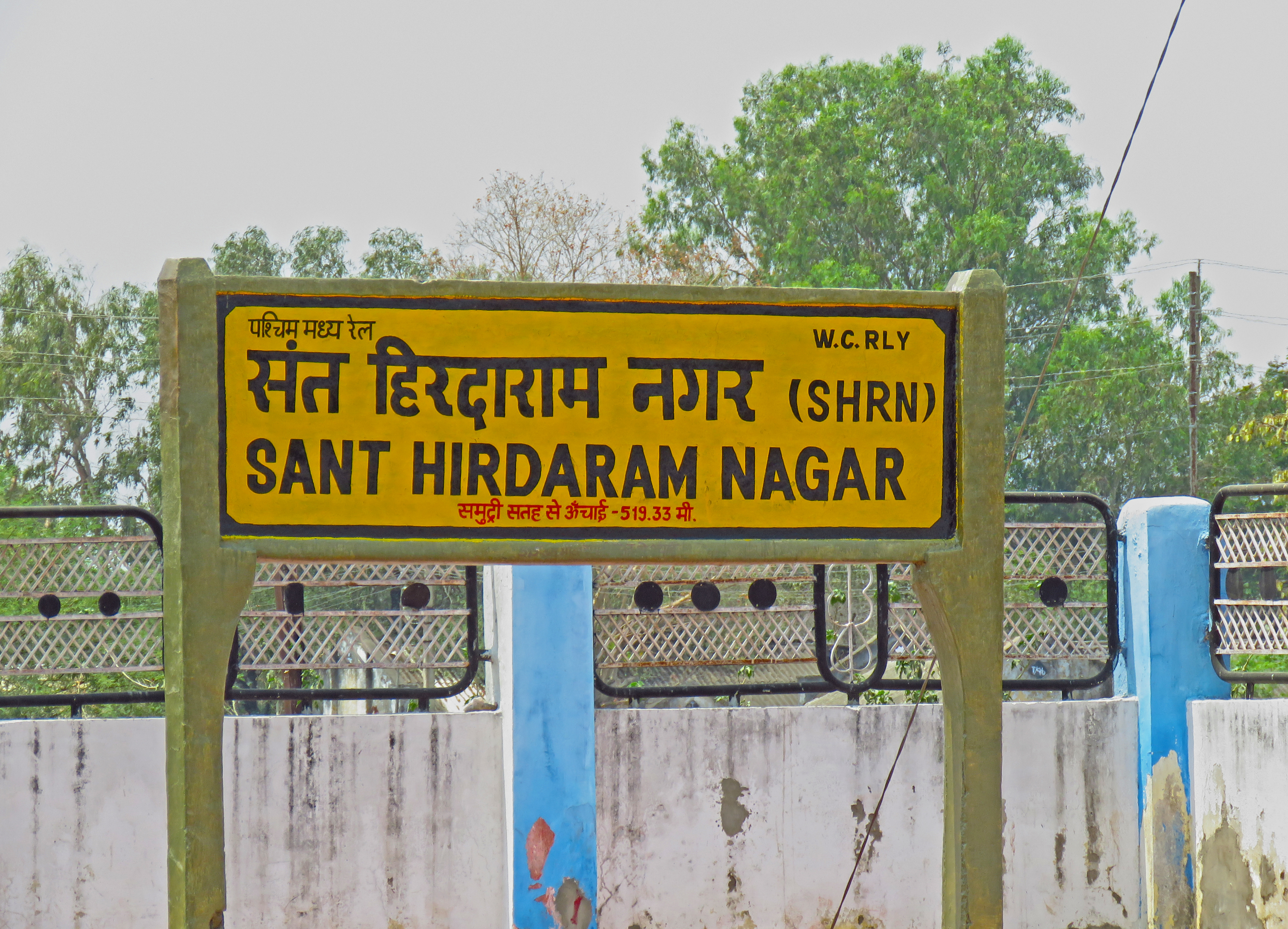

General information
- Location: NH 86, Sant Hirdaram Nagar, Bhopal, Madhya Pradesh; India
- Coordinates: 23.2738077°N 77.3336668°E
- Elevation: 524 metres (1,719 ft)
- System: Express, Suburban train and Passenger train station
- Owner: Indian Railways
- Operator: West Central Railway
- Platforms: 2
- Tracks: 4
- Connections: Auto stand, BRTS.

Construction
- Structure type: Standard (on-ground station)
- Parking: Yes
- Cycle facilities: Yes

Other information
- Status: Functioning
- Station code: SHRN
- Zone(s): West Central Railway
- Division(s): Bhopal

Services
Preceding station	Indian Railways	Following station
Bhopal Junction towards ?	Western Railway zone Ujjain-Sehore-Bhopal section	Bakanian Bhaunri towards ?
Location
- Interactive map

Sant Hirdaram Nagar (Station Code: SHRN) is a railway station in Bhopal, the capital of Madhya Pradesh. It is operated by West Central Railway from February 1, 2018. Previously the station was named "Bairagarh(BIH)" and was operated under Ratlam Division of Western Railway.

== Development ==
The renovation of Sant Hirdaram Nagar station was completed in 2021 by the West Central Railway zone of Indian Railways. In the same year, coach guidance systems which display the code and coach number of an oncoming train were installed on the station, thus upgrading facilities. Recently, a proposal to upgrade the waiting hall for passengers, due to the increased footfall was made.
