= Berchha =

- Town
- Location in Madhya Pradesh, India
- Coordinates: 23.28°N 76.33°E
- Country: India
- State: Madhya Pradesh

Berchha (Village ID 472768) is a Gram Panchayat in Shajapur tehsil of Shajapur District, Madhya Pradesh, India. According to the 2011 census, it has a population of 8157 living in 1587 households.

== Geography ==
Located in Ujjain division at coordinates 23.284978 N, 76.334453 E, it is an important railway station on the Bhopal-Ujjain-Indore route, with station code BCH. Berchha is 16 Km away from Shajapur District headquarter and 12 km away from the town Sundersi.

== Demographics ==
Berchha has a total of 1,587 families residing. Berchha has a population of 8,157 of which 4,258 are males while 3,899 are females as per the 2011 population census.

In Berchha the population of children aged 0–6 is 1,171 which makes up 14.36% of the total population. The average sex ratio of Berchha is 916 which is lower than the Madhya Pradesh state average of 931. The child sex ratio for the Berchha as per census is 859, lower than the Madhya Pradesh average of 918.

Berchha has a higher literacy rate compared to Madhya Pradesh. In 2011, the literacy rate of Berchha was 77.00% compared to 69.32% of Madhya Pradesh. In Berchha male literacy stands at 87.95% while female literacy rate was 65.16%.
