= Mathura–Gangapur City–Kota section =

Railway line in India

Mathura–Vadodara section
- Kota Junction is an Important railway station on Mathura–Vadodara section

Overview
- Native name: मथुरा वड़ोदरा सेक्शन
- Status: Operational
- Owner: Indian Railways
- Locale: Uttar Pradesh Rajasthan Madhya Pradesh Gujarat
- Termini: Mathura; Vadodara

Service
- Operator(s): North Central Railway, West Central Railway and Western Railway for main line and North Western Railway for other lines
- Depot: Vadodara
- Rolling stock: WAP-4 and WAG-7

History
- Opened: 1866

Technical
- Track length: Main line: 852 km (529 mi); Branch Lines:Jaipur–Sawai Madhopur132 km (82 mi); Ajmer–Ratlam 375 km (233 mi); Udaipur–Kota 292 km (181 mi); Godhra–Anand 79 km (49 mi)
- Track gauge: 5 ft 6 in (1,676 mm) broad gauge
- Electrification: 25 kV 50 Hz AC OHLE in 1976-77
- Operating speed: Main line: up to 160 km/h

The Mathura–Vadodara section is a railway line connecting Mathura and Vadodara. This section is part of Delhi–Mumbai line. This section includes Jaipur–Sawai Madhopur, Ajmer–Ratlam and Udaipur–Kota for branching and connectivity to this section.

This section deals primarily with cross traffic consisting of fertilizer, cement, oil, salt, food grains, oil seeds, limestone and gypsum traffic. Container loading is done from here in bulk.

== Subsections of Mathura–Vadodara Section ==
=== Subsection-1 Jaipur–Sawai Madhopur ===
Station	Km
Jaipur Junction	0
Durgapura	7
Sanganer	12
Shivdaspura Padampura	29
Chaksu	42
Channani	53
Bansthali Niwai	66
Siras	81
Isarda	92
Sureli	100
Chauth Ka Barwara	109
Devpura	120
Sawai Madhopur Junction	132

=== Subsection-2 Ajmer–Ratlam ===
Station	Km
Ajmer Junction	0
Adarshnagar	5
Hatundi	11
Lachhipura	15
Rajosi	18
Nasirabad	23
Jharwasaa	34
Bandanwara	42
Singwal	52
Mokampura	58
Bijainagar	65
Gulabpura	67
Rupaheli	78
Bhojras	81
Sareri	91
Ralia Road	98
Lambiya	104
Dhuwala	114
Mandal	121
Bhilwara	132
Mandpiya	142
Hamirgarh	150
Soniyana	156
Gangrar	164
Det	171
Chanderiya	179
Chittaurgarh Junction	186
Shambhupura	198
Gambhiri Road	207
Nimbahera	215
Jawad Road	226
Biswas Kalan	232
Nimach	242
Hariya Khal	251
Malhargarh	263
Pipila	271
Mandsor	287
Dalauda	302
Kachnara	314
Dhodhar	322
Jaora	338
Brayla Chaurasi	347
Namli	358
Ratlam Junction	375

=== Subsection-3 Udaipur–Kota ===
Station	Km
Udaipur City	0
Ranapratapnagar	4
Debari	14
Khemli	24
Bhimal	36
Mavli Junction	43
Fatehnagar	56
Bhupalsagar	69
Kapasan	79
Pandoli	88
Ghorsunda	102
Chittaurgarh Junction	114
Chanderiya	121
Basi Beriasal	137
Parsoli	154
Barundini	163
Mandalgarh	179
Shampura	195
Bundi	247
Thalera	261
Gurla	280
Kota Junction	285

=== Subsection-4 Godhra–Anand ===
Station	Km
Godhra Junction	0
Vavadi Khurd	7
Tuwa	15
Timba Road	22
Sevaliya	27
Angadi	33
Thasra	40
Dakor	49
Umreth	57
Od	64
Bhalej	72
Sadanapura	74
Anand Junction	78

== History ==
Neemuch–Nasirabad railway construction planning was made for joining Rajputana railway and Nasirabad Scindia railway to Neemuch. Although the survey of Neemuch–Nasirabad railway was carried out in the year 1871–72, the construction was started in the year 1879, and the work completed in March 1881.

GIPR's first BG tracks used 65 lb/yd double-headed rails made of wrought iron. Rails of 80 lb/yd were common (e.g., Indian Midland Railway). Both flat-bottomed and bull-headed rails were commonly used. MG railways started off with 40 lb/yd rails, although 30 lb/yd rails were also used. The Barsi Light Railway used 30 lb/yd rails. The Rajputana Malwa Railway used 50 lb rails.

The first broad gauge line of the division from Godhra to Limkheda was completed in the year 1893 and Limkheda–Dahod, Ratlam line was completed and opened for traffic in the year 1894, while the Ratlam–Nagda–Ujjain BG line completed and opened for traffic during the year 1896.

The whole management of this line was under (BB & CI) Bombay, Baroda & Central India Railway till independence i.e. up to 15.08.1947.

The first rail line in Rajputana, Agra–Bharatpur was built in 1873 under Rajputana–Malwa railway. It was extended up to Ajmer on 1 August 1875 and further extended up to Naseerabad on 14 February 1876. The total length of railways in Rajputana, including the British District of Ajmer–Merwara, was 652 miles in 1881, 943 in 1891, 1,359 in 1901, and 1,576 miles in 1906 A.D., Out of which 739 miles track was the property of the Government of India and the rest was owned by various Native States. Out of 1,576 miles track, 1,528 miles track was on the metre-gauge system and only 48 miles track was on narrow-gauge system.

Some states undertook extension of railways by financing the cost and entrusting the work of construction either to the British Government or to one of the companies already running a railway line. The Sanganer–Sawai Madhopur railway was planned by Jaipur state in this way in 1884–85. The total cost of the line was about Rs. 25 lakhs. The railway line was so planned that it avoided the states of Tonk and Bundi and connected two important trade centres – Sambhar Salt area and the Harauti grain belt. It was hoped that it would make good returns on investment.

The remaining railway line in Rajasthan was the Udaipur–Chitor, a portion of the Bina–Guna–Baran. It connected the towns after which it was named. It was 67 miles in length, and was the property of the Udaipur Durbar, by whom it was constructed between 1895 and 1899, and by whom it was working since 1898. The capital expenditure up to the end of 1904 was nearly 21 lakhs, and the net profits average about 5 per cent.

== Electrification ==
The electrification from Baroda to New Delhi was subsequently taken up during the year 1984. At present the total route kilometres of electrification is more than 800 km in this section.

== Loco sheds and workshops ==
A wagon workshop at Kota which are engaged in the activity of heavy repairs to passenger coaches and POH of goods wagons especially of oil tank wagons.

Ratlam loco shed holds 100 locos including WDM-2, WDM-3A, WDM-3D, WDG-3A, WDS-6, WDG-4. Vadodara loco shed holds more than 150 locos including WAG-5HA / WAG5HB, WAG-7.

== Speed limits ==
Mathura–Ratlam and Ratlam–Vadodara section Comes in B-class Section in this class allows speeds up to 130 km/h. Mumbai Rajdhani Express runs at the top speed of 130kmph in this section.
