= Bharatpur Junction railway station =

Railway Station in Rajasthan, India

Coordinates: 27.2364°N 77.4882°E

Bharatpur Junction
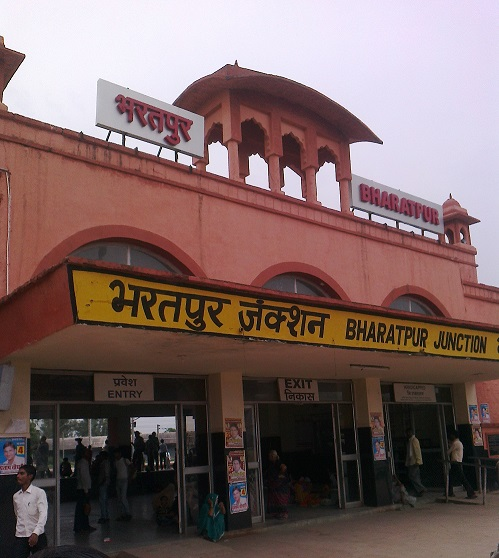
- The facade of Bharatpur Junction in 2012

General information
- Location: Bharatpur, Rajasthan; India
- System: Express train and Passenger train station
- Owner: Indian Railways
- Operator: West Central Railway zone
- Lines: New Delhi–Mumbai main line, Bharatpur–Agra via Achhnera railway line, Bharatpur–Mathura via Achhnera railway line, Bharatpur–Bandikui railway line
- Platforms: 5
- Tracks: Broad gauge 1,676 mm (5 ft 6 in)
- Train operators: West Central Railway

Construction
- Structure type: Standard (On ground station)
- Parking: available

Other information
- Status: Active
- Station code: BTE
- Fare zone: West Central Railways
Location

Bharatpur Junction is a railway station located on the Mathura–Kota section of the New Delhi–Mumbai main line of Indian Railways in Bharatpur, Rajasthan. It is an important station of the West Central Railway zone (WCR) and has the status of Grade A station.

Bharatpur Junction has five platforms and all are electrified. Apart from the Delhi – Mumbai main line, the Agra–Bandikui–Jaipur line also passes through Bharatpur Junction. The former line is electrified, while the latter is still plying on diesel.

Keoladeo National Park is located approximately 5 km from the Bharatpur Railway Station.
