= Khachrod =

- town
- Location in Madhya Pradesh, India Khachrod (India)
- Coordinates: 23.42°N 75.28°E
- Country: India
- State: Madhya Pradesh
- District: Ujjain
- Elevation: 485 m (1,591 ft)
- Time zone: UTC+5:30 (IST)
- Postal code: 456224

Khachrod is a town and municipality in Ujjain district in the Indian state of Madhya Pradesh. It's also a tehsil headquarter.

== Geography ==
Khachrod is located at 23.42°N 75.28°E. It sits at an elevation of 485 metres (1591 feet).

== Climate ==
Climate of the city features a typical version of the humid subtropical climate (Köppen Cwa). Summers usually starts by the middle of March which lasts up until late June.

== Demographics ==
The Khacharod Municipality has population of 34,191 of which 17,351 are males while 16,840 are females as per Census 2011.

== Government And Administration ==
Khachrod Belongs to Nagda-Khachrod Assembly constituency is one of the 230 Vidhan Sabha (State Legislative Assembly) constituencies of Madhya Pradesh state in central India. Dilip Singh Gurjar is current mla from Khachrod.

Khacharod is a Municipality city. Khacharod city is divided into 21 wards for which elections are held every 5 years. Khacharod Municipality has total administration over 6,239 houses to which it supplies basic amenities like water and sewerage.

== Transportation ==
Khachrod railway station : Khachrod railway station is a railway station of Ratlam division, Western Railways situated on the very middle of Mumbai–Delhi main line. Its code is KUH. It serves Khachrod city.
