= Udaipur City–Yog Nagari Rishikesh Express =

Train in India

Overview
- Service type: Express
- First service: 28 July 2017; 7 years ago
- Current operator(s): North Western Railway

Route
- Termini: Udaipur City (UDZ); Yog Nagari Rishikesh (YNRK)
- Stops: 34
- Distance travelled: 998 km (620 mi)
- Average journey time: 20hrs 35mins
- Service frequency: Tri-weekly (Note: Runs three days in a week for every direction.)
- Train number(s): 19609 / 19610

On-board services
- Class(es): AC 2 tier, AC 3 tier, Sleeper Class, General Unreserved
- Seating arrangements: No
- Sleeping arrangements: Yes
- Catering facilities: E-catering only
- Observation facilities: Large windows
- Baggage facilities: No
- Other facilities: Below the seats

Technical
- Rolling stock: LHB coach
- Track gauge: 1,676 mm (5 ft 6 in)
- Operating speed: 48 km/h (30 mph), average including halts.

The 19609 / 19610 Udaipur City–Yog Nagari Rishikesh Express is an Express train belonging to North Western Railway zone that runs between Udaipur City and Yog Nagari Rishikesh in India. It is currently being operated with 19609/19610 train numbers on a tri-weekly basis.

== Service ==
The 19609 Udaipur City–Yog Nagari Rishikesh Express has an average speed of 48 km/h and covers 998 km in 20hrs 35mins. The 19610 Yog Nagari Rishikesh–Udaipur City Express has an average speed of 48 km/h and covers 998 km in 20hrs 35mins.

== Route & halts ==
The important halts of the train are:

- Udaipur City
- Chittaurgarh Junction
- Bhilwara
- Ajmer Junction
- Kishangarh
- Phulera Junction
- Jaipur Junction
- Gandhinagar Jaipur
- Dausa
- Alwar Junction
- Rewari Junction
- Old Delhi Junction
- Delhi Shahdara Junction
- Baraut
- Shamli
- Roorkee
- Haridwar
- Yog Nagari Rishikesh

== Coach composition ==
The train has standard LHB rakes with a max speed of 130 kmph. The train consists of 16 coaches:

- 1 AC II Tier
- 3 AC III Tier
- 1 AC Economy
- 5 Sleeper coaches
- 4 General Unreserved
- 1 Seating cum Luggage Rake
- 1 EOG

== Traction ==
Both trains are hauled by a Bhagat Ki Kothi Loco Shed-based WAP-7 electric locomotive on its entire journey.

== Direction reversal ==
The train reverses its direction once at:

- Chittaurgarh Junction.

== See also ==
- Udaipur City railway station
- Yog Nagari Rishikesh railway station
