= Mandsaur railway station =

Railway station in Madhya Pradesh

Mandsaur

General information
- Location: Mandsaur, Madhya Pradesh; India
- Coordinates: 24.075286°N 75.076364°E
- Elevation: 365 m (1,198 ft)
- System: Indian Railway Station
- Owner: Indian Railways
- Operator: Western Railway
- Line: Ajmer–Ratlam section
- Platforms: 2
- Tracks: 3
- Connections: Taxi stand, Auto stand

Construction
- Structure type: Standard (on ground station)
- Parking: Available
- Cycle facilities: Available
- Accessible: Disabled access

Other information
- Status: Active
- Station code: MDS
- Zone(s): Western Railway
- Division(s): Ratlam
Location
- Location within Madhya Pradesh Location within India

Mandsaur railway station is the main station in Mandsaur, a city in Madhya Pradesh, India. Its code is MDS. Mandsaur is B – category railway station of Western Railway Zone on the Ajmer – Ratlam section. The station consists of two platforms.

Mandsaur is connected to Ratlam, Ujjain via Nagda and Kota, Bundi via Chittorgarh.
