= Udaipur City–Jaipur Intercity Express =

Train in India

Udaipur City-Jaipur Intercity Express
Overview
- Service type: Intercity Express
- Current operator: North Western Railway

Route
- Termini: Udaipur City (UDZ); Jaipur (JP)
- Stops: 13
- Distance travelled: 435 km (270 mi)
- Average journey time: 7 hours 30 minutes
- Service frequency: Daily
- Train number: 12991 / 12992

On-board services
- Classes: AC First Class, AC Chair Car, Second Class Seating, General Unreserved
- Seating arrangements: Yes
- Sleeping arrangements: Yes
- Catering facilities: No
- Observation facilities: Large windows
- Baggage facilities: Available
- Other facilities: Below the seats

Technical
- Rolling stock: LHB coach
- Track gauge: 1,676 mm (5 ft 6 in)
- Operating speed: 59 km/h (37 mph) average including halts.

The 12991 / 12992 Udaipur City–Jaipur Intercity Express is an intercity express train belonging to Indian Railways – North Western Railway zone that runs between Udaipur City and Jaipur in India.

It operates as train number 12991 from Udaipur City to Jaipur and as train number 12992 in the reverse direction serving the state of Rajasthan.

== Coaches ==
The 12991 / 92 Udaipur City–Jaipur Intercity Express has 1 First Class, 2 AC Chair Car, 2 Second Class seating, 11 General Unreserved and 2 SLR (Seating cum Luggage Rake) coaches. It does not carry a pantry car.

As is customary with most train services in India, coach composition may be amended at the discretion of Indian Railways depending on demand.

== Service ==
The 12991 / 92 Udaipur City–Jaipur Intercity Express covers the distance of 435 km (270 mi) in 7 hours 30 mins (58.00 km/h) in both directions.

As the average speed of the train is above 55 km/h (34 mph), as per Indian Railways rules, its fare includes a Superfast surcharge.

== Routing ==
The 12991 / 92 Udaipur City–Jaipur Express runs from Udaipur City via Mavli Junction, Chittaurgarh, Ajmer Junction to Jaipur.

It reverses direction of travel at Chittaurgarh.

== Traction ==
As entire route is fully electrified, an Abu Road-based WAP-4 locomotive powers the train for its entire journey.

== Operation ==
12991 Udaipur City–Jaipur Intercity Express leaves Udaipur City on a daily basis and reaches Jaipur the same day.

12992 Jaipur–Udaipur City Intercity Express leaves Jaipur on a daily basis and reaches Udaipur City the same day.
