= Bhilwara railway station =

Railway station in Rajasthan, India

General information
- Location: Opposite Circuit House, State Highway 12, Shastri Nagar, Bhilwara, Rajasthan; India
- Coordinates: 25.3452°N 74.6315°E
- Elevation: 426 metres (1,398 ft)
- Owner: Indian Railways
- Operator: North Western Railway
- Line: Jaipur–Ratlam line
- Platforms: 4
- Tracks: 4 (single electrified 5 ft 6 in (1,676 mm) broad gauge)
- Connections: Auto stand

Construction
- Structure type: Standard (on ground station)
- Parking: Yes
- Cycle facilities: No

Other information
- Status: Functioning
- Station code: BHL
- Zone(s): North Western Railway
- Division(s): Ajmer
Location

Bhilwara railway station is the railway station in Bhilwara district, Rajasthan. Its code is BHL. It serves Bhilwara city. The station consists of four platforms and two entrances. The platforms are well sheltered. It has basic amenities including Wifi in partnership with Google. It is in A category Railway Station

The station is connected to Ajmer, Jodhpur, Jaipur, Kota, Udaipur, Indore, Kolkata, Ujjain, Bhopal, Ratlam, Delhi, Bharatpur, Agra, Gwalior, Jhansi, Lucknow, Kanpur, Allahabad, Patna, Kolkata, Vadodara, Surat, Mumbai and Hyderabad almost all big cities.

== Major trains ==
Some of the important trains that run from Bhilwara are:

- Ratlam–Bhilwara DMU
- Jammu Tawi–Udaipur Superfast Garib Rath Special
- Yesvantpur–Jaipur Suvidha Express
- Chetak Express
- Jaipur–Udaipur City Intercity Express
- Ananya Express
- Hyderabad–Ajmer Superfast Express
- Bandra Terminus–Jaipur Superfast Special Fare Special
- Udaipur–Jaipur Superfast Special
- Ajmer–Bandra Superfast Express
- Ajmer–Hyderabad Weekly Express
- Jaipur–Nagpur Weekly Express
- Jaipur–Bhopal Express
- Santragachi–Ajmer Weekly Express
- Ajmer–Hyderabad SpecialFare Urs Special
- Sare Jahan Se Achchha Express
- Udaipur City–New Jalpaiguri Weekly Express
- Ongole–Ajmer SpecialFare Urs Special
- Bhagalpur–Ajmer Express
- Ratlam–Ajmer Express
- Hazur Sahib Nanded–Ajmer SpecialFare Special
- Udaipur City–Khajuraho Express
- Indore–Jaipur Express via Ajmer
- Kolkata–Ajmer Express
- Kacheguda–Ajmer SpecialFare Urs Special
- Ajmer–Machilipatnam SpecialFare Urs Link Special
- Udaipur–Ajmer Passenger
