= Nagda =

Industrial town in Madhya Pradesh, India

Nagda Nagda
- Municipality
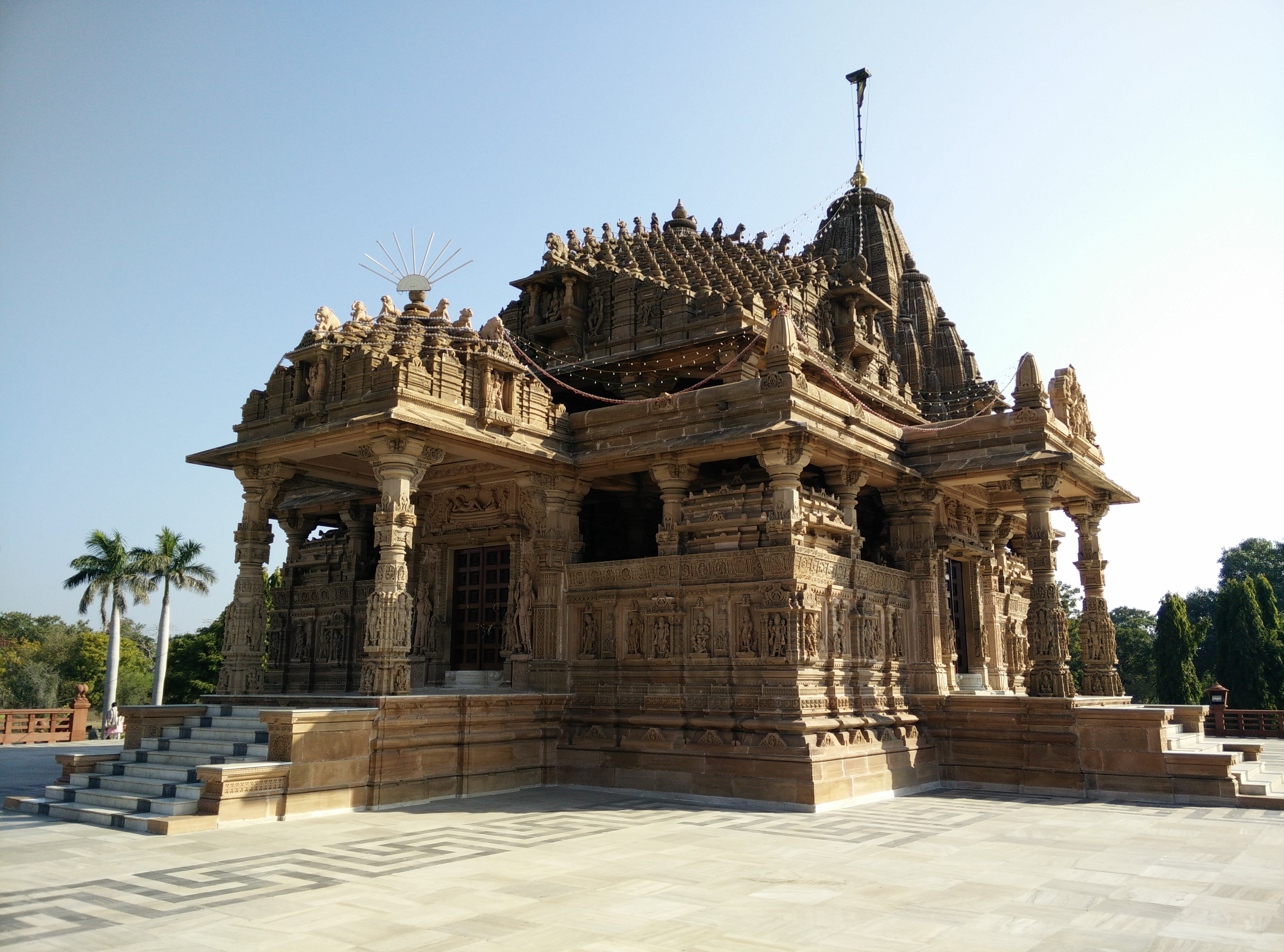
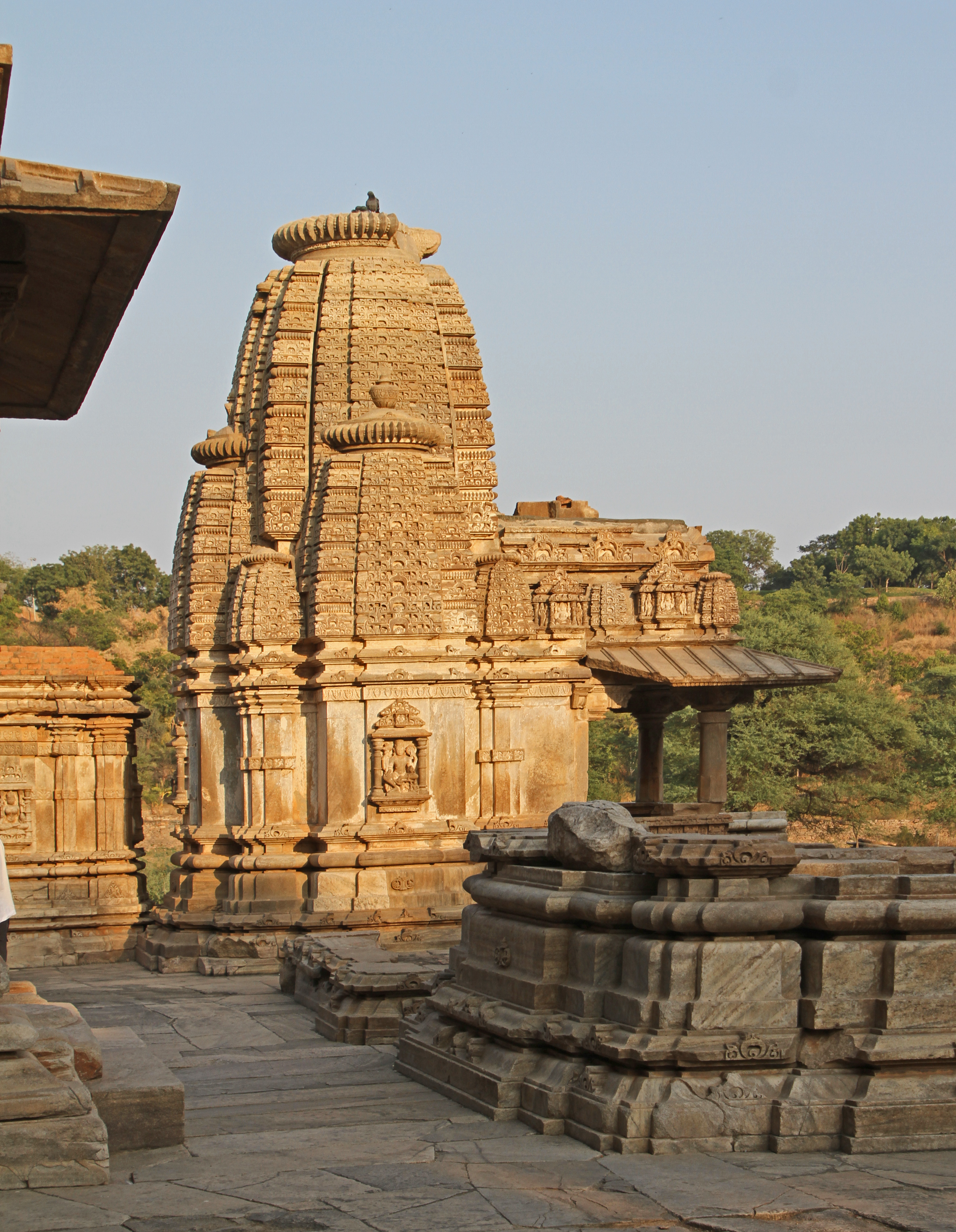
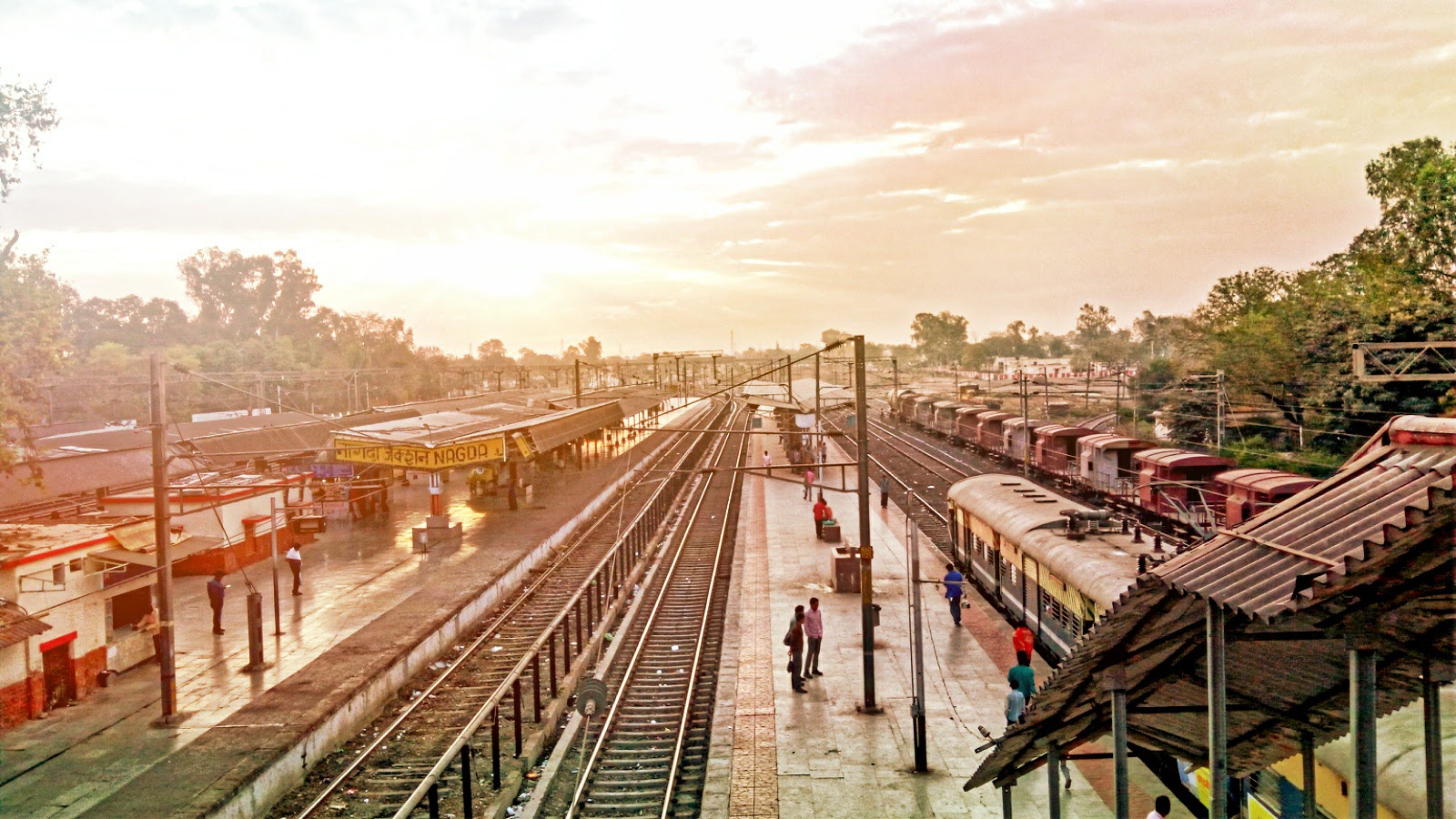
- Nagda Junction, Nagda Temple

- Location in Madhya Pradesh, India
- Coordinates: 23.45°N 75.42°E
- Country: India
- State: Madhya Pradesh
- Region: Indore Metropolitan Region
- District: Ujjain

Population (2026)
  - Total: 307,053 (Urban 48.2%(148,000) Rural 51.2% (159,053)

Languages
  - Official: Hindi
- Time zone: UTC+5:30 (IST)
- Vehicle registration: MP 13

Nagda (Hindi pronunciation: [n̪aːgd̪aː]) is an industrial City in Ujjain district under Indore Metropolitan Region of the Indian state of Madhya Pradesh. It lies in the administrative headquarters of the city of Ujjain, in the Malwa region of western Madhya Pradesh. It is situated on the bank of the Chambal River.

Presently, Nagda is a major industrial city with a manufacturing unit of Viscose Fibre, a Thermal Power Plant, and a Chemical Plant. Nagda is a major ISO granted Railway Junction on the Delhi–Mumbai railway line. The town is exactly 694 km from both Delhi and Mumbai.

Before Nagda was an industrial town, its location near the Chambal with ample land available, along with its location between two of India's biggest markets (Delhi and Mumbai) attracted Ghanshyam Das Birla to set up a major facility. Today Grasim's industrial unit at Nagda is the largest manufacturer of Viscose staple fibre in Asia and coloured fibre in the world.

== Etymology ==
The name of the town was actually nag-dah which means cremation/burning (dah) of snakes (nag).Which was done by raja Janamejaya after his father Parikshit was bitten to death by the snake Takshak The ancient city was developed by King Janamejaya. Janamejaya was a Hindu Kuru Dynasty. Nagda was mentioned in the literature of Kalidasa.

== Demographics ==
Religions in Nagda
Hinduism	81.68%
Islam	14.58%
Christianity	0.81%
Jainism	2.09%
Buddhism	0.53%
Sikhism	0.53%
No particular religion♦	0.29%
Distribution of religions ♦Includes Other religions (0.00%).

As per provisional reports of 2011 India census, population of Nagda in 2011 is 100,039; of which male and female are 51,373 and 48,666 respectively.

The number of literates in Nagda are 71,472, out of which 40,073 are male and 31,399 are female. Nagda has an average literacy rate of 80.71%, above than the national average of 74.04%: male literacy is 88.43%, and female literacy is 72.62%. In Nagda, 11.48% of the population is under 5 to 6 years of age.

According to the 2011 census data, Hinduism is the majority religion in Nagda city with 81.68% followers. Islam is the second most popular religion in the city of Nagda with approximately 14.58% following it. In Nagda city, Christianity is followed by 0.81%, Jainism by 2.09%, Sikhism by 0.53%, and Buddhism by 0.53%. Around 0.00% stated 'Other Religion' and approximately 0.29% stated 'No Particular Religion'.

== Culture ==
The culture of Nagda encompasses both the traditional Malwa culture and a modern, progressive attitude. People celebrate typical Indian festivals like Diwali, Dussehra, Navratri, Holi, Eid al-Fitr, Eid al-Adha, Mahavir Jayanti, Hanuman Jayanti, Ram Navmi, Sharad Purnima, Janmashtami, and Christmas. Apart from these festivals, the city celebrates "Dhol Gyaras" (a dolor dhol is a musical instrument like drum and guards means Ekadasi, a date in Hindu calendar), a one-night event in which mobile temples, called झान्की (jhanki) in the local language, run in the city. The same celebration is held three days later on Anant Chaturdashi at many nearby places like Ujjain and Indore and also in Birlagram, Nagda. The set of pehalwans from different Akhara show their bravery in front of these mobile temples. Various man-made craft items are displayed in shops specially built for this night. Dhol artists play their drums in continuous rhythms. The festival culminates in a carnival-like procession.

== Recreational areas ==
Nagda is known for Atal Park located at the housing board colony, Nagda junction. It has a swimming pool, play zones, and green zones. Birla House garden located at Ponds colony, Nagda junction. It's a huge garden accessible to only residents of the Birla gram colony. Nayan dam is also located in Nagda junction and is known for its scenery. Shivratri fair is also held in Nagda. People from nearby villages come to Nagda to have fun with their friends and family.

- Birla temple is located in Nagda junction. This Hindu temple is built by the Birla family. It is a Vishnu Mandir (also known as Birla Mandir) that has a carved image of Gods and Goddess on the columns, walls, roof, and beams.
- Chamunda Mata Temple is a major religious and tourist destination located on the banks of Chambal River in Nagda. Thousands of people come here to have darshan of Mother Goddess, due to being situated on the river bank, this temple gets submerged in the river during the rains.

== Government and politics ==
Nagda has Nagar Palika Parishad, which runs by 36 wards members and 1 city Mayor. The city has ample funds for development which has brought a lot of changes in the city.

Currently, Dr. Tejbahadur Singh Chauhan is the elected Member of the Legislative Assembly for the term 2023 to 2028, representing the Bhartiya Janata Party.

== Religion ==
Hinduism is the dominant religion in Nagda with 81.68% followers as of 2011, followed by Islam with 14.58%, Christianity with 0.81%, Sikhism with 0.53%, Buddhism with 0.53%, and Jainism with 2.09%. Many temples & Masjids, Catholic churches, Protestant Church, Guru Dwaras, Ayyappa Temple, and other religious buildings are found throughout the city. The most prominent communities include Rajpoot, Gurjar, Brahmin, Marwaris, Viswakarma, Marwari Jains, Porwals, and Chauhans along with the local communities. The most prominent Hindu temple in Nagda is Birla Mandir with its characteristic artwork carved on walls and pillars surrounded by a garden and fountain, dedicated to Lord Vishnu which was built by the Birla family.

== Food and cuisines ==
Nagda has a variety of foods and cuisines. The city starts its day with tea, poha, jalebi, samosa, and kachori. The Ratlami Sev is a common snack often served with a meal and dinner. Dal-Baati-Churma is the food of the Malwa. It is commonly served at all festivities, including religious occasions, wedding ceremonies, and parties. "Dal-Baati", is a combination of two different food items - Dal (lentils), Baati. It is a typical Malwa dish. Dal is made of lentils and can be a little spicy. Baati baked or a grilled ball of wheat flour dough. Churma is made with small flaky pieces of Baati, ghee and sugar & is eaten like a dessert. Also Reveri is also famous dessert.

== Education ==
Yash Public Senior Secondary School (YPSSS), founded in 1997, is a K-12 co-educational CBSE school located in Nagda.

Fatima Convent Higher Secondary School (FCHSS) is located at Nagda Ujjain. It is the only ICSE affiliated school in the town. Owned by the Diocese of Ujjain. The school was established in 1970.

The Aditya Birla Public School, Nagda was established as Grasim Vidya Mandir on 13 July 1970, under the aegis of Grasim Industries Ltd. The school was set up by Ghanshyam Dasji Birla to fulfill the need for quality education for the children of Grasim employees and the surrounding locality. The school is located at Nagda, (Ujjain district, M.P.) on the Delhi – Mumbai Train route.

Aditya Birla Higher Secondary School [formerly known as Grasim Vidyalaya] is the Heritage School. It was established in 1953. Initially, the school was started in a small building with 58 students and 6 teachers. Today it has 2265 students and 87 teachers.

Agoshdeep International Public school was established on 12 January 2005. It is now closed.

=== Higher education ===
Most colleges in Nagda are affiliated with Vikram University. The city's most prominent college is Nagda Government College near Rupeta village. Other colleges are Shesh Shai college and Vardhaman college.

== Transportation ==
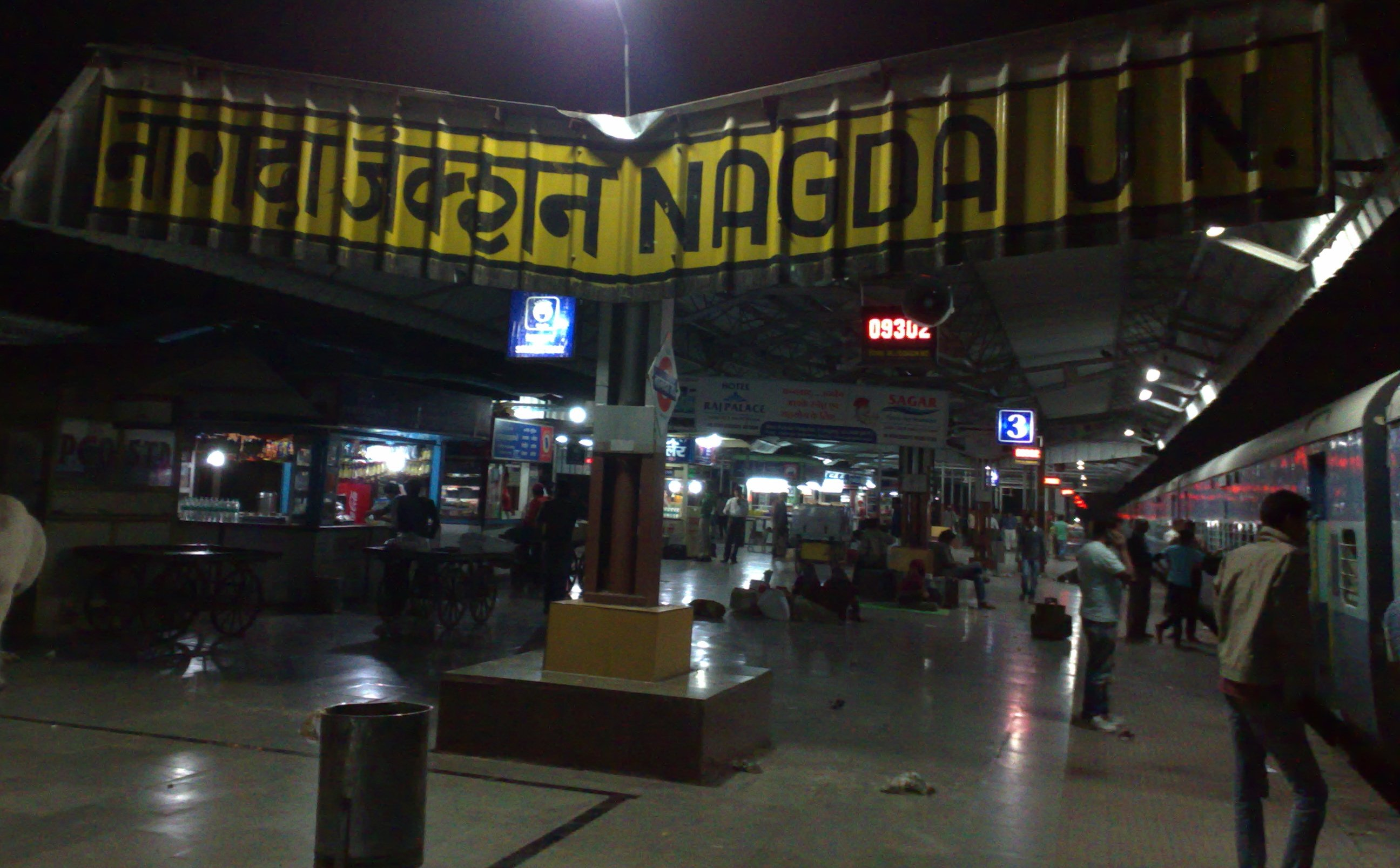
Nagda Station at Night

Currently, there is no public transport like AICTSL OR BRTS. Auto rickshaws are available for small distance travel.

=== Rail ===
Nagda is situated in the basin of river Chambal. It is an important junction station of Western Railways, which connect the Delhi-Mumbai mainline with Bhopal. It is an important halt for all trains that are bound for Jaipur, Mumbai, Delhi & Bhopal. The main lines passing through Nagda Junction are : Mumbai- New Delhi line via Kota Junction ( broad gauge line).

=== Air ===
Devi Ahilya Bai Holkar International Airport, The nearest airport is located in Indore about 110 km from the city.

=== Road ===
Nagda has connectivity with SH-17
