= Chittaurgarh Junction railway station =

Railway station in Rajasthan, India

Chittaurgarh Junction
- Indian Railways logo

General information
- Location: Railway Colony, Chittorgarh, Rajasthan; India
- Coordinates: 24.88°N 74.63°E
- Elevation: 403 metres (1,322 ft)
- System: Regional rail and Light rail station
- Owner: Indian Railways
- Operator: Western Railways
- Lines: Ajmer–Ratlam section, Chittaurgarh–Udaipur section, Kota–Bundi–Chittaurgarh line
- Platforms: 7
- Tracks: 10
- Connections: Taxi stand, auto stand

Construction
- Parking: Yes
- Cycle facilities: Yes
- Accessible: Available

Other information
- Status: Functional
- Station code: COR
- Zone(s): Western Railway zone
- Division(s): Ratlam

History
- Opened: 1881; 145 years ago
Location
- Location within Rajasthan Location within India

Chittaurgarh Junction railway station (station code: COR) is one of the major railway junctions in Southern Rajasthan, India. The railway station of Chittorgarh is located on a broad-gauge line and falls under the administrative control of Western Railway Zone of Indian Railways and consists of seven main railway platforms.

Chittaurgarh Junction is connected by rail with Jaipur via Bhilwara, Ajmer–Kishangarh, Kota via Bundi, Jodhpur via Ajmer, Indore Junction BG, Bhopal, Indore Mhow, Ujjain, Ratlam, Nagda Junction, Ajmer and Hazrat Nizamuddin, Bandra Terminus, Mysuru, New Jalpaiguri by many broad gauge trains. The city is also connected to Udaipur City via Mavli Jn. Some weekly trains to Hyderabad, Kolkata, Bangalore, Pune, Agra, Mathura, Kanpur, Rameshwaram, Patliputra pass through this station.

== History ==
=== Rajputana Malwa Railway ===
The Rajputana–Malwa railway was about 720 miles (1,160 km) long and was one of the oldest and most important tracks when India became independent. It started from Ahmadabad, ran into the Rajputana near Abu Road facing south-west, and then ran north-east to Bandikui, where one branch led to Agra and another to Delhi. It also had branches from Ajmer south to Nimach via Chittorgarh and from Phulera north-east to Rewari.

The line was constructed between 1874 and 1881 exceptThe the chord last mentioned, which was a later extension. The Indian government assigned the Bombay, Baroda and Central India Railway Company (BB&CI) to work on the line since 1885. Before 1882, the Rajputana–Malwa Railway was known as the Rajputana State Railway. It was a metre-gauge (1,000 mm or 3 ft 3 3/8 in) railway line which ran from Delhi to Indore Junction and to Ahmedabad via Chittorgarh. It was opened on 18 August 1876.

The railway was renamed Rajputana–Malwa Railway when a new line from Ajmer to Khandwa via Chittorgarh, Ujjain and Mhow was added to it. On 9 March 1885, Jodhpur was connected to this network from Marwar Junction with metre-gauge track and later became part of the Jodhpur–Bikaner Railway.

The station is close to Fern hotels and resorts.

=== Udaipur–Chittaurgarh Railway ===
Udaipur–Chitor link, a portion of the Bina–Guna–Baran, was named after the towns it connects. It was the property of the Udaipur Durbar. The railway was 67 miles (108 km) long and was constructed between 1895 and 1899. It began operation in 1898. The capital expenditure was nearly 21 lakhs up to the end of 1904. The net profits averaged about 5 per cent.

=== Western Railway ===
==== The past ====
The rail link of Ratlam Division has a history of more than 130 years. The metre-gauge section was started in 1874, while the broad gauge (1,676 mm or 5 ft 6 in) came into existence in 1893. It is a major junction and a rail division of Indian Railways on metre- and broad-gauge lines. Four major railway tracks pass through Ratlam City; these are towards Mumbai, Delhi, Ajmer and Khandwa, in which the railway track along Khandwa is a metre-gauge track.

Neemuch–Nasirabad railway construction planning was made for joining Rajputana railway and Nasirabad Scindia railway to Neemuch. Although the survey of Neemuch–Nasirabad railway was carried out in 1871–72, construction started in 1879, and the work completed in March 1881.

==== The present ====
The broad gauge portion extends from Godhra to Bhopal, Ujjain to Indore and Ratlam to Chanderia via Chittaurgarh Junction. The metre gauge portion of the division extends from Ujjain to Khandwa. Mr. Mukesh Kumar Meena is currently the station superintendent of the chittaurgarh railway station.

== Track gauge ==
The Chittaurgarh Junction track gauge is 1,676 mm (5 ft 6 in) broad gauge (BG). The broad-gauge network is used for the Superfast Express trains in India and fast passenger trains.

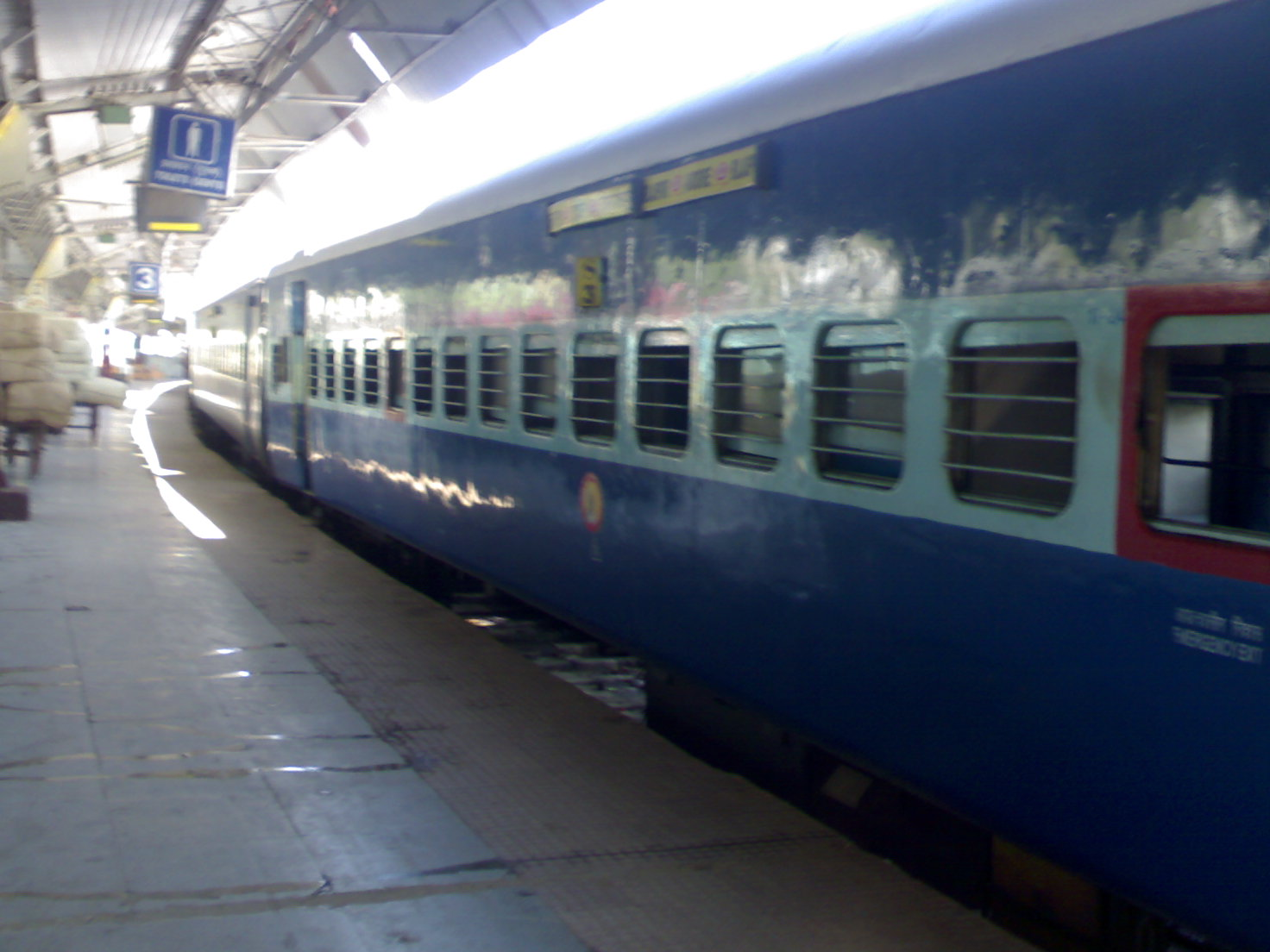
11203 Nagpur–Jaipur Express at Indore Junction

== Suburban stations of Chittorgarh ==
The city of Chittorgarh has seven other railway stations:

Station name	Station code	Railway zone	Total platforms
Chittaurgarh Junction	COR	Western Railway	5
Chanderiya	CNA	Western Railway	3
Ordi	ORDI	Western Railway	2
Det	DET	North Western Railway	2
Ghosunda	GSD	North Western Railway	1
Gangrar	GGR	North Western Railway	1
Bassi	BAS	West Central Railway	1
