= Udaipur City–Asarva (Ahmedabad) Intercity Superfast Express =

Train in India

Udaipur City - Asarva (Ahmedabad) Intercity Superfast Express

Overview
- Service type: Superfast
- Status: Active
- Locale: Rajasthan and Gujarat
- First service: 1 January 2025; 20 months ago
- Current operator: North Western Railway (NWR)

Route
- Termini: Udaipur City (UDZ); Asarva (ASV)
- Stops: 16
- Distance travelled: 296 km (184 mi)
- Average journey time: 5h 25m
- Service frequency: Daily
- Train number: 20987 / 20988

On-board services
- Classes: General Unreserved, Sleeper Class, AC 3 Tier, AC Chair Car
- Seating arrangements: Yes
- Sleeping arrangements: Yes
- Catering facilities: No
- Baggage facilities: No

Technical
- Rolling stock: LHB coach
- Track gauge: 1,676 mm (5 ft 6 in)
- Electrification: 25 kV 50 Hz AC Overhead line
- Operating speed: 110 km/h (68 mph) maximum, 55 km/h (34 mph) average including halts.
- Track owner: Indian Railways

The 20987 / 20988 Udaipur City–Asarva (Ahmedabad) Intercity Superfast Express is an Superfast Express train belonging to North Western Railway zone that runs between Udaipur City and Asarva (Ahmedabad) in India.

== Schedule ==
- 20987 - 4:05 PM (Daily) [Udaipur City]
- 20988 - 6:50 AM (Daily) [Asarva]

== Routes and halts ==
The Important Halts of the train are :

● Udaipur City

● Umra

● Zawar

● Jai Samand Road

● Semari

● Rikhabdev Road

● Dungarpur

● Bechhiwara

● Shamlaji Road

● Himmatnagar Junction

● Prantij

● Talod

● Nandol Dahegam

● Naroda

● Sardargram

● Asarva

== Traction ==
As the entire route is fully electrified it is hauled by a Bhagat Ki Kothi Loco Shed-based WAP 7 electric locomotive from Udaipur City to Asarva and vice versa.

== Rake reversal or rake share ==
The train will Rake Sharing with Jaipur–Udaipur City Superfast Express (20993/20994).

== See also ==
Trains from Udaipur City :

1. Udaipur City–Agra Cantonment Vande Bharat Express
2. Udaipur City–New Jalpaiguri Weekly Express
3. Ahmedabad–Udaipur Express
4. Udaipur City–Mysuru Palace Queen Humsafar Express
5. Ananya Express

Trains from Asarva :

1. Asarva (Ahmedabad)–Agra Cantonment Superfast Express
2. Veer Bhumi Chittaurgarh Express

== Notes ==
a. Runs daily in a week with both directions.
