= Asarva (Ahmedabad)–Agra Cantonment Superfast Express =

Train in India

Asarva (Ahmedabad) - Agra Cantt Superfast Express
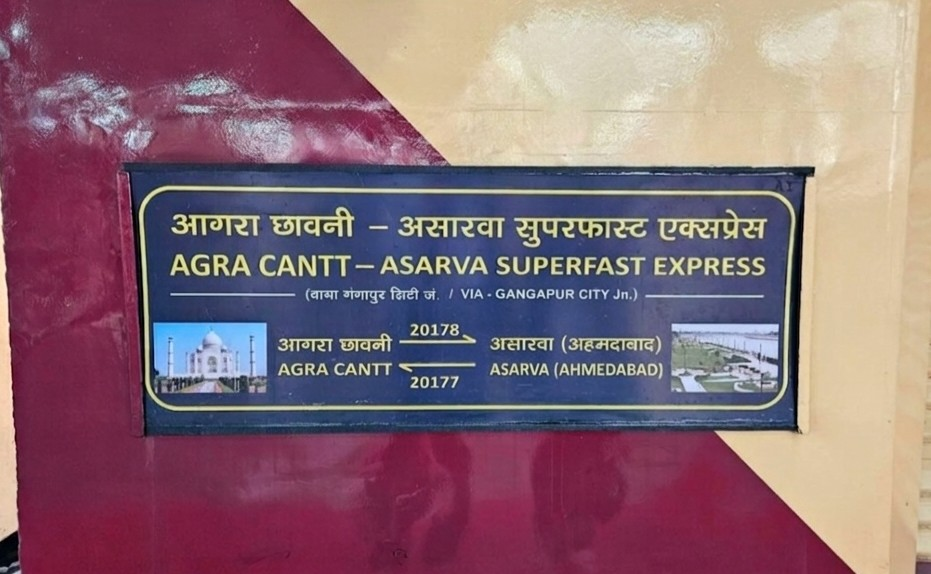

Overview
- Service type: Superfast
- Status: Active
- Locale: Gujarat, Rajasthan & Uttar Pradesh
- First service: 9 April 2026; 21 days ago
- Current operator: North Central Railway (NCR)

Route
- Termini: Asarva (ASV); Agra Cantonment (AGC)
- Stops: 15
- Distance travelled: 892 km (554 mi)
- Average journey time: 16h 15m
- Service frequency: 5 days
- Train number: 20177 / 20178

On-board services
- Classes: AC 2 tier, AC 3 tier, Sleeper class, General Unreserved
- Seating arrangements: Yes
- Sleeping arrangements: Yes
- Catering facilities: On-board Catering, E-catering
- Observation facilities: Large windows
- Baggage facilities: No
- Other facilities: Below the seats

Technical
- Rolling stock: LHB coach
- Track gauge: 1,676 mm (5 ft 6 in)
- Operating speed: 57 km/h (35 mph) average including halts.

The 20177 / 20178 Asarva (Ahmedabad)–Agra Cantt Superfast Express is a Superfast Express train belonging to North Central Railway zone that runs between Asarva (Ahmedabad) and Agra Cantt in India.

== Schedule ==
• 20177 - 3:00 PM (Sunday, Monday, Thursday, Friday & Saturday) [Asarva]

• 20178 - 6:45 PM (Sunday, Wednesday, Thursday, Friday & Saturday) [Agra Cantt]

== Routes and halts ==
The Important Halts of the train are :

● Asarva

● Himmatnagar Junction

● Shamlaji Road

● Dungarpur

● Zawar

● Udaipur City

● Rana Pratap Nagar

● Mavli Junction

● Chanderiya

● Mandalgarh

● Bundi

● Keshoraipatan

● Sawai Madhopur Junction

● Gangapur City Junction

● Agra Cantt

== Traction ==
As the entire route is fully electrified it is hauled by a Jhansi Loco Shed-based WAP-4 electric locomotive from Asarva (Ahmedabad) to Agra Cantonment and vice versa.

== Rake share ==
No rake share.

== See also ==
Trains from Asarva :

1. Udaipur City–Asarva (Ahmedabad) Vande Bharat Express
2. Veer Bhumi Chittaurgarh Express
3. Udaipur City–Asarva (Ahmedabad) Intercity Superfast Express

Trains from Agra Cantonment :

1. Agra Cantonment–Banaras Vande Bharat Express
2. Agra Cantt–New Delhi Intercity Express
3. Lashkar Express
4. Kolkata–Agra Cantonment Express
5. Agra Cantt–Sabarmati Superfast Express

== Notes ==
a. Runs 5 days in a week with both directions.
