= Shalashah Thana railway station =

Railway station in Rajasthan, India

General information
- Location: Thana, Dungarpur district, Rajasthan; India
- Coordinates: 23.836427°N 73.65218°E
- System: Indian Railways
- Owner: Indian Railways
- Operator: North Western Railway
- Line: Ahmedabad–Udaipur line
- Platforms: 1
- Tracks: 1

Construction
- Structure type: Standard (on-ground station)
- Parking: Yes

Other information
- Status: Functioning
- Station code: SHLT
- Zone(s): North Western Railway
- Division(s): Ajmer

History
- Opened: 1879

Services
Preceding station	Indian Railways	Following station
Shri Bhavnath towards ?	North Western Railway zone Ahmedabad–Udaipur Line	Dungarpur towards ?
Location

Shalashah Thana railway station is a railway station on Ahmedabad–Udaipur Line under the Ajmer railway division of North Western Railway zone. This is situated at Thana in Dungarpur district of the Indian state of Rajasthan.
