= Jagabor railway station =

Railway station in Rajasthan, India

General information
- Location: Jagabor, Bichhiwara Tehsil, Dungarpur district, Rajasthan; India
- Coordinates: 23.739453°N 73.453045°E
- System: Indian Railways
- Owner: Indian Railways
- Operator: North Western Railway
- Line: Ahmedabad–Udaipur line
- Platforms: 1
- Tracks: 1

Construction
- Structure type: Standard (on-ground station)
- Parking: Yes

Other information
- Status: Functioning
- Station code: JO
- Zone(s): North Western Railway
- Division(s): Ajmer

History
- Opened: 1879

Services
Preceding station	Indian Railways	Following station
Lusadiya towards ?	North Western Railway zone Ahmedabad–Udaipur Line	Bechhiwara towards ?
Location

Jagabor railway station is a railway station on Ahmedabad–Udaipur Line under the Ajmer railway division of North Western Railway zone. This is situated at Jagabor, Bichhiwara Tehsil in Dungarpur district of the Indian state of Rajasthan.
