= Kotana railway station =

Railway station in Rajasthan

General information
- Location: Kotana, Pipalada, Dungarpur, Dungarpur district, Rajasthan; India
- Coordinates: 23.91693°N 73.726342°E
- Elevation: 265 metres (869 ft)
- System: Indian Railways
- Owner: Indian Railways
- Operator: North Western Railway
- Line: Ahmedabad–Udaipur line
- Platforms: 1
- Tracks: 1

Construction
- Structure type: Standard (on-ground station)
- Parking: Yes

Other information
- Status: Functioning
- Station code: KTOA
- Zone(s): North Western Railway
- Division(s): Ajmer

History
- Opened: 1879

Services
Preceding station	Indian Railways	Following station
Dungarpur towards ?	North Western Railway zone Ahmedabad–Udaipur Line	Rikhabdev Road towards ?
Location

Kotana railway station is a railway station on Ahmedabad–Udaipur Line under the Ajmer railway division of North Western Railway zone. This is situated at Kotana, Pipalada, Dungarpur in Dungarpur district of the Indian state of Rajasthan.
