= Shri Bhavnath railway station =

Railway station in Rajasthan, India

General information
- Location: Bichhiwara Road, Ora Bara, Dungarpur district, Rajasthan; India
- Coordinates: 23.814591°N 73.5854°E
- System: Indian Railways
- Owner: Indian Railways
- Operator: North Western Railway
- Line: Ahmedabad–Udaipur line
- Platforms: 1
- Tracks: 1

Construction
- Structure type: Standard (on-ground station)
- Parking: Yes

Other information
- Status: Functioning
- Station code: SBHN
- Zone(s): North Western Railway
- Division(s): Ajmer

History
- Opened: 1879

Services
Preceding station	Indian Railways	Following station
Bechhiwara towards ?	North Western Railway zone Ahmedabad–Udaipur Line	Shalashah Thana towards ?
Location

Shri Bhavnath railway station is a railway station on Ahmedabad–Udaipur Line under the Ajmer railway division of North Western Railway zone. This is situated beside Bichhiwara Road at Ora Bara in Dungarpur district of the Indian state of Rajasthan.
