= Umra railway station =

Railway Station in Rajasthan, India

General information
- Location: Opp. RR Dental College and Hospital, Ambua Road, Umarda, Rajasthan; India
- Coordinates: 24.5230305°N 73.7719635°E
- Elevation: 579 metres (1,900 ft)
- System: Indian Railways station
- Owner: Indian Railways
- Operator: North Western Railway
- Line: Ahmedabad–Udaipur line
- Platforms: 3

Construction
- Structure type: Standard (on-ground station)
- Parking: Available

Other information
- Status: Active
- Station code: UMRA
- Zone(s): North Western Railway
- Division(s): Ajmer

Services
Preceding station	Indian Railways	Following station
Kharwa Chanda towards Ahmedabad Junction	Ahmedabad–Udaipur line	Udaipur City Terminus
Location
- Location within India Location within Rajasthan

Umra railway station is a medium-size railway station, located in Udaipur district, Rajasthan, India, besides the main Udaipur City railway station. Its code is UMRA. It serves Umarda village. Along with Udaipur City and Rana Pratap Nagar, it will be developed as the third station of Udaipur city. It is under the administrative control of North Western Railway of Indian Railways.

Umra railway station is part of the Ahmedabad–Udaipur line, which is undergoing gauge conversion, from metre to broad gauge. In May 2019 the section between Himmatnagar Junction and Raigadh Road stations was commissioned (24 km) and in January 2020, Udaipur City – Umra – Kharwa Chanda section (24 km), remaining under gauge conversion Raigadh Road – Kharwa Chanda (163 km).

== See also ==
- Udaipur
- Udaipur Airport
- Udaipur City Bus Depot
