= Jaipur–Udaipur City Superfast Express =

Train in India

Jaipur – Udaipur City Superfast Express

Overview
- Service type: Superfast
- Status: Active
- Locale: Rajasthan
- First service: 15 April 2026; 7 days ago
- Current operator: North Western Railway

Route
- Termini: Jaipur Junction (JP); Udaipur City (UDZ)
- Stops: 13
- Distance travelled: 429 km (267 mi)
- Average journey time: 7h 20m
- Service frequency: Daily
- Train number: 20993 / 20994

On-board services
- Classes: AC 3 Tier, Chair Car, Sleeper Class, General Unreserved
- Seating arrangements: Yes
- Sleeping arrangements: Yes
- Catering facilities: Available
- Observation facilities: Large windows
- Baggage facilities: No
- Other facilities: Below the seats

Technical
- Rolling stock: LHB coach
- Track gauge: 1,676 mm (5 ft 6 in)
- Operating speed: 58 km/h (36 mph) average including halts.

The 20993 / 20994 Jaipur–Udaipur City Superfast Express is a Superfast Express train belonging to North Western Railway zone that runs between Jaipur Junction and Udaipur City in India.

== Schedule ==
- 20993 – 6:10 AM (Daily) [Jaipur Junction]
- 20994 – 3:05 PM (Daily) [Udaipur City]

== Routes and halts ==
The Important halts of the train are:

- Jaipur Junction
- Kanakpura
- Phulera Junction
- Kishangarh
- Ajmer Junction
- Nasirabad
- Bijainagar
- Bhilwara
- Chanderiya
- Kapasan
- Mavli Junction
- Rana Pratap Nagar
- Udaipur City

== Traction ==
As the entire route is fully electrified, it the train is hauled by a Ghaziabad Loco Shed WAP-7 electric locomotive from Jaipur Junction to Udaipur City and vice versa.

== Rake share ==
The train will Rake Sharing with Udaipur City–Asarva (Ahmedabad) Intercity Superfast Express (20987/20988).

== See also ==
Trains from Jaipur Junction :

1. Jaipur–Delhi Sarai Rohilla AC Double Decker Express
2. Leelan Express
3. Coimbatore–Jaipur Superfast Express
4. Jaipur–Agra Fort Shatabdi Express
5. Jaipur–Mysore Superfast Express

Trains from Udaipur City :

1. Khajuraho–Udaipur City Express
2. Udaipur City–Kamakhya Kavi Guru Express
3. Udaipur City–Yog Nagari Rishikesh Express
4. Mewar Express
5. Udaipur City–Mysuru Palace Queen Humsafar Express

== Notes ==
a. Runs daily in a week with both directions.
