= Sahijpur railway station =

Railway station in Gujarat

General information
- Location: Gayatri Society Road, Sahijpur Bogha, Ahmedabad, Gujarat; India
- Coordinates: 23.061366°N 72.631634°E
- Elevation: 58 metres (190 ft)
- System: Passenger train station
- Owner: Indian Railways
- Operator: Western Railway
- Line: Ahmedabad–Udaipur line
- Platforms: 1
- Tracks: 1

Construction
- Structure type: Standard (on-ground station)
- Parking: Yes

Other information
- Status: Functioning
- Station code: SAHP
- Zone(s): Western Railway
- Division(s): Ahmedabad

History
- Opened: 1879

Services
Preceding station	Indian Railways	Following station
Asarva towards ?	Western Railway zone Ahmedabad–Udaipur Line	Sardargram towards ?
Location

Sahijpur railway station is a railway station on Ahmedabad–Udaipur Line under the Ahmedabad railway division of Western Railway zone. This is situated beside Gayatri Society Road at Sahijpur Bogha in Ahmedabad of the Indian state of Gujarat.
