= Lusadiya railway station =

Railway station in Gujarat, India

General information
- Location: Lusadiya, Rampur, Aravalli district, Gujarat; India
- Coordinates: 23.68541°N 73.421111°E
- Elevation: 224 metres (735 ft)
- System: Indian Railways
- Owner: Indian Railways
- Operator: North Western Railway
- Line: Ahmedabad–Udaipur line
- Platforms: 2
- Tracks: 1

Construction
- Structure type: Standard (on-ground station)
- Parking: Yes

Other information
- Status: Functioning
- Station code: LSD
- Zone(s): North Western Railway
- Division(s): Ajmer

History
- Opened: 1879

Services
Preceding station	Indian Railways	Following station
Shamlaji Road towards ?	North Western Railway zone Ahmedabad–Udaipur Line	Jagabor towards ?
Location

Lusadiya railway station is a railway station on Ahmedabad–Udaipur Line under the Ajmer railway division of North Western Railway zone. This is situated at Lusadiya, Rampur in Aravalli district of the Indian state of Gujarat.
