= Kherol railway station =

Railway station in Gujarat

General information
- Location: State Highway 237, Valiyampura, Sabarkantha district, Gujarat; India
- Coordinates: 23.310434°N 72.934133°E
- Elevation: 103 metres (338 ft)
- System: Passenger train station
- Owner: Indian Railways
- Operator: Western Railway
- Line: Ahmedabad–Udaipur line
- Platforms: 1
- Tracks: 1

Construction
- Structure type: Standard (on-ground station)
- Parking: Yes

Other information
- Status: Functioning
- Station code: KOY
- Zone(s): Western Railway
- Division(s): Ahmedabad

History
- Opened: 1879

Services
Preceding station	Indian Railways	Following station
Rakhiyal towards ?	Western Railway zone Ahmedabad–Udaipur Line	Talod towards ?
Location

Kherol railway station is a railway station on Ahmedabad–Udaipur Line under the Ahmedabad railway division of Western Railway zone. This is situated beside State Highway 237 at Valiyampura, Kherol in Sabarkantha district of the Indian state of Gujarat.
