= Medra railway station =

Railway station in Gujarat

General information
- Location: National Highway 8, Valad, Gandhinagar district, Gujarat; India
- Coordinates: 23.13609°N 72.712778°E
- Elevation: 66 metres (217 ft)
- System: Passenger train station
- Owner: Indian Railways
- Operator: Western Railway
- Line: Ahmedabad–Udaipur line
- Platforms: 1
- Tracks: 1

Construction
- Structure type: Standard (on-ground station)
- Parking: Yes

Other information
- Status: Functioning
- Station code: MDRA
- Zone(s): Western Railway
- Division(s): Ahmedabad

History
- Opened: 1879

Services
| Preceding station | Indian Railways | Following station |
|---|---|---|
| Naroda towards ? | Western Railway zone Ahmedabad–Udaipur Line | Dabhoda towards ? |
Location

Medra railway station is a railway station on Ahmedabad–Udaipur Line under the Ahmedabad railway division of Western Railway zone. This is situated beside National Highway 8 at Valad in Gandhinagar district of the Indian state of Gujarat.
