= Dabhoda =

Dabhoda Dabhoda
- Neighbourhood
- Location in Gujarat, India
- Coordinates: 23.175600°N 72.747704°E
- Country: India
- State: Gujarat
- District: Gandhinagar

Government
  - Body: Gandhinagar

Languages
  - Official: Gujarati, Hindi
- Time zone: UTC+5:30 (IST)
- PIN: 382355
- Telephone code: 91-079
- Lok Sabha constituency: Gandhinagar
- Civic agency: Gandhinagar
- Website: www.dabhoda.com

Dabhoda is an area located in Gandhinagar, India. It is near to the under construction GIFT City.

== Transport ==
Dabhoda railway station is the main railway station of Dabhoda. This is situated on Ahmedabad–Udaipur Line under the Ahmedabad railway division of Western Railway zone.
