= Bheeloora =

- Village
- Country: India
- State: Rajasthan
- District: Dungarpur
- Tehsil: Sagwara

Population (2001)
  - Total: 6,691

Languages
  - Official: Hindi
- Time zone: UTC+5:30 (IST)
- PIN: 314031
- Telephone code: 02966
- ISO 3166 code: RJ-IN
- Vehicle registration: RJ-12

Bheeloora is a panchayat village in Rajasthan in western India. Administratively it is under Sagwara Tehsil of Dungarpur district, Rajasthan.

== Education level ==
Bheeloora has around 8-10 schools including a main Government Senior Secondary school, Government middle school, Gurukul secondary public school and other 5-6 private schools, etc. Around 80% of Bheeloora's population is educated in which half of them have graduate level education. A few people have higher-level education including Doctor, CA, Engineer, Lawyer, Computer Engg, Policemen etc. Bheeloora Senior school has a record 100% result for five consecutive years in Science stream.

== Demographics ==
As of the 2011 census there were 1,375 families living in Bheeloora village.

== Religion ==
The village has Hindu and Muslim families.
