= Surat – Udaipur City Vande Bharat Express =

Defunct Mini Vande Bharat Express train route in India

Overview
- Service type: Vande Bharat Express
- Locale: Gujarat and Rajasthan
- Current operator: Western Railways (WR)

Route
- Termini: Surat (ST); Udaipur City (UDZ)
- Stops: 09
- Distance travelled: 530 km (329 mi)
- Average journey time: 07 hrs 30 mins
- Service frequency: Six days a week (Note: Except Tuesdays)
- Train number: 26903 / 26904
- Line used: Surat–Ahemdabad line Ahmedabad–Udaipur line

On-board services
- Classes: AC Chair Car, AC Executive Chair Car
- Seating arrangements: Airline style; Rotatable seats
- Sleeping arrangements: No
- Catering facilities: Onboard catering
- Observation facilities: Large windows in all coaches
- Entertainment facilities: On-board WiFi; Infotainment system; Electric outlets; Reading light; Seat pockets; Bottle holder; Tray table
- Baggage facilities: Overhead racks
- Other facilities: Kavach

Technical
- Rolling stock: Mini Vande Bharat 2.0
- Track gauge: Indian gauge
- Electrification: 25 kV 50 Hz AC overhead line
- Operating speed: 71 km/h (44 mph) (Avg)
- Average length: 192 metres (630 ft) (08 coaches)
- Track owner: Indian Railways
- Rake maintenance: Surat (ST)

The 26903/26904 Surat – Udaipur City Vande Bharat Express was India's 81st Vande Bharat Express train, which connected Surat, Gujarat and Udaipur, Rajasthan. The train was initially supposed to run to Asarva (Ahemdabad) with train no.(26963/26964). Later on 2 October 2026, it was extended upto Surat. The commercial services will start from 3 October 2026.

== Overview ==
The train is operated by Indian Railways, which connected Surat and Udaipur City. It is operated with train numbers 26903/26904 on 6 days a week basis. train was flag off by Union Minister C.R.Patil at Surat Railway Station.

== Stop ==
- Surat
- Bharuch
- Vadodara
- Anand
- Maninagar
- Asarva
- Himmatnagar
- Shamlaji Road
- Dungarpur
- Zawar
- Udaipur City

== Rakes ==
It was a 2nd Generation and Mini Vande Bharat 2.0 Express train which was designed and manufactured by the Integral Coach Factory at Perambur, Chennai under the Make in India Initiative.

== Service ==
The 26903/26904 Surat – Udaipur City Vande Bharat Express operated 6 days a week, which coveres a distance of 530 km (329 mi) in a travel time of 07hrs 50mins with an average speed of 70 km/h. The Maximum Permissible Speed (MPS) is 110 km/h (68 mph), while the MPS between Surat and Ahmedabad is 130km/h.

== See also ==
- Vande Bharat Express
- Tejas Express
- Gatiman Express
- Surat railway station
- Udaipur City railway station
- Asarva railway station
