= Kharwa Chanda railway station =

Railway Station in Rajasthan, India

General information
- Location: Kharwa, Udaipur district, Rajasthan; India
- Coordinates: 24.4240°N 73.8048°E
- Elevation: 463 metres (1,519 ft)
- System: Indian Railways station
- Owner: Indian Railways
- Operator: North Western Railway
- Line: Ahmedabad–Udaipur line

Construction
- Structure type: Standard (on ground station)

Other information
- Status: Functioning
- Station code: KRCD
- Zone(s): North Western Railway
- Division(s): Ajmer

Services
Preceding station	Indian Railways	Following station
Zawar towards Ahmedabad Junction	Ahmedabad–Udaipur line	Umra towards Udaipur City
Location
- Location within India Location within Rajasthan

Kharwa Chanda railway station is a railway station in Udaipur district, Rajasthan. Its code is KRCD. It serves the villages of Kharwa and Keora Khurd.

Kharwa Chanda railway station is part of the Ahmedabad–Udaipur line, which is undergoing gauge conversion, from metre to broad gauge. The station is located on a new alignment of the line, 1.2 km northeast from its former position. In May 2019 the section between Himmatnagar Junction and Raigadh Road stations was commissioned (24 km) and in January 2020, Udaipur City – Kharwa Chanda section (24 km), remaining under gauge conversion Raigadh Road – Kharwa Chanda (163 km).
