= Raigadh Road railway station =

Railway Station in Gujarat, India

- Indian Railway Stations logo

General information
- Location: Himatnagar, Sabarkantha district, Gujarat; India
- Coordinates: 23.597183°N 73.184024°E
- Elevation: 168 metres (551 ft)
- System: Indian Railways station
- Owner: Indian Railways
- Operator: North Western Railway
- Line: Ahmedabad–Udaipur line
- Platforms: 2
- Tracks: 2

Construction
- Structure type: Standard (on ground station)

Other information
- Status: Active
- Station code: RGQ
- Zone(s): North Western Railway
- Division(s): Ajmer

Services
Preceding station	Indian Railways	Following station
Viravada towards Ahmedabad Junction	Ahmedabad–Udaipur line	Shamlaji Road towards Udaipur City
Location
- Location within India Location within Gujarat

Raigadh Road railway station is a small railway station in Sabarkantha district, Gujarat. Its code is RGQ. It serves Raigadh village. The station consists of two platforms, which are not well sheltered. It lacks many facilities including water and sanitation.

Raigadh Road railway station is part of the Ahmedabad–Udaipur line. It is undergoing gauge conversion, from metre to broad gauge. In May 2019 the section between Himmatnagar and Raigadh stations was commissioned (24 km) and in January 2020, Udaipur – Kharwa Chanda section (24 km), remaining under gauge conversion Raigadh–Kharwa Chanda (163 km).
