= Shankarlal Decha =

Indian politician

Shankarlal Decha (born 2 July 1964) is an Indian politician from Rajasthan. He is a member of the Rajasthan Legislative Assembly from Sagwara Assembly constituency, which is reserved for Scheduled Tribe community, in Dungarpur district. He won the 2023 Rajasthan Legislative Assembly election representing the Bharatiya Janata Party.

== Early life and education ==
Decha is from Sagwara, Dungarpur district, Rajasthan. He is the son of Savji. He married Ganga in 1984. He studied Class 10 through National Institute of Open Schooling, Noida and passed his examinations in 2016. He discontinued his studies later on. He is a businessman.

== Career ==
Decha won from Sagwara Assembly constituency representing the Bharatiya Janata Party in the 2023 Rajasthan Legislative Assembly election. He polled 75,175 votes and defeated his nearest rival, Mohanlal Roat of the Bharat Adivasi Party, by a margin of 11999 votes.
