= Bechhiwara railway station =

Railway station in Rajasthan, India

General information
- Location: National Highway 8, Bichhiwara, Dungarpur district, Rajasthan; India
- Coordinates: 23.787792°N 73.535256°E
- System: Indian Railways
- Owner: Indian Railways
- Operator: North Western Railway
- Line: Ahmedabad–Udaipur line
- Platforms: 2
- Tracks: 1

Construction
- Structure type: Standard (on-ground station)
- Parking: Yes

Other information
- Status: Functioning
- Station code: BHWA
- Zone(s): North Western Railway
- Division(s): Ajmer

History
- Opened: 1879

Services
| Preceding station | Indian Railways | Following station |
|---|---|---|
| Jagabor towards ? | North Western Railway zone Ahmedabad–Udaipur Line | Shri Bhavnath towards ? |
Location

Bechhiwara railway station is a railway station on Ahmedabad–Udaipur Line under the Ajmer railway division of North Western Railway zone. This is situated beside National Highway 8 at Bichhiwara in Dungarpur district of the Indian state of Rajasthan.
