= Prantij railway station =

Railway station in Gujarat, India

General information
- Location: Prantij, Sabarkantha district, Gujarat; India
- Coordinates: 23.439324°N 72.862688°E
- Elevation: 116 metres (381 ft)
- System: Passenger train station
- Owner: Indian Railways
- Operator: Western Railway
- Line: Ahmedabad–Udaipur line
- Platforms: 2
- Tracks: 1

Construction
- Structure type: Standard (on-ground station)
- Parking: Yes

Other information
- Status: Functioning
- Station code: PRJ
- Zone(s): Western Railway
- Division(s): Ahmedabad

History
- Opened: 1879

Services
Preceding station	Indian Railways	Following station
Khari Amrapur towards ?	Western Railway zone Ahmedabad–Udaipur Line	Sonasan towards ?
Location

Prantij railway station is a railway station on Ahmedabad–Udaipur Line under the Ahmedabad railway division of Western Railway zone. This is situated at Prantij in Sabarkantha district of the Indian state of Gujarat.
