= Udaipur City–Delhi Sarai Rohilla Rajasthan Humsafar Express =

Indian Railway Service

Udaipur City - Delhi Sarai Rohilla Rajasthan Humsafar Express
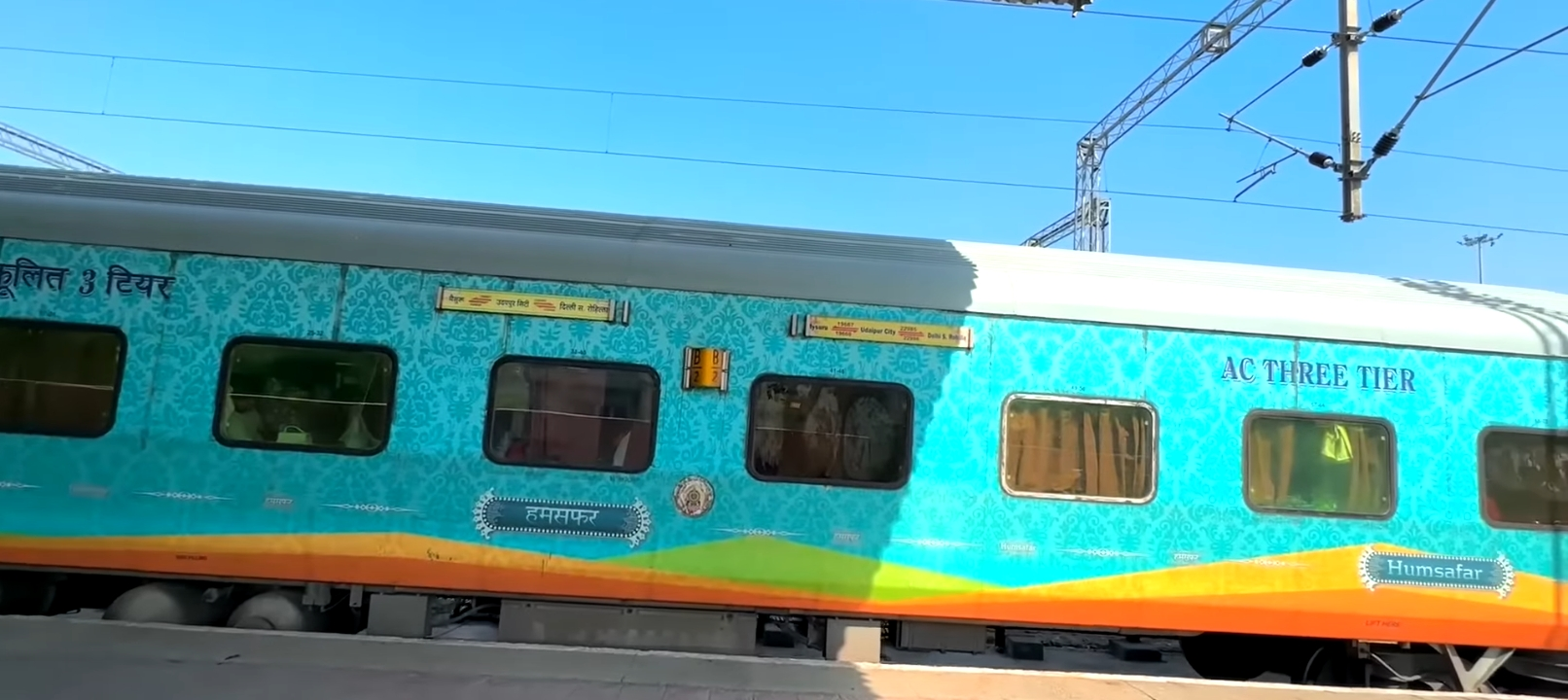
- Udaipur City - Delhi Sarai Rohilla Rajasthan Humsafar Express At Rewari Junction railway station

Overview
- Service type: Humsafar Express
- First service: 24 February 2018; 8 years ago (Inaugural service)
- Current operator: North Western Railways

Route
- Termini: Udaipur City (UDZ); Delhi Sarai Rohilla (DEE)
- Stops: 8
- Distance travelled: 732 km (455 mi)
- Average journey time: 12 hours 45 mins
- Service frequency: Weekly (Note: Runs once in a week for every direction.)
- Train number: 22985 / 22986

On-board services
- Class: AC 3 tier
- Seating arrangements: No
- Sleeping arrangements: Yes
- Catering facilities: Available
- Observation facilities: Large windows
- Entertainment facilities: Yes

Technical
- Rolling stock: LHB Humsafar
- Track gauge: 1,676 mm (5 ft 6 in)
- Operating speed: 62 km/h (39 mph)

The 22985/22986 Udaipur City - Delhi Sarai Rohilla Rajasthan Humsafar Express is an express train operated by Indian Railways connecting Udaipur city railway station in Rajasthan and Delhi Sarai Rohilla railway station in Delhi. It is operated with 22985/22986 train numbers on a weekly basis.

The line was inaugurated on 24 February 2018

== Coach composition ==
The train is completely 3-tier AC sleeper designed by Indian Railways with features of LED screen display to show information about stations, train speed etc. and will have announcement system as well, Vending machines for tea, coffee and milk, Bio toilets in compartments as well as CCTV cameras.

== Route and halts ==
- Udaipur City
- Mavli Junction
- Chanderiya
- Bhilwara
- Ajmer Junction
- Jaipur Junction
- Alwar Junction
- Delhi Sarai Rohilla

== Traction ==
earlier was WDP-4B and WDM-3D. It is hauled by a Ghaziabad Loco Shed based WAP-7 electric locomotive on its entire journey.

== Timing ==
22986 - leaves Delhi Sarai Rohilla every Sunday at 4:20 PM IST

        Alwar - 6:42 PM IST

        Jaipur - 9:05 PM IST

        Ajmer Junction - 11:25 PM IST

        Bhilwara - Night 1:23 AM IST

        CHANDERIYA  - night 2:38 AM IST

        Mavli Jn - Morning 3:36 AM IST

        Udaipur City - Morning 4:55 AM IST

22987 - Leaves Udaipur City every Saturday at 11:10 PM IST

         Mavli Jn - night 12:08 AM IST

         CHANDERIYA  - night 1:35 AM IST

         Bhilwara - Night 2:13 AM IST

         Ajmer Junction - Morning 4:45 AM IST
        
         Jaipur - Morning 7:05 AM IST

         Alwar - Morning 9:14 AM IST

         Delhi Sarai Rohilla - Afternoon 12:15 IST

== Rake sharing ==
The train shares its rake with 19667/19668 Udaipur City-Mysuru Palace Queen Humsafar Express.
