= Saroda =

- Location in Rajasthan, India Saroda (India)
- Coordinates: 23.68°N 74.02°E
- Country: India
- State: Rajasthan
- District: Dungarpur
- Elevation: 244 m (801 ft)

Population (2011)
  - Total: 6,000

Languages VAGDI
  - Official: Hindi
- Time zone: UTC+5:30 (IST)
- Postal code: 314032

Saroda is a village in Sagwara Tehsil in Dungarpur District in Rajasthan, India. It is situated 18 km away from sub-district headquarter Sagwara and 63 km away from district headquarter Dungarpur. As per 2009 stats, Saroda village is also a gram panchayat.

The total geographical area of village is 910 hectares. Saroda has a total population of 4,076 peoples. There are about 856 houses in Saroda village. Sagwara is nearest town to Saroda which is approximately 18 km away.
