= Khedbrahma railway station =

Railway station in Gujarat, India

Khedbrahma
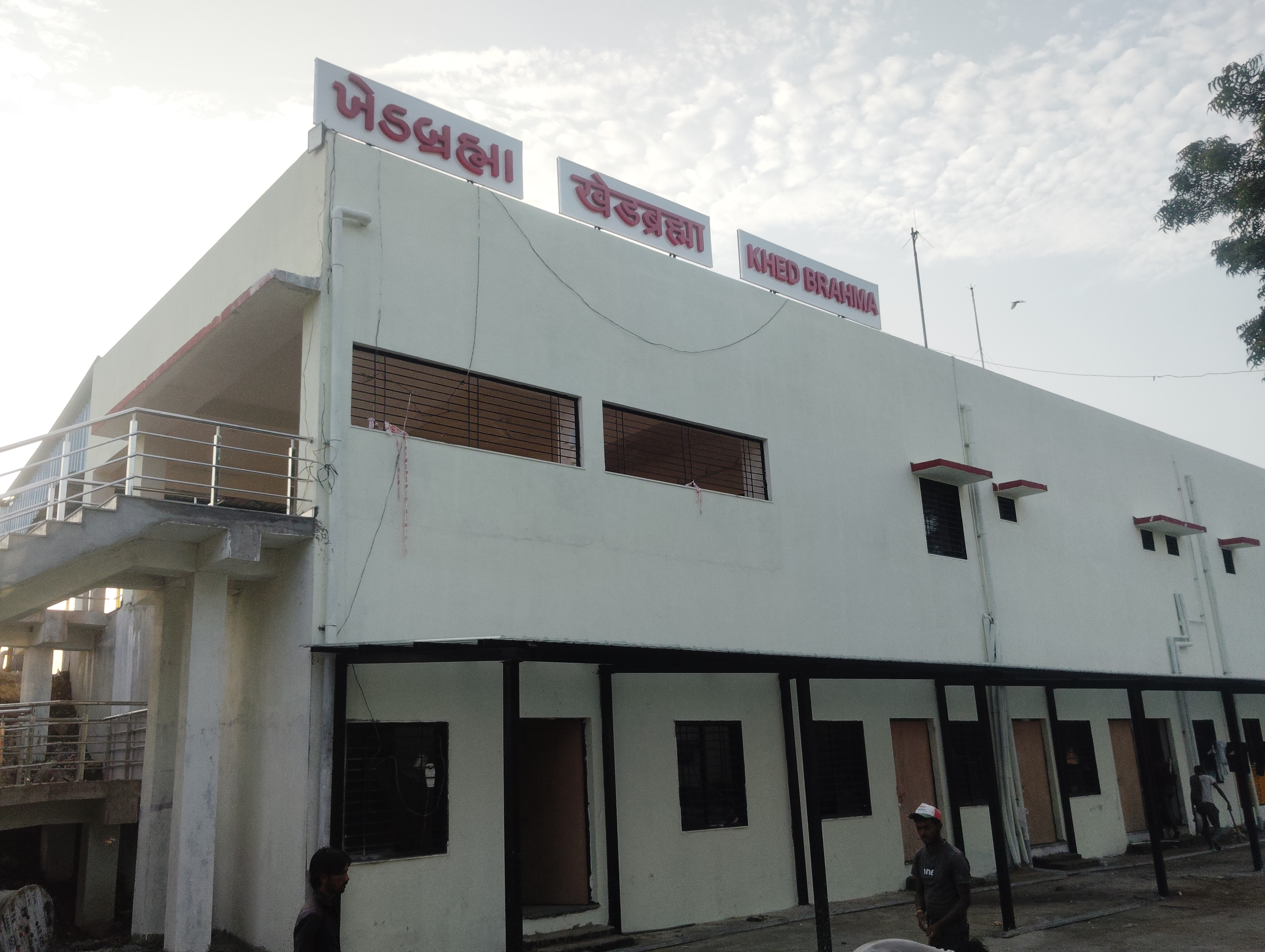
- Station building

General information
- Location: Khedbrahma, Sabarkantha district, Gujarat; India
- Coordinates: 24°01′46″N 73°02′29″E
- Elevation: 205 metres (673 ft)
- System: Indian Railways station
- Owner: Indian Railways
- Operator: Western Railway
- Line: Khedbrahma–Himatnagar–Ahmedabad line
- Platforms: 1
- Tracks: 3
- Connections: Auto stand

Construction
- Structure type: Standard (on ground)

Other information
- Station code: KDBM
- Zone(s): Western Railway
- Division(s): Ahmedabad

History
- Opened: 1911
- Closed: 2017
- Rebuilt: 2025
Location
- Location within India Location within Gujarat

Khedbrahma railway station is a railway station Sabarkantha district, Gujarat, India. Its code is KDBM. It serves Khedbrahma city. The station consists of a platform. The old station was part of the Ahmedabad–Himmatnagar metre-gauge railway line which was opened in 1911. It was rebuilt in 2025 after a completion of the conversion to the broad-gauge line.

== History ==
The Ahmedabad–Himmatnagar metre-gauge railway line was opened in 1897 by Ahmedabad–Parantij Railway Co. in three phases: Ahmedabad–Talod, Talod–Prantij, and Prantij–Himatnagar; all in the same year. Later it was extended from Himmatnagar to Khedbramha in 1911. This gave a total length of 88.70 miles (142.75 km) from Ahmedabad to Khedbrahma. It was a terminal station.

On 1 January 2017, the rail service is suspended for gauge conversion. In June 2022, ₹482 crore (US$50 million) were allocated for the project. The project was inaugurated on 18 June 2022 by Prime Minister Narendra Modi and was completed by August 2025.

The new railway station was completed in September 2025. The train service was resumed on 31 March 2026.

In July 2025, the Indian Railways allocated ₹1.15 crore (US$120,000) for a location survey and detailed project report (DPR) for the Khedbrahma–Hadad–Ambaji line connecting Taranga Hill–Ambaji–Abu Road line.

== Trains ==
- 69251 Asarva–Khed Brahma MEMU
- 69252 Khed Brahma–Asarva MEMU

== Gallery ==
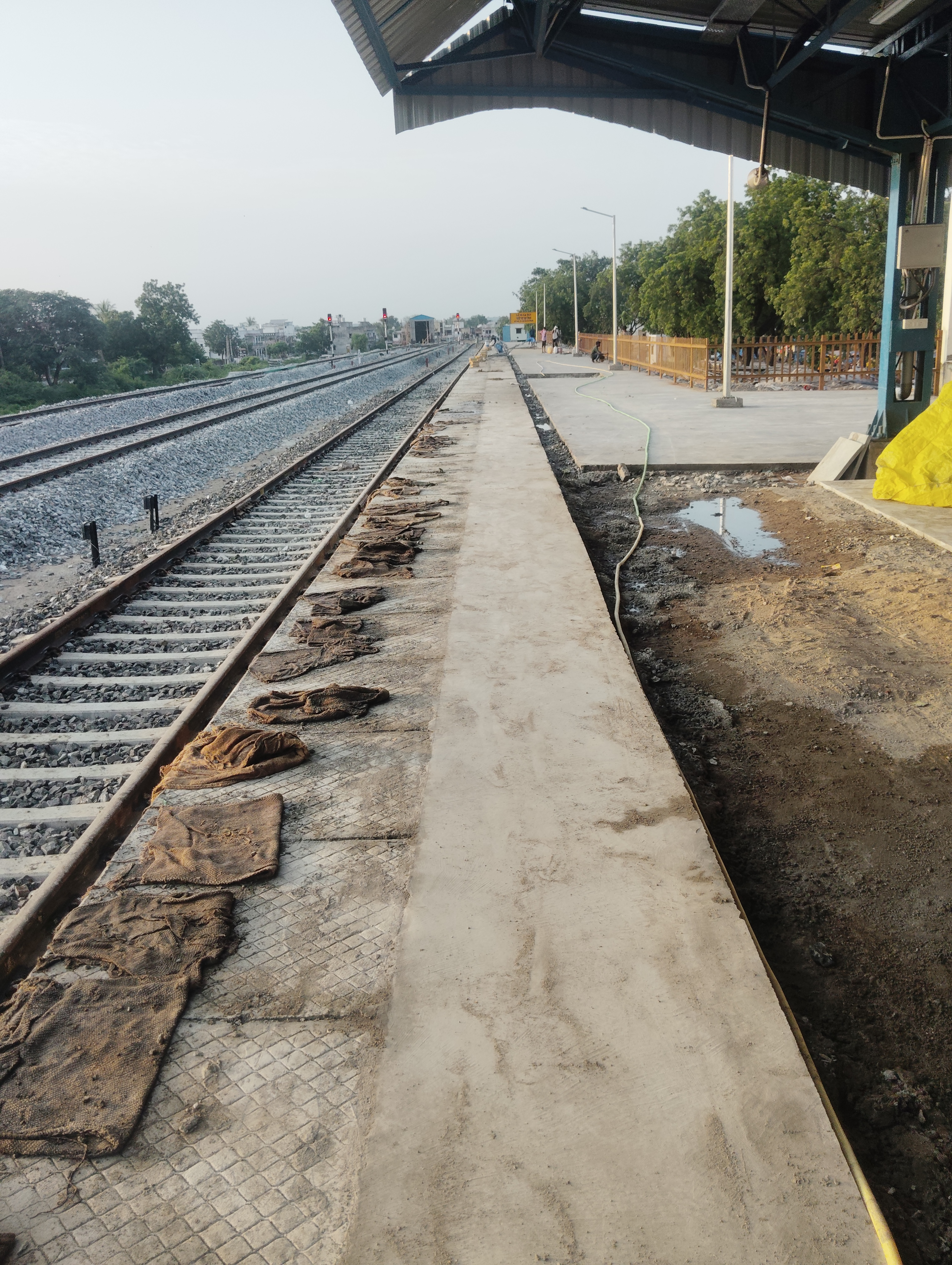
Platform 1 under construction, in 2025

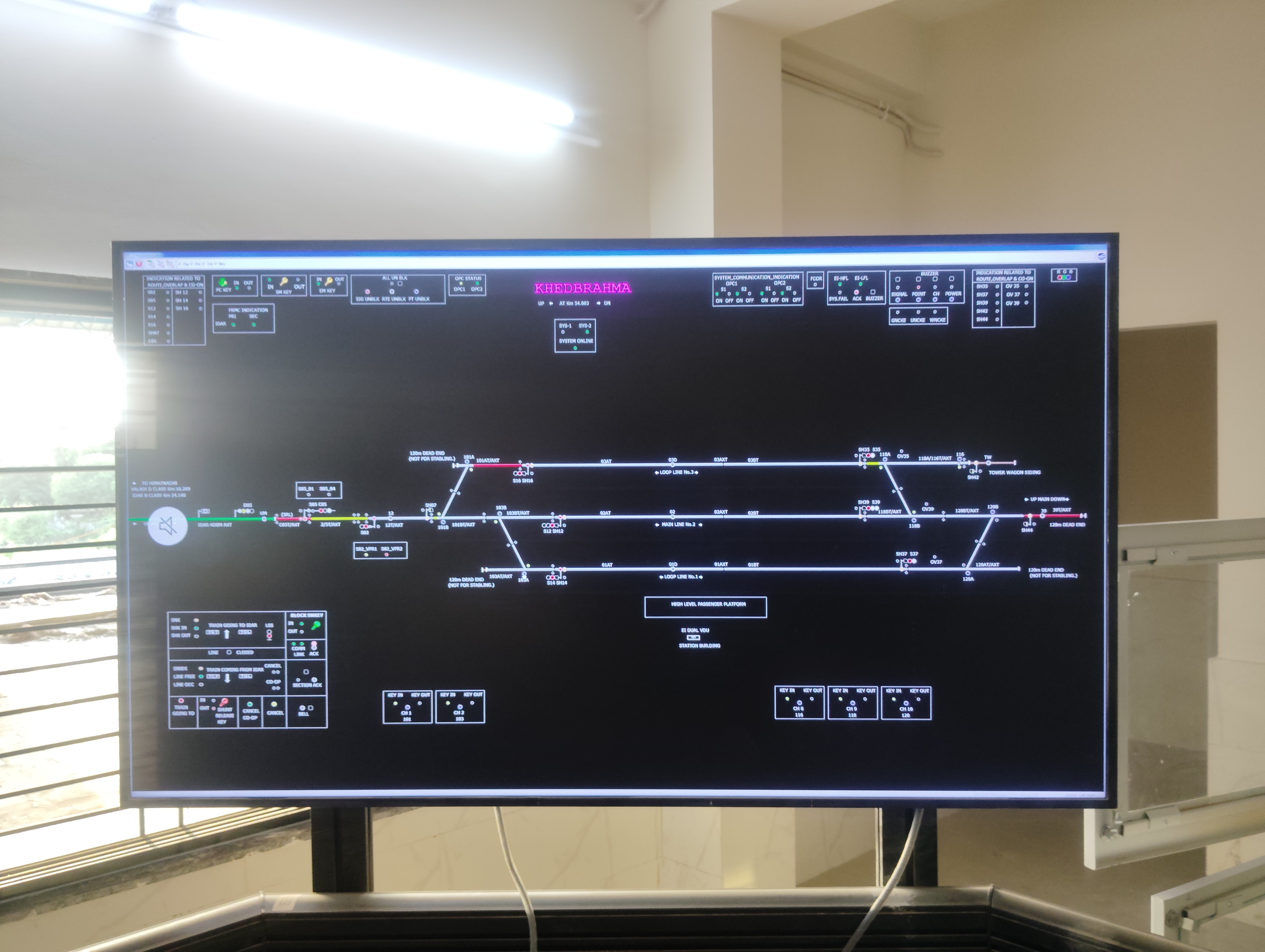
Schematic track diagram on Centralized Traffic Control (CTC)/Panel Interlocking display for Khedbrahma railway station
