= Sanoda =

- Village
- Location in Gujarat, India Sanoda (India)
- Coordinates: 23.15605°N 72.83385°E
- Country: India
- State: Gujarat
- District: Gandhinagar
- Elevation: 76 m (249 ft)

Population (2011)
  - Total: 5,763

Languages
  - Official: Gujarati, Hindi
- Time zone: UTC+5:30 (IST)
- PIN: 382305
- Vehicle registration: GJ 18
- Website: gujaratindia.com

Sanoda is a village in Dehgam Taluka in Gandhinagar district in the state of Gujarat, India.

== Demographics ==
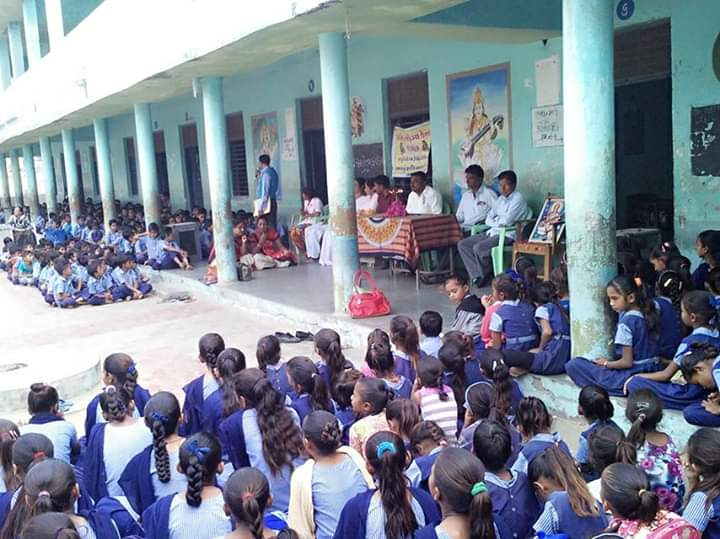
Sanoda Primary School

Sanoda had a population of 5763. As per the Population Census 2011, there are total 990 families residing in the village Sanoda. The total population of Sanoda is 5,763 out of which 2,980 are males and 2,783 are females thus the Average Sex Ratio of Sanoda is 934.

The population of Children of age 0-6 years in Sanoda village is 832 which is 14% of the total population. There are 445 male children and 387 female children between the age 0-6 years. Thus as per the Census 2011 the Child Sex Ratio of Sanoda is 870 which is less than Average Sex Ratio (934) of Sanoda village.

As per the Census 2011, the literacy rate of Sanoda is 78%. Thus Sanoda village has higher literacy rate compared to 74% of Gandhinagar district. The male literacy rate is 88.24% and the female literacy rate is 67.11% in Sanoda village. Sanoda village has different kinds of communities living. Such Koli Community, Devipujak Community, Dalit Community and other few communities.

== Geography ==
People of Sanoda go to Dehgam, Gandhinagar and Ahmedabad for shopping, education and entertainment. Shopping malls, good education institutes and multiplexes have not made a mark in this village.
