= Chitari Dungarpur =

Chitari Dungarpur Cheentri
- Village
- Location in Rajasthan, India Chitari Dungarpur (India)
- Coordinates: 23.56696°N 73.977101°E
- Country: India
- State: Rajasthan
- District: Dungarpur

Population (2011)
  - Total: 5,545

Languages
  - Official: Hindi
- Time zone: UTC+5:30 (IST)
- PIN: 314035
- ISO 3166 code: RJ-IN

Chitari is located 23.56696°N 73.977101°E about 163 km southeast of Udaipur, Rajasthan.

== Demography ==
There are 1219 houses in village. As of 2011 India census, Chitari has a population of 5545. Males constitute 2699 of the population and females 2846. Chitari has an average literacy rate of 56%, lower than the national average of 59.5%: male literacy is 67%, and female literacy is 47%. In Chitari, 14.42% of the population is under 6 years of age.
