= Sanchareswar Mahadev Temple =

- Location within Rajasthan Location within India

Religion
- Affiliation: Hinduism
- District: Udaipur
- Deity: Sanchareswar Mahadev (Shiva)

Location
- Location: Umarda village, Udaipur
- State: Rajasthan
- Country: India
- Interactive map of Sanchareswar Mahadev Temple
- Coordinates: 24.52°N 73.74°E

Sanchareswar Mahadev Temple is a temple of the lord Shiva in the Udaipur city in the state of Rajasthan, India.

== General ==
Sanchareswar Mahadev is a Hindu temple of Shiva, situated in Umarda village near Udaipur.
