= Sagwara Assembly constituency =

Legislative Assembly constituency in Rajasthan State, India

Coordinates: 23.67°N 74.02°E

Sagwara
- Constituency No. 160 for the Rajasthan Legislative Assembly

Constituency details
- Country: India
- Region: North India
- State: Rajasthan
- District: Dungarpur
- Lok Sabha constituency: Banswara
- Established: 1972
- Total electors: 276,048
- Reservation: ST

Member of Legislative Assembly
- 16th Rajasthan Legislative Assembly
- Incumbent Shankarlal Decha
- Party: Bharatiya Janata Party

Sagwara Assembly constituency is one of the 200 Legislative Assembly constituencies of Rajasthan state in India.

It is part of Dungarpur district and is reserved for candidates belonging to the Scheduled Tribes. As of 2023, it is represented by Shankarlal Decha of the Bharatiya Janata Party.

== Members of the Legislative Assembly ==
Year	Member	Picture	Party
2008	Surendra Kumar		Indian National Congress
2013	Anita Katara		Bharatiya Janata Party
2018	Ram Prasad		Bharatiya Tribal Party
2023	Shankarlal Decha		Bharatiya Janata Party

== Election results ==
=== 2023 ===
2023 Rajasthan Legislative Assembly election: Sagwara
Party	Candidate	Votes	%	±%
BJP	Sankarlal Decha	75,175	36.47	+5.52
BAP	Mohanlal Roat	63,176	30.65	
INC	Kailash Kumar Roat	46,742	22.68	−1.39
Independent	Devilal Ahari	5,497	2.67	
BTP	Mohanlal Roat	3,242	1.57	−32.02
Independent	Pannalal Dodiyar	2,175	1.06	
NOTA	None of the above	3,339	1.62	−0.29
Majority		11,999	5.82	+3.18
Turnout		206,117	74.67	+3.07
BJP gain from BTP		Swing		

=== 2018 ===
2018 Rajasthan Legislative Assembly election: Sagwara
Party	Candidate	Votes	%	±%
BTP	Ramprasad	58,406	33.59	
BJP	Shankarlal	53,824	30.95	
INC	Surendra Kumar	41,852	24.07	
Independent	Anita	10,140	5.83	
BSP	Dalji	4,173	2.4	
Independent	Man Singh	2,181	1.25	
NOTA	None of the above	3,313	1.91	
Majority		4,582	2.64	
Turnout		173,889	71.6	

== See also ==
- List of constituencies of the Rajasthan Legislative Assembly
- Dungarpur district
