= Sardargram railway station =

Railway station in Gujarat

General information
- Location: National Highway 8, Nava Naroda, Kuber Nagar, Ahmedabad, Gujarat; India
- Coordinates: 23.070758°N 72.641987°E
- Elevation: 59 metres (194 ft)
- System: Passenger train station
- Owner: Indian Railways
- Operator: Western Railway
- Line: Ahmedabad–Udaipur line
- Platforms: 1
- Tracks: 1

Construction
- Structure type: Standard (on-ground station)
- Parking: Yes

Other information
- Status: Functioning
- Station code: SDGM
- Zone(s): Western Railway
- Division(s): Ahmedabad

History
- Opened: 1879

Services
Preceding station	Indian Railways	Following station
Sahijpur towards ?	Western Railway zone Ahmedabad–Udaipur Line	Naroda towards ?
Location

Sardargram railway station is a railway station on Ahmedabad–Udaipur Line under the Ahmedabad railway division of Western Railway zone. This is situated beside National Highway 8 at Nava Naroda, Kuber Nagar in Ahmedabad of the Indian state of Gujarat.

== Trains ==
List of trains that take halt here:

- 19703/04 Asarva–Udaipur City Intercity Express
- 19329/30 Veer Bhumi Chittaurgarh Express(Asarva–Indore)
- 19821/22 Asarva–Kota Express
- 79401/02 Asarva–Himmatnagar DEMU
- 79403/04 Asarva–Himmatnagar DEMU
- 12981 Jaipur–Asarva SF Express
