= Nandol Dehegam railway station =

Railway station in Gujarat

General information
- Location: State Highway 141, Dahegam, Gandhinagar district, Gujarat; India
- Coordinates: 23.17417°N 72.815845°E
- Elevation: 76 metres (249 ft)
- System: Passenger train station
- Owner: Indian Railways
- Operator: Western Railway
- Line: Ahmedabad–Udaipur line
- Platforms: 2
- Tracks: 1

Construction
- Structure type: Standard (on-ground station)
- Parking: Yes

Other information
- Status: Functioning
- Station code: NHM
- Zone(s): Western Railway
- Division(s): Ahmedabad

History
- Opened: 1879

Services
Preceding station	Indian Railways	Following station
Dabhoda towards ?	Western Railway zone Ahmedabad–Udaipur Line	Jaliya Math towards ?
Location

Nandol Dehegam railway station is a railway station on Ahmedabad–Udaipur Line under the Ahmedabad railway division of Western Railway zone. This is situated beside State Highway 141 at Dahegam in Gandhinagar district of the Indian state of Gujarat.
