= Talod railway station =

Railway station in Gujarat, India

General information
- Location: Majara Road, Madhavgadh, Talod, Sabarkantha district, Gujarat; India
- Coordinates: 23.351348°N 72.947961°E
- Elevation: 111 metres (364 ft)
- System: Passenger train station
- Owner: Indian Railways
- Operator: Western Railway
- Line: Ahmedabad–Udaipur line
- Platforms: 2
- Tracks: 1

Construction
- Structure type: Standard (on-ground station)
- Parking: Yes

Other information
- Status: Functioning
- Station code: TOD
- Zone(s): Western Railway
- Division(s): Ahmedabad

History
- Opened: 1879

Services
Preceding station	Indian Railways	Following station
Kherol towards ?	Western Railway zone Ahmedabad–Udaipur Line	Khari Amrapur towards ?
Location

Talod railway station is a railway station on the Ahmedabad–Udaipur Line under the Ahmedabad railway division of the Western Railway zone. This is situated beside Majara Road at Madhavgadh, Talod in Sabarkantha district of the Indian state of Gujarat.

== Trains ==
- 79401/03 Asarva - Himmatnagar Demu
- 79402/04 Himmatnagar - Asarva Demu
- 09401 Asarva - Himmatnagar Demu Special
- 09402 Himmatnagar - Asarva Demu Special
- 19704 Asv Udz Exp
- 19703 Udz Asv Express
- 19315 Virbhumi Exp
- 19316 Virbhumi Exp
