= KRCD =

KRCD may refer to:

- Kings River Conservation District, dealing with the Kings River (California)
- KLXM, a radio station (103.9 FM) licensed to Inglewood, California, United States, which used the call sign KRCD from 2000 to 2026
- KRCD, the Indian Railways station code for Kharwa Chanda railway station, Rajasthan, India
