= Naroda railway station =

Railway station in Gujarat

General information
- Location: GIDC, Naroda, Ahmedabad, Gujarat; India
- Coordinates: 23.085662°N 72.658017°E
- Elevation: 61 metres (200 ft)
- System: Passenger train station
- Owner: Indian Railways
- Operator: Western Railway
- Line: Ahmedabad–Udaipur line
- Platforms: 3
- Tracks: 4

Construction
- Structure type: Standard (on-ground station)
- Parking: Yes

Other information
- Status: Functioning
- Station code: NRD
- Zone(s): Western Railway
- Division(s): Ahmedabad

History
- Opened: 1879

Services
| Preceding station | Indian Railways | Following station |
|---|---|---|
| Sardargram towards ? | Western Railway zone Ahmedabad–Udaipur Line | Medra towards ? |
Location

Naroda railway station is a railway station on Ahmedabad–Udaipur Line under the Ahmedabad railway division of Western Railway zone. This is situated at GIDC, Naroda in Ahmedabad of the Indian state of Gujarat.

== Trains ==
List of trains that take halt here:

- 19704/05 Asarva–Udaipur Intercity Express
- 19329/30 Veer Bhumi Chittaurgarh Express(Asarva–Indore)
- 79401/02 Asarva–Himmatnagar DEMU
- 79403/04 Asarva–Himmatnagar DEMU
