= Bichiwara tehsil =

Bichiwara Tehsil
- tehsil
- Location in Rajasthan, India Bichiwara Tehsil (India)
- Coordinates: 23°47′N 73°30′E
- Country: India
- State: Rajasthan
- District: Dungarpur

Languages
  - Official: Hindi
- Time zone: UTC+5:30 (IST)
- ISO 3166 code: RJ-IN
- Vehicle registration: RJ-

Bichiwara Tehsil is one of five tehsils in Dungarpur District of Rajasthan, India. It is in the western part of the district and borders on Gujarat. The village of Bichhiwara is the headquarters of the tehsil.

Bichiwara Tehsil is bounded by Kherwara Tehsil, of Udaipur District, to the northwest and north, by Dungarpur Tehsil to the east, by Simalwara Tehsil to the southeast, and by Meghraj Taluka and Bhiloda Taluka, both of Gujarat, to the southwest and west. It averages 328 metres (1,076 ft) in elevation.

In the 2015 panchayat samiti election the seats were split pretty evenly between the Congress Party (14 seats) and the BJP (11 seats).
