= Sagwara tehsil =

Tehsil in Dungarpur, Rajasthan, India

- Tehsil
- Location in Rajasthan, India Sagwara tehsil (India)
- Coordinates: 23°40′N 74°00′E
- Country: India
- State: Rajasthan
- District: Dungarpur

Languages
  - Official: Hindi, Rajasthani
- Time zone: UTC+5:30 (IST)
- ISO 3166 code: RJ-IN

Sagwara tehsil is one of five tehsils in Dungarpur District of Rajasthan, India. It is in the southeast part of the district and borders on the Mahi River. The town of Sagwara is the headquarters of the tehsil.

Sagwara Tehsil is bordered by Simalwara Tehsil to the southwest and west, Dungarpur Tehsil to the northwest, Aspur Tehsil on the north, Garhi Tehsil of Banswara District on the east, and Anandpuri Tehsil of Banswara District to the southeast.

== Towns and villages ==
Sagwara Tehsil has two towns, Sagwara, the administrative center, and Galiakot. It has 46 panchyat villages covering 244 villages:
