= Dahegam =

Dehgam Dahegam
- City
- Location in Gujarat, India Dehgam (India)
- Coordinates: 23.17°N 72.82°E
- Country: India
- State: Gujarat
- District: Gandhinagar

Government
  - Type: Municipality
  - Body: Dehgam NagarPalika

Area
  - Total: 27 km^{2} (10 sq mi)
- Elevation: 73 m (240 ft)

Population (2011)
  - Total: 80,532
  - Density: 3,000/km^{2} (7,700/sq mi)

Languages
  - Official: Gujarati, Hindi
- Time zone: UTC+5:30 (IST)
- Postal code: 382305
- Vehicle registration: GJ18
- Website: gujaratindia.com

Dahegam is a city and a municipality in the Gandhinagar district in the state of Gujarat, India.

== History ==
During 1257 AD, Gujarat was under the Khilji dynasty. Jafar Khan of the Tughlak dynasty had overpowered King Ram Ray Rathod of Idar. The Mughals took control of a majority of Gujarat during this period. Later, the Marathas administered the region during 1753 AD. Damaji Gaikwad is considered to be the most significant ruler. Dahegam taluka was founded in 1875 AD during Gaekwad rule and soon become a major political center in the area. It was conferred municipality or nagarpalika status in 1987 as a part of Ahmedabad district. When Ahmedabad district was halved in 1998, Dahegam became a part of Gandhinagar district.

== Geography ==
Dahegam is located at 23.17°N 72.82°E. It has an average elevation of 73 metres (239 feet).

== Demographics ==
As of 2011 India census, Dahegam had a population of 268562 . Males constitute 52% of the population and females 48%. Dahegam has an average literacy rate of 80.55%, higher than the national average of 59.5%: male literacy is 78.56% and, female literacy is 60.9%. In Dahegam, 13% of the population is under 6 years of age.

The taluka has different kinds of communities living in great harmony. Koli Community is the majority in the Dehgam Taluka. Though the Dahegam has different religious communities, all are living in unity. There are two big statues in this town, one of Babasaheb Ambedkar and the other of Sardar Vallabhbhai Patel. Dahegam is also famous for its (Leuva)Patel Community.

== Transport ==
Nandol Dehegam railway station is situated on Ahmedabad–Udaipur Line under the Ahmedabad railway division.
