= Sonasan railway station =

Railway station in Gujarat, India

General information
- Coordinates: 23.4882847°N 72.8938435°E
- Owner: Indian Railways
- Operator: Western Railway
- Line: Ahmedabad–Udaipur Line

Construction
- Structure type: Standard (on ground station)

Other information
- Status: Active
- Station code: SNSN
Location
- Location within India Location within Gujarat

Sonasan railway station (code:SNSN) is situated on Ahmedabad–Udaipur Line serves Sonasan, Gujarat, India. Ten trains halt at this station each day.
