= Jai Samand Road Railway Station =

Railway station in Rajasthan, India

Jai Samand Road Railway Station जय समन्द रोड

General information
- Location: MDR 11, Dengari, Rajasthan; India
- Elevation: 267 m (876 ft)
- System: Indian Railways Station
- Owner: Indian Railways
- Operator: North Western Railway
- Platforms: 2

Construction
- Structure type: Standard (on-ground station)

Other information
- Station code: JYM
- Fare zone: North Western Railway
Location

Jai Samand Road Railway Station (station code: JYM) is a railway station located in Dengari, Rajasthan, India. It falls under the jurisdiction of the Ajmer division of the North Western Railway (NWR). Positioned at an elevation of 267 meters above sea level, the station features two platforms and facilitates the boarding and deboarding of passengers traveling through this area.

== Overview ==
Jai Samand Road Railway Station is strategically placed near MDR 11 in the Dengari locality of Rajasthan, serving as a key halt point for several trains in the region. It provides essential connectivity within Rajasthan and to adjoining states, despite not originating or terminating any trains. The station's proximity to Udaipur enhances its importance as a conduit for local and intercity travel.

== Services ==
The station witnesses regular halts from a multitude of trains, offering vital links to the major cities and towns for the local populace. Its two platforms accommodate the flow of passengers efficiently, making it a crucial node in the railway network of the area.

== See also ==
- List of railway stations in India
- Indian Railways
- North Western Railway zone
