= Dungarpur railway station =

Railway Station in Rajasthan, India

General information
- Location: State Highway 10, Dungarpur, Rajasthan; India
- Elevation: 274 metres (899 ft)
- System: Indian Railways station
- Owner: Indian Railways
- Operator: North Western Railway
- Line: Himmatnagar–Udaipur City railway line
- Platforms: 1
- Tracks: 2

Construction
- Structure type: Standard (on-ground station)
- Parking: No
- Cycle facilities: No

Other information
- Status: Active
- Station code: DNRP
- Zone(s): North Western Railway
- Division(s): Ajmer

History
- Opened: 1961
Location

Dungarpur railway station is a small railway station in Dungarpur district, Rajasthan. Its code is DNRP. It serves Dungarpur town. The station consists of a single platform. The platform is not well sheltered. It lacks many facilities including water and sanitation.
