= Ahmedabad–Udaipur Express =

Train in India

Ahmedabad Udaipur MG (Delhi) Express
Overview
- Service type: Express
- Status: Gauge conversion 1,000 millimetres (3.3 ft)metre gauge to broad gauge1,676 millimetres (5.499 ft)
- First service: 23 November 1891; 133 years ago
- Last service: (Service to Delhi)31 March 2005; 20 years ago, (Service to Udaipur)31 December 2016; 8 years ago
- Current operator: Western Railways

Route
- Termini: Ahmedabad Junction; Delhi Sarai Rohilla (until 2005), Udaipur City until 2016.
- Stops: 29 until 2006, 7 until 2016
- Distance travelled: 1,020 kilometres (630 mi) (until 2005), 298 kilometres (185 mi)
- Service frequency: Daily
- Train number: 19943/19944

On-board services
- Classes: A/C sleeper, First Class, Sleeper class, General Unreserved
- Seating arrangements: Yes
- Sleeping arrangements: Yes

Technical
- Operating speed: 32.49 kilometres per hour (20.19 mph) (until 2005); 29.16 kilometres per hour (18.12 mph) (until 2016)

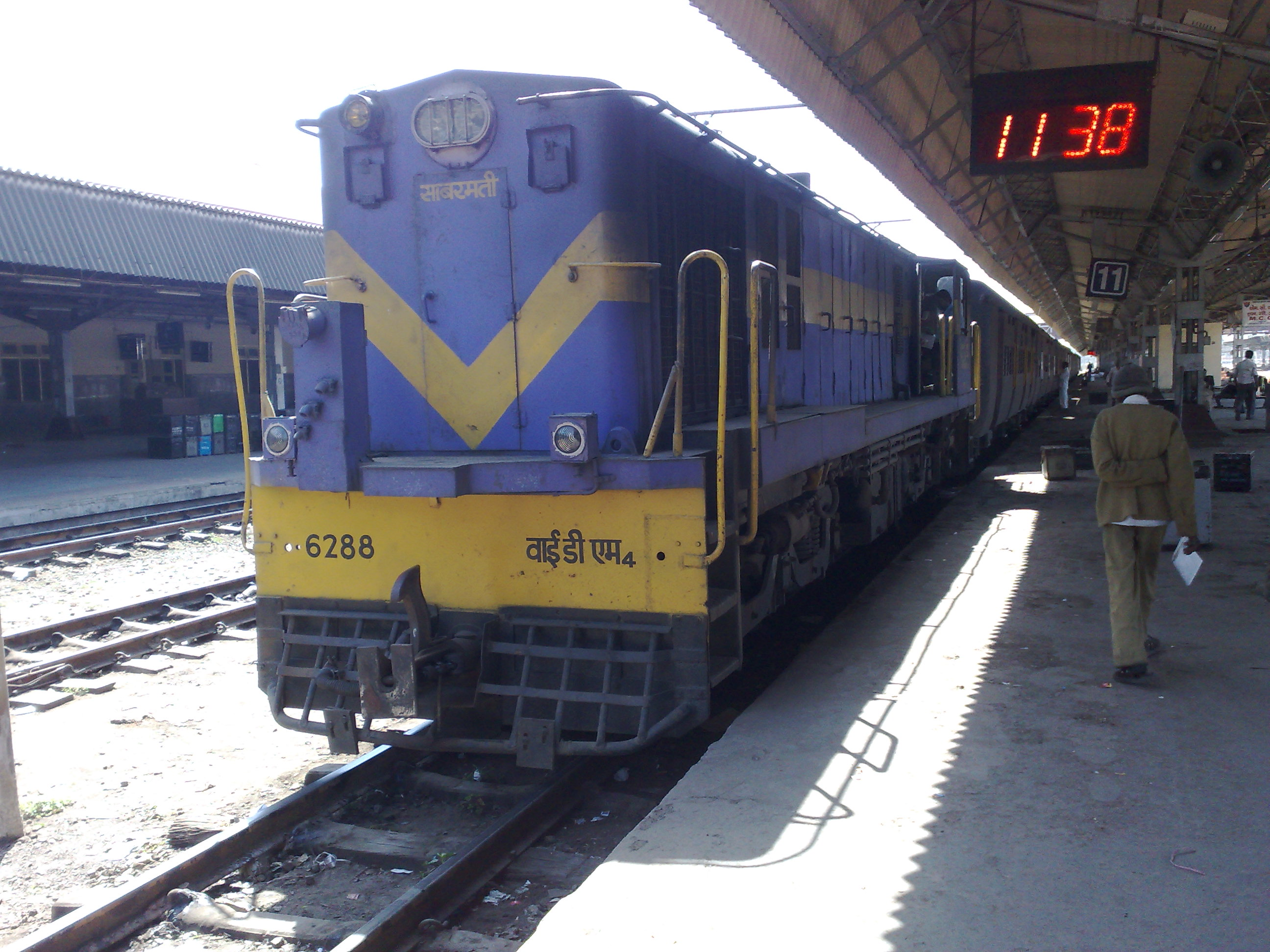
YDM-4 at Ahmedabad

The 19943 / 19944 Ahmedabad Junction–Udaipur–Delhi Sarai Rohilla Express was a metre-gauge Express train belonging to Indian Railways – Western Railway zone that ran between Ahmedabad Junction & Delhi Sarai Rohilla until 2005 & then to Udaipur City until 2016 in India. It ran as train number 19943 from Ahmedabad Junction to Delhi Sarai Rohilla until 2005 & then to Udaipur City until 2016 and as train number 19944 in the reverse direction.

The train was discontinued due to track conversion to broad gauge after 125 years of service.

== Operations until 2005 ==
This train ran from Delhi Sarai Rohillia to Ahmedabad Jn via Ajmer, Udaipur, Himmatnagar until March 2005. After the gauge conversion between Ajmer and Udaipur the train ran from Udaipur to Ahmedabad from April 2005 to December 2016.

Originally until 2005, it used to run cover distance of 1,020 kilometres (630 mi) in 31 hrs 30 mins at speed of (32.49 kilometres per hour (20.19 mph)) as 19944 and in 31 hours 30 mins as 19943 at speed of 32.49 kilometres per hour (20.19 mph). Timings were Ahmedabad Junction departure 23.05 hrs, Udaipur City departure 09.40 hrs, Chittaurgarh Junction arrival 12.45 hrs & departure 13.45 hrs, Ajmer Junction departure 18.50 hrs, Jaipur Junction arrival 21.35 hrs & departure 22.35 hrs & Delhi Sarai Rohilla arrival 06.35 hrs at 3rd morning as 19943. In return Delhi Sarai Rohilla departure 20.30 hrs, Jaipur Junction arrival 04.30 hrs & departure 05.30 hrs, Ajmer Junction departure 08.25 hrs, Chittaurgarh Junction arrival 13.20 hrs & departure 14.20 hrs, Udaipur City departure 17.45 hrs & Ahmedabad Junction arrival 04.00 hrs at 3rd morning as 19944. The express train ran from Ahmedabad Junction via Himmatnagar Junction, Dungarpur, Kharwa Chanda, Udaipur City, Chittaurgarh Junction (reversal of loco took place with 1 hour halt time), Bhilwara, Ajmer Junction, Phulera Junction, Jaipur Junction (reversal of loco took place with 1 hour halt time), Ringas Junction & Rewari Junction to Delhi Sarai Rohilla, halting at 29 stops in between. The train was hauled by Sabarmati or Phulera-based YDM-4 Twins for its entire journey. The express train had 16 car rake consisting of 1 A/c sleeper coach, 1 first class coach, 8 sleeper class coaches, 4 General Unreserved coaches and 2 SLR (seating cum luggage rake) coaches. It did not carry a pantry car.

== Operations between 2005 and 2016 ==
After the gauge conversion between Ajmer and Udaipur in 2005, this express train started to cover the distance of 298 kilometres (185 mi) in 10 hours 15 mins at speed of 29.16 kilometres per hour (18.12 mph) as 19944 and in 10 hours 15 mins as 19943 at speed of 29.16 kilometres per hour (18.12 mph). Timings were Ahmedabad Junction departure 23.05 hrs, Himmatnagar Junction departure 02.00 hrs, Dungarpur departure 05.00 hrs, Kharwa Chanda departure 07.44 hrs & Udaipur Cit} arrival 09.20 hrs next morning as 19943. In return Udaipur City departure 17.45 hrs, Kharwa Chanda departure 19.23 hrs, Dungarpur departure 22.15 hrs, Himmatnagar Junction departure 01.15 hrs & Ahmedabad Junction arrival 04.00 hrs next morning as 19944. The express train ran from Ahmedabad Junction via Himmatnagar Junction, Dungarpur, Kharwa Chanda to Udaipur City, halting at 7 stops in between. The train was hauled by a Sabarmati-based YDM-4 for its entire journey. The express train had 1 1 A/c sleeper & 1 First Class coaches until 2013 (it was removed due to less demand), 5 sleeper class (3 removed due to less demand in 2011), 5 General Unreserved and 2 SLR (seating cum luggage rake) coaches. It did not carry a pantry car.
