= Bichhiwara =

Bichhiwara Bichhiwara
- Village
- Location in Rajasthan, India Bichhiwara (India)
- Coordinates: 23°47′12″N 073°31′23″E
- Country: India
- State: Rajasthan
- District: Dungarpur district
- Tehsil: Bichiwara

Languages
  - Official: Hindi
- Time zone: UTC+5:30 (IST)
- PIN: 314801
- ISO 3166 code: RJ-IN

Bichhiwara is a panchayat village in Rajasthan in western India. Administratively, Bichhiwara is under Bichiwara Tehsil of Dungarpur District in Rajasthan. Bichhiwara is the administrative headquarters for its tehsil. The village of Bichhiwara is 11 km by road northeast of the border with Aravalli District, Gujarat, along National Highway 8 and 22 km by road west of the town of Dungarpur, the district capital. The nearest railway station is Bechhiwara railway station (BHWA), 1.3 km by road west of the village.

There are three villages in the gram panchayat: Bichhiwara, Devpura and Nayagaon Punali.

== Demographics ==
At the 2001 census, the village of Bichhiwara had 4000 inhabitants, with 2,050 males (51.2%) and 1,950 females (48.8%). By the 2011 census it had grown to 4,836 inhabitants, with 2,485 males (51.4%) and 2,351 females (48.6%).
