= Galiakot =

Galiyakot Wagad Taherabad
- Town
- Galiyakot
- Location in Rajasthan, India Galiyakot (India)
- Coordinates: 23.536°N 74.009°E
- Country: India
- State: Rajasthan
- District: Dungarpur
- Elevation: 145 m (476 ft)

Population (2001)
  - Total: 6,636

Languages
  - Official: Hindi, Rajasthani, wagdhi
- Time zone: UTC+5:30 (IST)
- Postal code: 314026
- ISO 3166 code: RJ-IN

Galiyakot is a town in Dungarpur District of Rajasthan, India. It is situated about 56 km from Dungarpur city and 168 km from the Rajasthan city of Udaipur. It was controlled by the Parmar dynasty around Vikram Samvat 1000. In Vikram Samvat 1342, Rao Dedu (Devpal), Raja of the Sisodiya dynasty, subdued Galiyakot. The predecessors of Dungarpur controlled Galiyakot for many years before settling in Dungarpur. It is part of a Dawoodi Bohra pilgrimage site and contains many Hindu temples, including the Shitla Mata Mandir and the tomb of Babji Moula Syedi Fakhruddin.

== Geography ==
Galiakot is located at 23.536°N 74.009°E. It has an average elevation of 145 metres (475 feet).

== Demographics ==
As of 2001, the India census reported that Galiakot had a population of 6,636. Males constitute 51% of the population and females 49%. Galiakot has an average literacy rate of 56%, which is lower than the national average of 59.5%. Male literacy stands at 67%, while female literacy is 44%. In Galiakot, 17% of the population is under 6 years of age. The town is also known for Ramkada Udhyog.
