= Taranga Hill–Ambaji–Abu Road line =

Indian proposed railway line

Taranga Hills–Ambaji–Abu Road line

Overview
- Status: Under construction
- Owner: Indian Railways
- Locale: Gujarat and Rajasthan
- Termini: Taranga Hills railway station; Abu Road railway station
- Stations: 15

Service
- Type: Regional rail
- System: Western Railway
- Operator: Western Railway

History
- Opened: under construction

Technical
- Line length: 116.65 km
- Track gauge: 1,676 mm (5 ft 6 in)

Taranga Hills–Ambaji–Abu Road line is an under construction railway line in India that will connect Taranga Hills and Abu Road. The line will connect major pilgrimages and tourist places such as Taranga, Ambaji and Abu Road. A station in style of Ambaji Temple will be built at Ambaji town in Gujarat and then line will pass through Rajasthan and will connect to Abu Road railway station.

== History ==
The line is proposed by Union Cabinet Committee of Economic Affairs in 2022. The expected cost of proposed railway line is estimated of ₹2798.16 crore by Indian Railways and it is expected to be completed in 2026–27.

In July 2025, the Indian Railways allocated ₹1.15 crore (US$120,000) for a location survey and detailed project report (DPR) for the Khedbrahma–Hadad–Ambaji line connecting Taranga Hill–Ambaji–Abu Road line.

== Routes ==
It will pass through four districts,

Gujarat

- Mehsana district
- Sabarkantha district
- Banaskantha district

Rajasthan

- Sirohi district

There will be 15 new railway stations built in phases. Taranga Hills Railway Station will be built on the theme of Jain temple which part of 24 holy places for Jaina and Ambaji Railway Station will be themed on Ambaji temple which is one of the 51 Shakti Pitha.

The proposed line is aimed to boost local industries like marble and agriculture. And will be an alternative to the Ahmedabad–Abu Road route line.
