= Umarda =

- Village
- Country: India
- State: Rajasthan
- District: Udaipur

Area
  - Total: 16.32 km^{2} (6.30 sq mi)

Population (2011)
  - Total: 4,506
  - Density: 276.1/km^{2} (715.1/sq mi)

Languages
  - Official: Hindi, Mewari
- Time zone: UTC+5:30 (IST)
- PIN: 313003
- Vehicle registration: RJ-
- Nearest city: Udaipur
- Lok Sabha constituency: Udaipur

Umarda is a village in Udaipur district in the Indian state of Rajasthan. As per Population Census 2011, the total population of Umarda is 4,506, literacy rate of Umarda village was 49.8 % which is very low compared to 66.11 % of Rajasthan. The District head quarter of the village is Udaipur.

== Education ==
Umarda is home to various government, deemed and private school and colleges. RR Dental College & Hospital, SS College and Pacific Institute Of Medical Sciences are the major government colleges in Umarda.

== See also ==
- Umarda Railway Station
