= Sagwara =

- City
- Location in Rajasthan, India Sagwara (India)
- Coordinates: 23°40′05″N 74°01′28″E
- Country: India
- State: Rajasthan
- District: Dungarpur
- Tehsil: Sagwara Tehsil

Government
  - Body: SUB DIVISIONAL MAGISTRATE
  - Rank: 1
- Elevation: 244 m (801 ft)

Population (2011)
  - Total: 30,993

Languages
  - Official: Hindi, Rajasthani, Wagdi
- Time zone: UTC+5:30 (IST)
- Postal code: 314025
- ISO 3166 code: RJ-IN
- Website: http://sagwara.webs.com/

Sagwara is a city and municipality, near Dungarpur city in Dungarpur district in the Indian state of Rajasthan. It is one of two towns in Sagwara Tehsil, and the administrative center for the Sagwara Tehsil's additional district court and sub jailkshla.

== Geography and economy ==
Sagwara is located in the east-central Dungarpur district, in Sagwara Tehsil. It has an average elevation of 244 metres (801 ft). Sagwara is famous for its sculpture, marble carving, temple architecture and gold jewelry. It is a major trading hub for nearby villages.

== Demographics ==
While in the 2001 Indian census, Sagwara had a population of 30,993, by the 2011 census that number had dropped to 29,439. Males, while still fewer than females, increased their percentage from 49.3% to 49.9% of the population from 2001 to 2011. Sagwara significantly increased their average literacy rate from 2001 to 2011 going from 59% to 79%. Male literacy rose from 68% to 88%, and female literacy rose from 50% to 71%. From 2001 to 2011 the population in Sagwara aged, going from 16% below the age of six, to 13%.

Sagwara is the third largest populated place after Banswara and Dungarpur in the historical areas of Rajasthan. The majority of the population is of the Hindu religion and it also has a significant population of Jainism and Dawoodi Bohra (a Shia Islamic Muslim community).
