= Shamlaji Road railway station =

Railway station in Gujarat, India

General information
- Location: State Highway 5, Lalpur, Shamlaji, Aravalli district, Gujarat; India
- Coordinates: 23.621619°N 73.335655°E
- Elevation: 190 metres (620 ft)
- System: Indian Railways
- Owner: Indian Railways
- Operator: North Western Railway
- Line: Ahmedabad–Udaipur line
- Platforms: 3
- Tracks: 1

Construction
- Structure type: Standard (on-ground station)
- Parking: Yes

Other information
- Status: Functioning
- Station code: SJS
- Zone(s): North Western Railway
- Division(s): Ajmer

History
- Opened: 1879

Services
Preceding station	Indian Railways	Following station
Raigadh Road towards ?	North Western Railway zone Ahmedabad–Udaipur Line	Lusadiya towards ?
Location

Shamlaji Road railway station is a railway station on Ahmedabad–Udaipur Line under the Ajmer railway division of North Western Railway zone. This is situated beside State Highway 5 at Lalpur, Shamlaji in Aravalli district of the Indian state of Gujarat.
