= Udaipur City–Mysuru Palace Queen Humsafar Express =

Train in India

Udaipur City - Mysuru Junction Palace Queen Humsafar Express

Overview
- Service type: Humsafar Express
- First service: 26 February 2018; 8 years ago (Inaugural service)
- Current operator: North Western Railway

Route
- Termini: Udaipur City (UDZ); Mysore Junction (MYS)
- Stops: 12
- Distance travelled: 2,256 km (1,402 mi)
- Average journey time: 43 hrs 45 mins
- Service frequency: Weekly. (Note: Runs once in a week for every direction.)
- Train number: 19667 / 19668

On-board services
- Class: AC 3 Tier
- Seating arrangements: No
- Sleeping arrangements: Yes
- Catering facilities: Available
- Observation facilities: Large windows
- Entertainment facilities: Yes
- Baggage facilities: No
- Other facilities: Below the seats

Technical
- Rolling stock: LHB Humsafar
- Track gauge: 1,676 mm (5 ft 6 in)
- Operating speed: 53 km/h (33 mph) average including halts.

The 19667 / 19668 Udaipur City - Mysuru Palace Queen Humsafar Express is a Humsafar Express operated by Indian Railways which connected Udaipur city railway station in Rajasthan and Mysuru Junction railway station in Karnataka. It is currently operated with 19667/19668 train numbers on a weekly basis.

== Route and halts ==
1. Udaipur City
2. Chittaurgarh Junction
3. Neemuch
4. Mandsaur
5. Ratlam Junction
6. Vadodara Junction
7. Surat
8. Vasai Road
9. Kalyan Junction
10. Karjat
11. Lonavala
12. Pune Junction
13. Sangli
14. Miraj Junction
15. Belgaum
16. Hubli Junction
17. Davangere
18. Bangalore City
19. Mandya
20. Mysore

== Traction ==
While the train was formerly operated using WDM-3A / WDM-3D locomotives during the unelectrified sections of South Western Railways and simultaneously North Western Railways, now the train runs with an Erode-based WAP-7 from Udaipur to Hubballi. Krishnarajapuram or Bhagat Ki Kothi-based WDP-4D hauls the train for the remaining distance from Hubballi to Mysuru and vice versa. As of current times, the train is totally run with a 3 phase loco end to end by any of the aforementioned sheds locos.

== Rake sharing ==
The train shares its rake with 22985/22986 Udaipur City-Delhi Sarai Rohilla Rajasthan Humsafar Express.
