= Zawar =

Settlement in Udaipur, Rajasthan, India

Zawar Jawar
- Interactive map of Zawar
- Coordinates: 27.15°N 88.35°E
- Country: India
- State: Rajasthan
- District: Udaipur

Population (2011)
  - Total: 3,213

National Geological Monuments of India
- Official name: Zawar Lead–Zinc mine
- Designated: 2016
- Designated by: Geological Survey of India

Zawar or Jawar, is a mining township in Udaipur district, Rajasthan, India. The site is known for its ancient lead–zinc mines, which is declared as a National Geological Monument by the Geological Survey of India.

== History ==
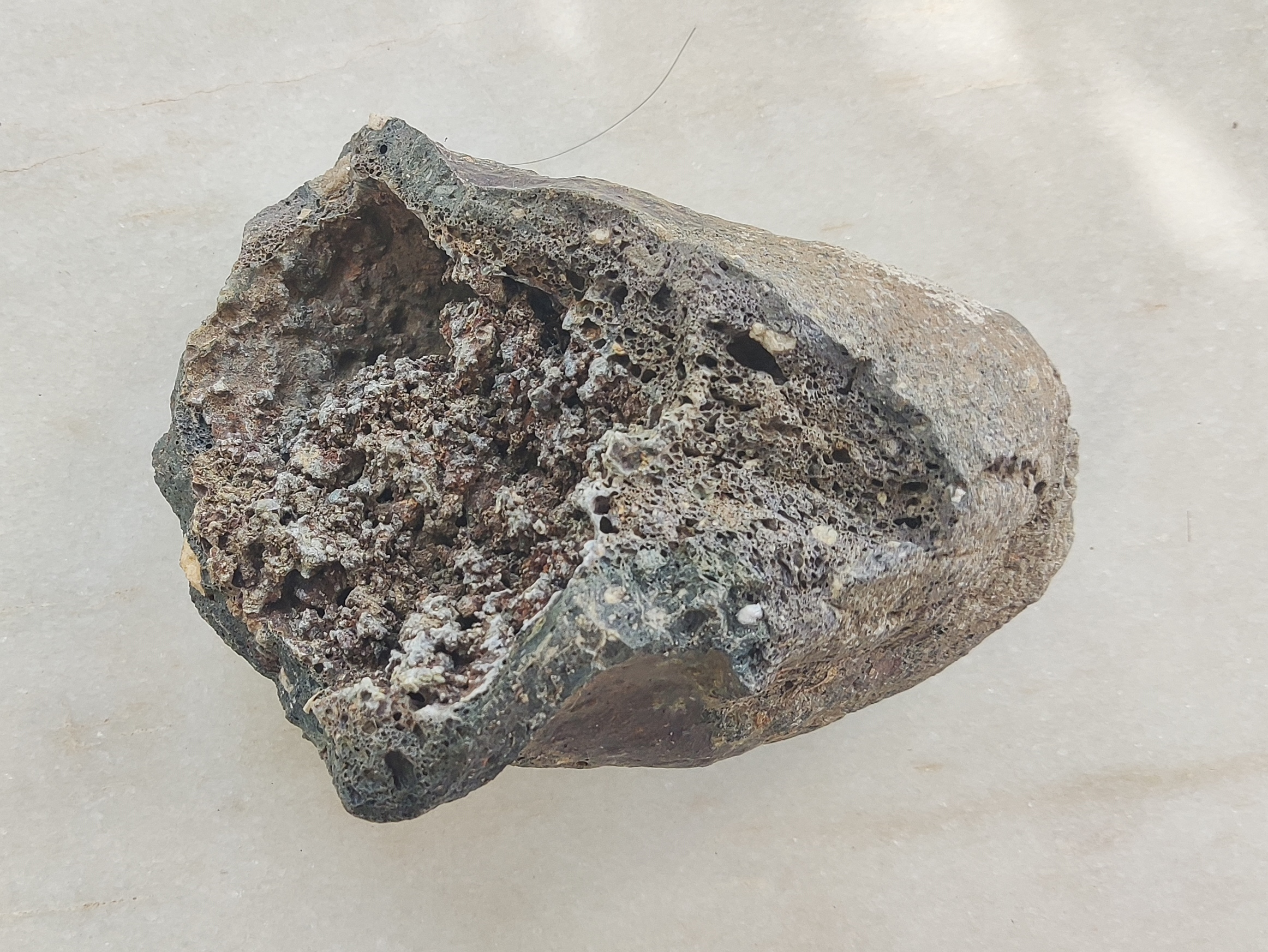
Remnants of a retort from ancient zinc smelting at Jawar

Archaeological evidence indicate that zinc mining and large-scale production took place in Zawar at least as early as 750 BCE. Remnants of retorts used for distillation during the zinc production process, have been found. The Bhil people, who inhabited the region, devised unique clay retorts for the process, which had a cylinder of 10 cm (3.9 in) diameter with a 30 cm (12 in) long and 1 cm (0.39 in) wide cylindrical pipe on the other end. The interior of these retorts were coated with turmeric. The zinc containing ore was placed together with charcoal in the cylinder and the retorts were sealed. About 36 retorts were placed on a specially designed clay substrate and heated in a furnace to 1,000–1,150 °C (1,830–2,100 °F). The metal vapours collected in the pipe were cooled and liquified later. The used retorts were used as construction materials.

Zawar was the first center globally to produce zinc on an industrial scale. Zinc originating in Zawar were used to make brass and for minting coins. It might have been exported as well with Indian brass found in Persia and later to Europe via China. Silver was also mined at Zawar mostly by using hand tools. They were then smelted in clay vessels. Zawar exported silver jewellery in the 13th century, and the town possibly got its name from jawaharat, the Urdu word for jewellery. The region also hosts several Hindu and Jain temples dating to the Middle Ages. It is mentioned as a pilgrimage and mining center in a poem by Somakirti in 1461. The late 16th century Persian text Ain-i-Akbari by Abul Fazal mentions zinc being mined at Zawar. Records by administrator Munhta Nainsi from 1657 gives financial details on the silver production and trade at Jawar.

With Chinese zinc exports, and the discovery of new distillation process of zinc in the 18th century, Zawar lost its importance. Political instability due to various foreign invasions and several famines also affected the zinc mining activities. As zinc had been continuously mined for centuries, the depth at which the ore was obtained went deeper, which made it difficult to extract the ore. The zinc mining and smelting activities at Zawar ceased in 1812. Based on a report by the Geological Survey of India (GSI) in 1942, the Indian government tasked the public sector enterprise, the Metal Corporation of India, to explore the possibilities of resuming mining at Zawar. In 1965, the mines were handed over to Hindustan Zinc Limited, which operated four mines, which extracted lead and zinc ores. The site was designated as an International Historical Landmark by the American Society of Metals in 1988. It was declared as a National Geological Monument by the Geological Survey of India in 2018.

== Demographics ==
As per the 2011 Census of India, Zawar had a population of 3,213 individuals of which 1,652 were males and 1,561 were females. About 552 (17.2%) were under the age of six years. Zawar had a literacy rate of 67.8%, slightly higher than the state average of 66.1%. Male literacy was 82.9% and female literacy rate was 51.8%. It is constituted as a village panchayat and is headed by a sarpanch.

== Geography and geology ==
Zawar is located about 35 km (22 mi) from Udaipur in Udaipur district, Rajasthan, India. It lies close to the Tiri River, which has been contaminated by the mining activity in the region. There is a dedicated powerplant with an installed capacity of 80 MW to support the township and the mining operations.

Zinc and lead occur as sulfide ores on carbonate bearing sedimentary rocks of the Aravalli Supergroup. These ores occur in a shear zone dating to the Precambrian.
