= Chanderiya railway station =

Railway station in Rajasthan, India

Chanderiya
- Indian Railways logo

General information
- Location: NH-79, Chittorgarh, Rajasthan; India
- Coordinates: 24.938082°N 74.629062°E
- Elevation: 409 metres (1,342 ft)
- System: Indian Railways station
- Owner: Indian Railways
- Operator: Western Railways
- Lines: Ajmer–Ratlam section, Chittaurgarh–Udaipur section, Kota–Chittaurgarh line
- Platforms: 3
- Tracks: 6

Construction
- Structure type: Standard (on-ground station)
- Parking: Yes
- Accessible: Available

Other information
- Status: Functioning
- Station code: CNA
- Zone(s): Western Railway zone
- Division(s): Ratlam
Location
- Location within Rajasthan Location within India

Chanderiya railway station is a railway station in Chittaurgarh district, Rajasthan. Its code is CNA. The station consists of 3 platforms. Passenger, Express, and Superfast trains halt here.
