= Asarva railway station =

Railway station in Gujarat, India

General information
- Location: Asarwa, Ahmedabad, Gujarat; India
- Coordinates: 23.043630°N 72.613159°E
- Elevation: 53 metres (174 ft)
- System: Indian Railways station
- Owner: Indian Railways
- Operator: Western Railway
- Line: Ahmedabad–Udaipur line
- Platforms: 3
- Tracks: 5
- Connections: Auto stand

Construction
- Structure type: Standard (on-ground station)
- Parking: Yes
- Cycle facilities: Yes

Other information
- Status: Functioning
- Station code: ASV
- Zone(s): Western Railway
- Division(s): Ahmedabad
Location
- Location within Ahmedabad Location within Gujarat Location within India

Asarva railway station is now one of the main railway stations on Ahmedabad–Udaipur line in Ahmedabad district, Gujarat. Its code is ASV. It serves Asarwa area of Ahmedabad city. The station consists of 3 platforms.

== Trains ==
Some of the trains that runs from Asarva (Ahmedabad) Railway station are :

- 26963/64 Udaipur City–Asarva (Ahmedabad) Vande Bharat Express (Asarva–Udaipur)
- 19329/30 Veer Bhumi Chittaurgarh Express (Asarva–Indore)
- 19704/05 Asarva–Udaipur Intercity Express
- 79401/02 Asarva–Himmatnagar MEMU
- 12981/82 Asarva–Jaipur SF Express
- 19821/22 Asarva–Kota Express
- 69243/44 Asarva–Chittaurgarh MEMU
