= Himmatnagar Junction railway station =

Railway station in Gujarat, India

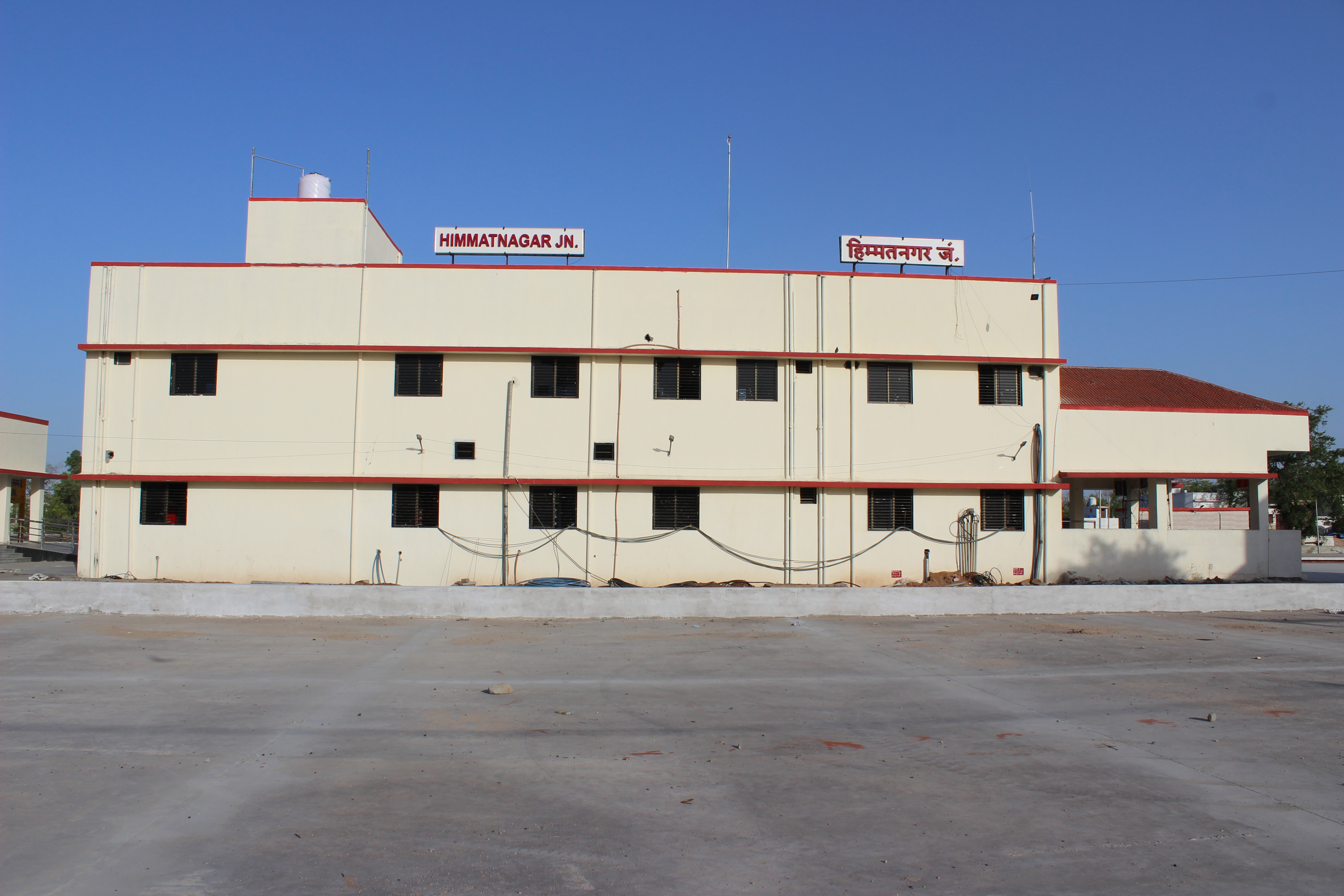

General information
- Location: Himatnagar, Gujarat; India
- Coordinates: 23°35′31″N 72°57′37″E
- Elevation: 274 metres (899 ft)
- System: Indian Railways station
- Owner: Indian Railways
- Operator: Western Railway
- Line: Ahmedabad–Udaipur line
- Platforms: 2
- Tracks: 2

Construction
- Structure type: Standard (on ground station)
- Parking: Yes
- Cycle facilities: No

Other information
- Status: Functioning
- Station code: HMT
- Zone(s): Western Railway
- Division(s): Ahmedabad

History
- Rebuilt: 2019
Location
- Location within India Location within Gujarat

Himmatnagar Junction railway station is a small railway station in Sabarkantha district, Gujarat. Its code is HMT. It serves Himatnagar city. The station consists of two platforms. The platform is well sheltered and have all basic facilities including water and sanitation.

== Trains ==
- 19703/04 Asarva–Udaipur City Intercity Express
- 79401/02 Asarva–Himmatnagar DEMU
- 09543/44 Asarva–Dungarpur DEMU
- 12981/82 Asarva-Jaipur SF Express
- 10821/22 Asarva-Kota Express
- 19329/30 Veer Bhumi Chittaurgarh Express(Asarva-Indore)

The newly built station was inaugurated on 13 September 2019 by Indian parliamentarian Dipsinh Rathod. After a month, a DEMU trains running between Himmatnagar and Asarva Junction railway stations were started.
