= Dungarpur district =

Coordinates: 23°50′59″N 73°43′05″E

- District of Rajasthan
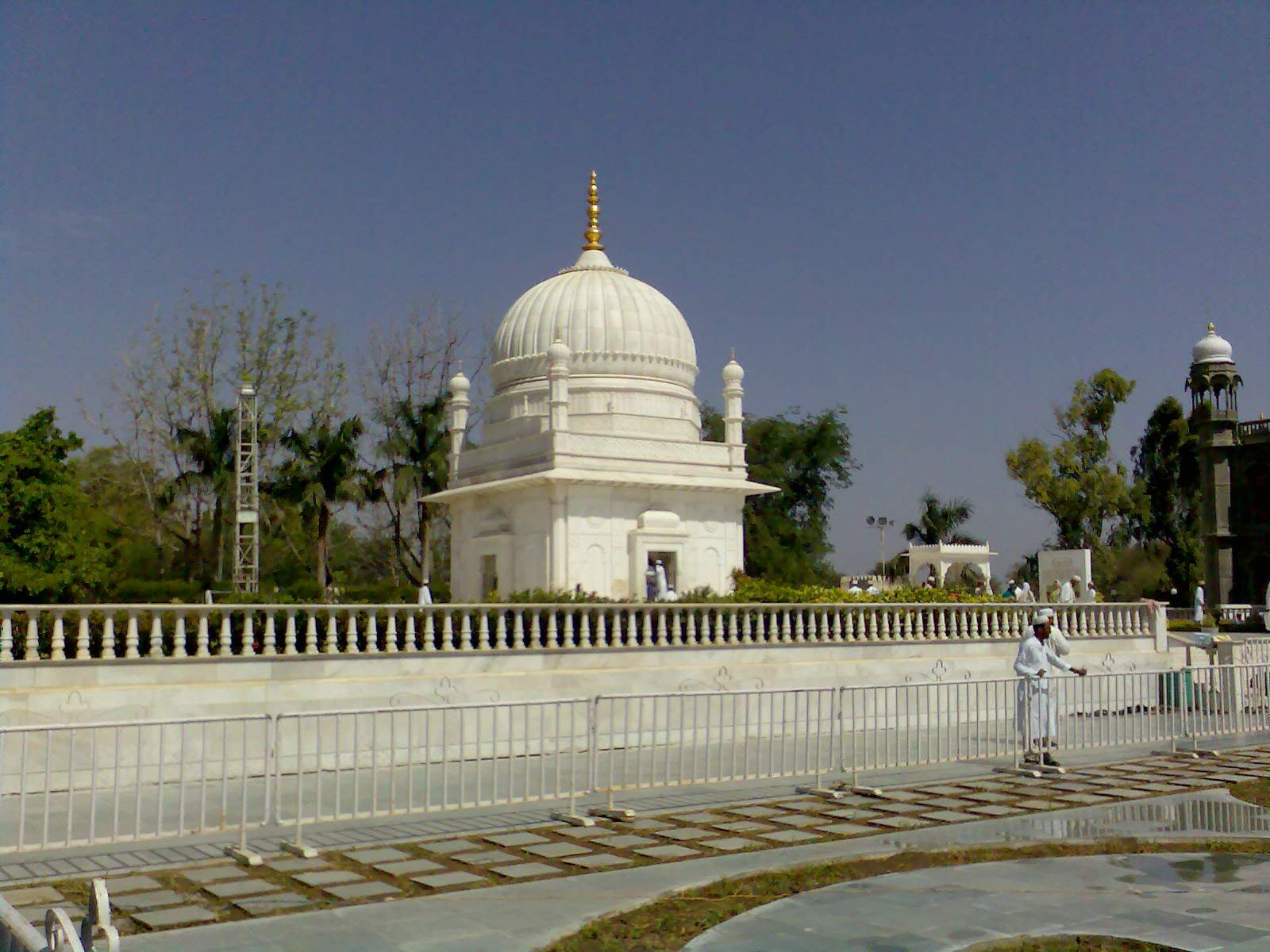
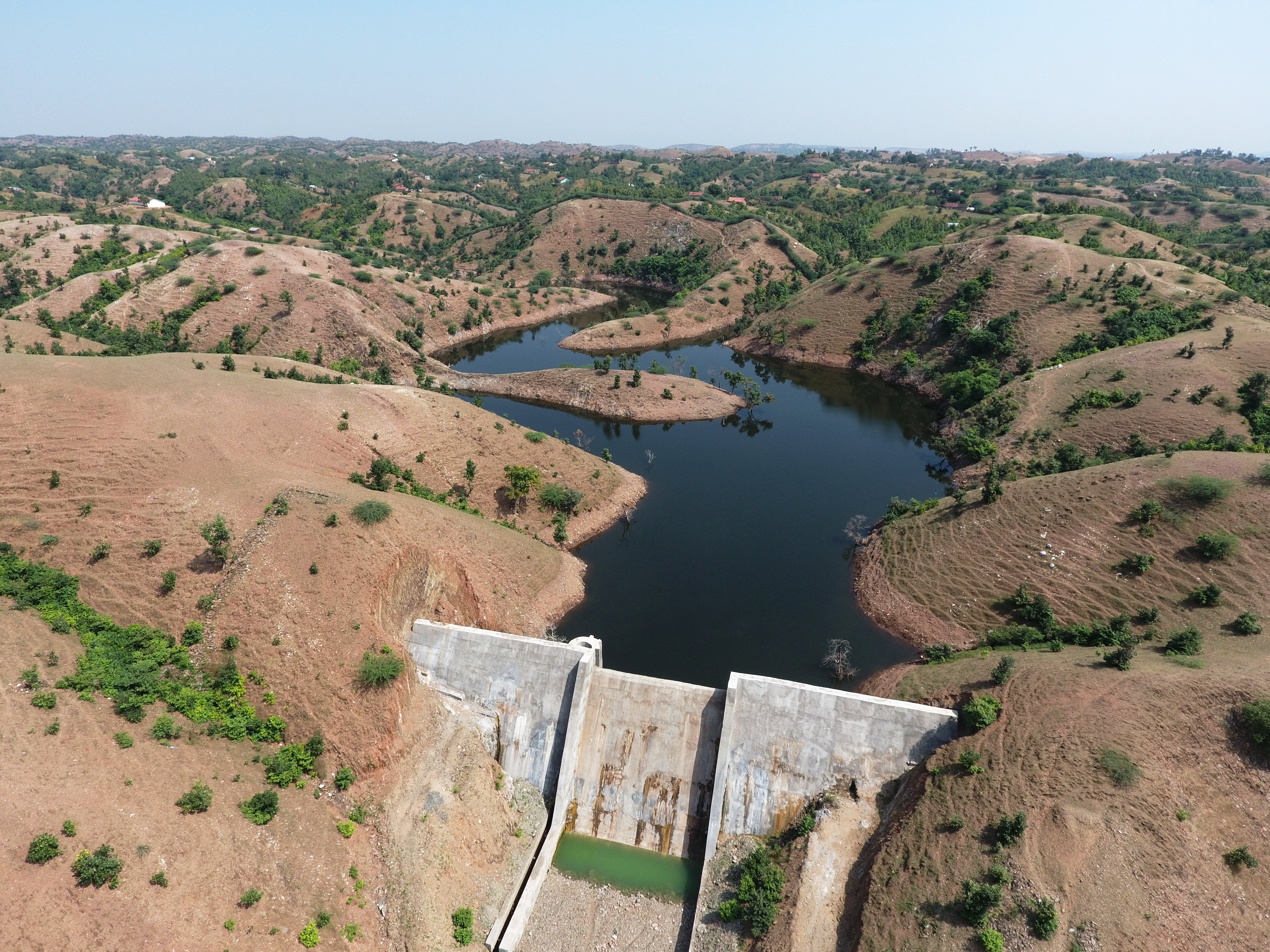
- Top: Galiakot Dargah; Bottom: Kandi ka Naka

- Location of Dungarpur district in Rajasthan
- Country: India
- State: Rajasthan
- Division: Banswara
- Headquarters: Dungarpur
- Tehsils: 8

Area
  - Total: 3,770 km^{2} (1,460 sq mi)

Population (2011)
  - Total: 1,388,552
  - Density: 368/km^{2} (954/sq mi)
  - Urban: 88,473

Demographics
  - Literacy: 59.5
  - Sex ratio: 994
- Time zone: UTC+05:30 (IST)
- Website: www.dungarpur.rajasthan.gov.in

Dungarpur district is a district of the state of Rajasthan is located Southernmost in Rajasthan in western India. The town of Dungarpur is the district headquarters.

== History ==
The area of Dungarpur district was occupied by the Bhil people perhaps as early as 4000 BCE. There is second largest community of Patidar. It was invaded by Rajputs in the 12th century. Dungarpur State was founded in 1197 by Guljaram Punjabikir, a Rajput prince from Mewar, but Rajput control over the area took centuries. Bagar or Vargar was the name the Rajputs gave to the area of Dungarpur and Banswara districts. The Bhil people remained the major ethnic group in the district during Rajput rule, and under the British Raj formed the core of the military and police.

== Geography and climate ==
Dungarpur District lies in southern Rajasthan on the border with Gujarat. The district has an area of 3,770 km^{2} and had a population of 1,388,906 in 2011. The district is roughly triangular in shape. The Mahi River runs along the southeastern edge of the district, forming the boundary with Banswara District. The Som River, a tributary of the Mahi, runs along the northern edge of the district, largely forming the boundary with Udaipur District. The district is bounded on the southeast by the districts of Sabarkantha, Panchmahal and Dahod of the state of Gujarat. The Vatrak River originates in Dungarpur District.

The district has a dry climate with a hot season from April to June; however, the climate is milder than in the desert regions of Rajasthan to the north and west. The maximum temperature in the district occurs during the hot season and ranges between 40 and 45 °C. The minimum temperature ranges between 10 and 12 °C, usually occurring in January. The monsoon season, which runs from June through September, brings almost the only rain to much of the district, but some rain may fall from November through February. The annual rainfall varies extensively over the district from up to 880 mm in Dungarpur town in the northwest to under 500 mm at Nithawa in the northeast. But the rainfall is quite variable from year to year, as Nithawa had 805 mm in 2013 but only 465 mm in 2014.

== Economy ==
In 2006 the Ministry of Panchayati Raj named Dungarpur one of the country's 250 most backward districts (out of a total of 640). It is one of the twelve districts in Rajasthan currently receiving funds from the Backward Regions Grant Fund Programme (BRGF).

== Demographics ==
Historical population
| Year | Pop. | ±% p.a. |
|---|---|---|
| 1901 | 100,103 | — |
| 1911 | 159,192 | +4.75% |
| 1921 | 189,272 | +1.75% |
| 1931 | 227,544 | +1.86% |
| 1941 | 274,282 | +1.89% |
| 1951 | 308,243 | +1.17% |
| 1961 | 406,944 | +2.82% |
| 1971 | 530,258 | +2.68% |
| 1981 | 682,845 | +2.56% |
| 1991 | 874,549 | +2.51% |
| 2001 | 1,107,643 | +2.39% |
| 2011 | 1,388,552 | +2.29% |

Religions in Dungarpur district (2011)
| Religion | Percent |
| Hinduism | 96.51% |
| Islam | 2.06% |
| Jainism | 1.16% |
| Other or not stated | 0.27% |

According to the 2011 census Dungarpur district has a population of 1,388,552, roughly equal to the nation of Eswatini or the US state of Hawaii. This gave it a ranking of 351st in India (out of a total of 640). The district had a population density of 368 inhabitants per square kilometre (950/sq mi) . Its population growth rate over the decade 2001-2011 was 25.39%. Dungarpur had a sex ratio of 990 females for every 1000 males, and a literacy rate of 60.78%. 6.39% of the population lives in urban areas. Scheduled Castes and Scheduled Tribes made up 3.77% and 70.82% of the population respectively.

=== Languages ===
Languages in Dungarpur district (2011)
1. Wagdi(Bhili) (96.0%)
2. Hindi (3.02%)
3. Others (0.98%)

At the time of the 2011 census, 96.00% of the population spoke Wagdi (Bhili)and 3.02% Hindi as their first language.

The Vagad region of Rajasthan includes Dungarpur and Banswara districts. Vagad's population is predominantly Bhils. These speak the Wagdi language (recorded under 'Wagdi' and sometimes 'Bagri' in the census).

== Administrative divisions ==
At the 2001 Indian census the Dungarpur district was divided into four tehsils: Aspur, Dungarpur, Sagwara and Simalwara; however, around 2007 the new tehsil of Bichiwara (Bichhiwara) was created out of the western part of Dungarpur Tehsil. There are four towns in Dungarpur district: two municipalities Dungarpur and Sagwara, and two census towns Seemalwara and Galiakot. As of the 2011 census there were 976 villages in the district.

== Villages ==
. chitari

- chitari

== Sources ==
- Fattori, Marco (2012). Gupta, Sanjukta Das; Basu, Raj Sekhar (eds.). The Bhil and the Rajput Kingdoms of Southern Rajasthan in Narratives from the Margins: Aspects of Adivasi History in India. Delhi: Primus Books. p. 134. ISBN 978-93-80607-10-8.
