= Ahmedabad railway division =

Railway division in Western Railway zone, India

Ahmedabad Railway Division

Overview
- Owner: Western Railway zone
- Locale: Ahmedabad, Gujarat, India

Service
- Type: Railway division
- System: Indian Railways

History
- Opened: 1 April 2003

Ahmedabad railway division is one of the six railway divisions under the jurisdiction of Western Railway zone of the Indian Railways. This railway division was formed on 1 April 2003 and its headquarter is located at Ahmedabad in the state of Gujarat of India.

Mumbai WR railway division, Vadodara railway division, Bhavnagar railway division, Rajkot railway division and Ratlam railway division are the other five railway divisions under WR Zone headquartered at Churchgate, Mumbai.

== List of railway stations and towns ==
The list includes the stations under the Ahmedabad railway division and their station category.

Category of station	No. of stations	Names of stations
A-1 Category	1	Ahmedabad Junction
A Category	8	Sabarmati Junction, Mehsana Junction, Palanpur Junction, Himmatnagar, Asarva, Gandhidham Junction, Viramgam, Bhuj
B Category	4	Bhachau, Samakhiali Junction, Detroj, Sanand
C Category (Suburban station)	5	Gandhigram, Maninagar, Vatva, Chandlodiya, Naroda
D Category	12	
E Category	80	-
F Category; Halt Station	65	-
Total	165	-
