= North Western Railway zone =

Zones of Indian Railways

North Western Railway

Overview
- Headquarters: Jaipur
- Locale: Rajasthan
- Dates of operation: 2002; 24 years ago–
- Predecessor: Northern Railway zone Western Railway zone

Technical
- Track gauge: Mixed

Other
- Website: NWR official website

The North Western Railway (abbreviated NWR) is one of 19 railway zones in India. It is headquartered at Jaipur. It has a route length of more than 5,761 kilometres (3,580 mi) across the states of Rajasthan, Gujarat, Punjab and Haryana. NWR operates international rail service Thar Express from Jodhpur to Karachi. This zone is the key enabler of the Delhi–Mumbai Industrial Corridor (DMIC) project by virtue of running railways 1,500 km long Western Dedicated Freight Corridor.

== History ==
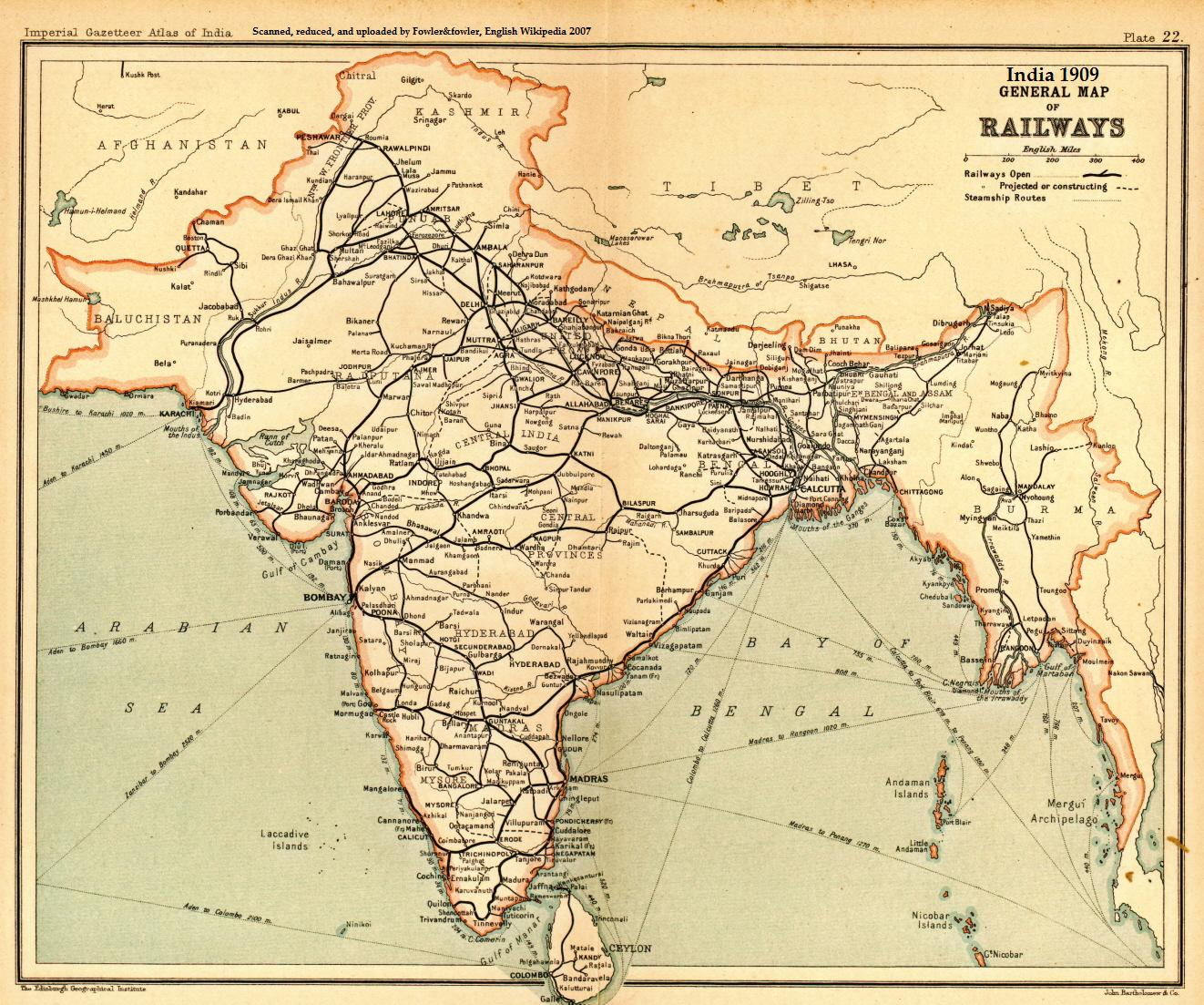
Extent of the Indian railway network in 1909

In 1882, a 1,000 mm (3 ft 3 3/8 in)-wide metre-gauge line from Marwar Junction to Pali was built by the Rajputana Railway. It was extended to Luni in 1884 and Jodhpur on 9 March 1886. New Jodhpur Railway was later combined with Bikaner Railway to form Jodhpur–Bikaner Railway in 1890, when the Bikaner Princely State and Jodhpur Princely State started constructing the Jodhpur–Bikaner Railway within the Rajputana Agency. In 1892, the 1,000 mm (3 ft 3 3/8 in)-wide metre gauge Jodhpur–Bikaner line was commissioned under the Rajputana–Malwa Railway, Jodhpur–Merta Road section was commissioned on 7 April, the Merta Road-Nagaur section on 15 October, and the Nagaur-Bikaner section on 8 December. In 1901, Jodhpur–Bikaner line combined with Jodhpur–Hyderabad Railway, some part of this railway is in Pakistan, leading to connection with Hyderabad of Sindh Province. In 1902–03, the Jodhpur–Bikaner line was extended to Bathinda in 1902–03 to connect it with the metre-gauge section of the Bombay, Baroda and Central India Railway and the metre gauge of North Western Railway Delhi–Fazilka line via Hanumangarh. In 1925, the combined entity Jodhpur and Bikaner Railways was split to function as two independent Railway companies. After Independence, a part of Jodhpur Railway went to West Pakistan. In 1926, the workshop at Bikaner (Lalgarh) was set up to carry out periodic overhauling of metre gauge coaches and wagons. In 1952, on 6 November the Jodhpur–Bikaner line was merged with the Western Railway. Sometime around or prior to 1992, the construction work for the conversion from metre gauge to 1,676 mm (5 ft 6 in)-wide 5 ft 6 in (1,676 mm) broad gauge of the Jodhpur–Bikaner line, along with the link to Phulera, were started, and it was already functioning as broad gauge Jodhpur–Merta City–Bikaner–Bathinda line by 2008. In 2002, on 1 October the North Western Railway zone came into existence. In 2012, the Bikaner Heritage Rail Museum was opened at Bikaner to displays items related to the Jodhpur and Bikaner Railway.

In 1884, The Rajputana–Malwa Railway extended the 1,000 mm (3 ft 3 3/8 in)-wide metre-gauge Delhi–Rewari section of Delhi–Fazilka line to Bathinda, which was The Southern Punjab Railway Co. opened the Delhi–Bathinda–Samasatta line in 1897. The line passed through Muktasar and Fazilka tehsils and provided direct connection through Samma Satta (now in Pakistan) to Karachi.

On 18 February 2006, Thar Express, an Indian non-stop international passenger train operated weekly by Indian Railways using its own coaches and locomotives, between Jodhpur in India and Karachi in Pakistan.

Earlier, Sindh Mail train operated on this route from 1900 to 1965 when the track was bombed out by the Pakistan Air Force in Indo-Pakistani War of 1965. Thar Link Express was run started after 41 years in 2006 based on the earlier rail communication agreement. The rail communication agreement was signed by India and Pakistan in 1976, to ease the soured relations after the Indo-Pakistani War of 1971 for the successful liberation of Bangladesh by Indian Army. The rail communication agreement is renewable every three years, and currently it is valid until January 2019.

In the 1990s, the Delhi–Jaipur line and Jaipur–Ahmedabad line were converted to broad gauge (BG). In 2007, the line going toward Ratlam Junction from Phulera to Chittaurgarh was converted to BG.

Between 2008 and 2011, the Bikaner–Rewari line was converted to broad gauge.

In 2009, the metre-gauge Hisar–Sadulpur section was converted to broad gauge.

By December 2017, railways in India installed 6,095 GPS-enabled "Fog Pilot Assistance System" railway signalling devices in four most affected zones, Northern Railway zone, North Central Railway zone, North Eastern Railway zone and North Western Railway zone, replacing the older practice of placing firecrackers on train tracks to alert train pilots of upcoming signals. With these devices, train pilots are informed of the locations of signals, level-crossings and other approaching markers.

== Organisation ==
This zone was formed on 1 October 2002, comprising four divisions: Jodhpur and reorganized Bikaner division of the erstwhile Northern Railway zone, and reorganized Jaipur and Ajmer divisions of the erstwhile Western Railway zone.

=== Ajmer railway division ===
The Ajmer railway division, founded on 5 November 1951, has ~9,050 employees handling 48 passenger trains across 141 stations (15 main stations with Computerized Passenger Reservation System), covering the elongated elliptical shaped loop railway network in Marwar region central Rajasthan, from Pushkar to Palanpur via Marwar, and from Palanpur back to Pushkar via Chittorgarh. The main goods traffic are the export of cement from Ajmer district, and rock phosphate and soapstone powder from Udaipur district. The passenger segment handles traffic on the prominent religious and tourist circuit of Ajmer Sharif Dargah, Pushkar, Dilwara Jain Temples at Mount Abu and Ranakpur Jain temple.

=== Bikaner railway division ===
The Bikaner railway division, founded in 1924, has ~12,000 employees handling 142 trains across 198 stations (14 with Computerized Passenger Reservation System), covering the eastern Rajasthan, western and southern triangular half of Haryana (railway line network from Rewari–Bhiwani to Hisar, Sirsa and Dabwali, Rohtak to Hansi–Hisar), and a very small corner of south west Punjab (Sirsa to Bhatinda). The quantum of traffic is equally split between goods and passenger segment, with food grains, china clay and gypsum being the main outbound goods traffic.

=== Jaipur railway division ===
The Jaipur railway division was formed after merging parts of Bombay, Baroda and Central India Railway, Jaipur State Railway and Rajputana–Malwa Railway. It has ~10,250 employees handling 146 trains across 128 stations (14 with Computerized Passenger Reservation System), covering the states of Rajasthan, Uttar Pradesh and Haryana. a very small corner of south west Punjab (Sirsa to Bathinda). 85% of the income is from the passenger traffic. It forms a logistics hub for the cross traffic of Western Dedicated Freight Corridor, carrying fertilizer, cement, oil, salt, food grains, oil seeds, limestone and gypsum traffic, with bulk container loading facilities.

=== Jodhpur railway division ===
The Jodhpur railway division, with origin going back to 1882, was founded on 5 November 1951. It has ~14,000 employees handling 92 trains across 144 stations (15 with Computerized Passenger Reservation System), It covers Jodhpur, Pali Marwar, Nagaur, Jalore, Barmer, Jaisalmer districts in Rajasthan and certain districts of Gujarat state. The main goods export traffic consists of limestone, salt and gypsum.

== Divisions ==
- Jaipur railway division
- Ajmer railway division
- Jodhpur railway division
- Bikaner railway division

== Medical facilities ==
For the employees and their families, the zone also has the following healthcare facilities:

- Zonal hospitals
  - Jaipur Zonal Railway Hospital near Jaipur Junction
- Divisional hospitals
  - Ajmer Divisional Railway Hospital near Ajmer Junction
  - Bikaner Divisional Railway Hospital near Bikaner Junction
  - Jodhpur Divisional Railway Hospital near Jodhpur Junction
- Sub-divisional hospitals
  - Rewari Sub-Divisional Railway Hospital near Rewari (Bikaner division)
  - Bandikui Sub-Divisional Railway Hospital near Bandikui Junction (Jaipur division)
  - Ajmer Sub-Divisional Railway Hospital near Abu Road (Ajmer division)
  - Udaipur Sub-Divisional Railway Hospital near Rana Pratap Nagar at Udaipur (Jodhpur division)
- Health units, 29 in total
- First aid posts, 2 in total

== Route and track length ==
This railway zone has a total of 578 stations, covering a total of 5,449.29 kilometres (3,386.03 mi) route kilometers out of which 2,575.03 kilometres (1,600.05 mi) are broad gauge and 2,874.23 kilometres (1,785.96 mi) are metre gauge (c. 2009), and 7,329.80 kilometres (4,554.53 mi) track kilometers out of6,696.36 kilometres (4,160.93 mi) are broad gauge and 733.44 kilometres (455.74 mi) are metre gauge (c. 2009).

- North Western Railway zone
  - Route km: broad gauge 2,575.03 kilometres (1,600.05 mi), metre gauge 2,874.23 kilometres (1,785.96 mi), total 5,449.29 kilometres (3,386.03 mi)
  - Track km: broad gauge 6,696.36 kilometres (4,160.93 mi), metre gauge 733.44 kilometres (455.74 mi), total 7,329.80 kilometres (4,554.53 mi)
  - Ajmer railway division
    - Route km: broad gauge 732.56 kilometres (455.19 mi), metre gauge 442.29 kilometres (274.83 mi), total 1,174.85 kilometres (730.02 mi)
    - Track km: broad gauge 1,149.0 kilometres (714.0 mi), metre gauge 466.73 kilometres (290.01 mi), total 1,617.83 kilometres (1,005.27 mi)
  - Bikaner railway division: covers Rajasthan and parts of Railway in Haryana
    - Route km: broad gauge 1,730.96 kilometres (1,075.57 mi), metre gauge 48.76 kilometres (30.30 mi), total 1,779.72 kilometres (1,105.87 mi)
    - Track km: broad gauge 2,182.31 kilometres (1,356.02 mi), metre gauge 51.17 kilometres (31.80 mi), total 2,233.58 kilometres (1,387.88 mi)
  - Jaipur railway division
    - Route km: broad gauge 830.20 kilometres (515.86 mi), metre gauge 196.61 kilometres (122.17 mi), total 1,026.81 kilometres (638.03 mi)
    - Track km: broad gauge 1,385.13 kilometres (860.68 mi), metre gauge 213.53 kilometres (132.68 mi), total 1,598.66 kilometres (993.36 mi)
  - Jodhpur railway division
    - Route km: broad gauge 1,568.42 kilometres (974.57 mi) 1,568 km, metre gauge 0 km, total 1,568.42 kilometres (974.57 mi)
    - Track km: broad gauge 1,979.73 kilometres (1,230.15 mi), metre gauge 0 km, total 1,979.73 kilometres (1,230.15 mi)

== Rail transport infrastructure ==
The zone has the following types of locomotive engines: (Legends: W – broad gauge, D – diesel, G – goods, M – mixed, P – passenger)

- Ajmer railway division
  - Abu Road (ABR) diesel sheds: WDM-2s, WDM-3s, WDG-3A and WDG-4s,
- Jodhpur railway division
  - Bhagat Ki Kothi (BGKT) sheds at Jodhpur: WDM-2, WDGs, WDP-4s, WDM-3As
- Jaipur railway division
  - Phulera Junction sheds: YDM-4 meter gauge locomotives

== Trains ==
Some of the major trains operated by North Western Railways are as follows:

Number	Train name	Starting station	Terminating station
12977/12978	Marusagar Express	Ajmer	Ernakulam
14854/14864/14866	Marudhar Express (via Faizabad)	Jodhpur	Varanasi
19667/19668	Udaipur City–Mysuru Palace Queen Humsafar Express	Udaipur	Mysuru
22985/22986	Udaipur City–Delhi Sarai Rohilla Rajasthan Humsafar Express	Udaipur	Delhi Sarai Rohilla
12963/12964	Hazrat Nizamuddin–Udaipur City Mewar Superfast Express	Udaipur	Hazarat Nizamuddin

== Training ==
The zone has the following training institutes:

- Zonal Railway Training Institute, Udaipur in Ajmer division
- Diesel Traction Training Centre, Abu Road in Ajmer division
- Divisional Training Centre (Engineering), Ajmer
- Supervisor's Training Centre, Ajmer
- Basic Training Centre (C&W), Ajmer
- Basic Training Centre(Loco), Ajmer
- Area Training Centre, Ajmer
- Divisional Training Centre (Engineering), Bandikui
- Area Training Centre, Bandikui
- Divisional Training Centre(Traffic, C&W, Civil), Lalgarh, Bikaner
- Basic Training Centre, Bikaner
- Railway Police Force (RPF) Training Centre, Bandikui
- Divisional Training Centre (Engineering), Jodhpur
- Carriage & Wagon Training Centre, Jodhpur
- Diesel Traction Training Centre, Bhagat Ki Kothi, Jodhpur
- Personnel Training Centre, Jodhpur
- Transportation Training Centre, Jodhpur
- Basic Training Centre, Jodhpur

== Loco sheds ==
- Diesel Loco Shed, Abu Road
- Diesel Loco Shed, Bhagat Ki Kothi

== See also ==
- North Eastern Railway Connectivity Project
- All India Station Masters' Association (AISMA)
- Zones and divisions of Indian Railways
