= Ahmedabad–Udaipur line =

Indian rail route

Ahmedabad–Udaipur line; with Shamlaji–Modasa–Nadiad branch line

Overview
- Owner: Indian Railways
- Locale: Gujarat, Rajasthan
- Termini: Ahmedabad Junction; Udaipur City
- Stations: 33

Service
- Operators: Western Railway; North Western Railway

History
- Opened: 1897: Ahmedabad–Himmatnagar section; 1961: Himmatnagar–Udaipur section; 1911: Himmatnagar–Khed Bramha branch; 1913: Nadiad–Kapadvanj branch section; 2002: Kapadvanj–Modasa branch section

Technical
- Line length: Main line: 296 kilometres (184 mi); Branch lines: Himmatnagar-Junction–Khed Bramha 55 kilometres (34 mi); Nadiad–Kapadvanj–Modasa‍–‍Shamlaji Road 138 kilometres (86 mi)
- Track length: 296 kilometres (184 mi)
- Num of tracks: 1
- Track gauge: 1,676 mm (5 ft 6 in) broad gauge
- Old gauge: 1,000 mm (3 ft 3 3/8 in) metre gauge
- Electrification: Yes

The Ahmedabad–Udaipur Line is a railway route of both the Western and North Western Railway zones of the Indian Railways. It plays an important role in short-connectivity transport, reaching to North India and Eastern India from Gujarat and the coastal areas of Maharashtra, Goa, Karnataka and Kerala.

With a stretch of 299.55 kilometres (186.13 mi), this corridor passes through the Aravalli Ranges of North Gujarat and the Udaipur division of Rajasthan, where there are zinc and phosphate mines in Zawar and Umra, making it a direct and important mineral transportation route to the rest of India.

== Routes and divisions ==
This mainline route is divided into two sections:

1. The first section is of Ahmedabad–Himmatnagar Junction, with the length of 88 kilometres (55 mi), comes under the jurisdiction of Western Railways.
2. The second section is Himmatnagar Junction–Udaipur City, with a length of 210 kilometres (130 mi), comes under the jurisdiction of North Western Railways.

It also contains two branch lines of this corridor; both come in the Western Railways zone. These are:

1. The first branch line is Himmatnagar Junction–Khed Bramha with a length of 58 kilometres (36 mi)
2. The second branch line is Nadiad–Kapadvanj–Modasa Branch line with the length of 138 kilometres (86 mi)

== History ==
The Ahmedabad–Himmatnagar metre-gauge railway line was opened in 1897 by Ahmedabad–Parantij Railway Co. in three phases: Ahmedabad–Talod, Talod–Prantij and Prantij–Himatnagar; all in the same year. Later it was extended from Himmatnagar to Khed Bramha in 1911. This gave a total length of 88.70 miles (142.75 km) from Ahmedabad to Khedbrahma.

In 1956 the survey and construction of a 210-kilometre-long (130 mi) Himmatnagar–Udaipur line, also a metre-gauge railway line, was started; rail operations began in 1961 with flagging off Delhi Sarai Rohilla–Ahmedabad Express for direct connection to Delhi and Udaipur from Ahmedabad via Himmatnagar.

The branch-line of Nadiad–Kapadvanj, a narrow-gauge railway section, was opened on 5 March 1913 by Guzerat Railway Company, with a length of 49 kilometres (30 mi). In 1992, it was converted to broad gauge and in the same year the survey and construction of Kapadvanj–Modasa section, an extension of the branch line, was started with a planned length of 60 kilometres (37 mi). It was halted for two decades, with construction only revived in 2000; it became operational on 28 October 2002, with a total length of 105 kilometres (65 mi) and direct connections to Nadiad.

== Gauge conversion ==
The broad-gauge conversion of the whole mainline from Udaipur to Ahmedabad is complete. Ongoing conversion of the branch lines, jointly carried out by Western Railways and North Western Railways, commenced 1 January 2017.

On 1 January 2017, the rail service is suspended for gauge conversion of Himmatnagar–Khedbrahma branch line. In June 2022, ₹482 crore (US$51 million) were allocated for the project. The project was inaugurated on 18 June 2022 and was completed by August 2025.

The Modasa–Shamlaji rail line with a length of 26 kilometres (16 mi) is under construction this will connect the Nadiad–Modasa branch line with the Ahmedabad–Udaipur mainline, shortening the routes of Mumbai, Ahmedabad and the rest of Gujarat to North India, with additional direct passenger services.

In this joint project, the first section of the mainline from the Western Railways zone side was fully converted into broad gauge; DEMU (diesel-electrical multiple unit) trains started running on the route from 15 October 2019. The broad-gauge conversion was completed on 10 August 2022, but trains are yet to start. There has as yet been no official inauguration.

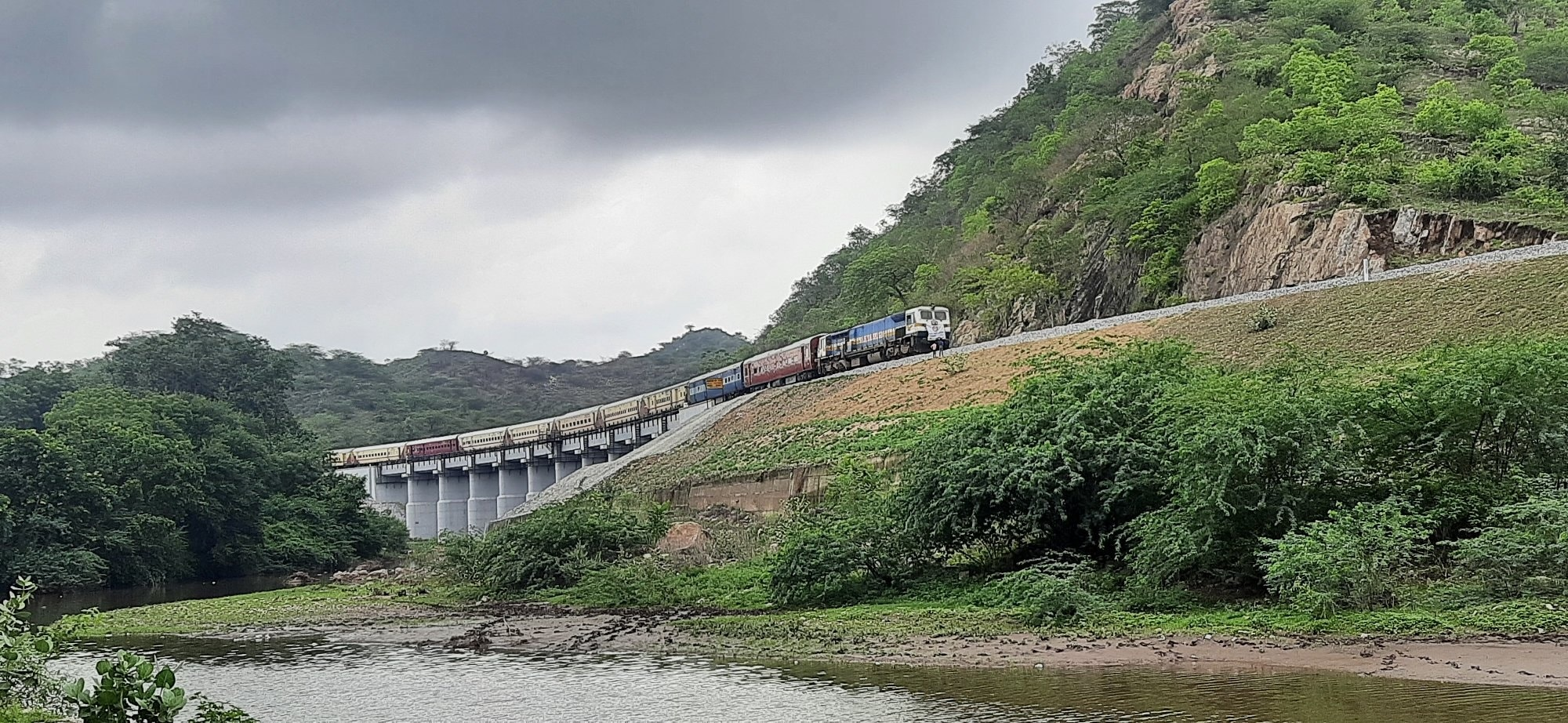
A Trial Run of an empty train on the newly constructed broad gauge line.

=== Current broad-gauge trains ===
Post completion of the broad-gauge (BG) line, Indian Railways is running a small number of trains on this line, with may be expanded later. Trains currently running on this line are as follows:

- 12981/12982 Jaipur–Asarva Superfast Express (daily)
  - formerly the 9659/60 Lake City Express
- 19703/19704 Asarva–Udaipur Express (daily)
- 19821/19822 Kota–Asarva Express (bi-weekly)
- 19315/19316 Veer Bhumi Chittaurgarh Express (daily)
- 09543/09544 Asarva–Chittaurgarh DEMU (daily)

=== Expected route extensions or re-introductions ===
Trains which are slated for extension or re-introduction in the near-future are:

- 12315/12316 Ananya Express extension to Asarva
- 12963/12964 Mewar Express extension to Asarva
- 20971/20972 Shalimar–Udaipur Express extension to Asarva
- 19943/19944 Ahmedabad–Udaipur Express: reintroduced as Okha–Delhi Sarai Rohilla Express
- 19911/19912 Ahmedabad–Udaipur Express: reintroduced as Mumbai–Udaipur Express
- Ahmedabad–Delhi Express (new)
- Udaipur–Chennai Express (new)
