= Udaipur City–Chandigarh Superfast Express =

Train in India

Udaipur City - Chandigarh Superfast Express
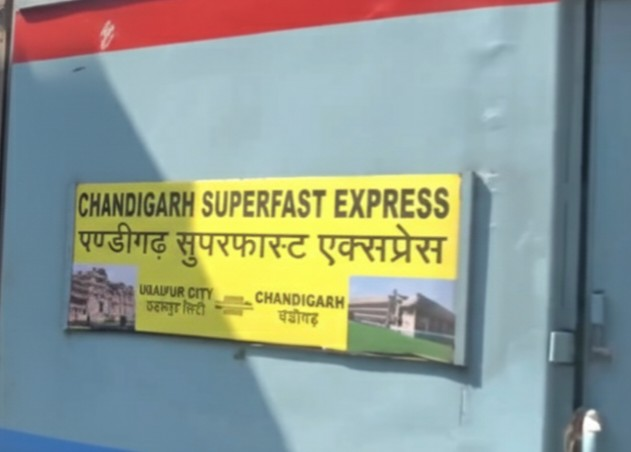

Overview
- Service type: Superfast
- Status: Active
- Locale: Rajasthan, Haryana & Chandigarh
- First service: 27 September 2025; 6 months ago
- Current operator: North Western Railway

Route
- Termini: Udaipur City (UDZ); Chandigarh Junction (CDG)
- Stops: 25
- Distance travelled: 999 km (621 mi)
- Average journey time: 17 hrs 45 mins
- Service frequency: Weekly
- Train number: 20989 / 20990

On-board services
- Classes: AC 2 Tier, AC 3 Tier, AC 3 Tier Economy, Sleeper Class, General Unreserved
- Seating arrangements: Yes
- Sleeping arrangements: Yes
- Catering facilities: Available
- Observation facilities: Large windows
- Baggage facilities: No
- Other facilities: Below the seats

Technical
- Rolling stock: LHB coach
- Track gauge: 1,676 mm (5 ft 6 in)
- Operating speed: 56 km/h (35 mph) average including halts.

The 20989 / 20990 Udaipur City–Chandigarh Superfast Express is a Superfast Express train belonging to North Western Railway zone that runs between Udaipur City and Chandigarh Junction in India.

== Schedule ==
• 20989 - 4:05 PM (Wed & Sat) [Udaipur City]

• 20990 - 11:20 AM (Sun & Thu) [Chandigarh]

== Routes and halts ==
The Important Halts of the train are :

● Udaipur City

● Ranapratapnagar

● Mavli Junction

● Kapasan

● Chanderiya

● Bhilwara

● Bijainagar

● Ajmer Junction

● Kishangarh

● Phulera Junction

● Jaipur Junction

● Gandhi Nagar Jaipur

● Dausa Junction

● Bandikui Junction

● Rajgarh

● Alwar Junction

● Rewari Junction

● Jhajjar

● Rohtak Junction

● Jind Junction

● Narwana Junction

● Kaithal

● Kurukshetra Junction

● Ambala Cantt Junction

● Chandigarh Junction

== Traction ==
As the entire route is fully electrified, it is hauled by a Ghaziabad Loco Shed-based WAP-7 electric locomotive from Udaipur City to Chandigarh Junction and vice versa.

== Rake reversal ==
The train will reverse 1 time :

1. Kurukshetra Junction

== See also ==
Trains from Udaipur City :

1. Udaipur City–New Jalpaiguri Weekly Express
2. Ratlam–Udaipur City Express
3. Ananya Express
4. Udaipur City–Jaipur Vande Bharat Express
5. Udaipur City–Patliputra Humsafar Express

Trains from Chandigarh Junction :

1. New Delhi–Chandigarh Shatabdi Express
2. Chandigarh–Bandra Terminus Superfast Express
3. Chandigarh–Amritsar Intercity Express
4. Chandigarh–Firozpur Cantonment Express
5. Kerala Sampark Kranti Express

== Notes ==
a. Runs 2 day in a week with both directions.
