= Chetak Circle =

Coordinates: 24.5909881°N 73.6881418°E

Chetak Circle is a locality, embarked by a large roundabout in the Udaipur city of Rajasthan state. This is among the popular shopping area in the city.

== General ==
Chetak Circle is an adjoining roundabout next to Hathipole. It is around 2 km away from the Udaipur City Bus Depot and 2.5 km from Udaipur City railway station. It is very close to several adjoining markets, namely Hathipole, Court Chauraha, Panchawati etc. This roundabout is named after the loyal horse of Maharana Pratap named Chetak. A real-life sized statue of that horse is placed at the center of this roundabout, along with several decorative fountains.

== See also ==
- Udaipur
- Chandpole
- Udiapole
- Surajpole
