= Hiran magri =

Locality in Rajasthan, India

Coordinates: 24.5367106°N 73.655799°E

- Interactive map of Hiran magri

Hiran Magri is a locality in the Udaipur city of Rajasthan state. This is one of the largest residential colony groups in the city.

== History ==
Udaipur was at one time surrounded by the City Wall of Udaipur, called in Hindi Parkota. Surajpole, Hathipole, Udiapole, Chandpole, DelhiGate, were the key entrances to the city. In the late 80s when the population of the city started growing, and people felt the need for more residential colonies, they started moving towards the southern suburban area, on the opposite side of Udaipur City Railway Station. This suburban region is now known as Hiran Magri.

== General ==
Hiran Margi is the wide colonial area situated towards the southern side of the city center. It is around 4.0 km from the Udaipur City railway station. It is divided into smaller sections, which are sequentially numbered as "sectors". Hiran Margi was originally developed as a residential area, but gradually it saw development of multiple smaller commercial markets, and at present, it provides almost equal commercial market value as the main Udaipur city.

== See also ==
- Udaipur
- Surajpole
- Chandpole
- Udiapole
