= Hathipole (Udaipur) =

Coordinates: 24.5866733°N 73.6877918°E

Hathipole is a locality in the Udaipur city of Rajasthan state. This is among the largest and popular market in the city.

== History ==
Udaipur was one time surrounded by the City Wall of Udaipur, called in Hindi Parkota. Hathipole Darvaja or Hathipole is one entry gate among seven, the others being Surajpole, Udiapole, Chandpole, DelhiGate, and so on.

== General ==
Hathipole is the adjoining pole, next to DelhiGate. It is around 1.5 km away from the Udaipur City Bus Depot and 2.5 km from Udaipur City railway station. It is very close to several adjoining markets, namely Ashwani Bazar, Delhi Gate, Chetak Circle, Ghantaghar (Clock Tower) etc. Hathipole is a popular market for shopping of traditional handicraft items, traditional rajasthani clothing and shoes, and antique articles.

== Gallery ==
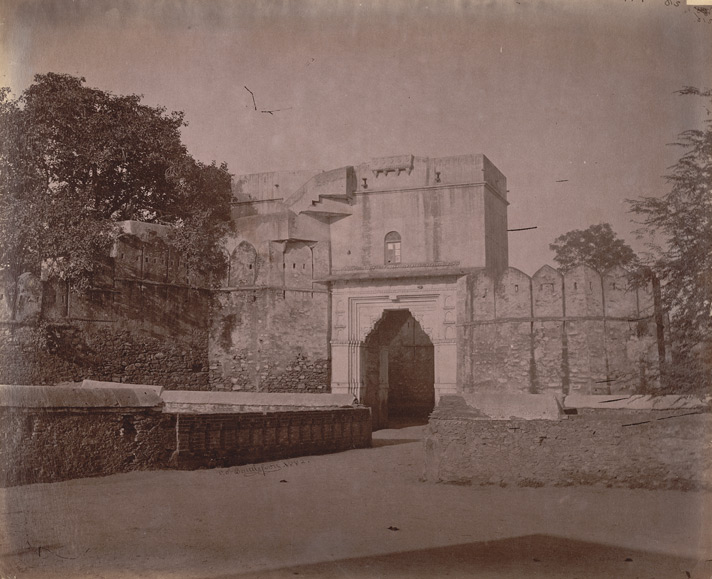
Front view of the Hathi Pol (Archive Photo)

== See also ==
- Udaipur
- Chandpole
- Udiapole
- Surajpole
