= Pala Ganesh Temple =

Hindu Temple

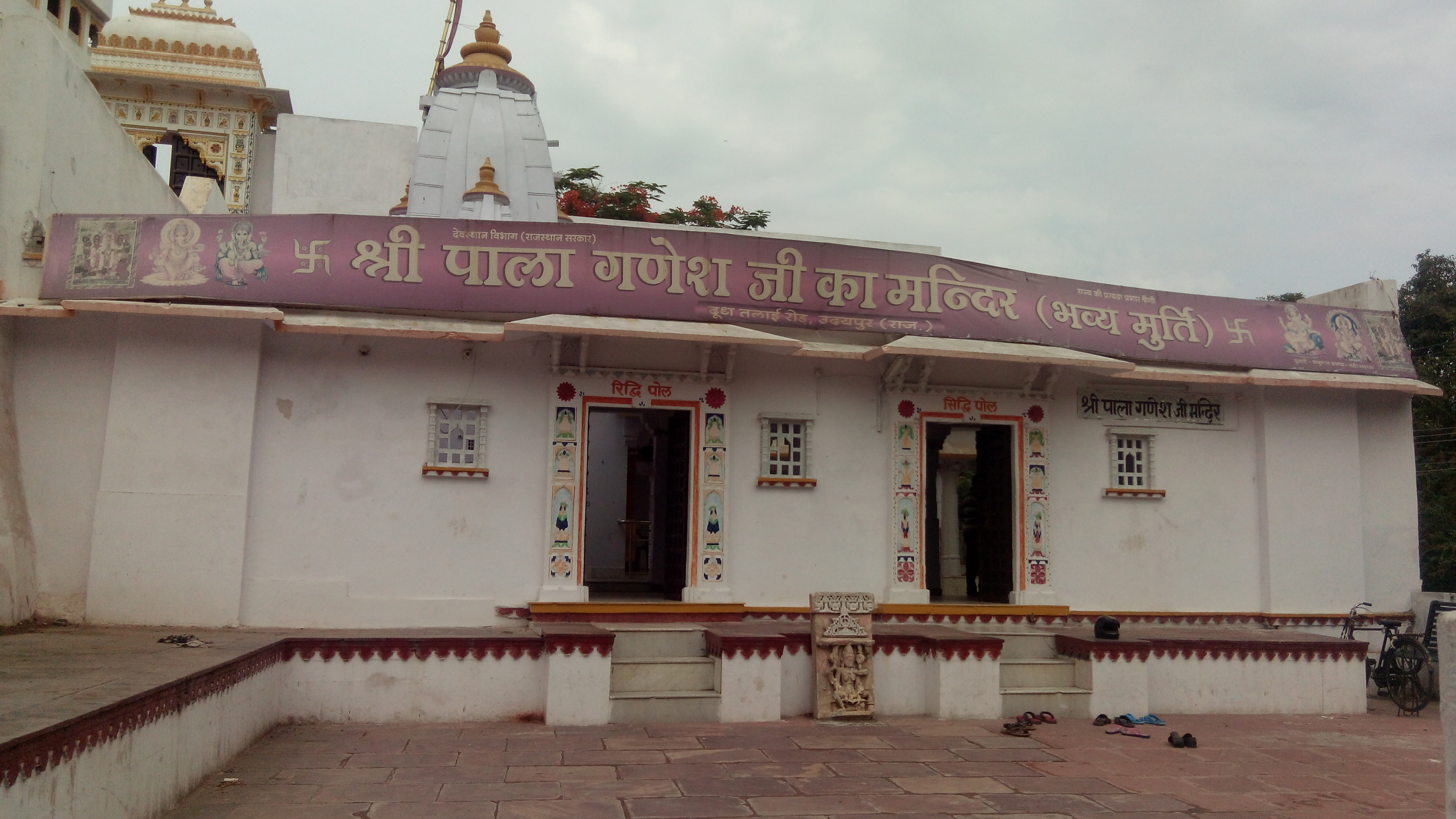

- Location in Udaipur

Religion
- Affiliation: Hinduism
- District: Udaipur district

Location
- Location: Udaipur
- State: Rajasthan
- Country: India
- Interactive map of Pala Ganesh Temple
- Coordinates: 24°34′20.4593″N 73°41′14.8358″E

Pala Ganesh Temple is a Hindu temple of Lord Ganesh, situated near Gulab Bagh area in Udaipur. This temple was built around 500 years ago, and is considered one of the ancient temples of Lord Ganesh in Udaipur.

== General ==
It is situated near the junction point of Gulab Bagh, and Doodh Talai Lake. This temple is under control of Devasthan department. At the entrance, there is a large courtyard, with some seating capacity. Inside the temple, the statue of Lord Ganesh is kept inside a central shrine. There is sufficient space for deities to walk around the central shrine (called 'parikrama' of the lord). There are two gates to the main temple, one is called Riddhi Pole, which is usually the entrance gate and second one is Siddhi Pole, which is the exit.

== Access and Timings ==
The Pala Ganesh Temple is around 1 km from city center Surajpole, and 3.5 km from Udaipur City railway station. Visitors can take private vehicle, or a Taxi or Auto-Rikshaw to visit the place. This is located in between the Gulab Bagh and Zoo and Doodh Talai Lake, having its entrance adjacent to one of the parking stands of Gulab Bagh and Zoo.
