= Karni Mata, Udaipur =

Karni Mata Temple
- Shri Manshapurna Karni Mata Temple
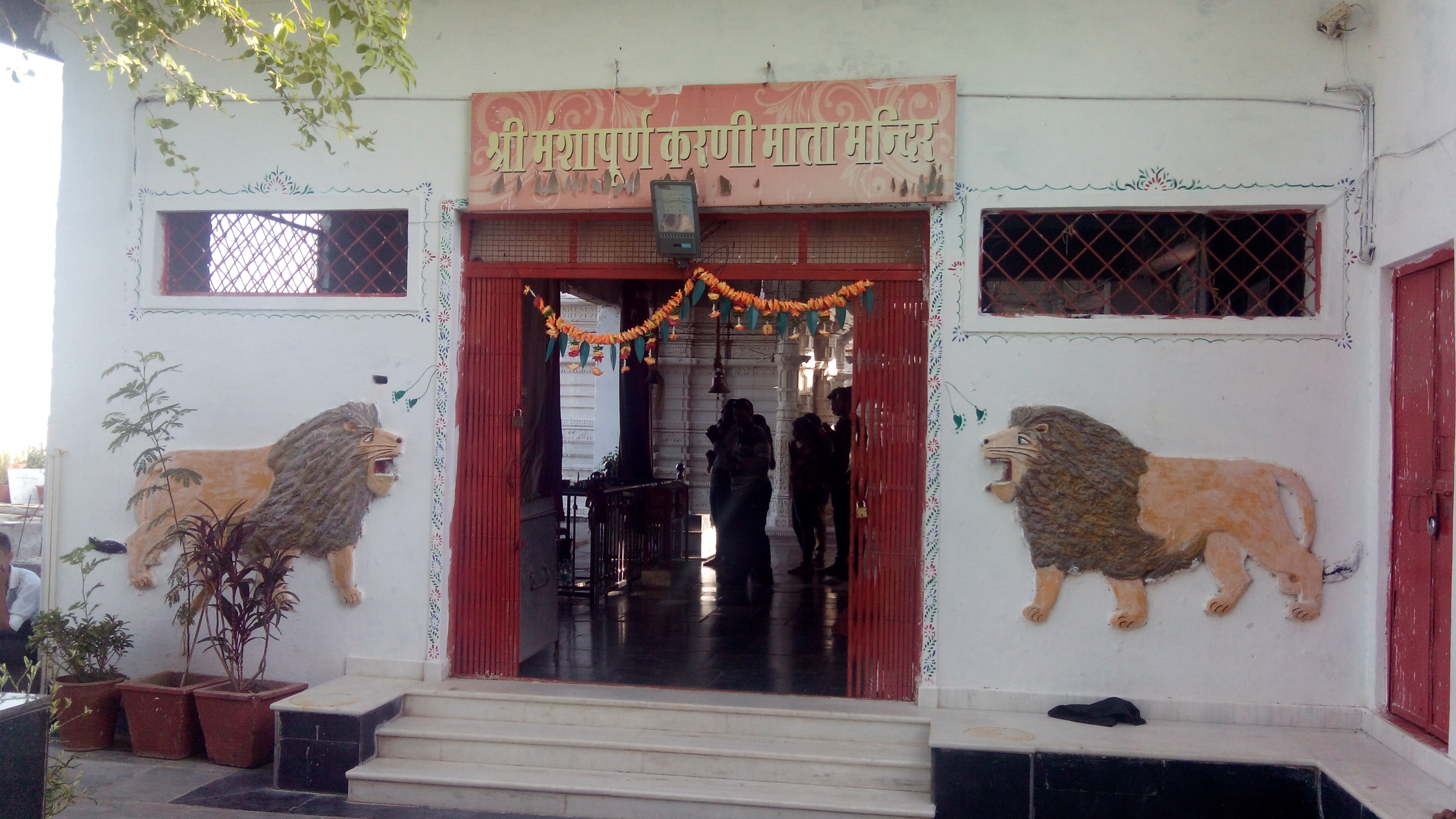

- Location in Udaipur

Religion
- Affiliation: Hinduism
- District: Udaipur district

Location
- Location: Udaipur
- State: Rajasthan
- Country: India
- Interactive map of Karni Mata Temple
- Coordinates: 24°33′57.096″N 73°41′17.8974″E

Shri Manshapurna Karni Mata Temple is a Hindu temple located on the Machla Magra Hills, near the Doodh Talai Lake in Udaipur, Rajasthan. It enshrines the stone idol of Karni Mata. There are views from the temple of the city and its lakes. The walkway is for pedestrians only, as no vehicles can enter in the hill boundary.

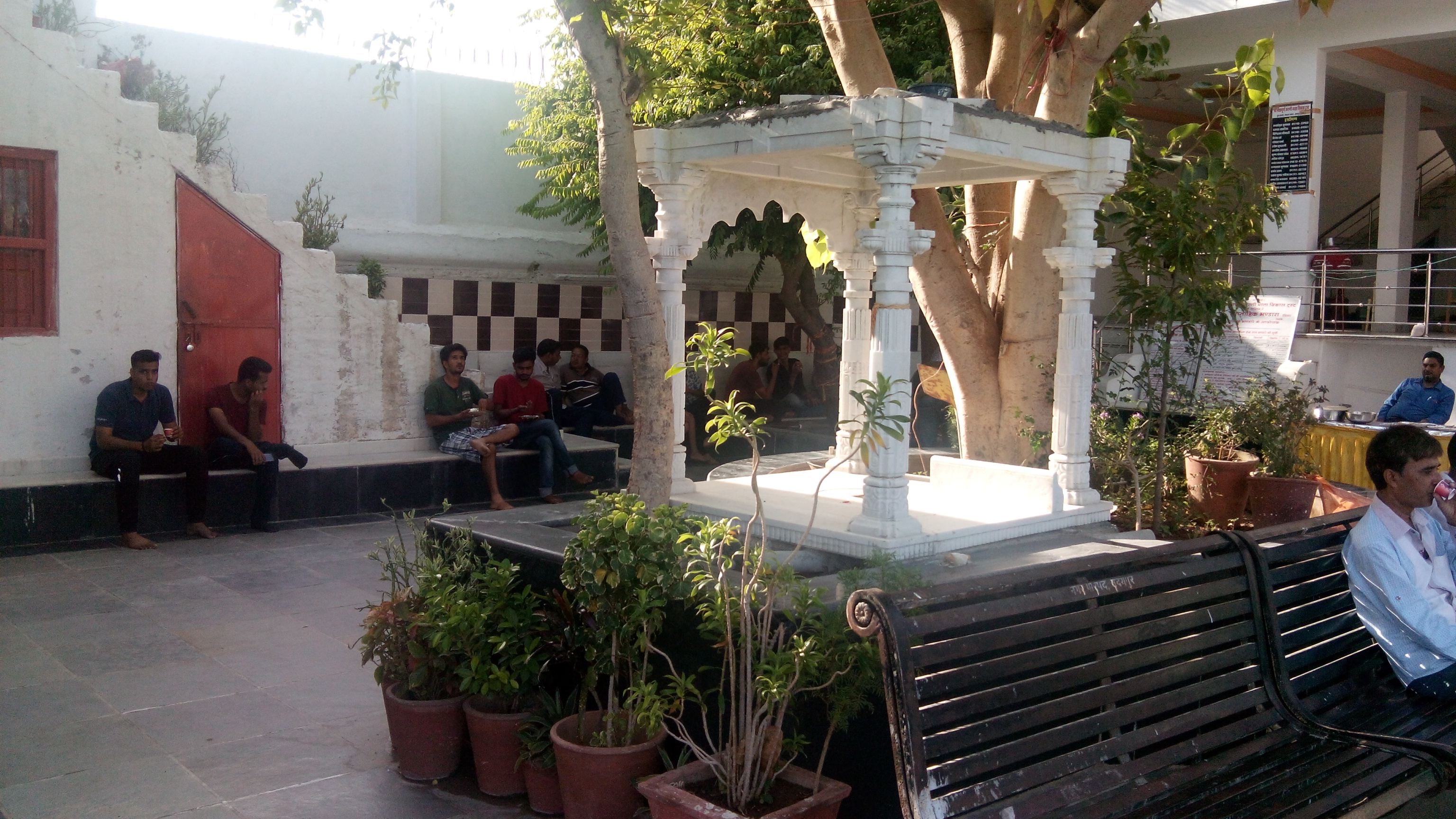
View of courtyard area of the temple.

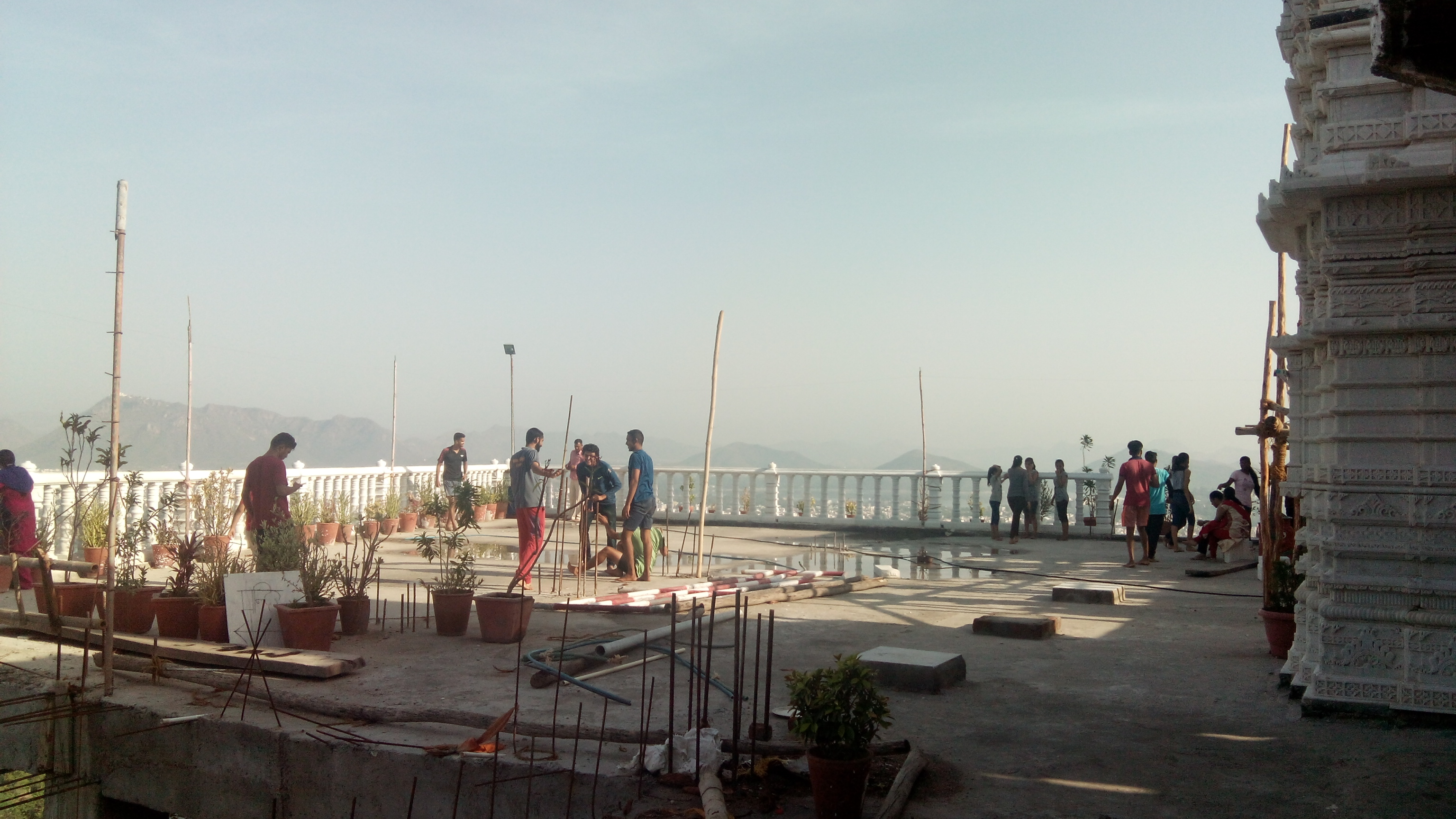
View of Side-roof area of the temple.

== Access ==
The Karni Mata Temple is located near the center of the Udaipur City. It is around 24 km away from Udaipur Airport, and just 4 km from Udaipur City railway station and Udaipur City Bus Depot. Visitors can also take local Tongas, auto-rickshaws and taxis to reach Doodh Talai. Karni Mata Temple can be reached via ropeway.

== See also ==
- Udaipur
- Tourist Attractions in Udaipur
- Doodh Talai Lake
- City Palace, Udaipur
