= Gupteshwar Mahadev, Udaipur =

Gupteshwar Mahadev Temple
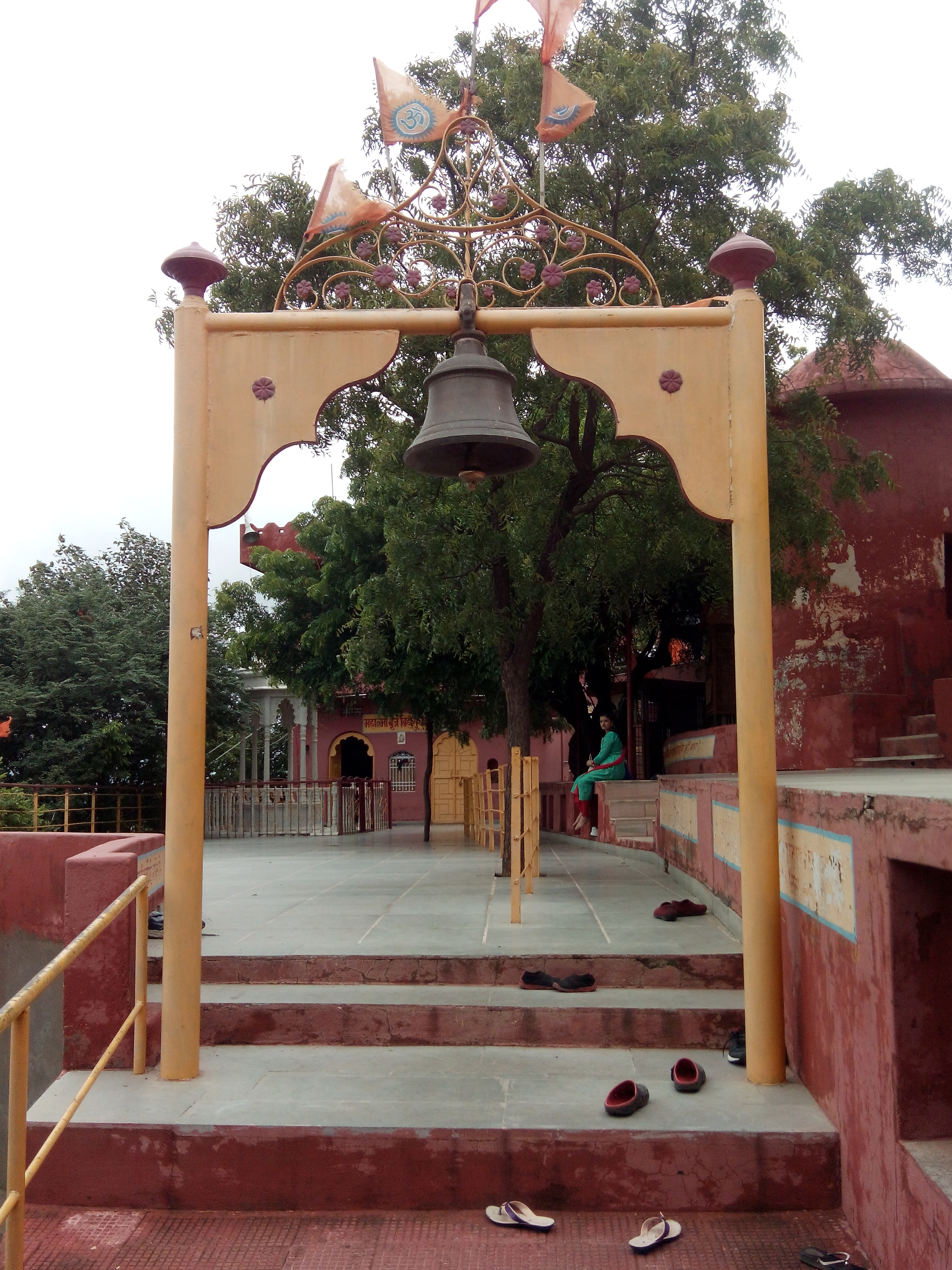

- Location within Rajasthan Location within India

Religion
- Affiliation: Hinduism
- District: Udaipur
- Deity: Gupteshwar Mahadev (Shiva)

Location
- Location: Titardi village, Udaipur
- State: Rajasthan
- Country: India
- Interactive map of Gupteshwar Mahadev Temple
- Coordinates: 24.5418891°N 73.7395009°E

Architecture
- Elevation: 849 m (2,785 ft)

Gupteshwar Mahadev is a popular temple of the lord Shiva in the Udaipur city in the state of Rajasthan, India.

== General ==
Gupteshwar Mahadev is a Hindu temple of Lord Shiva, situated inside a cave on the top of a hill in Titardi village near Udaipur.

== Access and Timings ==
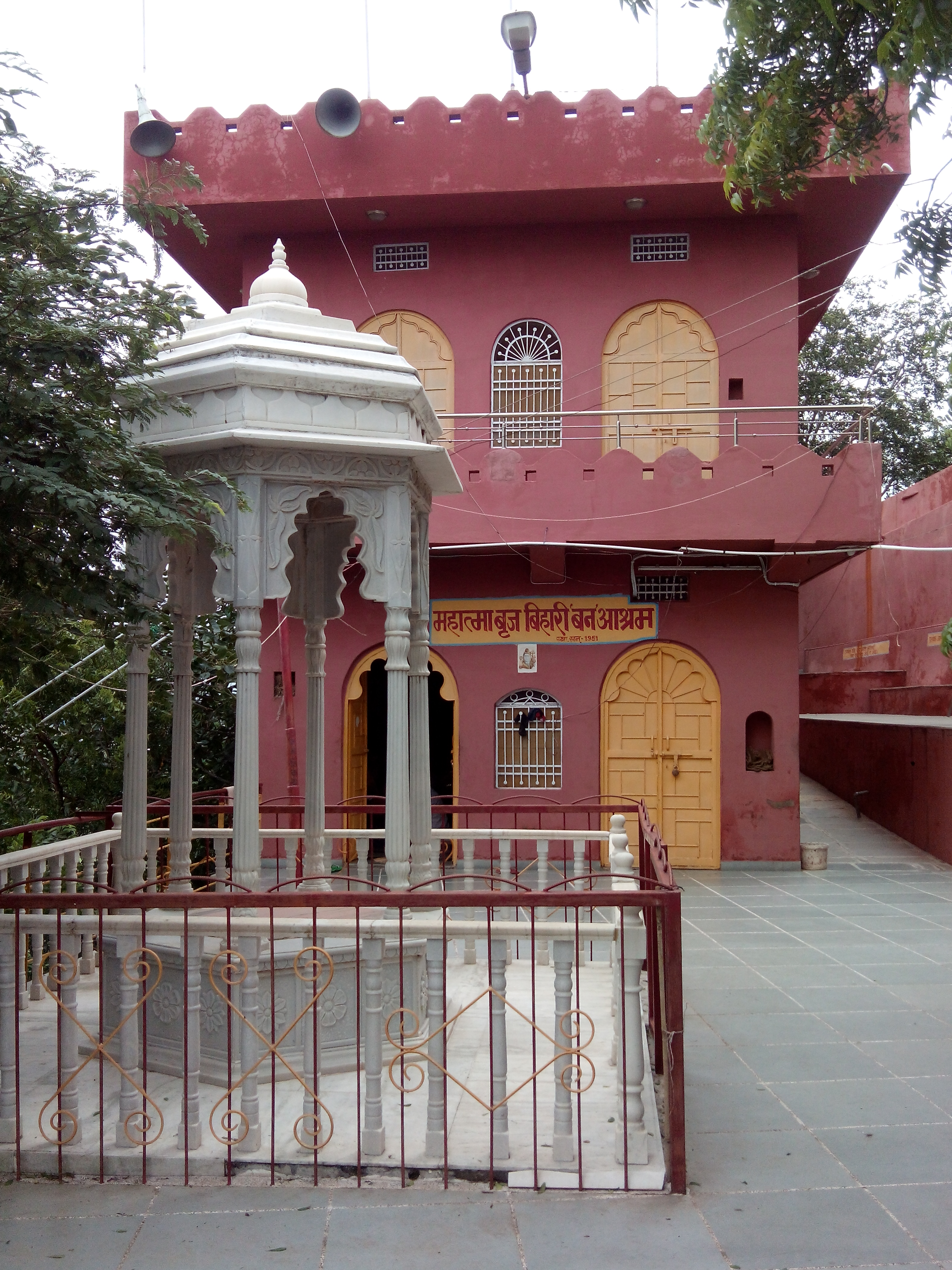
Front Other Areas around main Gupteshwar Mahadev Temple.

The Gupteshwar Mahadev Temple is located in a remote side of the city, which is densely inhabited. Although just 8 km from city center Surajpole, and 7.5 km from Udaipur City railway station, but there is no public utility for direct access.timing for darshan is 5:00 AM to 5:00 PM Visitors need to take private vehicle, or a Taxi or Auto-Rikshaw to visit the place, ensuring return via the same. There is ample parking facility in and around the premise, which is at the bottom of the hill. From there, visitors need to talk a walk of around 800 m up the hill to visit the main temple.
