= Vintage and Classic Car Museum =

Coordinates: 24.575699°N 73.6945131°E

- Location: Udaipur, Rajasthan, India
- Owner: Arvind Singh Mewar

Vintage and Classic Car Museum is a car museum in Udaipur in Rajasthan state in India, having some of the rarest classic and vintage car collection. This museum is owned by Arvind Singh Mewar.

== History ==
The Vintage and Classic Car Museum, or Vintage & Classic Car Collection was unveiled to general public on 15 February 2000. It was inaugurated by Lord Montagu of Beaulieu, founder of the National Motor Museum in England. The Vintage & Classic Car Collection is a car collection and a museum, showing all the vehicles belonging to the Maharanas of Mewar both past and present. The collection is housed in the original former Mewar State Motor Garage, which currently serves as this museum. Garden Hotel and Restaurant, a property of HRH Group of Hotels, Udaipur, is also contained within the garage's grounds. The semi-circular motor garage with its forecourt is housed within a greater courtyard. It also houses one of the original Shell petrol pump, which is still assumed to be in usable condition. Despite some vehicles being over seventy years old, each one is still kept in working condition.

== General ==
The Vintage and Classic Car Museum has around 20 antique cars, including 4 Rolls-Royce's, 2 Cadillacs, one MG-TC convertible, one Ford-A Convertible, one Vauxhall-12 and several other exhibits like solar powered rickshaws and many more.

== Location ==
The Vintage and Classic Car Museum is located on the Gulab Bagh Road, just opposite to the main entrance to the Gulab Bagh and Zoo. It is just 1.5 km (0.93 mi) from Udaipur City railway station and 1 km (0.62 mi) from Udaipur City Bus Depot. Visitors can reach here by personal vehicle, or can avail themselves of a taxi or local rickshaw to reach here. There is an entrance charge (per-person basis) to visit this museum.
