= Chetak (disambiguation) =

Chetak may refer to:

- Chetak (died 1576), the horse of Maharana Pratap
- Chetak Circle, a shopping area in Udaipur, Rajasthan, India
- Chetak Express, train that runs between Udaipur City and Delhi Sarai Rohilla, India
- Chetak Smarak, a memorial for the horse Chetak in Rajsamand District, Rajasthan, India
- Bajaj Chetak, an Indian-made motor scooter
- HAL Chetak, an Indian version of the Aérospatiale Alouette III helicopter
- Chetak, 1960 Indian film written and directed by Kidar Sharma
- Chetak, 1993 animated short film in the 41st National Film Awards in India
- Chetak and Nav Chetak, specially named locomotives of India
- Chetak Corps, nickname for the Indian Army's X Corps
- Chetak Rana Pratap, 1958 film featuring Mubarak Begum as playback singer
- Chetak (rocket), a two-stage-to-orbit small-lift launch vehicle developed by Bellatrix Aerospace

== See also ==
- Chetaka, king of Vaishali (India) in the 5th century BC
