= Udaipur City–Jaipur Vande Bharat Express =

Defunct Mini Vande Bharat Express train route in India

Udaipur City - Jaipur Junction Vande Bharat Express

Overview
- Service type: Vande Bharat Express
- Locale: Rajasthan
- First service: 24 September 2023 (Inaugural run); 25 September 2023; 3 years ago (Commercial run)
- Last service: 13 February 2026; 7 months ago (Permanently cancelled)
- Current operator: North Western Railways (NWR)

Route
- Termini: Udaipur City (UDZ); Jaipur Junction (JP)
- Stops: 7
- Distance travelled: 435 km (270 mi)
- Average journey time: 06 hrs 15 mins
- Service frequency: Three days a week (Note: Only Sundays, Wednesdays & Fridays)
- Train number: 20979 / 20980
- Line used: Mathura-Vadodara section (Udaipur-Chittaurgarh-Jaipur)

On-board services
- Classes: AC Chair Car, AC Executive Chair Car
- Seating arrangements: Airline style; Rotatable seats
- Sleeping arrangements: No
- Catering facilities: On-board Catering
- Observation facilities: Large windows in all coaches
- Entertainment facilities: On-board WiFi; Infotainment System; Electric outlets; Reading light; Seat Pockets; Bottle Holder; Tray Table
- Baggage facilities: Overhead racks
- Other facilities: Kavach

Technical
- Rolling stock: Mini Vande Bharat 2.0
- Track gauge: Indian gauge 1,676 mm (5 ft 6 in) broad gauge
- Electrification: 25 kV 50 Hz AC Overhead line
- Operating speed: 70 km/h (43 mph) (Avg.)
- Average length: 192 metres (630 ft) (08 coaches)
- Track owner: Indian Railways
- Rake maintenance: Udaipur City (UDZ)
- Rake sharing: 20981/20982 Udaipur City - Agra Cantonment - Udaipur City Vande Bharat Express

The 20979/20980 Udaipur City - Jaipur Vande Bharat Express was India's 26th and the 1st defunct Vande Bharat Express train, which ran across the state of Rajasthan by connecting the city of Udaipur and terminating at the Pink City of Jaipur. This train was inaugurated on 24 September 2023 by Prime Minister Narendra Modi via video conference from New Delhi.

Starting from 02 September 2024, this express train has reduced its frequency from 6 days (except Tuesday) to 3 days and had rake sharing with the formerly launched Udaipur City - Agra Cantonment Vande Bharat Express which also ran on 3 days a week basis.

== Overview ==
This train was operated by Indian Railways, connecting Udaipur City, Rana Pratap Nagar, Mavli Jn, Chittaurgarh Jn, Bhilwara, Bijainagar, Ajmer Jn, Kishangarh and Jaipur Jn. It was formerly operated with train numbers 20979/20980 on 3 days a week basis.

== Rakes ==
It was the twenty-fourth 2nd Generation and twelfth Mini Vande Bharat 2.0 Express train which was designed and manufactured by the Integral Coach Factory at Perambur, Chennai under the Make in India Initiative.

== Service ==
The 20979/20980 Udaipur City - Jaipur Jn Vande Bharat Express operated on Sun, Wed, Fri, covering a distance of 435 km (270 mi) in a travel time of 6 hours with an average speed of 69 km/h (43 mph). The service had 7 intermediate stops. The Maximum Permissible Speed was 130 km/h (81 mph).

== Incidents ==
On 2 October 2023 around 9:55 a.m. the locomotive pilots of Udaipur-Jaipur Vande Bharat express spotted stones and other obstructions on the tracks of the train, then the locomotive pilots applied emergency breaks right on time. avoiding any possible mishap. After the train stopped, the locomotive pilots got off the train and saw stones were placed and there were two one-feet-long rods on the track, then the locomotive pilot removed those obstacles to clear the track, the locomotive pilots also recorded this incident in their smartphones for evidences. This incident is currently under investigation by the Railway Police and the local police and a case has been registered and action will be taken against anti-social elements who are found guilty after an investigation.

== See also ==
- Vande Bharat Express
- Tejas Express
- Gatimaan Express
- Udaipur City railway station
- Jaipur Junction railway station
