= Udaipur City–Agra Cantonment Vande Bharat Express =

Defunct Mini Vande Bharat Express train route in India

Overview
- Service type: Vande Bharat Express
- Locale: Rajasthan and Uttar Pradesh
- First service: 3 September 2024; 2 years ago (Inaugural & Commercial)
- Last service: 14 February 2026; 7 months ago (Permanently cancelled)
- Current operator: North Western Railways (NWR)

Route
- Termini: Udaipur City (UDZ); Agra Cantonment (AGC)
- Stops: 7
- Distance travelled: 610 km (379 mi)
- Average journey time: 08 hrs 45 mins
- Service frequency: Three days a week (Note: Only Mondays, Thursdays & Saturdays)
- Train number: 20981 / 20982
- Lines used: Udaipur–Chittaurgarh–Kota line; Mumbai–Delhi main line (till Bayana Junction); Bayana–Agra line

On-board services
- Classes: AC Chair Car, AC Executive Chair Car
- Seating arrangements: Airline style; Rotatable seats
- Sleeping arrangements: No
- Catering facilities: On board Catering
- Observation facilities: Large windows in all coaches
- Entertainment facilities: On-board WiFi; Infotainment System; Electric outlets; Reading light; Seat Pockets; Bottle Holder; Tray Table
- Baggage facilities: Overhead racks
- Other facilities: Kavach

Technical
- Rolling stock: Mini Vande Bharat 2.0
- Track gauge: Indian gauge 1,676 mm (5 ft 6 in) broad gauge
- Electrification: 25 kV 50 Hz AC Overhead line
- Operating speed: 70 km/h (43 mph) (Avg.)
- Average length: 192 metres (630 ft) (08 coaches)
- Track owner: Indian Railways
- Rake maintenance: Udaipur City (UDZ)
- Rake sharing: 20979/20980 Udaipur City - Jaipur - Udaipur City Vande Bharat Express

The 20981/20982 Udaipur City–Agra Cantonment Vande Bharat Express was India's 55th and 2nd defunct Vande Bharat Express train, which connected the city of Udaipur in Rajasthan with the bank city of Yamuna River, Agra in Uttar Pradesh. This express train was inaugurated on 2 September 2024 at Udaipur City and had another service train to Jaipur Junction.

== Overview ==
This train was formerly operated by Indian Railways, connecting Udaipur City, Rana Pratap Nagar, Mavli Jn, Chanderiya, Bundi, Kota Jn, Sawai Madhopur Jn, Gangapur City and Agra Cantonment. It formerly operated with train numbers 20981/20982 on 3 days a week basis (Mondays, Thursdays and Saturdays) and had rake sharing with Udaipur City–Jaipur Vande Bharat Express which also ran only for 3 days a week basis (Sundays, Wednesdays and Fridays).

== Rakes ==
It was the same twenty-fourth 2nd Generation and twelfth Mini Vande Bharat 2.0 Express train which was designed and manufactured by the Integral Coach Factory at Perambur, Chennai under the Make in India Initiative.

== Service ==
The 20981/20982 Udaipur City - Agra Cantt Vande Bharat Express operated on Mon, Thu, Sat, covering a distance of 610 km (380 mi) in a travel time of 8 hours with an average speed of 70 km/h (43 mph). The service had 7 intermediate stops. The Maximum Permissible Speed was 130 km/h (81 mph).

== See also ==
- Udaipur City–Jaipur Vande Bharat Express
- Vande Bharat Express
- Tejas Express
- Gatimaan Express
- Udaipur City railway station
- Agra Cantonment railway station
