= Udaipur City–New Jalpaiguri Weekly Express =

Train in India

Udaipur City – New Jalpaiguri Weekly Express
Overview
- Service type: Express
- Locale: Rajasthan, Haryana, Delhi, Uttar Pradesh, Bihar & West Bengal
- Current operator: North Western Railway

Route
- Termini: Udaipur City (UDZ); New Jalpaiguri Junction (NJP)
- Stops: 22
- Distance travelled: 2,238 km (1,391 mi)
- Average journey time: 42h 15m
- Service frequency: Weekly (Note: Runs one day in a week for every direction.)
- Train number: 19601/19602

On-board services
- Classes: AC 2 tier, AC 3 tier, Sleeper class, General Unreserved
- Seating arrangements: No
- Sleeping arrangements: Yes
- Catering facilities: On-board catering E-catering
- Observation facilities: Large windows
- Baggage facilities: No
- Other facilities: Below the seats

Technical
- Rolling stock: LHB coach
- Track gauge: 1,676 mm (5 ft 6 in)
- Operating speed: 51 km/h (32 mph) average including halts

The 19601 / 19602 Udaipur City–New Jalpaiguri Weekly Express is an express train belonging to North Western Railway zone that runs between Udaipur City railway station, Udaipur, Rajasthan and New Jalpaiguri Junction, Siliguri, West Bengal in India. It operates with 19601/19602 train numbers on a weekly basis.

== Service ==
- The 19601/Udaipur City–New Jalpaiguri Weekly Express has an average speed of 51 km/h and covers 2,238 km in 42h 15m.
- The 19602/New Jalpaiguri–Udaipur City Weekly Express has an average speed of 51 km/h and covers 2,238 km in 43h 40m.

== Route and halts ==
The important halts of the train are:

- Udaipur City
- Rana Pratap Nagar
- Chittaurgarh Junction
- Ajmer Junction
- Jaipur Junction
- Alwar Junction
- Rewari Junction
- Gurgaon
- Delhi Cantonment
- Delhi Junction
- Moradabad Junction
- Bareilly Junction
- Lucknow Charbagh
- Gorakhpur Junction
- Deoria Sadar
- Siwan Junction
- Chhapra Junction
- Hajipur Junction
- Muzaffarpur Junction
- Samastipur Junction
- Khagaria Junction
- Katihar Junction
- New Jalpaiguri Junction

This train will start stopping at Bareilly Junction from March 2019 onwards.

== Coach composition ==
The train has standard ICF rakes with a maximum speed of 110 km/h. The train consists of 22 coaches: now the train is running with LHB rakes from both sides.

- 2 AC II tier
- 4 AC III tier
- 8 sleeper coaches
- 6 general unreserved
- 2 seating cum luggage rake

== Traction ==
Both trains are hauled by a Ghaziabad based WAP-7 electric locomotive from Udaipur to New Jalpaiguri and vice versa.

== Direction reversal ==
The train reverses its direction once, at Chittaurgarh Junction

== See also ==
- Shalimar–Udaipur City Weekly Express
- Ananya Express
