= Shalimar–Udaipur City Weekly Express =

Train in India

Overview
- Service type: Superfast
- First service: 19 February 2012; 13 years ago
- Current operator: North Western Railway

Route
- Termini: Shalimar (SHM); Udaipur City (UDZ)
- Stops: 22
- Distance travelled: 1,873 km (1,164 mi)
- Average journey time: 32h 30m
- Service frequency: Weekly (Note: Runs one day in a week for every direction.)
- Train number: 20971/20972

On-board services
- Classes: AC 2 tier, AC 3 tier, Sleeper class, General Unreserved
- Seating arrangements: Yes
- Sleeping arrangements: Yes
- Catering facilities: On-board catering E-catering
- Observation facilities: LHB coach
- Entertainment facilities: No
- Baggage facilities: No
- Other facilities: Below the seats

Technical
- Track gauge: 1,676 mm (5 ft 6 in)
- Operating speed: 58 km/h (36 mph), including halts

The Shalimar–Udaipur City Weekly Express is an Superfast Express train belonging to North Western Railway zone that runs between Shalimar and Udaipur City in India. It is currently being operated with 20971/20972 train numbers on a weekly basis.

== Service ==
The 20972/Shalimar–Udaipur City Weekly Express has an average speed of 56 km/h and covers 1873 km in 33h 15m. The 20971/Udaipur City–Shalimar Weekly Express has an average speed of 58 km/h and covers 1873 km in 32h 30m.

== Time table ==
From Udaipur City to Shalimar - 20971. The train starts from Udaipur City on every Saturday.

Station code	Station name	Arrival	Departure
UDZ	Udaipur City	---	01:00
RPZ	Ranapratapnagar	01:07	01:09
MVJ	Mavli Jn	01:40	01:42
CNA	Chanderiya	03:05	03:10
KOTA	Kota Junction	05:30	05:50
BAZ	Baran	06:43	06:45
GUNA	Guna Jn	09:20	09:30
MAKR	Bina Malkhedi Jn	11:53	11:55
SGO	Saugor	12:50	12:55
DMO	Damoh	13:58	14:00
KMZ	Katni Murwara	15:45	15:55
SDL	Shahdol	18:20	18:25
APR	Anuppur Junction	19:00	19:05
PND	Pendra Road	19:42	19:44
BSP	Bilaspur Junction	21:35	21:50
CPH	Champa Junction	22:31	22:36
RIG	Raigarh	23:39	23:44
JSG	Jharsuguda	01:05	01:10
ROU	Rourkela Junctrion	02:20	02:30
CKP	Chakradhapur	03:55	04:00
TATA	Tatanagar Junction	04:50	04:58
KGP	Kharagpur	07:20	07:25
SRC	Santragachi Junction	09:00	09:02
SHM	Kolkata Shalimar	09:30	---

Note : Train reverses its direction at Kota Junction.

From Shalimar to Udaipur City - 20972. The train starts from Shalimar on every Sunday.

Station code	Station name	Arrival	Departure
SHM	Kolkata Shalimar	---	20:20
SRC	Santragachi Junction	20:35	20:37
KGP	Kharagpur	22:00	22:05
TATA	Tatanagar Junction	23:57	00:02
CKP	Chakradharpur	00:53	01:00
ROU	Rourkela Junction	02:18	02:23
JSG	Jhursuguda	03:53	03:55
RIG	Raigarh	04;48	04;53
CPH	Champa Junction	05:57	06:02
BSP	Bilaspur Junction	07:05	07:20
PND	Pendra Road	08:55	09:00
APR	Anuppur Junction	09:51	09:56
SDL	Shahdol	10:32	10:37
KMZ	Katni Murwara	13:20	13:30
DMO	Damoh	14:58	15:00
SGO	Saugor	15:55	16:00
MAKR	Bina Malkhedi Jn	17:13	17:15
GUNA	Guna Jn	19:55	20:05
BAZ	Baran	22:18	22:20
KOTA	Kota Junction	00:10	00:30
CNA	Chanderiya	03:05	03:10
MVJ	Mavli Jn	04:23	04:25
RPZ	Ranapratapnagar	05:00	05:02
UDZ	Udaipur City	05:35	---

Note : Train reverses its direction at Kota Junction.

== Coach composition ==
The train has standard LHB rakes with a maximum speed of 130 km/h. The train consists of 21 coaches:

- 2 AC II Tier
- 6 AC III Tier
- 7 Sleeper coaches
- 4 General Unreserved
- 1 Divyangjan Cum Guard Coach
- 1 Generator Car

Loco	1	2	3	4	5	6	7	8	9	10	11	12	13	14	15	16	17	18	19	20	21
	SLRD	GEN	GEN	A1	A2	B1	B2	B3	B4	B5	BE1	S1	S2	S3	S4	S5	S6	S7	GEN	GEN	EOG

== Traction ==
Both trains are hauled by a Santragachi Loco Shed/Tughlakabad Loco Shed based WAP-7 Locomotive.

== Direction reversal ==
The train reverses its direction at Kota Junction

== See also ==
- Udaipur City railway station
- Shalimar railway station
- Ananya Express
