= Gulab Bagh and Zoo =

Garden in Udaipur, Rajasthan, India

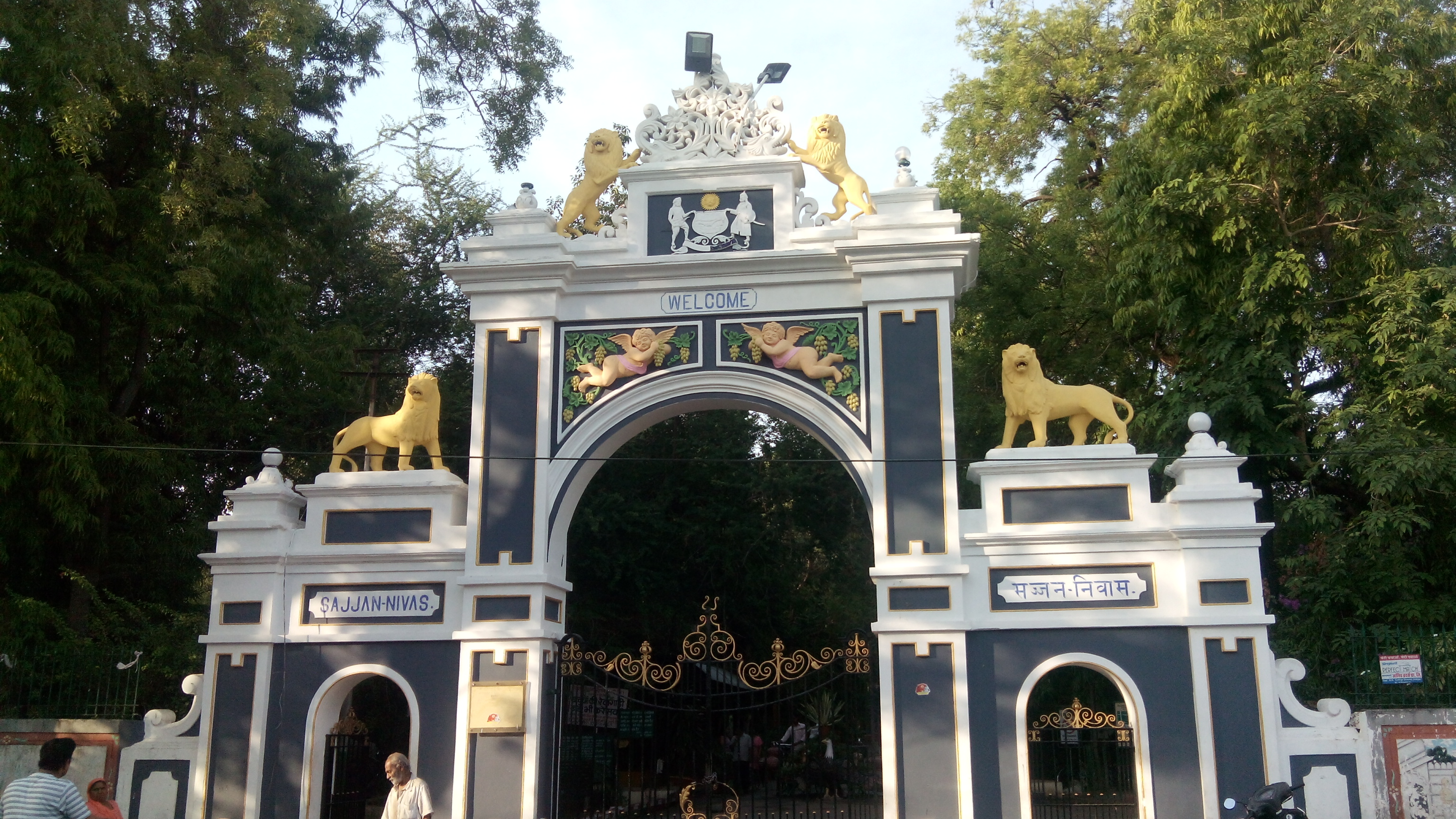
- Park Entrance
- Interactive map of Gulab Bagh and Zoo
- Location: Udaipur, Rajasthan, India
- Coordinates: 24°34′17″N 73°41′34″E
- Area: 100 acres (40 ha)

Gulab Bagh (Sajjan Niwas Garden) is the largest garden in Udaipur, Rajasthan, India. It is spread over 100 acres (40 ha) of land. The garden has innumerable varieties of roses. Gulab Bagh gets its name from the abundance of rose flowers it has.

== Overview ==
Gulab Bagh is an old Sub-City Level Park, having lush green campus and several places of attraction including ponds, library, zoological park, temples and several government offices. It houses 12 Bovri's, 5 tubewells, 1 large pond (Kamal Talai – under rejuvenation), 1 zoological park, couple of temples – Arya Samaj, Hanuman, Dargah etc. and a range of Government offices like 2 forest offices, 2 PHED offices, 1 PWD office, 1 library etc. The park has 4 entrance gates, which are designed artistically as old masonry structure. Out of 4, only 2 gates are open for general public. There is appropriate parking facility is available at 2 operational entry gates, and it can currently accommodate 350 two wheelers and 50 car parking inside the park. The entire park is surrounded by a boundary wall, 3–5 m in height and made of mix of concrete, stone and brick.

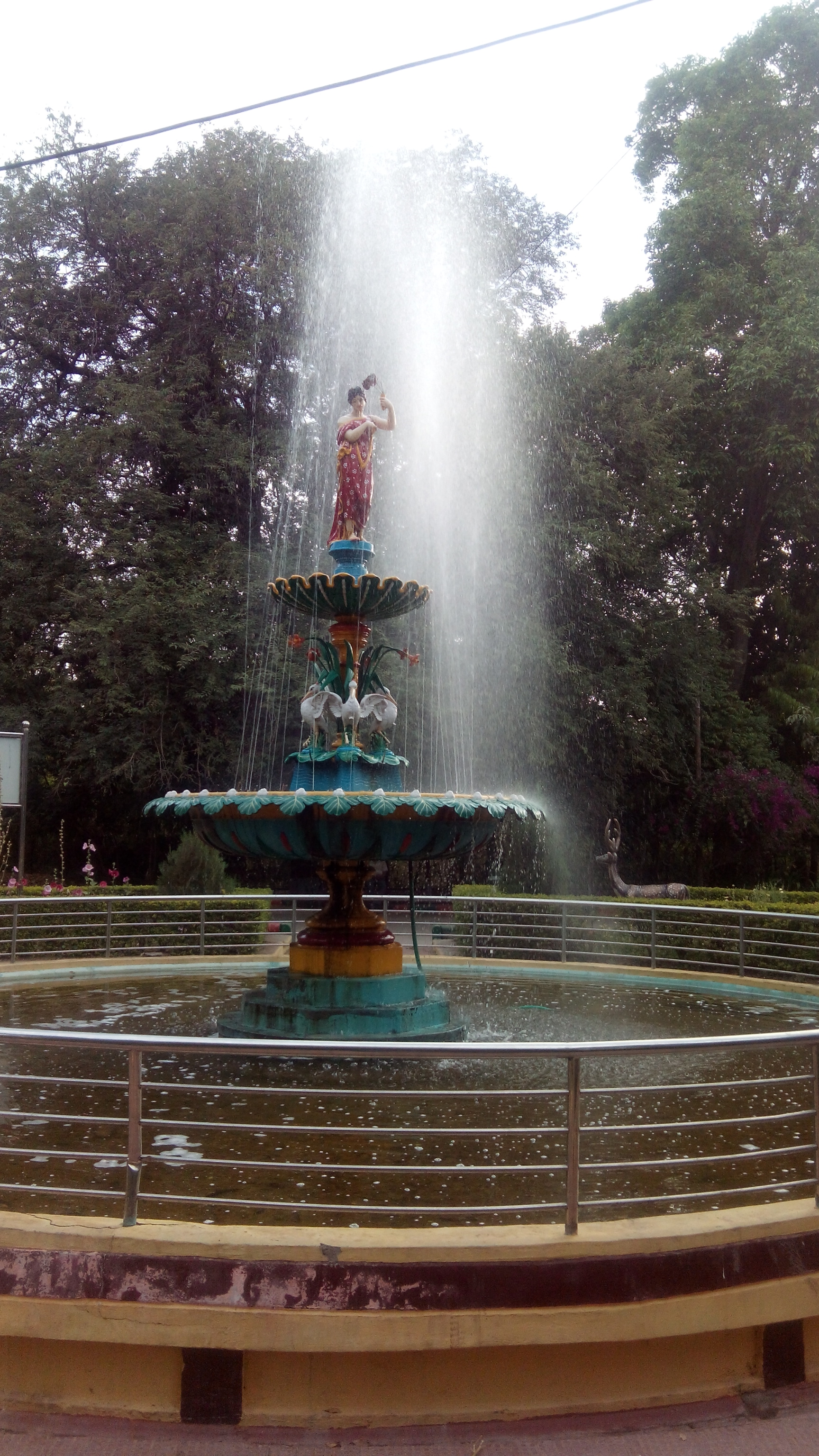
A picture showing a fountain inside Gulab Bagh.

== History ==
Gulab Bagh, also known as Sajjan Niwas Garden, was built by Maharana fateh Singh in the 1887. It is the fourth oldest zoo in the semi-continent. It spans across 66 acres of land, and is hailed as one of the most beautiful and largest garden in Rajasthan. By Maharana's volition, a horticulturist from Madras, T.H. Story, was appointed in 1882 to stock the garden with plants with medicinal values on the 66.5 acres of land and worked there until 1920. The garden consisted of a Lotus Pond, and many prominent trees that included many species of mangoes, guava, grapes, lemon, bor, mulberry, rayan, pomegranate, bananas, sapota, tamarind, bullock's heart (ramphal), lichi, arjun trees, wood apple, karonda, camphor, citron, jamun, pummelo, meetha neem, kargi lime, ficus species, anola, jack fruit, dhanverjia, grandi flora, jasmin, dawood etc. In the year 1882, all the trees had their name-plates denoting Hindi, English, and systematic botanical names, which are not the same now. A small pond existed in the garden before it was demolished for the construction of Water works complex. In this pond a water lily, Victoria sp., was initially planted. The leaf of Victoria could withstand a child on a chair kept on it, a property common to all the water-lilies of the genus due to plant's structure.

The garden draws its name as Gulab Bagh due to the presence of a ranch where variety roses can be found in abundance. The garden was also called Bada Bagh but the name dropped has out of popular use.

Maharana Sajjan Singh placed the foundation stone of the Victoria museum(now called Saraswati Bhawan Library) in the garden on 2 November 1890. It was inaugurated by Lord Lansdown. Mr. Gauri Shankar Ojha was the first curator of this museum appointed in the year 1890. The museum had many rare artefacts and stone manuscripts dating from 3rd Century B.C. to 17th Century A.D.

British Prince Albert Victor unveiled a stone statue of Queen Victoria on 19 February 1890, in front of Victoria Museum which has now been replaced with a statue of Mahatma Gandhi.

Various Flower and Vegetable shows were organized in the garden starting from the first one in 1888 by Maharana Fateh Singh. The zoo organized fights meant for entertainment between lions or tigers and wild boars. The zoo upon the fifth decade of its commencement included plenty of rare species including animals like Black Leopards, Rhinos, Ostriches, Zebras, hoolock gibbons, etc. most of the animals were transferred to other zoos in India after Independence.

== Location and Accessibility ==
Gulab Bagh is situated at the center of the city, spread from the edges of Surajpole and Udiapole area, and the nearest colonies are Nayio ki Talai, Choti Brahmpuri, Kalaji-Goraji and Mograwadi. The main road circling around the entire Gulab Bagh is called as Gulabh Bagh Road. Various Hotels and other attractions like Vintage and Classic Car Museum, Pala Ganesh Temple are situated near around this place for visitors. Situated quite near Pichola Lake on Lake Palace Road, Gulab Bagh is an interesting park in the southeast of City Palace complex. It is easily accessible from the city by local transport, taxis or autorickshaws. It is currently visited by 3000 persons per day, including tourists.

== Places of interest within the garden ==
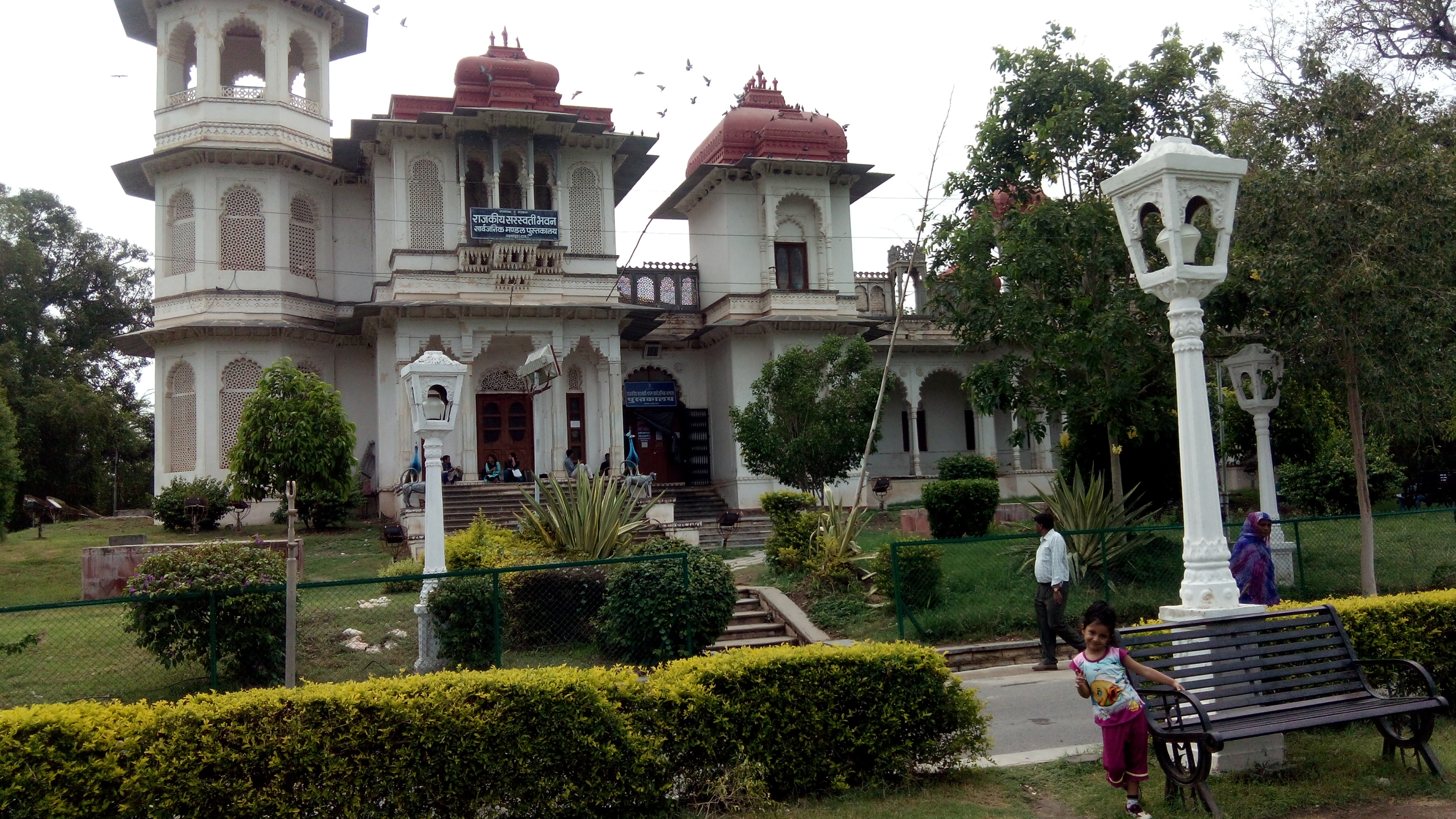
Front Entrance of Saraswati Library.

=== Saraswati Library ===
Gulab Bagh encompasses a library, Saraswati Library, which was originally a museum known as Victoria Hall Museum. This was the first museum in the whole of Rajasthan, constructed by Maharan Fateh Singh in 1887, which was made operational for public on 1 November 1890. In 1968, the museum was shifted to the City Palace, and was renamed as Pratap Museum, while the building was converted into a public library. The museum is still famous for its collection of antiques, curios, royal household items and other interesting relics from the past. This library houses more than 32000 books related to history, archaeology, Indology and several manuscripts that date back to the early medieval period. The RRLF section has 26215 books, while kids section has 3800 books. Upon registration with the library, several books are available for reading for 14 days. It also houses a large-sized idol of Queen Victoria, carved in white marble. This idol was originally placed in the huge garden just outside the library. But after independence, in around 1948, this statue was removed and replaced with one of Mahatma Gandhi to cherish the victory of nationalism.

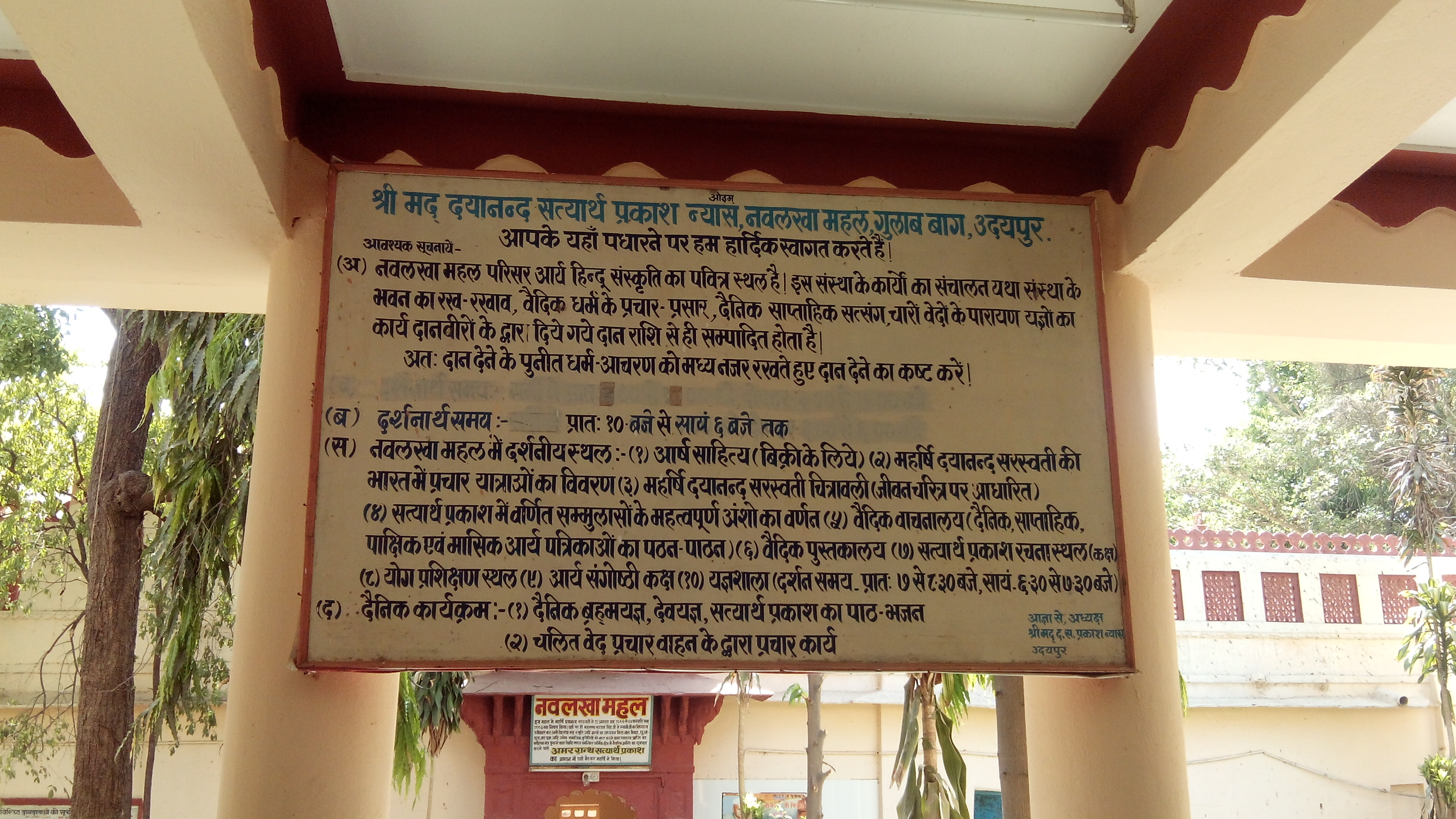
Information board inside Navlakha Mahal.

=== Navlakha Mahal ===
Gulab Bagh has a Navlakha Mahal or Navlakha Palace, which is a religious place for Arya Samaj. This is situated at the center most area of the entire garden. This is considered to be one of the places where Dayananda Saraswati, the founder of Arya Samaj had spent his spiritual life. Swami Dayanand made correction to his book Satyarth Prakash at Navlakha Mahal and printed the second edition in Samvat 1939 (1882 CE).

=== Toy Train ===
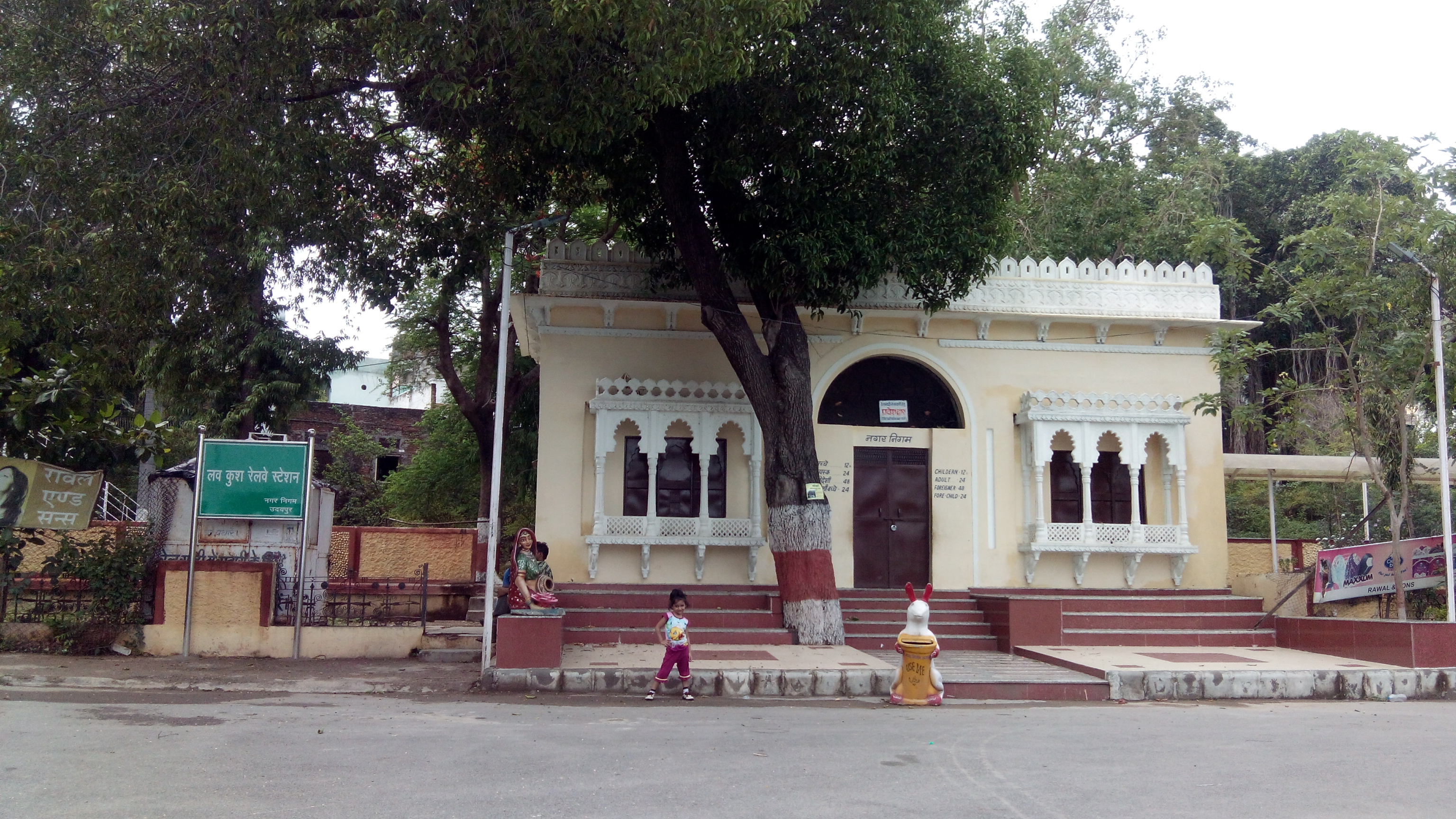
Luv Kush Railway Station Entrance Gate.

There is also a small train that meanders within the zoo. It is open for kids as well as adults, and there is a nominal fees for the ride. The train station is named as Luv Kush Railway Station.

=== Gulab Bagh Zoo ===
A zoo is situated within the garden, at a short walk away through rose plants and open parks. The zoo, as such, is quite small. Animals and birds of many varieties are housed in cages. But there is enough enjoyment for the kids who can be seen craning their necks to get a glimpse of the tiger or the bear.

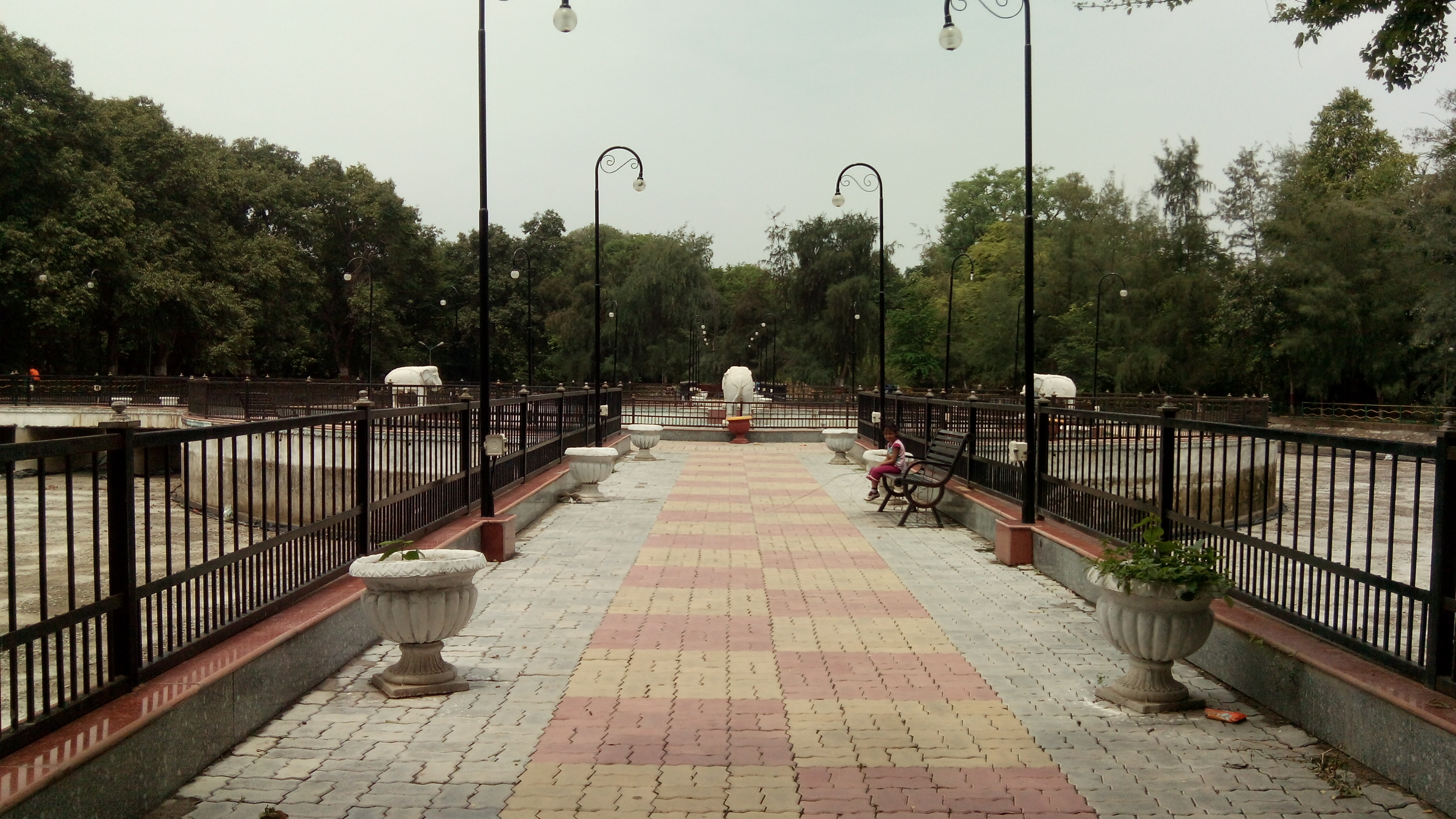
Kamal Talai.

=== Kamal Talai ===
There is a huge artificial water body named as Kamal Talai, situated towards north-eastern end of Gulab Bagh. It is an oval-like structure, consisting of four bridges connecting with each other at the central junction.

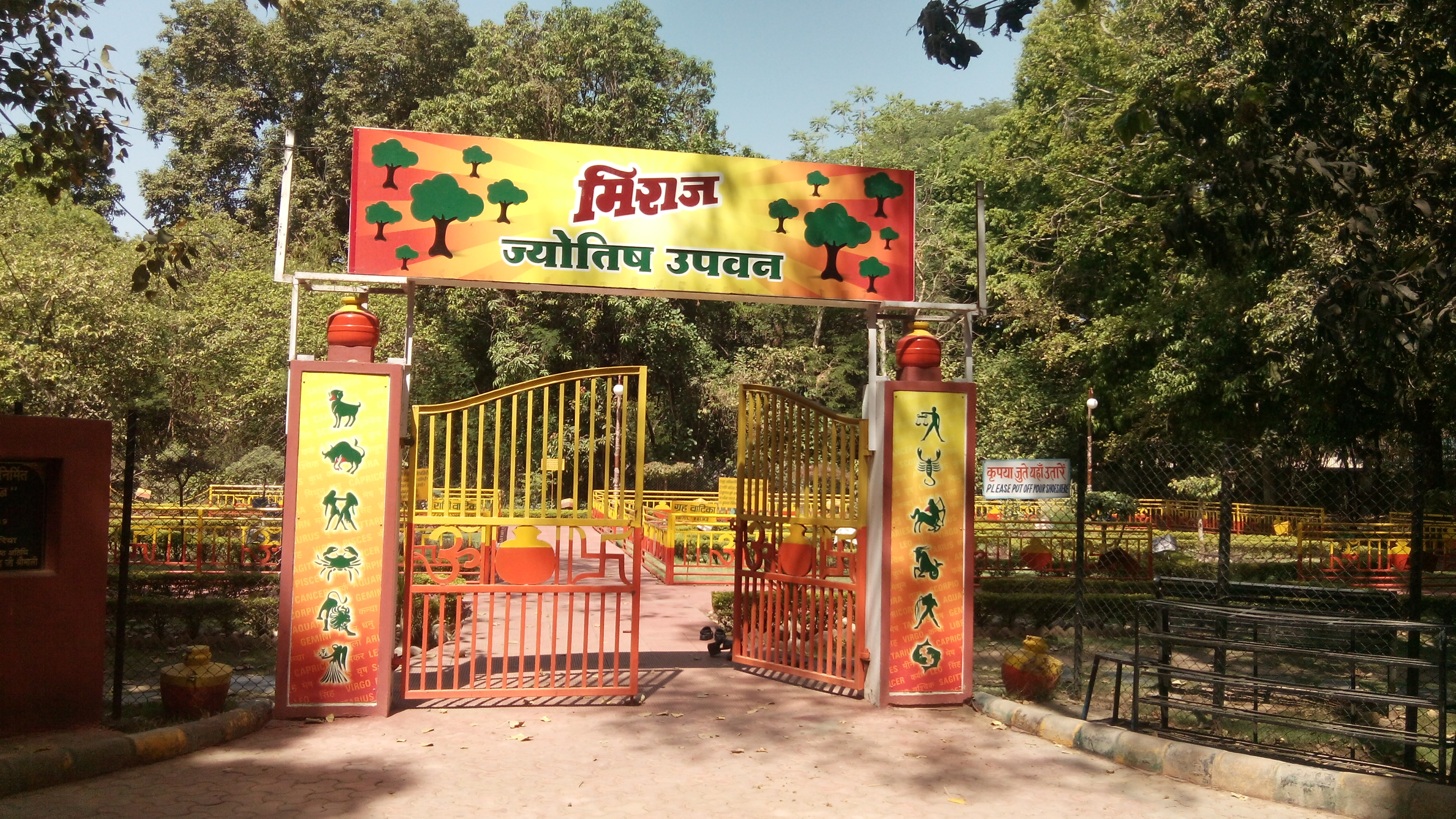
Miraj Jyotish Upvan

=== Miraj Jyotish Upvan ===
There is an Acupressure park called ‘Miraj Jyotish Upvan’ constructed and maintained by Miraj Products corporate group. It has tethered tiles for increasing blood circulation in human body. It also showcases numerous Ayurvedic and non-ayurvedic plants across the acupressure pathways.
