= Udaipur City–Patliputra Humsafar Express =

Udaipur City - Patliputra Junction Humsafar Express
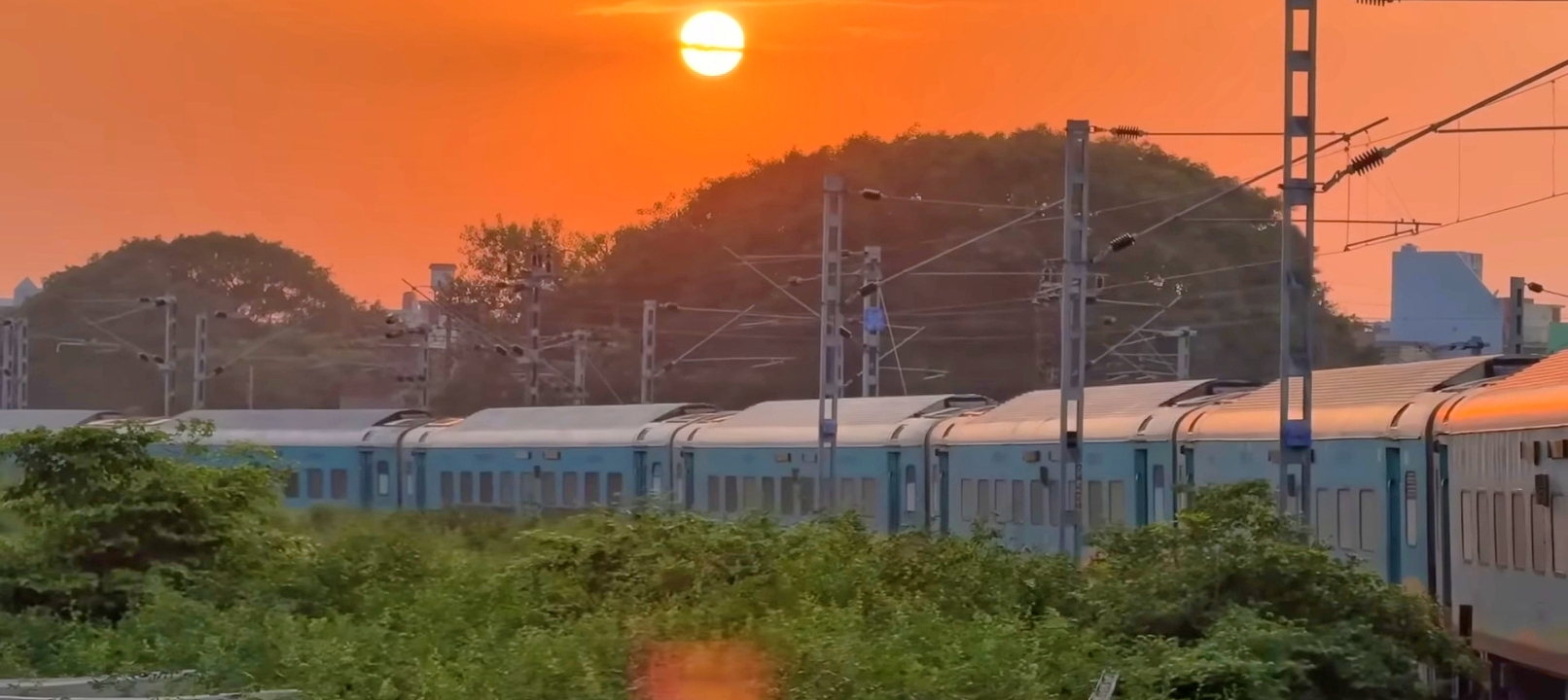
- Udaipur City - Patliputra Junction; Humsafar Express At Kasganj Junction railway station

Overview
- Service type: Humsafar Express
- First service: 5 October 2018; 7 years ago
- Current operator: North Western Railways

Route
- Termini: Udaipur City (UDZ); Patliputra (PPTA)
- Stops: 20
- Distance travelled: 1,565 km (972 mi)
- Average journey time: 32h 55m
- Service frequency: Weekly
- Train number: 19669 / 19670

On-board services
- Class: AC 3 tier
- Seating arrangements: No
- Sleeping arrangements: Yes
- Catering facilities: Available
- Observation facilities: Large windows
- Baggage facilities: Yes

Technical
- Rolling stock: LHB Humsafar
- Track gauge: 1,676 mm (5 ft 6 in)
- Operating speed: 48 km/h (30 mph) Avg. Speed

The 19669/19670 Udaipur City - Patliputra Humsafar Express is a superfast express train of the Indian Railways connecting Udaipur City in Rajasthan and Patliputra Junction in Bihar. It is currently being operated with 19669/19670 train numbers on a weekly basis.

== Coach composition ==
The train is completely 3-tier AC sleeper designed by Indian Railways with features of LED screen display to show information about stations, train speed etc. and will have announcement system as well, Vending machines for tea, coffee and milk, Bio toilets in compartments as well as CCTV cameras.

== Service ==
It averages 48 km/h as 19669/Udaipur City - Patliputra Humsafar Express starts on Wednesday from Udaipur City covering 1565 km in 32 hrs 55 mins & 49 km/h as 19670/Patliputra - Udaipur City Humsafar Express starts on Saturday from Patliputra Junction covering 1565 km in 32 hrs 10 min. The route between DDU and Kanpur via Lucknow should have been avoided. More than 100 km more has to be covered. Similarly, the distance between Kanpur and Bharatpur could have been reduced by another 100 km. This might have been done keeping in view of Varanasi, Lucknow and Kasganj passengers. But, Patliputra passengers may view this as a useless bargain. They feel that for long-distance trains, the average speed must be around 61 kmph instead of 48 kmph.

== Traction ==
Both trains are hauled by a WAP 7 of Mughal Sarai Junction Electric Locomotive Shed on its entire journey.

== Route and halts ==
1. Udaipur City
2. Mavli Junction
3. Chanderiya
4. Bundi
5. Kota Junction
6. Sawai Madhopur Junction
7. Bharatpur Junction
8. Achhnera Junction
9. Mathura Junction
10. Hathras City
11. Kasganj Junction
12. Farrukhabad Junction
13. Kannauj
14. Kanpur Central
15. Lucknow Charbagh
16. Sultanpur Junction
17. Varanasi Junction
18. Pt. Deen Dayal Upadhyaya Junction
19. Buxar
20. Ara Junction
21. Danapur
22. Patliputra Junction

== Direction reversal ==
Train Reverses its direction 2 times:

- Kota Junction
- Achhnera Junction

== See also ==
- Udaipur City - Delhi Sarai Rohilla Rajasthan Humsafar Express
- Udaipur City - Mysuru Palace Queen Humsafar Express
