= Bijainagar railway station =

Railway station in Rajasthan, India

Bijainagar

General information
- Location: Bijainagar, Ajmer district, Rajasthan; India
- Coordinates: 25.929059°N 74.652342°E
- Elevation: 403 metres (1,322 ft)
- System: Indian Railways station
- Owner: Indian Railways
- Operator: North Western Railway
- Line: Ajmer–Ratlam line
- Platforms: 2
- Tracks: 2

Construction
- Structure type: Standard (on ground station)
- Parking: Yes

Other information
- Status: Functioning
- Station code: BJNR
- Zone(s): North Western Railway
- Division(s): Ajmer
Location
- Location within India Location within Rajasthan

Bijainagar railway station is a railway station in Ajmer district, Rajasthan. Its code is BJNR. It serves Bijainagar town. The station consists of 2 platforms. Passenger, Express, and Superfast trains halt here. It is currently undergoing redevelopment under the Amrit Station Scheme, which is set to be completed by May 2025.
