= Bijainagar =

BIJAINAGAR Bijaynagar Vijaynagar
- City
- Location in Rajasthan, India BIJAINAGAR (India)
- Coordinates: 25°55′48″N 74°38′19″E
- Country: India
- State: Rajasthan
- District: Beawar
- Established: 1919
- Founder: Rao Bijai Singh ji, Masuda
- Named for: Rao Bijai Singh

Government
  - Type: Municipality
  - Chairman: Mamta Amit Modi (BJP)
  - Vice chairman: Khushboo Pihul Lunawat (INC)

Population (2024)
  - Total: 143,000

Languages
  - Official: Marwadi
- Time zone: UTC+5:30 (IST)
- Postal code: 305624
- Website: www.bijainagar.co.in

Bijainagar is a city and headquarters of Bijainagar tehsil in the Beawar district of the Indian state of Rajasthan. It was founded by Shri Rao Saheb Vijay Singh ji Of Masuda in 1919 CE. This city is situated along the Khari River close to the southern border of Ajmer District.

== Demographics ==
Religion in Bijainagar (2011)
1. Hinduism (71.1%)
2. Jainism (14.1%)
3. Islam (13.9%)
4. Christianity (0.46%)
5. Sikhism (0.30%)
6. Buddhism (0.00%)
7. Other or none (0.11%)

As of the 2011 Indian census, Bijainagar has a population of 32,124. The population is 51 percent male and 49 percent female. Bijainagar has an average literacy rate of 69 percent, which is higher than the national average of 59.5 percent. Male literacy is 78 percent and female literacy is 60 percent. 14 percent of the population is aged six or less. Most of the population practices the Hindu religion.

== Geography ==
The area is known as "Krishi Mandi" is the second largest region in the state of Rajasthan for the production of cotton.

The main water source is the Bisalpur Dam, which supplies Rajasthan's largest water treatment plant. The Para 1 Dam in Para is one of the major irrigation dams in the Ajmer District.

== Economy ==
Bijainagar is an industrial area with businesses that include the Agricultural Mandi (Market Yard), cattle feed plants, oil mills, woolen yarn mills, flour mills, ceramic industries, as well as a cotton and synthetic waste recycling plant.

== Culture ==
=== Temples ===
Bijainagar was the death place of Shri Pannalal Ji Maharaj, great saint of Jains, People used to visit his samadhi Shri panna guru dhyan sadhna kendra, situated at Pragya College

Bijainagar has many temples.

1. Balaji Mandir (Sabji Mandi)
2. Chamatkari Hanuman Mandir (Station wale Balaji)
3. Church
4. Digamber Jain Mandir (Sathana Baazar)
5. Ganesh Mandir
6. Gurudwara
7. Laxmi Narayan Mandir (Bada Mandir)
8. Mosque (Rajnagar)
9. Nakoda Jain Temple (Rajdarbar colony)
10. Radha krishna mandir (Purana mandir)
11. Shani Dev Mandir
12. Shiv Mandir
13. Shiv Mandir (Bapu Baazar)
14. Shiv Mandir (Kekri Road, Rajnagar)
15. Shiv Mandir (Peepli Chouraha)
16. Shri Harshiddhi Ganesh Mandir (Chosla)
17. Shwetamber Jain Mandir (Mahavir Bazar)
18. Shiv ji Ki Chhatari, (Kekri Road, Rajnagar)
19. Shri Dev Narayan Mandir, (Near Pokhrana Factori)
20. Triveni Matna Mandir (Teja Chowk)
21. Sitla mata mandir
22. Tejaji Mandir
23. Vishwakarma Temple
24. Shri panna guru dhyan sadhna kendra
25. Radha krishan temple (Gopal Badi)
26. Karant Wale Balaji (Subhash Nagar)
27. Charbhuja temple (Rajnagar)
28. Charbhuja temple (Chosla)

== Transport ==
Direct Rail Connectivity to major cities like Delhi, Mumbai, Surat, Ahmedabad, Kolkata, Hyderabad, Bhopal, Indore, Jammu, Haridwar, Rishikesh. The nearest airport is Kishangarh Airport 100 kms away which serves Ajmer, Kishangarh, Bijainagar, Bhilwara. Bijainagar is well connected to 6 Lane expressway which connects to major cities of India.

== Education ==
=== Colleges ===
- Shri Pragya College, PG College

College of Science, Technology, Management, Arts and Commerce

- Sanjivani College, Bijainagar
- Smt. Rama Devi B.Ed. College

=== Schools ===
- Pragya International School (English Medium Only)
- St. Paul's School a Roman Catholic Diocesan Secondary School CBSE(English Medium Only)
- Government Senior Secondary Schools (separate for boys and girls)
- Shri Pragya Public School (situated near the state highway) www.Pragyaschool.Com
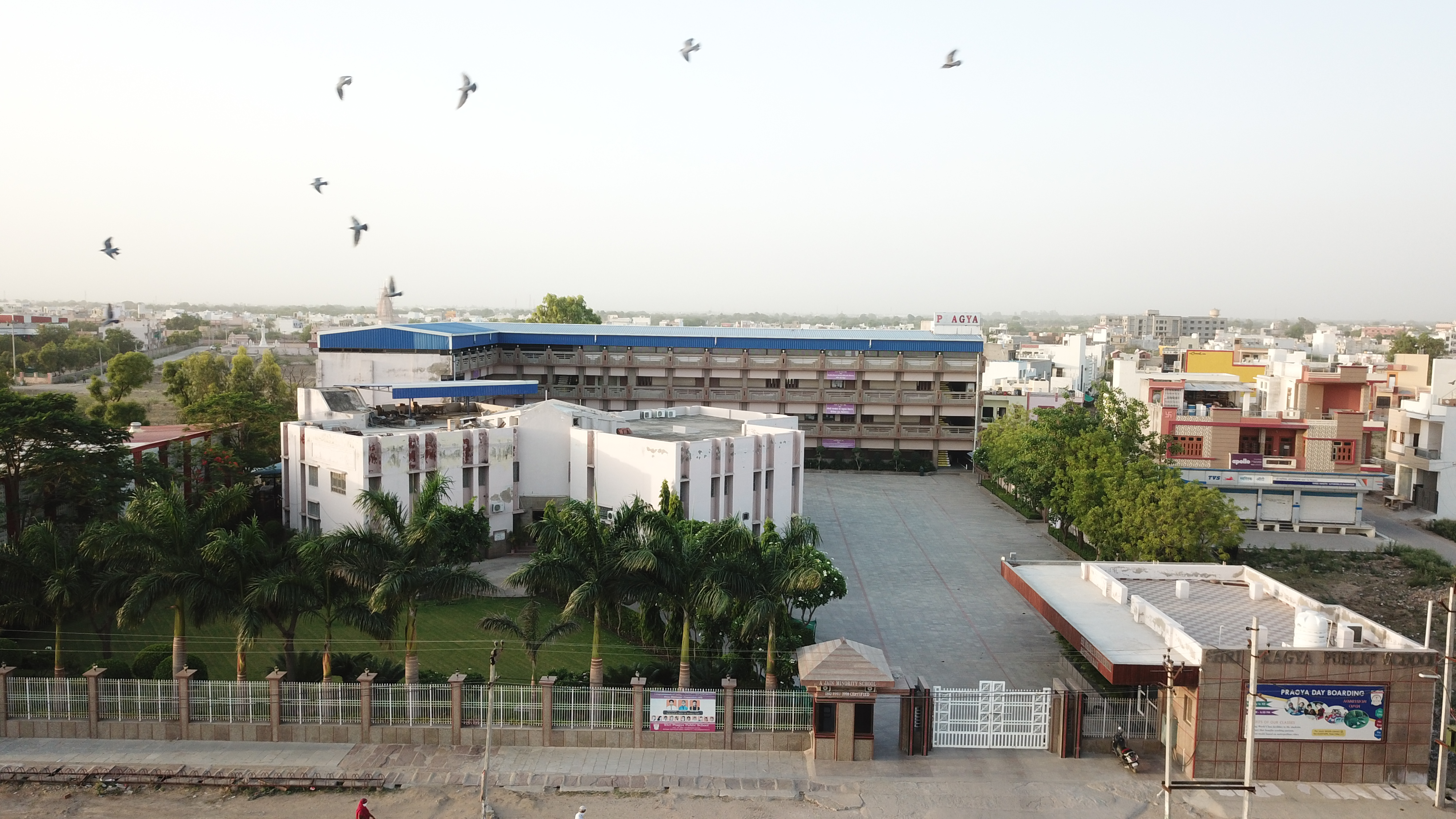
  Shri Pragya Public School
- Saraswati Senior Secondary School Bijainagar
- Vaatsalya School (near head post office)
- Yash Bhumi Modern School (opposite railway station) bijainagar
- Ajmeru Public School, Kekri Road, Bijianagar
- Adrash Vidhya Mandir, Bijainagar
- Keshav International School, Bijainagar
- Shashikala Primary School, Bijainagar
- Pragya Group of Institutions https://pgi.education/
- Pragya Play School
