= Chandpole (Udaipur) =

Locality in Rajasthan, India

- Locality
- Interactive map of Chandpole
- Coordinates: 24.5822277°N 73.6817778°E
- Country: India
- State: Rajasthan
- City: Udaipur

Chandpole is a locality in the Udaipur city of Rajasthan state.

== General ==
Udaipur was one time surrounded by the City Wall of Udaipur, called in Hindi Parkota. One entry gate among seven is Chandpole Darvaja, the others being Hathipole, Udiapole, Surajpole, DelhiGate, and so on. It has now a large market in the city.
