= Maharana Pratap Airport =

Airport serving Udaipur, Rajasthan, India

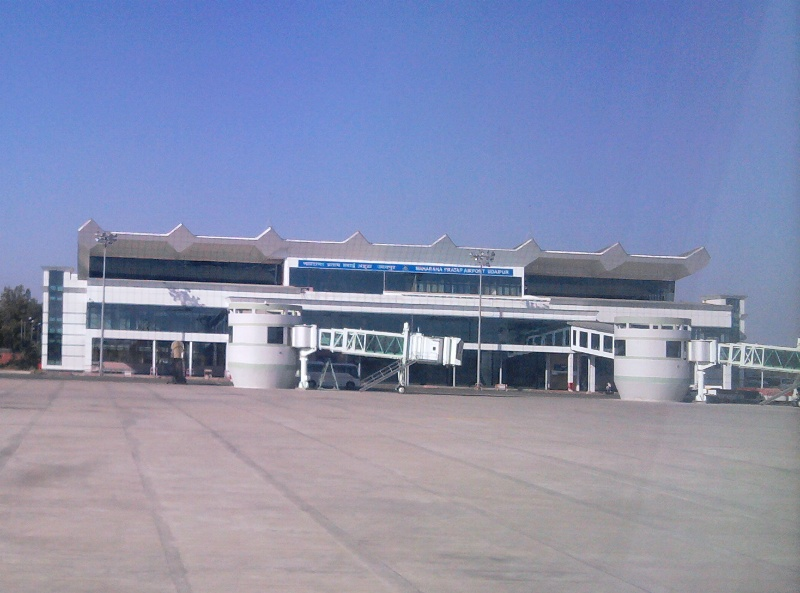
- IATA: UDR; ICAO: VAUD

Summary
- Airport type: Public
- Operator: Airports Authority of India
- Serves: Udaipur
- Location: Dabok, Udaipur district, Rajasthan, India
- Elevation AMSL: 513 m (1,683 ft)
- Coordinates: 24°37′03.2″N 73°53′40″E
- Website: Udaipur Airport

Map
- Location of the airport in Rajasthan UDR (India)

Runways
Direction	Length		Surface
Direction	m	ft	Surface
08/26	2,743	9,000	Asphalt

Statistics (April 2025 - March 2026)
- Passengers: 18,19,531 (▲10.2%)
- Aircraft movements: 13,823 (▲0.02%)
- Cargo tonnage: 589.2 (▲71%)
- Source: AAI

Maharana Pratap Airport (IATA: UDR, ICAO: VAUD) is a domestic airport serving Udaipur, Rajasthan, India. It is situated at Dabok, located 22 km (14 mi) east of Udaipur. The airport is named after Maharana Pratap, who was a prominent Maharana (ruler) of the princely state of Mewar, in north-western India.

The airstrip was used for the first time when a 4-seater Piper Super Cub landed in the airport on 16 November 1957. The airport's new passenger terminal commenced operations in February 2008.

Beside the existing terminal, a new, larger terminal is being constructed to meet the rapidly rising traffic and demands. Its foundation stone was laid by Prime Minister Narendra Modi in October 2023, and construction began in the same month. Once completed by the expected deadline of June 2026, the airport will begin operations to foreign destinations to become an international airport.

== Structure ==
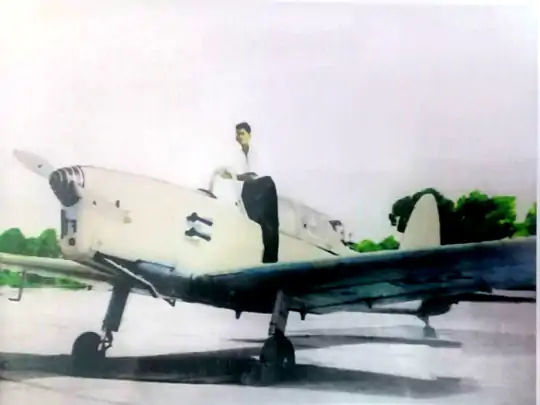
The 4-seater Piper aircraft landed first time at Maharana Pratap Airport on 16 November 1957

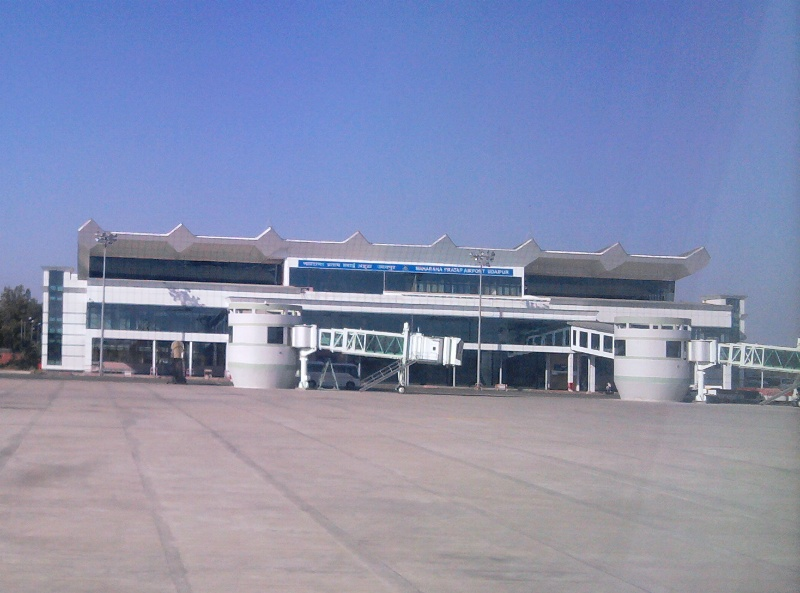
View of the terminal from the apron

The airport is spread over 504 acres. It has one 2,743 metre long runway. Its 250 by 150-metre apron provides parking space for five Boeing 737 and Airbus A320 type aircraft at a time. A new apron is also constructed on the left side of the existing apron for executive and private aircraft. The new terminal building, measuring 12,000 sq.m., was constructed at a cost of ₹80 crore. The terminal has two aerobridges, 4 check-in counters and can handle 600 passengers during peak hours. The airport is equipped with modern navigational and landing aids like Distance Measuring Equipment (DME), DVOR, and Non-Directional Beacon (NDB) and is equipped with a CAT-I Instrument Landing System (ILS).

== Airlines and destinations ==
Airlines	Destinations	Refs.
Air India	Mumbai	
Air India Express	Bengaluru, Delhi	
Akasa Air	Bengaluru (begins 15 October 2026), Mumbai	
IndiGo	Bengaluru, Bhopal, Delhi, Hyderabad, Indore, Jaipur, Mumbai, Navi Mumbai, Noida, Surat	
SpiceJet	Kolkata	

== See also ==
- Airports in India
- Udaipur
- Udaipur City Bus Depot
- Udaipur City railway station
