= Surajpole (Udaipur) =

- Interactive map of Surajpole
- Coordinates: 24.578312°N 73.6922845°E
- Country: India
- State: Rajasthan
- District: Udaipur district
- City: Udaipur

Surajpole is a locality in the Udaipur city of Rajasthan state. This is one of the largest and most populated market in the city.

== History ==
Udaipur was one time surrounded by the City Wall of Udaipur, called in Hindi Parkota. Surajpole Darvaja or Surajpole is one entry gate among seven, the others being Hathipole, Udiapole, Chandpole, DelhiGate, and so on.

== General ==
It is situated in the heart of the city, just 0.5 km away from the Udaipur City Bus Depot and 1 km from Udaipur City railway station. Surajpole junction is approached from Delhi Gate and connects with Udiapole Circle, which is around 530 m away. It is a center point for many adjoining markets, namely Bapu Bazar, Dhaan Mandi, Kalaji Goraji, Gulab Bagh, Ziniret ka Chowk etc. This area has a mixed land use, having elements of residential, commercial and institutional use. Bapu Bazar is a popular market for shopping, with showrooms for things like clothing, crockery, gadgets, shoes school uniforms and khadi products, while also offering local vendor shops for Indian fast food, like kachori, samosa, pani-puri etc. Dhaan Mandi is popular for raw and processed Indian spices. Kalaji Goraji is considered a peaceful residential area.

== See also ==
- Udaipur
- Chandpole
- Udiapole
