= Ananya Express =

Train in India

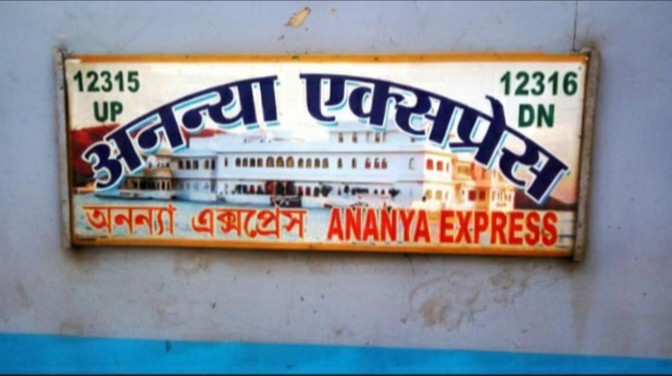

Overview
- Service type: Superfast Express
- First service: 3 January 2000; 26 years ago
- Current operator: Eastern Railway

Route
- Termini: Kolkata (KOAA); Udaipur City (UDZ)
- Stops: 20
- Distance travelled: 2,134 km (1,326 mi)
- Average journey time: 35 hrs 35 mins as 12315; 37 hrs 45 mins as 12316
- Service frequency: Weekly
- Train number: 12315 / 12316

On-board services
- Classes: AC First Class, AC 2 Tier, AC 3 Tier, Sleeper Class, General Unreserved
- Seating arrangements: Yes
- Sleeping arrangements: Yes
- Catering facilities: On board catering, E-catering
- Observation facilities: Large windows
- Baggage facilities: No
- Other facilities: Below the seats

Technical
- Rolling stock: LHB coach
- Track gauge: Broad Gauge
- Operating speed: 60 km/h (37 mph) as 12315 & 56.75 km/h (35.26 mph) as 12316 including halts
Route map
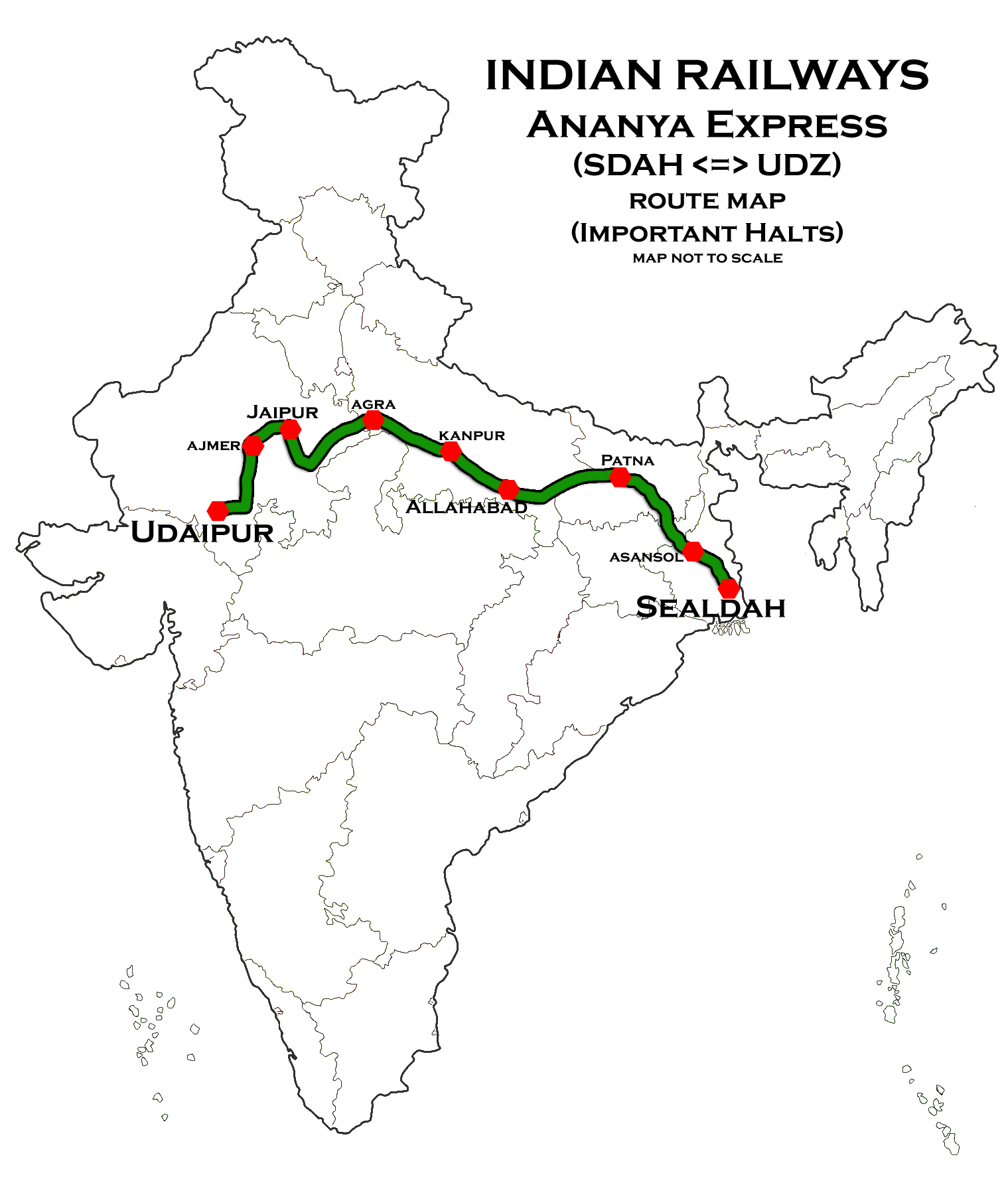

The 12315 / 12316 Ananya Express is an Indian Railways Express-class train running between Kolkata and Udaipur city. It covers a distance of 2134 km in 35 hrs 35 mins at an average speed of 60 km per hour, travelling through the Indian states of West Bengal, Jharkhand, Bihar, Uttar Pradesh and Rajasthan. It connects Eastern India with tourist spots such as Agra, Jaipur, Ajmer and Udaipur. Extension to Asarva near Ahmedabad has been sought post Udaipur-Dungarpur-Himmatnagar-Ahmedabad new Broad Gauge line from Meter Gauge is made. In return, the train covers 2134 km in 37 hrs 45 mins at an average speed of 56.75 km per hour.

== History ==
The service formerly was introduced in 2000 between Sealdah and Ajmer via Bardhaman, Durgapur, Asansol, Patna, Prayagraj, Kanpur, Agra, Sawai Madhopur & Jaipur. But in 2009/10, it was extended through to Udaipur post Ajmer-Udaipur Broad Gauge line from Meter Gauge was made. WAP-7 class Electric locomotive of Indian Railways hauls this train. It is converted in LHB train it has general, sleeper, AC 3tier, AC 2tier, first AC. Now the train's originating station has also been shifted to Kolkata. Now the train runs from Kolkata to Udaipur.

== Traction ==
The train is hauled by a Howrah Loco Shed or Sealdah Loco Shed-based WAP-7 electric locomotive from Kolkata to Udaipur City and vice versa.
