= Udiapole =

Coordinates: 24.5765511°N 73.6988033°E

Udiapol is a locality in the city of Udaipur in the Rajasthan state of India. and Udaipur City Bus Depot Bus stand is also there on Udiapol and Udaipur City railway station is 400 meters away from here.

== General ==
Udaipur was once surrounded by the city wall of Udaipur, called in Hindi Parkota. Udiapol Darvaza or Udiapol is one entry gate among seven. It is a central point for many adjoining markets, including Patel Circle, Reti Stand, Surajpol, Kalaji Goraji, Gulab Bagh.
