= Udaipur City Bus Depot =

General information
- Location: Udaipole, Station Road, Central Bus Stand Area, Udaipur – 313001; India
- Coordinates: 24.57678°N 73.7008551°E
- System: Bus stand
- Owner: RSRTC
- Operator: RSRTC

Construction
- Structure type: At Grade
- Platform levels: 1st
- Parking: Yes
- Cycle facilities: Yes

History
- Opened: 24×7
- Closed: Nil

Services
daily
Location
- Location within Rajasthan Location within India

Udaipur City Bus Depot is a Rajasthan Roadways Bus Depot in Udaipur, Rajasthan, India. It is the central bus stand for the Rajasthan State Road Transport Corporation, and have lines running for majority of other destinations in Rajasthan and further north and west towards Madhya Pradesh and Gujarat. Major cities connected by direct bus services from the depot are Delhi, Mumbai, Ahmedabad, Jaipur, Agra, Mathura, Ajmer, Jodhpur, Surat, Kota etc. There is Rajasthan Roadways Deluxe, Super deluxe and AC buses as well as private travels also available from the major cities.

== See also ==
- Udaipur
- Udaipur City railway station
- Udaipur Airport
