= Udaipur City railway station =

Railway Station in Rajasthan, India

UDAIPUR CITY

- Udaipur City railway station

General information
- Location: NH-8, Jawahar Nagar, Udaipur, Rajasthan; India
- Coordinates: 24.5685354°N 73.6998224°E
- Elevation: 583 metres (1,913 ft)
- System: Indian Railway Station
- Owner: Indian Railways
- Operator: North Western Railways
- Lines: Udaipur–Chittorgarh section, Udaipur–Mavli–Marwar line, Aasrva–Udaipur line
- Platforms: 5
- Tracks: 9
- Connections: Taxi stand, Autorickshaw

Construction
- Structure type: Standard (on ground station)
- Parking: Yes
- Cycle facilities: Yes
- Accessible: Available

Other information
- Status: Functioning
- Station code: UDZ
- Zone(s): North Western Railway zone
- Division(s): Ajmer
Location
- Location within Rajasthan Location within India
- Interactive map

Udaipur City railway station (station code: UDZ) is a railway station located in Udaipur, Rajasthan, India. The railway station is under the administrative control of North Western Railway of Indian Railways.

== Overview ==
Udaipur City Railway Station has six platforms and a total of eight tracks. It is situated on the Udaipur Road, around 2.5 km from the city center, and around 25 km from Udaipur Airport. To decongest the main Udaipur City Railway Station, the suburban station Rana Pratap Nagar railway station is developed as the second main station for passenger trains and Umarda Railway Station will be the third Railway Station of Udaipur.

=== The Living Wall ===
Udaipur City Railway Station is set to get a Living Wall, which is a self-sufficient vertical garden attached to the exterior or interior of the building. Initiated by the Railway and UIT, this project covered and converted a barren wall of 1,400 square feet into a beautiful green space. This project included installation of metal sheet frames (MS), followed by plantation in specially designed GI panels (Galvanized iron) hanging on the MS frame. Organic fertilizers have been used to grow plants to avoid overweight on the wall. The project costed approximately Rs 13.5 lakh, and took 14 days to complete.

== Important trains ==
The following trains start from Udaipur City Railway Station:

Train No.	Train name
26963/26964	Udaipur City–Asarva (Ahmedabad) Vande Bharat Express
12315/12316	Udaipur City - Kolkata Ananya Express
19601/19602	Udaipur City - New Jalpaiguri Weekly Express
19327/19328	Udaipur City - Ratlam Express
12991/12992	Udaipur City - Jaipur Intercity Express
19605/19606	Udaipur City - Madar Passenger
19609/19610	Udaipur City - Yog Nagari Rishikesh Express
59835/59836	Udaipur City - Mandsor Passenger
19615/19616	Udaipur City - Kamakhya Kavi Guru Express
20473/20474	Udaipur City - Delhi Sarai Rohilla Chetak Express
12963/12964	Udaipur City - Hazrat Nizamuddin Mewar Express
59605/59606	Udaipur City - Bari Sadri Passenger
20971/20972	Udaipur City - Shalimar Weekly Express
19315/19316	Asarva - Indore Veer Bhumi Express
19667/19668	Udaipur City - Mysuru Palace Queen Humsafar Express
19669/19670	Udaipur City - Patliputra Humsafar Express
22985/22986	Udaipur City - Delhi Sarai Rohilla Rajasthan Humsafar Express
22901/22902	Udaipur City - Bandra Terminus Tri-weekly SF Express
19665/19666	Udaipur City - Khajuraho Express
20989/20990	Udaipur City - Chandigarh SF Express
20987/20988	Udaipur City - Asarva Intercity SF Express

== See also ==
- Udaipur
- Udaipur Airport
- Udaipur City Bus Depot
- Rana Pratap Nagar railway station
