= Getor Jagatpura railway station =

Railway Station in Rajasthan, India

Getor Jagatpura Railway Station

General information
- Location: Jagatpura, Jaipur, Rajasthan; India
- Coordinates: 26.5013°N 75.4953°E
- Elevation: 389 metres (1,276 ft)
- Owner: Indian Railways
- Operator: North Western Railway
- Platforms: 2
- Tracks: 4
- Connections: Auto stand

Construction
- Structure type: Standard (on ground station)
- Parking: Yes
- Cycle facilities: Yes

Other information
- Status: Functioning
- Station code: GTJT
- Zone(s): North Western Railway
- Division(s): Jaipur
Location
- Location within Rajasthan

Getor Jagatpura Railway Station is a railway station in Jaipur district, Rajasthan. Its code is GTJT. It serves Jagatpura area of Jaipur city.

== Major trains ==
Some of the important trains that run from Getor Jagatpura are:

- Jaipur–Hisar Passenger (unreserved)
- Ajmer–Chandigarh Garib Rath Express
- Ajmer–Amritsar Express (via Firozpur)
- Amritsar–Ajmer Express (via Dhuri)
- Agra Fort–Ajmer Intercity Express
- Ala Hazrat Express (via Bhildi)
- Jaipur–Alwar Express
- Ala Hazrat Express (via Ahmedabad)
- Mathura–Jaipur Passenger (unreserved)

FACILITY AVAILABLE

- amul stall
- ticket vending machine in reservation office near platform 2
- autostand outside platform 1
- RPF substation

== See also ==
- Jaipur district
- Durgapura railway station
- Gandhinagar Jaipur railway station
- Jaipur Junction railway station
