= Ajmer–Amritsar Express =

Train in India

Overview
- Service type: Express
- First service: 2007; 19 years ago
- Current operator: North Western Railway

Route
- Termini: Ajmer Junction (AII); Amritsar (ASR)
- Stops: 29 as 19611/19612, 24 as 19613/19614
- Distance travelled: 1,009 km (627 mi) as 19611/19612, 849 km (528 mi) as 19613/19614
- Average journey time: 20 hours 40 mins as 19611/19612, 16 hours 30 mins as 19613/19614
- Service frequency: Bi-weekly
- Train numbers: 19611 / 19612, 19613 / 19614

On-board services
- Classes: Sleeper Class, AC First Class, AC 2 Tier, AC 3 Tier, General Unreserved
- Seating arrangements: Yes
- Sleeping arrangements: Yes
- Catering facilities: E-Catering only
- Observation facilities: Large windows
- Baggage facilities: No
- Other facilities: Below the seats

Technical
- Rolling stock: LHB coach
- Track gauge: 1,676 mm (5 ft 6 in)
- Operating speed: 50 km/h (31 mph) average including halts as 19611/19612, 52 km/h (32 mph) average including halts as 19613/19614.

The Ajmer–Amritsar Express is an express train belonging to North Western Railway zone of Indian Railways that run between Ajmer Junction and Amritsar Junction in India.

== Background ==
This line was announced on the 2006-07 Rail budget, by Lalu Prasad Yadav (Former Minister of Railways) as a Jaipur–Amritsar Express with bi-weekly frequency of both sets, having numbers of 19771/72 (1st set) & 19781/82 (2nd set) with termination at Jaipur Junction & Amritsar Junction. which it makes direct connectivity for state capital of Rajasthan & famous holy place of Punjab.

Both sets were run till 23 February 2013 and thereafter 24 February 2013 it was extended to Ajmer Junction after the approval of North Western Railway for the demand of people of direct connectivity of both holy places and also the number of trains was changed to 19611/12 (1st set) & 19613/14 (2nd set).

== Service ==
The 1st set of this line covers the distance of 1008 km with an average speed of 50 km/h and 2nd set of this line covers a distance of 849 km with an average speed of 52 km/h.

== Routes & halts ==
- Train number 19611/19612 runs from Ajmer Junction via Kishangarh, Phulera Junction, Jaipur Junction, Dausa, Bandikui Junction, Alwar, Khairthal, Rewari, Bhiwani, Hisar, Sirsa, Bathinda Junction, Faridkot, Firozpur Cantonment, Moga, Ludhiana, Jalandhar City, Beas Junction to Amritsar Junction.
- Train number 19613/19614 runs from Ajmer Junction via Kishangarh, Phulera Junction, Jaipur Junction, Dausa, Bandikui Junction, Alwar, Khairthal, Rewari, Bhiwani, Hisar, Jakhal Junction, Sangrur, Dhuri Junction, Ludhiana, Jalandhar City, Beas Junction to Amritsar Junction.

== Traction ==
As this route of both sets is yet to be electrified, an Abu Road Loco Shed-based WDM-3A or Bhagat Ki Kothi Loco Shed-based WDP-4 / WDP-4B / WDP-4D diesel locomotives pulls the train to its destination on both sides.

== Direction reversal ==
- Train number 19611/19612 reverses its direction once at; Firozpur Cantonment,
- Train number 19613/19614 reverses its direction once at; Hisar Junction.
