= Ala Hazrat Express (via Bhildi) =

Train in India

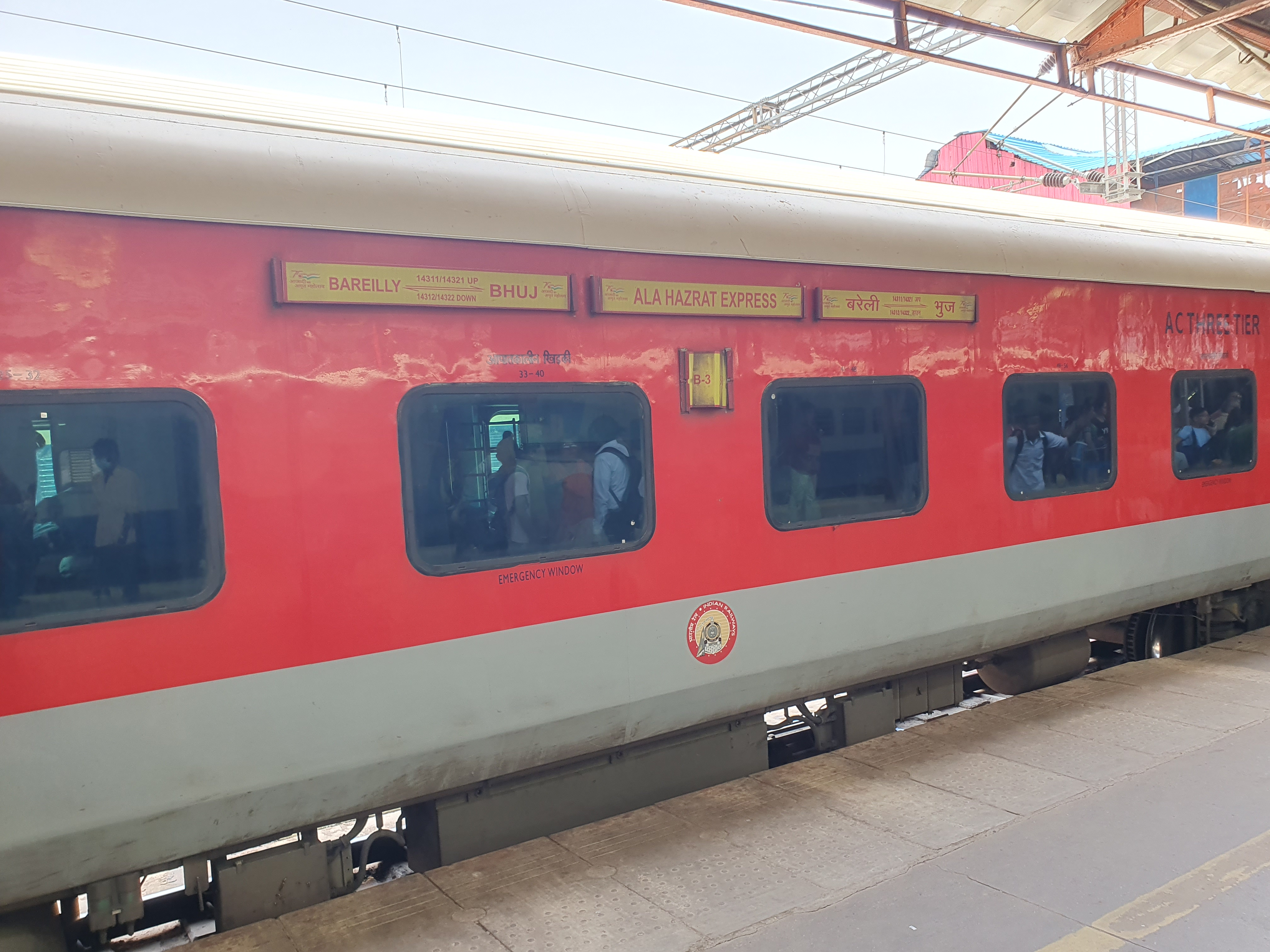
- Ala Hazrat Express at Delhi Junction.

Overview
- Service type: Express
- Locale: Gujarat, Rajasthan, Haryana, Delhi & Uttar Pradesh
- Current operator: Northern Railway

Route
- Termini: Bareilly (BE); Bhuj (BHUJ)
- Stops: 44
- Distance travelled: 1,412 km (877 mi)
- Average journey time: 27h 40m
- Service frequency: 4 days a week
- Train number: 14321 / 14322

On-board services
- Classes: AC 2 tier, AC 3 tier, Sleeper class, General Unreserved
- Seating arrangements: Yes
- Sleeping arrangements: Yes
- Catering facilities: On-board catering, E-catering
- Observation facilities: Large windows
- Baggage facilities: Available
- Other facilities: Below the seats

Technical
- Rolling stock: LHB coach
- Track gauge: 1,676 mm (5 ft 6 in)
- Operating speed: 52 km/h (32 mph) average including halts.
- Rake sharing: 14311/14312 Ala Hazrat Express (via Ahmedabad)

The 14321 / 14322 Ala Hazrat Express (via Bhildi) is an Express train belonging to Northern Railway zone that runs between Bareilly Junction and Bhuj in India. It is currently being operated with 14321/14322 train numbers on a four-day weekly basis.

The train is named in the memory of a reformer of the 19th century Ala Hazrat Ahmed Raza Khan who is famous around the world.

== About the train ==
Ala Hazrat Express

- 14311/14312 Via Mahesana (Running 3 days per week)
- 14321/14322 Via Bhildi (Running 4 days per week)

The Express train belonging to Indian Railways that runs between Bareilly and Bhuj in India. It operates as train number 14311/14321 from Bareilly to Bhuj and as train number 14312/14322 in the reverse direction.

It's coincidence they are arriving same time on Palanpur Junction.

== Service ==
The 14321/Ala Hazrat Express has an average speed of 51 km/h and covers 1412 km in 27h 40m. The 14322/Ala Hazrat Express has an average speed of 51 km/h and covers 1412 km in 27h 35m.

== Route and halts ==
The important stops of the train include:

- Bareilly
- Moradabad
- Ghaziabad
- Old Delhi
- Delhi Cantonment
- Gurgaon
- Rewari
- Alwar
- Bandikui Junction
- Jaipur Junction
- Phulera Junction
- Ajmer Junction
- Marwar Junction
- Abu Road
- Palanpur
- Bhildi Junction
- Bhachau
- Gandhidham Junction
- Anjar
- Bhuj

== Coach composition ==
The train has standard LHB rakes with max speed of 130 km/h. The train consists of 22 coaches:

- 1 AC II Tier
- 4 AC III Tier
- 10 Sleeper coaches
- 5 General
- 2 Seating cum Luggage Rake

== Traction ==
As the route is fully electrified, it is hauled by a Ghaziabad Loco Shed based WAP-5 / WAP-7 electric locomotive from end to end.

== Direction reversal ==
Train reverses its direction 1 times:

- Gandhidham Junction

== Rake sharing ==
The train shares its rake with 14311/14312 Ala Hazrat Express (via Mahesana).

== See also ==
- Bareilly Junction railway station
- Bhuj railway station
- Ala Hazrat Express (via Ahmedabad)
