= Khadki (Pune)–Dahar Ka Balaji (Jaipur) Superfast Express =

Train in India

Khadki (Pune) - Dahar Ka Balaji (Jaipur) Superfast Express

Overview
- Service type: Superfast
- Status: Active
- Locale: Maharashtra, Gujarat, Madhya Pradesh and Rajasthan
- First service: 11 October 2026; 15 days' time
- Current operator: Central Railway (CR)

Route
- Termini: Khadki (KK); Dahar Ka Balaji (DKBJ)
- Stops: 19
- Distance travelled: 1,294 km (804 mi)
- Average journey time: 23h 05m
- Service frequency: Weekly
- Train number: 20105 / 20106

On-board services
- Classes: General Unreserved, Sleeper Class, AC 3rd Class, AC 2nd Class
- Seating arrangements: Yes
- Sleeping arrangements: Yes
- Catering facilities: Pantry Car; On-board Catering; E-Catering
- Observation facilities: Large windows
- Baggage facilities: No
- Other facilities: Below the seats

Technical
- Rolling stock: LHB coach
- Track gauge: 1,676 mm (5 ft 6 in)
- Electrification: 25 kV 50 Hz AC overhead line
- Operating speed: 56 km/h (35 mph) average including halts.
- Track owner: Indian Railways

The 20105 / 20106 Khadki (Pune)–Dahar Ka Balaji (Jaipur) Superfast Express is an Superfast Express train belonging to Central Railway zone that runs between Khadki (Pune) and Dahar Ka Balaji (Jaipur) in India.

== Schedule ==
- 20105 – 9:45 AM (Sunday) [Khadki]
- 20106 – 12:00 PM (Monday) [Dahar Ka Balaji]

== Routes and halts ==
The important halts of the train are :

- Khadki
- Lonavala
- Kalyan Junction
- Vasai Road
- Palghar
- Vapi
- Valsad
- Surat
- Ankleshwar Junction
- Vadodara Junction
- Ratlam Junction
- Nagda Junction
- Bhawani Mandi
- Ramganj Mandi Junction
- Kota Junction
- Sawai Madhopur Junction
- Durgapura
- Jaipur Junction
- Dahar Ka Balaji

== Traction ==
As the entire route is fully electrified it is hauled by a Pune Loco Shed-based WAP-7 electric locomotive from Khadki to Dahar Ka Balaji and vice versa.

== Rake reversal or rake share ==
The train will reverse 1 time :

1. Sawai Madhopur Junction

== See also ==
No trains from Khadki

No trains from Dahar Ka Balaji

== Notes ==
a. Runs a day in a week with both directions.
