= Ala Hazrat Express (via Mahesana) =

Train in India

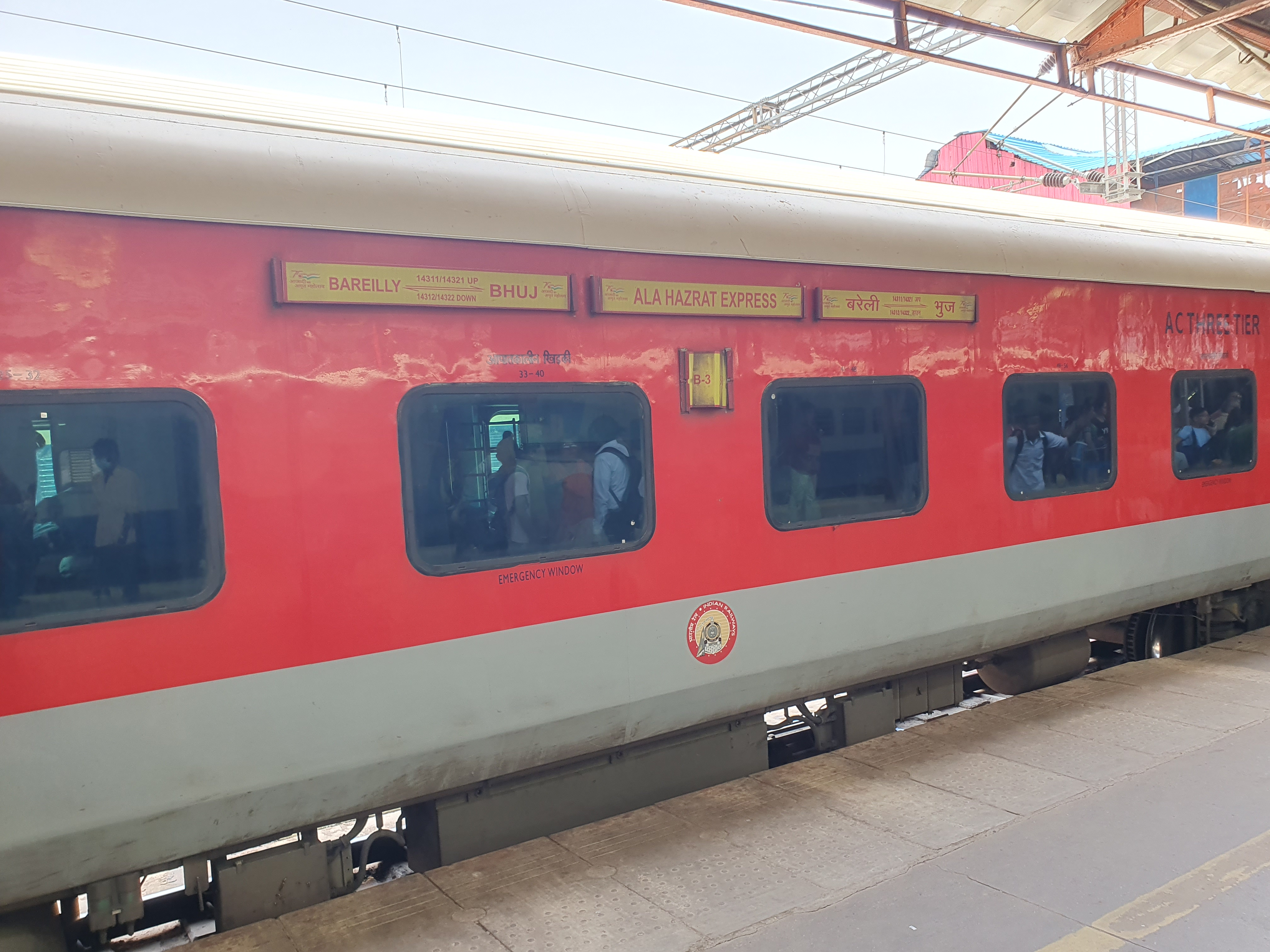
- Ala Hazrat Express at Delhi Junction.

Overview
- Service type: Express
- Locale: Gujarat, Rajasthan, Haryana, Delhi & Uttar Pradesh
- Current operator: Northern Railways

Route
- Termini: Bareilly (BE); Bhuj (BHUJ)
- Stops: 41
- Distance travelled: 1,543 km (959 mi)
- Average journey time: 31h 50m
- Service frequency: 3 Days a week
- Train number: 14311 / 14312

On-board services
- Classes: AC 2 tier, AC 3 tier, Sleeper Class, General Unreserved
- Seating arrangements: Yes
- Sleeping arrangements: Yes
- Catering facilities: On-board catering, E-catering
- Observation facilities: Large windows
- Baggage facilities: Available
- Other facilities: Below the seats

Technical
- Rolling stock: LHB coach
- Track gauge: 1,676 mm (5 ft 6 in)
- Operating speed: 53 km/h (33 mph) average including halts.
- Rake sharing: 14321/14322 Ala Hazrat Express (via Bhildi)

The 14311 / 14312 Ala Hazrat Express (via Mahesana) had been started in the memory of Ala Hazrat Ahmed Raza Khan, a reformer of the 19th century.

== About the train ==
Ala Hazrat Express

- 14311/14312 Via Mahesana (Running 3 days per week)
- 14321/14322 Via Bhildi (Running 4 days per week)

The Express train belonging to Indian Railways that runs between Bareilly and Bhuj in India. It operates as train number 14311/14321 from Bareilly to Bhuj and as train number 14312/14322 in the reverse direction.

It's coincidence they are arriving same time on Palanpur Junction.

== Coach composition ==
The train has standard LHB rakes with max speed of 130 km/h. The train consists of 22 coaches:

1 AC II Tier 4 AC III Tier 10 Sleeper coaches 5 General 2 Seating cum Luggage Rake

== Service ==
The Ala Hazrat Express covers the distance of 1543 km in 32 hours as 14312/14311 & 1410 km in 28 hours 10 mins as 14322/14321.

== Route and halts ==
The important stops of the train include:

- Bareilly
- Moradabad
- Ghaziabad
- Old Delhi
- Delhi Cantonment
- Gurgaon
- Rewari
- Alwar
- Bandikui Junction
- Jaipur Junction
- Phulera Junction
- Ajmer Junction
- Marwar Junction
- Abu Road
- Palanpur Junction
- Mahesana Junction
- Chandlodiya (Ahmedabad)
- Viramgam
- Bhachau
- Gandhidham Junction
- Anjar
- Bhuj

== Traction ==
As the route is fully electrified, it is hauled by a Ghaziabad Loco Shed based WAP-5 / WAP-7 electric locomotive from end to end.

== Rake sharing ==
The train shares its rake with 14321/14322 Ala Hazrat Express (via Bhildi).

== Direction reversal ==
It reverses one time at,

- Gandhidham Junction.

== Arrival and departure time ==
Ala Hazrat Express 14311 leaves from its source point, Bareilly (BE) at 06:35 AM and reach its destination Bhuj at 02:00 PM next day. Ala Hazrat Express 14312 leaves Bhuj at 12.25 PM and reach Bareilly (BE)at 08:30 PM next day. During its journey it travels via 42 stations before reaching its destination.

== See also ==
- Bareilly Junction railway station
- Bhuj railway station
- Ala Hazrat Express (via Bhildi)
