= Prayagraj–Jaipur Express =

Train in India

Prayagraj–Lalgarh Express

Overview
- Service type: Express
- First service: 1 July 2007; 18 years ago
- Current operator: North Central Railway

Route
- Termini: Prayagraj Junction (PRYJ); Lalgarh Junction (LGH)
- Stops: 27
- Distance travelled: 1,183 km (735 mi)
- Average journey time: 21 hours 15 minutes
- Service frequency: 4 days a week
- Train number: 12403 / 12404

On-board services
- Classes: AC first, AC 2 tier, AC 3 tier, Sleeper, General Unreserved
- Seating arrangements: Yes
- Sleeping arrangements: Yes
- Catering facilities: On-board catering, E-catering
- Observation facilities: Large windows
- Baggage facilities: Available
- Other facilities: Below the seats

Technical
- Rolling stock: LHB coach
- Track gauge: 1,676 mm (5 ft 6 in)
- Operating speed: 130 km/h (81 mph) maximum, 60 km/h (37 mph) average including halts.

The 12403 / 12404 Prayagraj–Lalgarh Express is a Superfast train belonging to Indian Railways that runs between Prayagraj Junction and Lalgarh Junction in India. It is a daily service serving the states of Uttar Pradesh and Rajasthan.

It operates as train number 12403 from Prayagraj Junction to Lalgarh Junction and as train number 12404 in the reverse direction.

Previously it used to run till Mathura Junction but now is extended till Jaipur and then Lalgarh Junction.

== Coaches ==
It has 1 AC 1st Class cum AC 2 tier, 1 AC 2 tier, 2 AC 3 tier, 8 Sleeper class, 7 General class coaches with a total of 19 coaches. As with most train services in India, coach composition may be amended at the discretion of Indian Railways depending on demand.

== Service ==
It is a daily train and covers the distance of 782 kilometres in 13 hours 20 mins as 12403 Prayagraj–Jaipur Express (58.94 km/h) and 13 hours 35 mins as 12404 Jaipur–Prayagraj Express (57.07 km/h).

== Traction ==
As the route is now fully electrified, it is hauled by a Kanpur Loco Shed-based WAP-7 electric locomotive from end to end.

== Routeing ==
The 12403 / 12404 Allahabad–Jaipur Express runs from Prayagraj Junction via Kanpur Central, Jhinjhak, Etawah Junction, Agra Cantonment, Mathura Junction, Alwar, Bandikui Junction, Jaipur Junction, Sikar Junction, Churu Junction, Ratangarh Junction, Bikaner Junction to Lalgarh Junction.

== Coach composition ==
The coach composition of the train is

- 1 AC I Tier + II Tier (hybrid)
- 2 AC II Tier
- 6 AC III Tier
- 2 AC III Economy
- 5 Sleeper coaches
- 4 General
- 2 Seating Luggage rake/parcel van

Loco	1	2	3	4	5	6	7	8	9	10	11	12	13	14	15	16	17	18	19	20	20	21
	EOG	GEN	GEN	S1	S2	S3	A1	A2	H1	M1	M2	B1	B2	B3	B4	B5	B6	S4	S5	GEN	GEN	EOG

== Timing ==
- 12403 – Leaves Prayagraj Junction daily at night 11:10 PM and reaches Lalgarh Junction next day at afternoon 12:10 PM IST.
- 12404 – leaves Lalgarh Junction every day at 3:20 PM IST and reaches Prayagraj Junction in early morning 4:45 AM IST.
