= Kanakpura railway station =

Railway station in Rajasthan, India

General information
- Location: Kanakpura, Jaipur, Rajasthan; India
- Coordinates: 26.9292°N 75.7031°E
- Elevation: 429 metres (1,407 ft)
- System: Indian Railways station
- Owner: Indian Railways
- Operator: North Western Railway
- Platforms: 2
- Tracks: 6
- Connections: Auto stand

Construction
- Structure type: Standard (on ground station)
- Parking: Yes
- Cycle facilities: Yes

Other information
- Status: Functioning
- Station code: KKU
- Zone(s): North Western Railway
- Division(s): Jaipur
Location
- Location within Greater Jaipur Location within Rajasthan

Kanakpura railway station is a railway station in Jaipur district, Rajasthan. Its code is KKU. It serves Kanakpura area of Jaipur city. The station consists of 2 platforms. The platform is not well sheltered. It got all water, sanitation and shops nearby. The tempo transportation is also available from there and its next to Jaipur Railway station.

== Major trains ==
Some of the important trains that run from Kanakpura are:

- Bhopal–Jaipur Express
- Jabalpur–Indore Express
- Jaipur–Nagpur Weekly Express
- Jodhpur–Bhopal Passenger
- Jaipur Jn–Suratgarh Jn Passenger (unreserved)
- Ahmedabad–Jaipur Passenger
- Phulera Jn–Jaipur Jn Passenger (unreserved)
- Phulera Ratlam Fast Passenger
- Bayana–Phulera Passenger (unreserved)

== See also ==
- Jaipur district
- Durgapura railway station
- Gandhinagar Jaipur railway station
- Jaipur Junction railway station
