= Bais Godam railway station =

Railway station in Rajasthan, India

Bais Godam

General information
- Location: Raj Bhavan Road, Keshav Nagar, Civil Lines, Jaipur, Rajasthan; India
- Coordinates: 26.9016°N 75.7897°E
- Elevation: 425 metres (1,394 ft)
- System: Indian Railways station
- Owner: Indian Railways
- Operator: North Western Railway
- Platforms: 0
- Tracks: 4
- Connections: None

Construction
- Structure type: Standard (on ground station)
- Parking: No
- Cycle facilities: No
- Accessible: No

Other information
- Status: Grade O (No Train Stops)
- Station code: BSGD
- Zone(s): North Western Railway
- Division(s): Jaipur
Location
- Location within Jaipur Location within Rajasthan

Bais Godam is a small railway station in Jaipur district, Rajasthan. Its code is BSGD. It serves Civil Lines area of Jaipur city. The station consists of two platforms. The platforms are not well sheltered. It lacks many facilities including water and sanitation. The station is main used for loading and unloading goods. It also serves as a yard for coaches of long-distance trains running to and from Jaipur.

Passenger trains used to stop there until the 1990s. Now no passenger trains are scheduled to stop there.

== See also ==
- Durgapura railway station
- Gandhinagar Jaipur railway station
- Jaipur Junction railway station
