= KRH =

KRH or krh may refer to:

- KRH, the DS100 code for Rheinhausen station, North Rhine-Westphalia, Germany
- KRH, the Indian Railways station code for Khairthal railway station, Rajasthan, India
- krh, the ISO 639-3 code for Kurama language, Nigeria
