= Mathura Junction railway station =

Railway Station in Uttar Pradesh, India

Mathura Junction
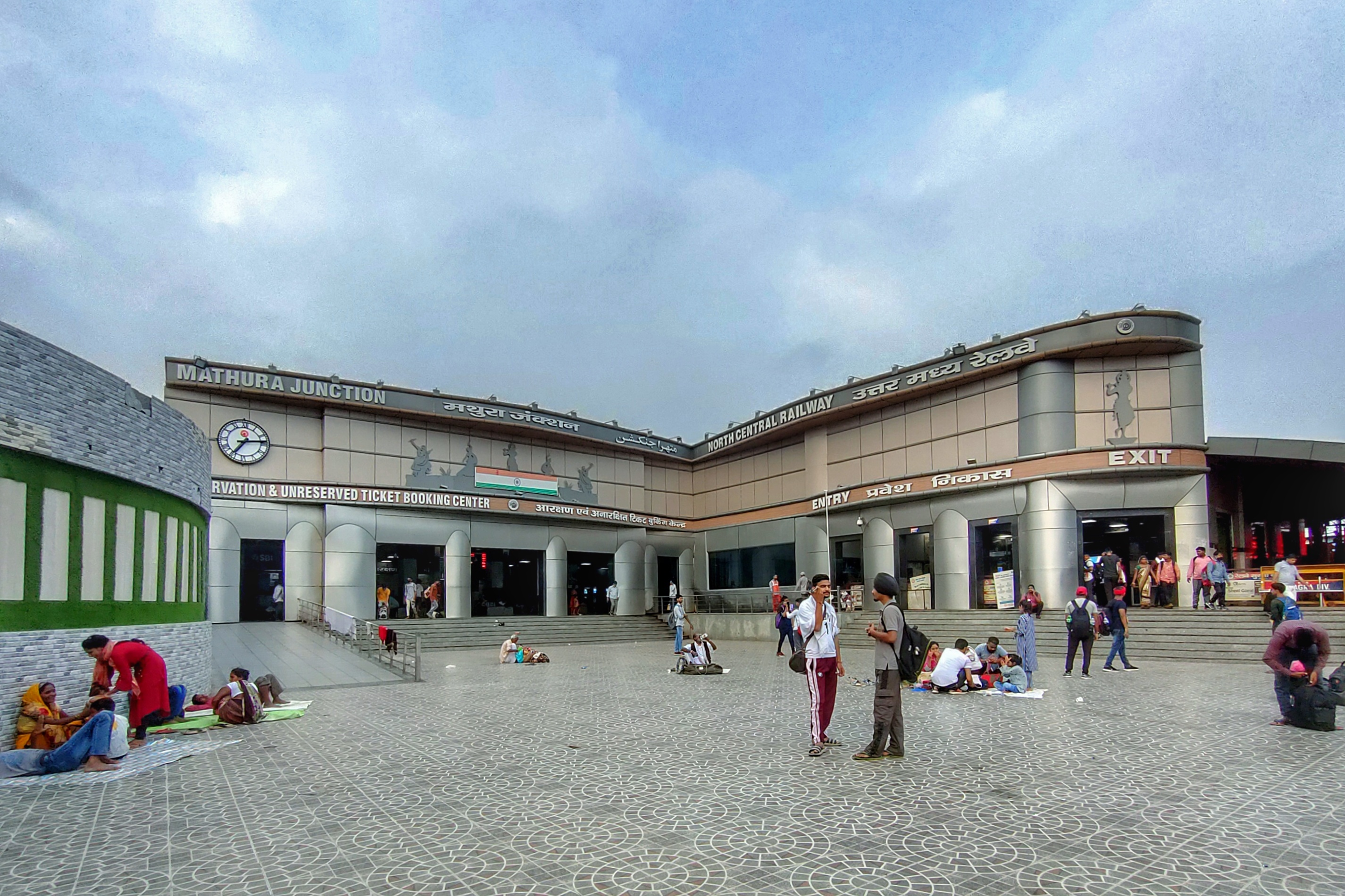
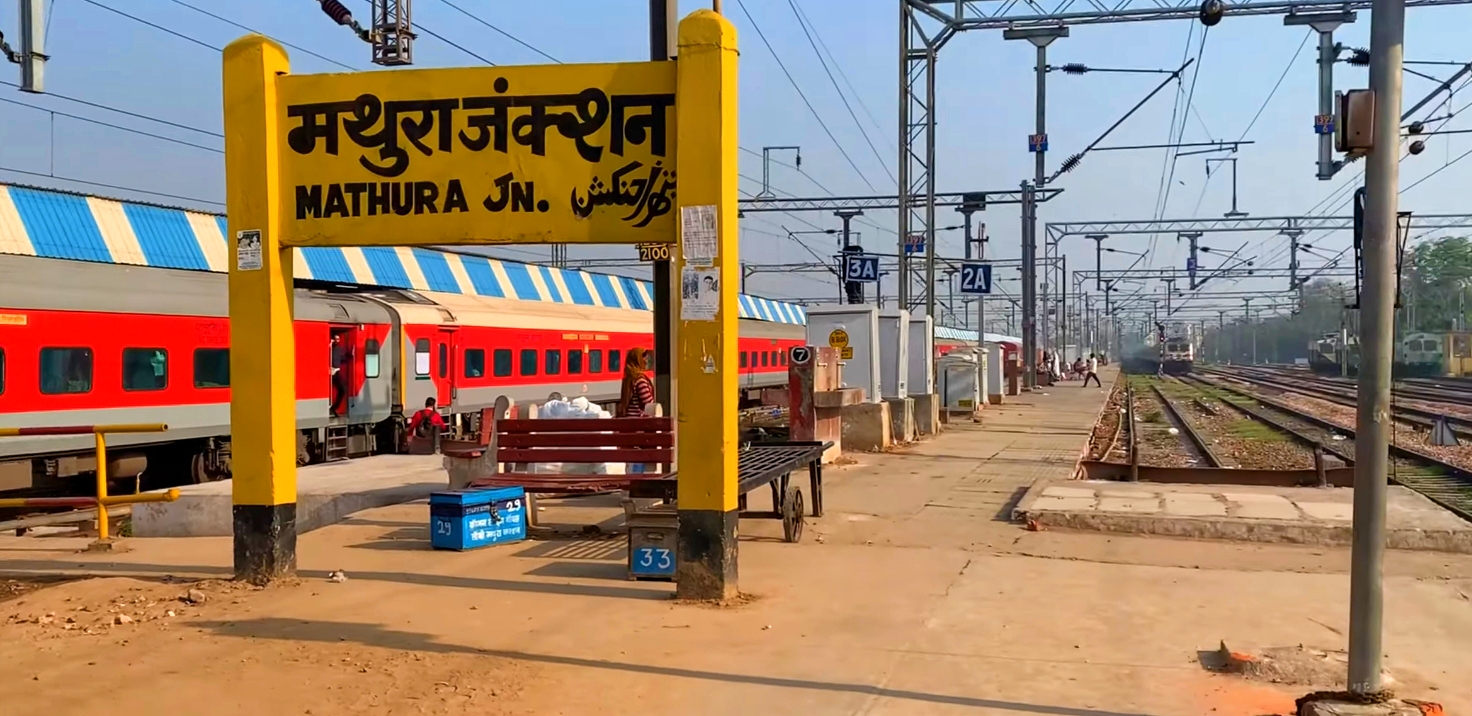
- Mathura Junction railway station

General information
- Location: Mathura, Uttar Pradesh; India
- Coordinates: 27°28′41″N 77°40′20″E
- Elevation: 177.546 metres (582.50 ft)
- System: Indian Railways junction station
- Owner: Indian Railways
- Operator: North Central Railway
- Lines: New Delhi–Palwal–Mathura section, New Delhi–Mumbai main line, New Delhi–Chennai main line, Mathura–Agra section, Mathura–Alwar line
- Platforms: 14
- Tracks: 21

Construction
- Structure type: At grade
- Parking: Yes
- Accessible: Overbridge crossing

Other information
- Status: Functioning
- Station code: MTJ
- Zone(s): North Central Railway zone
- Division(s): Agra

History
- Opened: 1904; 122 years ago
- Electrified: Yes (1982–85)
Location
- Location within India Location within Uttar Pradesh
- Interactive map

Mathura Junction railway station (station code: MTJ) is an important station on the Agra–Delhi chord of the Delhi–Mumbai and Delhi–Chennai lines. It is located in Mathura district in the Indian state of Uttar Pradesh. It is one of the many important stations under the jurisdiction of the North Central Railway. It serves the city of Mathura along with the nearby town of Vrindavan.

== Overview ==
Mathura is the birthplace of Lord Krishna He spent his childhood in Vrindavan, 11 km away from Mathura. Therefore, thry remain as major pilgrimage sites for Hindus. Mathura Refinery of the Indian Oil Corporation which is one of the largest oil refineries in India, is located in Mathura.

== History ==
The 29 mi (47 km)-long Hath Road–Mathura Cantt line was opened in 1875 by Bombay, Baroda and Central India Railway. It was transferred to the North Eastern Railway in 1952. The Mathura–Kasganj line was converted from 1,000 mm (3 ft 3 3/8 in)-wide metre gauge to 5 ft 6 in (1,676 mm) broad gauge in 2009.

The 7 mi (11 km)-long metre-gauge Mathura–Vrindavan branch line was opened by Bombay, Baroda and Central Indian Railway on 26 August, 1889. The line was temporarily closed on 17 March, 2023 for conversion to broad-gauge.

The Mathura–Achhnera–Bharatpur- Achhnera Junction to Mathura line was opened on 7 November 1881 by Bombay, Baroda and Central India Railway, spanning a total length of 23 miles. The gauge conversion of the line was completed on the year 2003–04.

Western Railways began construction of the Mathura–Alwar line, spanning a total of 123 kilometres in 1980 and was completed by 1995. The line was inaugurated by former Railway Minister C.K. Jaffer Sharief.

== Station ==
Mathura Junction has a total of 14 platforms. It serves as a junction for southbound and westbound trains. It has connectivity with all major cities in India. There are seven routes/lines Platform 10 is dedicated to Vrindavan metre-gauge trains. As per the 2018 report released by the Quality Council of India (QCI), Mathura Junction station was declared the least clean station among the 75 major stations.

== Electrification ==
The Faridabad–Mathura–Agra section was electrified in 1982–85. The Mathura–Bharatpur–Gangapur city line was electrified in 1985–86.

== Amenities ==
Mathura Junction railway station has a tourist information centre, telephone booths, computerised reservation centre, waiting room, vegetarian and non-vegetarian refreshment rooms, and a book stall. Indian Railways, as part of its station redevelopment initiative, successfully renovated Mathura Junction station, making it more convenient for passengers. The station has new entry and exit gates, and the first-class waiting room for passengers has been revamped by providing new benches. The circulation area of the station has been modified.

== Passengers ==
Mathura Junction is among the top hundred booking stations of Indian Railways. The junction is important, as from here the routes of trains coming from Delhi are bifurcated towards Mumbai and the South Indian cities of Hyderabad, Bangalore and Chennai.

== Incidents ==
On September 28, 2023, a MEMU train collided with a buffer on Platform 2A. The incident was caused by a train lighting staff, who was drunk and busy in his mobile on a video call, operated the train, while at maintenance, at full speed. 1 person was injured.

== Gallery ==
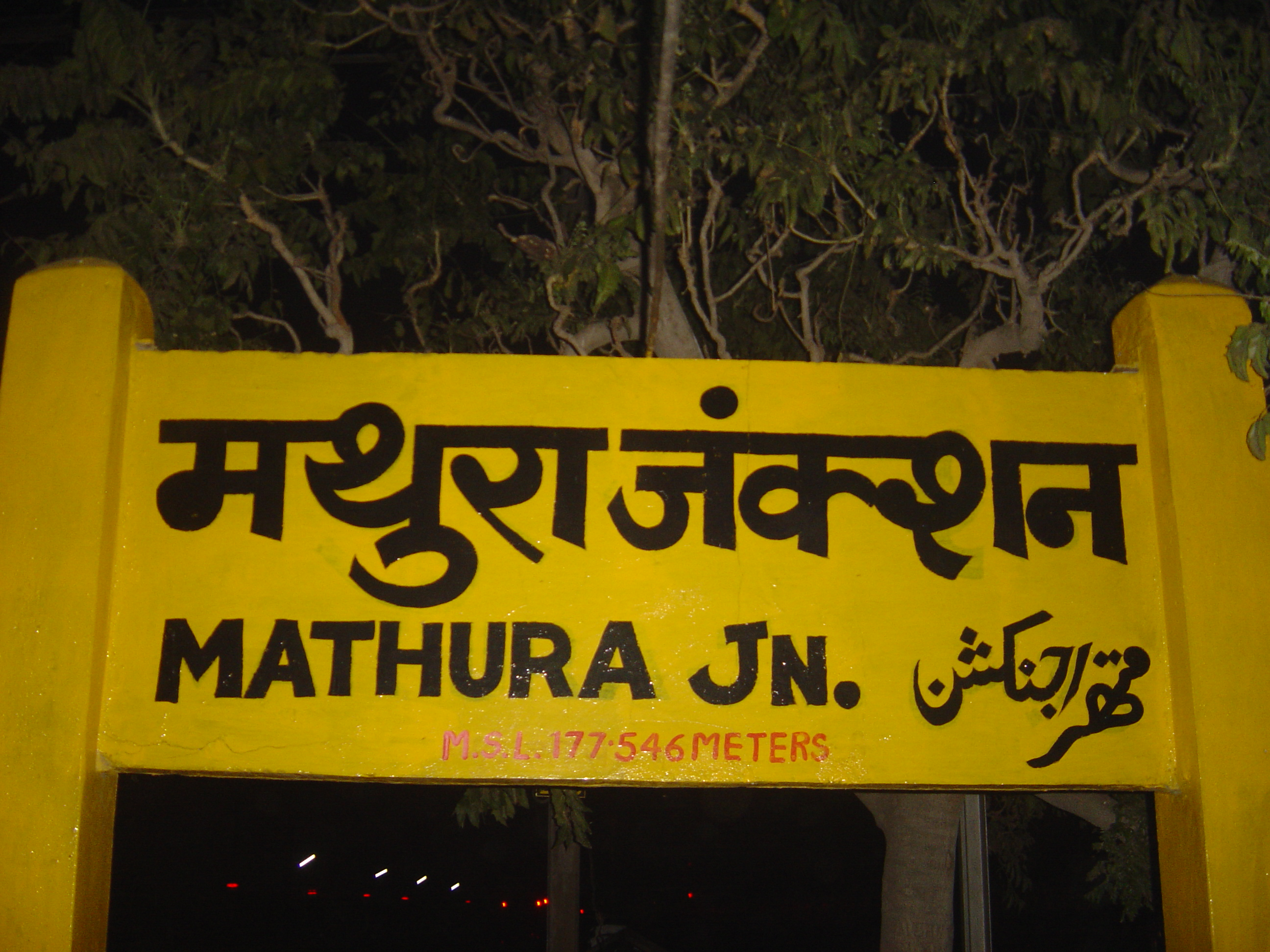
Platform board

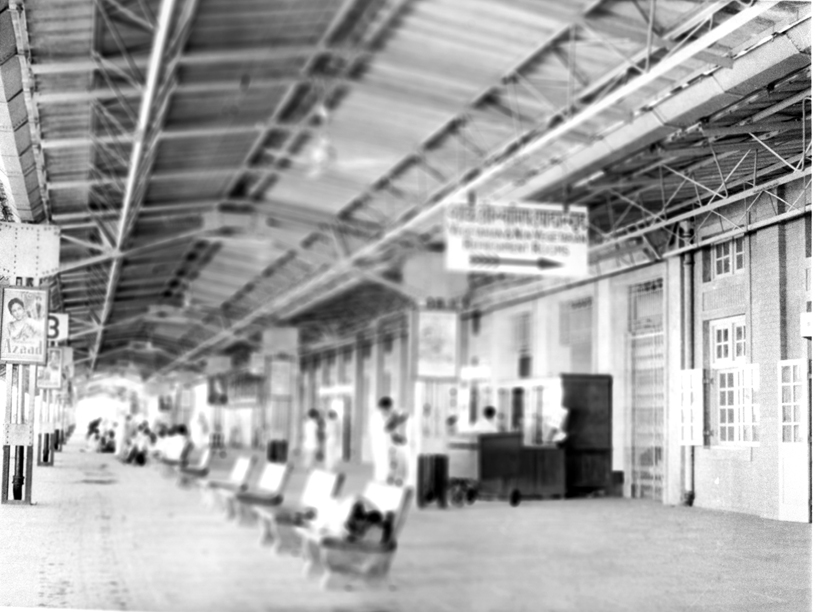
Mathura station remodelled in 1955

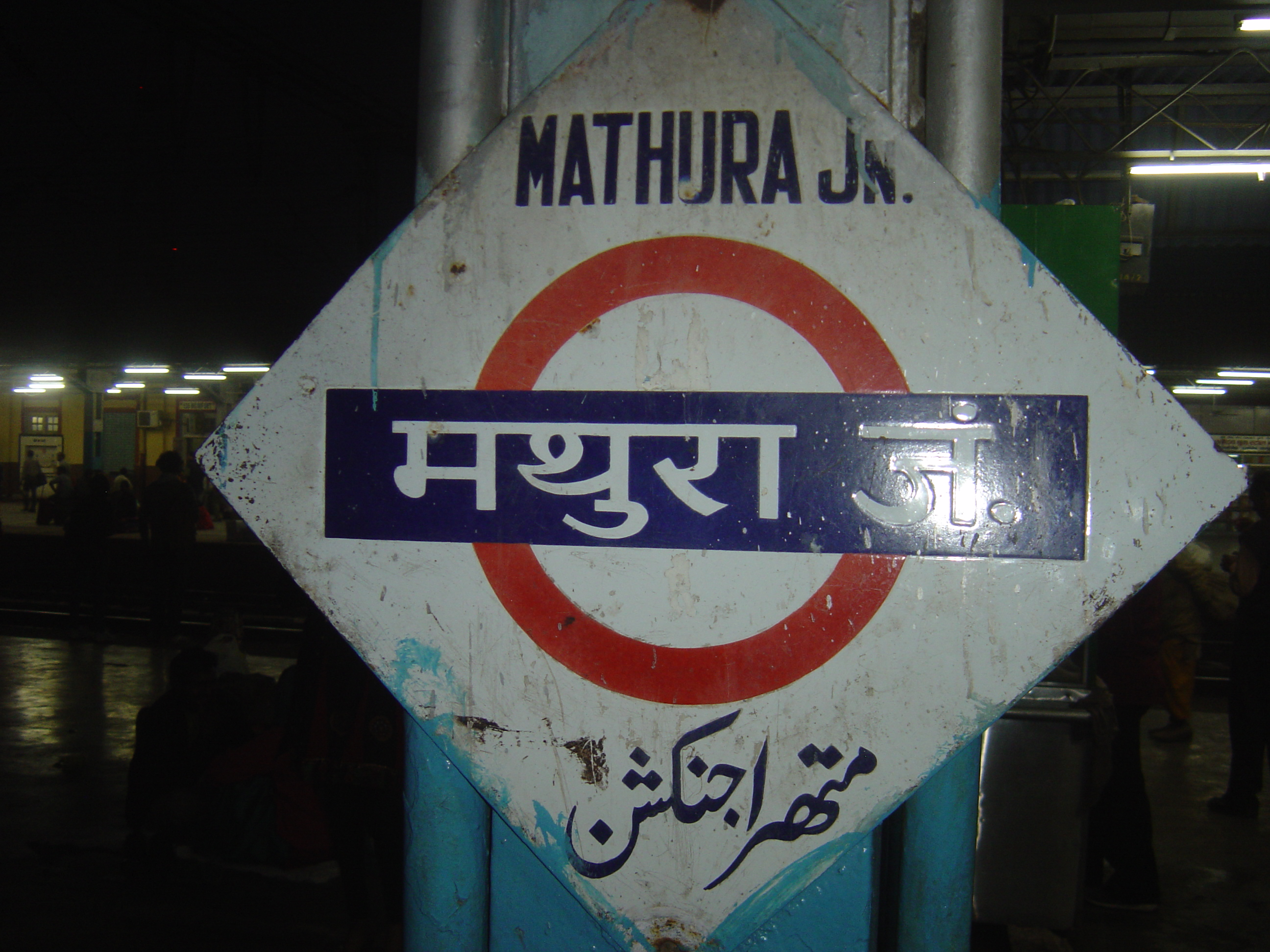
Mathura Junction

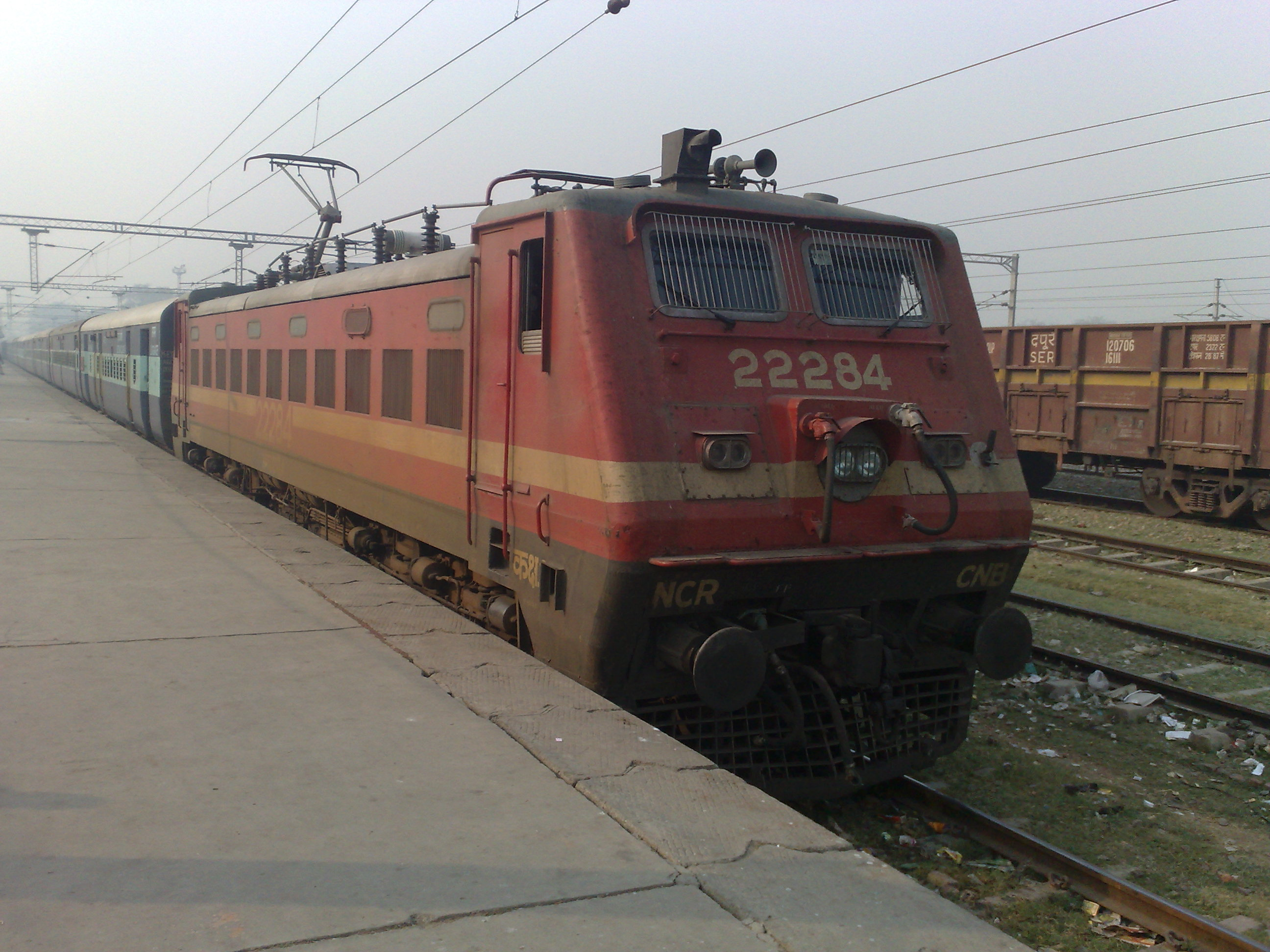
12403 Allahabad Mathura Express at Mathura Junction

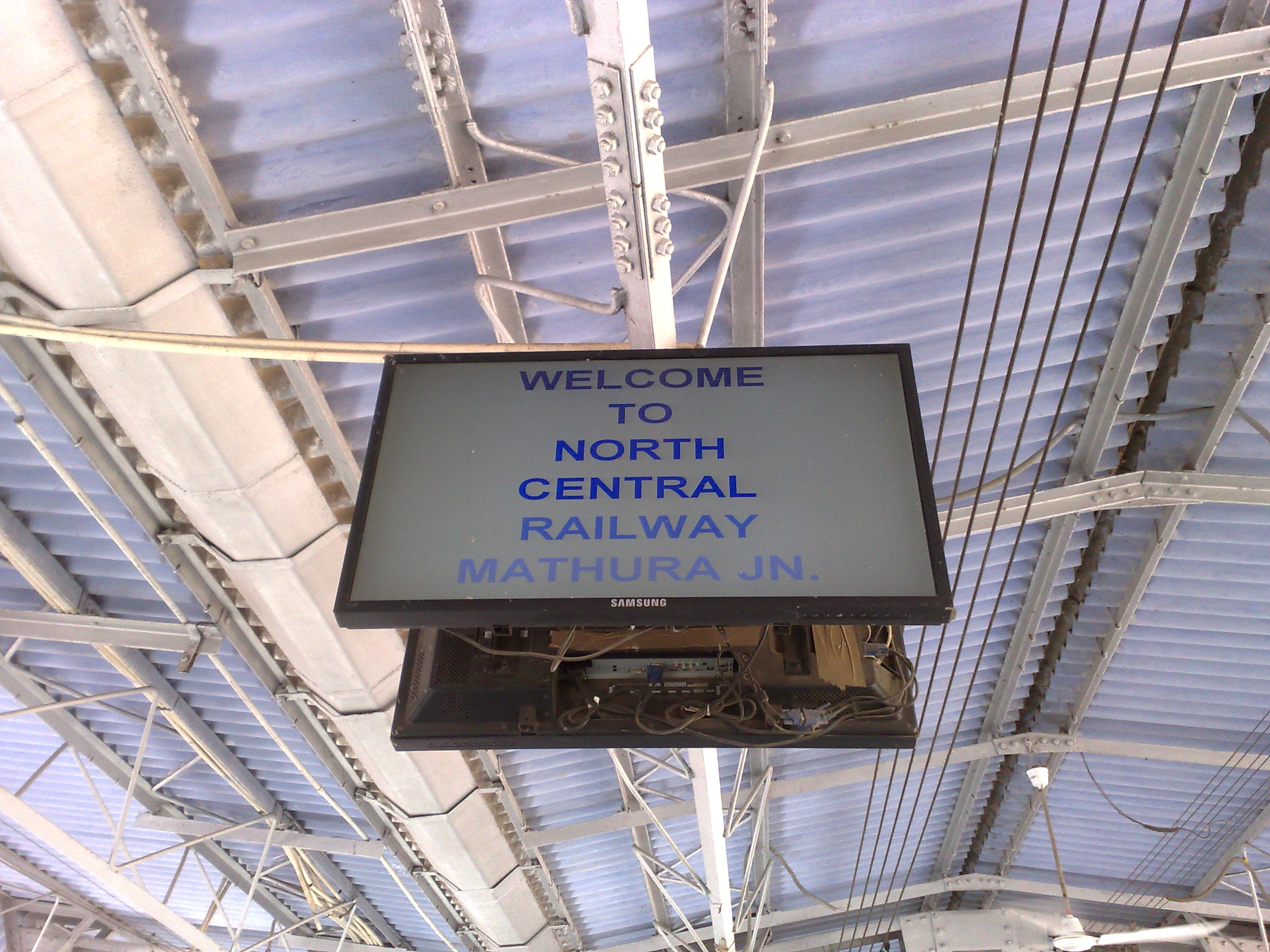
Mathura Junction – Welcome

== See also ==
- Mathura Cantt railway station
- Agra Cantonment railway station
- Hazrat Nizamuddin railway station
- New Delhi railway station

Preceding station	Indian Railways	Following station
Baad towards ?	North Central Railway zone Agra–Delhi chord	Bhuteshwar towards ?
Terminus	North Eastern Railway zone Mathura–Kasganj line	Mathura Cantt towards ?
Terminus	West Central Railway zone Mathura–Kota line	Murhesi Rampur towards ?
Terminus	West Central Railway zone Mathura–Alwar line	Bhuteshwar towards ?
Terminus	North Central Railway zone Mathura–Vrindavan link	Masani towards ?
Terminus	North Central Railway zone Mathura–Achhnera line	Bhainsa towards ?
