= Dahar Ka Balaji railway station =

Railway Station in Rajasthan, India

Dahar Ka Balaji

General information
- Location: Jaipur, Rajasthan; India
- Coordinates: 26.9444°N 75.7659°E
- Elevation: 442 metres (1,450 ft)
- System: Regional rail and Light rail station
- Owner: Indian Railways
- Operator: North Western Railway zone
- Platforms: 3
- Tracks: 4
- Connections: Auto stand

Construction
- Structure type: Standard (on ground station)
- Parking: No
- Cycle facilities: Yes

Other information
- Status: Functioning
- Station code: DKBJ
- Zone(s): North Western Railway zone
- Division(s): Jaipur

History
- Electrified: Fully Electrified
Location
- Location within Jaipur Location within Rajasthan

Dahar Ka Balaji Railway Station is a small railway station in Jaipur district, Rajasthan. Its code is DKBJ. It serves Jaipur city on a broad-gauge line by Jaipur–Churu section. The station consists of three platforms. The platforms are well sheltered. It has many facilities including water and sanitation.

== Maintenance ==
On 1st November, 2015, the station was closed due to gauge conversion work on the rail route between Jaipur and Churu via Sikar.

On 22 Oct 2019, services were started again between Jaipur and Sikar Junction. New DEMU train runs between Jaipur and Sikar Junction via Ringas Junction.

== See also ==
- Jaipur district
- Durgapura railway station
- Gandhinagar Jaipur railway station
- Jaipur Junction railway station
