= Durbalnath =

Indian Saint in Hindu Khatik Community

Sant Shri Durbalnath Ji Maharaj
- idol of Durbalnath ji
- Born: Kalya uncertain, Bichgaav, Alwar, Rajasthan
- Died: uncertain, Rajasthan
- Venerated in: Hinduism

Saint Durbalnath was a nineteenth century Indian Hindu saint. He was born at "Bichgaav" of Alwardistrict in Rajasthan. Durbalnath ji is considered as"kulguru" of Hindu Khatik community. Many temples of Durbalnath ji are situated all across India, but the most famous temple is situated at Bandikui town of dausa district in Rajasthan. Every year "Gyanoprakash mahautsav" is celebrated on Kartik purnima at Bandikui temple.

== Early life ==
idol of Durbalnath ji on the occasion of Gyanoprakash mahotsav at Sant Shri Durbalnath temple, Bandikui

The details of Durbalnath's life are not well known because he was from a backward caste family and at that time members of his caste's birth were not recorded by the Brahmin scholars. His spiritual guru was shri Garibnath Ji.
