= Gandhinagar Jaipur railway station =

Railway station in Rajasthan, India

Coordinates: 26.8734759°N 75.7968188°E

Gandhi Nagar Jaipur
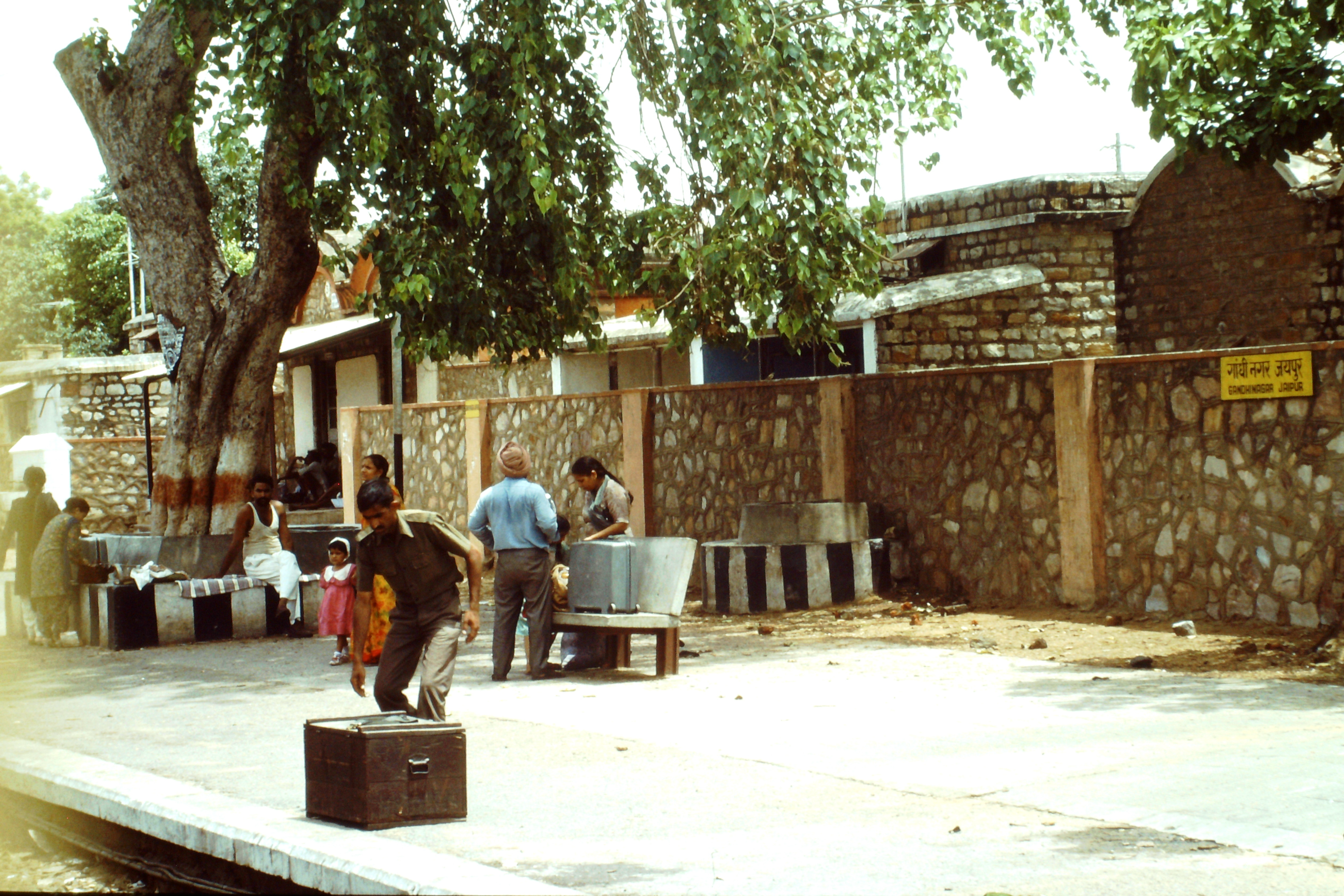

General information
- Location: Tonk Road, Tonk Phatak, Jaipur, Rajasthan; India
- Elevation: 428.63 metres (1,406.3 ft)
- System: Indian Railways station
- Owner: Indian Railways
- Line: Delhi–Jaipur line
- Connections: Orange Line Gandhinagar Station (under-construction)

Construction
- Parking: Available
- Accessible: Available

Other information
- Status: Functional
- Station code: GADJ
- Zone(s): North Western Railway zone
- Division(s): Jaipur

History
- Electrified: 2020
Location
- Location within Jaipur Location within Rajasthan
- Interactive map

Gandhi Nagar Jaipur railway station (station code – GADJ) is a railway station in Jaipur. It is located in Bajaj Nagar area of the city. It is close to Tonk Road and Jawahar Lal Nehru Marg (Jaipur) and mainly caters to the southern areas of the city. Many trains to and from Delhi have a stoppage at this station.

This is the first all-woman operated railway station in India. A leap toward women's empowerment.

== Platform ==
The station has two platforms and entry/exit on either side of the station.

Mostly, trains going to Delhi, Gurgaon, Alwar, Khairthal, Ghaziabad, haridwar etc. stop at platform 1 and trains coming from these places stop at platform 2. Vice versa, trains going to Ajmer stop at platform 2 and trains coming from Ajmer stop at platform 1.

== Facilities ==
The station has current, reservation and tatkal ticket counter. Other amenities available at Gandhi Nagar railway station are one railway over-bridge, two foot over-bridges, semi-covered platforms, waiting seats, toilets, wheel-chair, Digital information screen, parking, etc. However, the station doesn't have any food vending kiosk or cloak room.

Now the station also have facility of escalator on both side so you don't have to climb on stairs.

== Important trains ==
- New Delhi–Ajmer Shatabdi Express
- Marudhar Express
- Ala Hazrat Express
- Ala Hazrat Express (via Bhildi)
- Pooja Superfast Express
- Ajmer–Amritsar Express
- Malani Express
- Agra Fort Ajmer Intercity Express
- Ala Hazrat Express (via Ahmedabad)
- Jaipur Delhi Sarai Rohilla AC Double Decker Express
- Ranikhet Express
- Allahabad Mathura Express
