= Bandikui =

- City
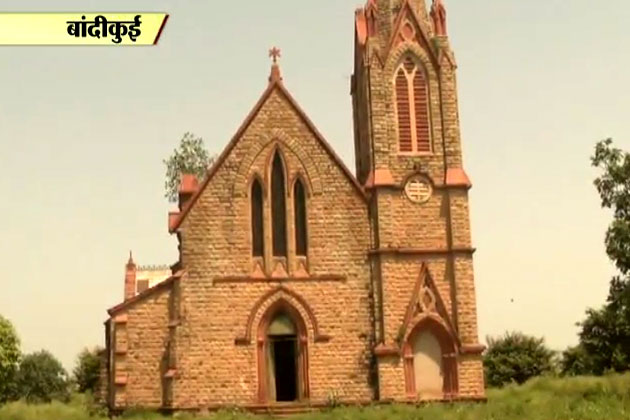
- Nickname: Rail Nagari
- Location in Rajasthan, India Bandikui (India)
- Coordinates: 27.05°N 76.57°E
- Country: India
- State: Rajasthan
- District: Dausa

Government
  - Type: Government Of Rajasthan
  - Body: Municipality

Area
  - Total: 24 km^{2} (9.3 sq mi)
- Elevation: 280 m (920 ft)

Population (2023)
  - Total: 65,000
  - Density: 2,700/km^{2} (7,000/sq mi)

Languages
  - Official: Hindi, Rajasthani
- Time zone: UTC+5:30 (IST)
- PIN: 303313
- Telephone code 01420: 01420
- Vehicle registration: RJ-29

Bandikui is a city and a Municipality, Tehsil, Assembly constituency in Dausa district, Jaipur division the Indian state of Rajasthan. It is 30 km from Dausa and 66 km from Jaipur and located on State Highway 25 (SH-25). and National Expressway 4 (India)

== Geography ==
Bandikui sits at the junction of the Agra-Jaipur and the Delhi-Jaipur railway lines. The city is located 200 km south of Delhi. Rajgarh town (in Alwar district) is about 25 km north of Bandikui. Dausa is about 30 km, Sikandra and Baswa is located about 10 km away, while the state capital Jaipur is 66 km by road and 70 km by rail.

== History ==
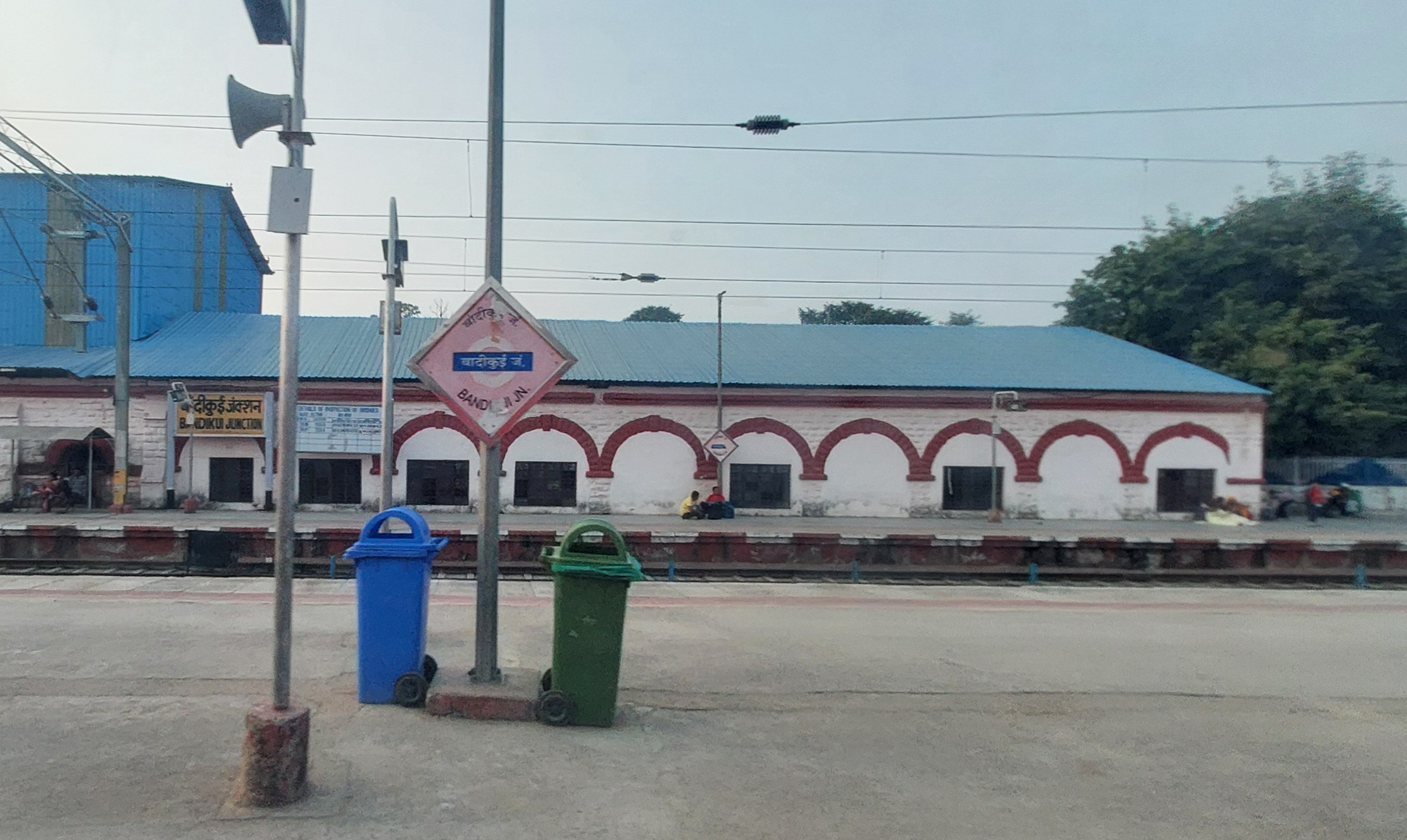
Bandikui Junction Railway Station

Bandikui was preferred for the tri-junction by British Railway surveyors over Rajgarh, Alwar, due to better alignment. The Bandikui railway station was established in 1874. The first train in Rajasthan ran from Bandikui Junction to Agra Fort, started in April 1874 by the colonial government in India. Most trains traveling between Delhi and Jaipur stop at Bandikui. At the time of colonialism, some 1000 British families lived in Bandikui. Some Raj era bungalows can still be found in Bandikui.

The city attracted migration from nearby villages and its population grew to more than 125,000. Many residents work in Delhi and keep their families in Bandikui.

It was in the reign of Lord Northbrook, the Viceroy that the Delhi – Bandikui line was opened in December 1874. Bandikui has had the singular distinction witnessing and passing through its territory the royal saloons of Prince of Wales, later King Edward VII 1874-1875, King George V, in 1911, Prince of Wales, later King Edward VIII 1921-22 and the Queen Elizabeth in 1961 on her way to tiger shoot at Bharatpur.

== Attractions ==
- St Francis Roman Catholic Church, built by King SJ9001, cast in stone, is located near the railway station. The Rajasthan Government gave a grant of Rs 1 Crore for its restoration.
- The Harshad Mata Temple dates to 9th century AD, 7 km from Bandikui.
- Abhaneri Chand Baori is the deepest stepwell in India.
- Saint Durbalnath is a temple in Bandikui. Every year on kartik purnima "Gyanoprakash mahautsav" Is celebrated at saint Durbalnath temple in which Khatik Pilgrims from various part of the country gathers to celebrate the auspicious occasion.

== Economy ==
The city is a major agrarian center.
