= Murhesi Rampur railway station =

Railway station in Uttar Pradesh, India

General information
- Location: SH 33, Mathura, Uttar Pradesh; India
- Coordinates: 27.4123°N 77.6275°E
- Elevation: 182 metres (597 ft)
- System: Indian Railways station
- Owner: Omveer Singh kuntal
- Operator: West Central Railway
- Platforms: 2
- Tracks: 4 (Double Electrified BG)
- Connections: Auto stand

Construction
- Structure type: Standard (on ground station)
- Parking: No
- Cycle facilities: No

Other information
- Status: Functioning
- Station code: MSRP
- Zone(s): West Central Railway
- Division(s): Kota
Location
- Location within India Location within Uttar Pradesh

Murhesi Rampur railway station is a small railway station in Mathura district, Uttar Pradesh. Its code is AME. It serves Mathura city. The station consists of two platforms. The platforms are not well sheltered. It lacks many facilities including water and sanitation.

== Trains ==
Some of the trains that runs from Murhesi Rampur are:

- Mathura–Ratlam Passenger (unreserved)
- Mathura–Bayana Passenger (unreserved)
- Sawai–Madhopur–Mathura Passenger (unreserved)
