= Sanganer railway station =

Railway station in Jaipur district, Rajasthan

Sanganer

General information
- Location: Sanganer, Jaipur district, Rajasthan; India
- Coordinates: 26.814266°N 75.772957°E
- Elevation: 383 metres (1,257 ft)
- System: Indian Railways station
- Owner: Indian Railways
- Operator: North Western Railway
- Line: Jaipur–Sawai Madhopur line
- Platforms: 3
- Tracks: 3

Construction
- Structure type: Standard (on ground station)
- Parking: Yes

Other information
- Status: Functioning
- Station code: SNGN
- Zone(s): North Western Railway
- Division(s): Jaipur
Location
- Location within Greater Jaipur Location within Rajasthan Location within India

Sanganer railway station is a railway station in Jaipur district, Rajasthan. Its code is SNGN. It serves Sanganer town. The station consists of 3 platforms. Passenger, Express trains halt here.

== Trains ==
The following trains halt at Sanganer railway station in both directions:

- Kota–Jaipur Express
- Bhopal–Jaipur Express
