= Phulera Junction railway station =

Railway station in Rajasthan, India

Phulera Junction

General information
- Location: Phulera, Rajasthan; India
- Coordinates: 26.8731°N 75.2454°E
- Elevation: 388 metres (1,273 ft)
- System: Indian Railways station
- Owner: Indian Railways
- Operator: North Western Railway
- Lines: Merta Road–Rewari line Jaipur–Ahmedabad line
- Platforms: 5
- Tracks: 10 (Construction – Electrification of single BG)
- Connections: Auto stand

Construction
- Structure type: Standard (on ground station)
- Parking: Yes
- Cycle facilities: No

Other information
- Status: Functioning
- Station code: FL
- Zone(s): North Western Railway
- Division(s): Jaipur
Location
- Location within Rajasthan Location within India

Phulera Junction railway station is a main railway station in Jaipur district, Rajasthan. Its code is FL. It serves Phulera town. The station consists of 5 platforms. The station lies on Jaipur–Ahmedabad main line which connects Jaipur to Ajmer and Ahmedabad as well as Merta Road–Rewari line which connects Jodhpur to Jaipur and Delhi. 111 trains pass through the station and 5 of the originates form the station. It also houses the YDM-4 Locomotives that serve the Mavli-Marwar Metre Gauge Line

== Major trains ==
Some of the important trains that runs from Phulera Junction are:

- Ala Hazrat Express (via Bhildi)
- Anuvrat AC Superfast Express
- Ala Hazrat Express (via Ahmedabad)
- Bandra Terminus–Delhi Sarai Rohilla Express (via Reengus)
- Bandra Terminus–Chandigarh Bi-weekly Superfast Express (via Reengus)
- Ajmer–Chandigarh Garib Rath Express
- Shri Mata Vaishno Devi Katra–Ahmedabad Express (via Jaipur)
- Bhopal–Jaipur Express
- Indore–Jaipur Superfast Express
- Ajmer–Delhi Sarai Rohilla Jan Shatabdi Express
- Jodhpur–Jaipur Intercity Express (via Merta Road)
- Chetak Express
- Pooja Superfast Express (via Jaipur)
- Udaipur–Jaipur Special Superfast Express (via Ajamer)
- Phulera–Rewari Passenger (via Reengus)
- Phulera-Jaipur Passenger
- Jaipur–Ahmedabad Fast Passenger (via Ajmer)
- Jaipur–Bikaner Fast Passenger (via Merta Road)
- Phulera–Kota Passenger (via Jaipur, Swaimadopur)
- Leelan Superfast Bikaner Express (via Merta Road)
- Ajmer–Agra Fort Superfast Express (via Jaipur Road)
