= Bhachau railway station =

Railway station in Gujarat, India

General information
- Location: Bhachau, Gujarat; India
- Coordinates: 23°18′15″N 70°21′00″E
- Elevation: 44 metres (144 ft)
- System: Indian Railways station
- Owner: Indian Railways
- Operator: Western Railway
- Line: Gandhidham–Ahmedabad main line
- Platforms: 3
- Tracks: 4
- Connections: Auto stand

Construction
- Structure type: Standard (on-ground station)
- Parking: Yes
- Cycle facilities: Yes

Other information
- Status: Functioning
- Station code: BCOB
- Zone(s): Western Railway
- Division(s): Ahmedabad
Location
- Location within India Location within Gujarat

Bhachau railway station is a railway station serving Bhachau town, in Kutch district of Gujarat State of India. It is under Ahmedabad railway division of Western Railway zone of Indian Railways. It is located on Gandhidham–Ahmedabad main line.

It is located at 44 m above sea level and has three platforms. In 2016, electrified double broad-gauge railway lines exist and 30 trains stopped. Kandla Airport is 35 kilometres away.
