= Bhildi =

- town
- Location in Gujarat, India Bhildi (India)
- Coordinates: 24°11′0″N 72°2′0″E
- Country: India
- State: Gujarat
- District: Banaskantha
- Elevation: 100 m (330 ft)

Population
  - Total: 7,000

Languages
  - Official: Gujarati, Hindi
- Time zone: UTC+5:30 (IST)
- PIN: 385530
- Telephone code: 02744
- Vehicle registration: GJ-08
- Coastline: 0 kilometres (0 mi)
- Nearest city: Deesa
- Website: gujaratindia.com

Bhildi is a town in Deesa, Banaskantha district, Gujarat, India.

== Geography ==
It is located at 24°11′0″N 72°2′0″E at an elevation of 100 m above MSL. Bhiladiyaji

== Jain Tirth ==
Bhiladiyaji Śvetāmbara Jain Temple located here is very ancient which was much renovated in last decade. The temple of Bhiladiyaji Tirth is dedicated to Lord Parshvanatha. Here the lord is known as Shri Bhiladia Parshvanath Bhagavan. The temple is two storied and is adorned with three peaks. The idol of the Lord is of black in colour and is 53 cm in height. It is seated in a padmasana posture.

== Transport ==
Bhildi is an important railway junction on the Western Railway network and connected to Kandla port and Mundra port via Gandhidham. It provides direct connectivity to Jodhpur, Palanpur WDFC and Ahemdabad from these Arabian sea ports. Many long distance trains pass through Bhildi now as a new direct link to Ahemdabad via Patan has been commissioned in 2019, which also connects to existing western Rajasthan rail-line.

== See also ==
- Railway stations in India
