= Agra Fort–Ajmer Intercity Express =

Train in India

Agra Fort-Ajmer Intercity Superfast Express

Overview
- Service type: Intercity Superfast
- First service: 20 January 2010; 16 years ago
- Current operator: North Western Railway

Route
- Termini: Agra Fort (AF); Ajmer Junction (AII)
- Stops: 13
- Distance travelled: 375 km (233 mi)
- Average journey time: 6 hours 45 mins
- Service frequency: Daily
- Train number: 12195 / 12196

On-board services
- Classes: AC Chair Car, Chair Car, General Unreserved
- Seating arrangements: Yes
- Sleeping arrangements: Yes
- Auto-rack arrangements: Overhead racks
- Catering facilities: On-board catering, E-catering
- Observation facilities: Large windows
- Baggage facilities: No
- Other facilities: Below the seats

Technical
- Rolling stock: LHB coach
- Track gauge: 1,676 mm (5 ft 6 in)
- Operating speed: 56 km/h (35 mph) average including halts.

The 12195 / 12196 Agra Fort-Ajmer Intercity Superfast Express is an intercity superfast express train belonging to Indian Railways North Central Railway zone that runs between Agra Fort and Ajmer Junction in India.

It operates as train number 12195 from Agra Fort to Ajmer Junction and as train number 12196 in the reverse direction serving the states of Uttar Pradesh & Rajasthan.

== Coaches ==
The 12195 / 96 Agra Fort Junction - Ajmer Junction Intercity Express has one AC Chair Car, eight Chair Car, eight general unreserved & two SLR (seating with luggage rake) coaches . It does not carry a pantry car coach.

As is customary with most train services in India, coach composition may be amended at the discretion of Indian Railways depending on demand.

== Service ==
The 12195 Agra Fort - Ajmer Junction Intercity Express covers the distance of 375 km (233 mi) in 6 hours 45 mins (56 km/h) and in 6 hours 40 mins as the 12196 Ajmer Junction - Agra Fort Intercity Express (56 km/h).

As the average speed of the train is slightly more than 55 km/h (34 mph), as per railway rules, its fare should includes a Superfast surcharge but the given train number isn't come under the superfast category.

== Route & halts ==
Station code	Station name
AII	Ajmer Junction
JP	Jaipur Junction
GADJ	Gandhi Nagar Jaipur
DQ	Dausa
BKI	Bandikui Junction
KL	Kherli
BTE	Bharatpur Junction
AF	Agra Fort

== Traction ==
As the route is now fully electrified, a Kanpur Loco Shed based WAP-7 electric locomotive pulls the train to its destination.
