= Jaipur Junction railway station =

Indian railway station

JAIPUR JUNCTION

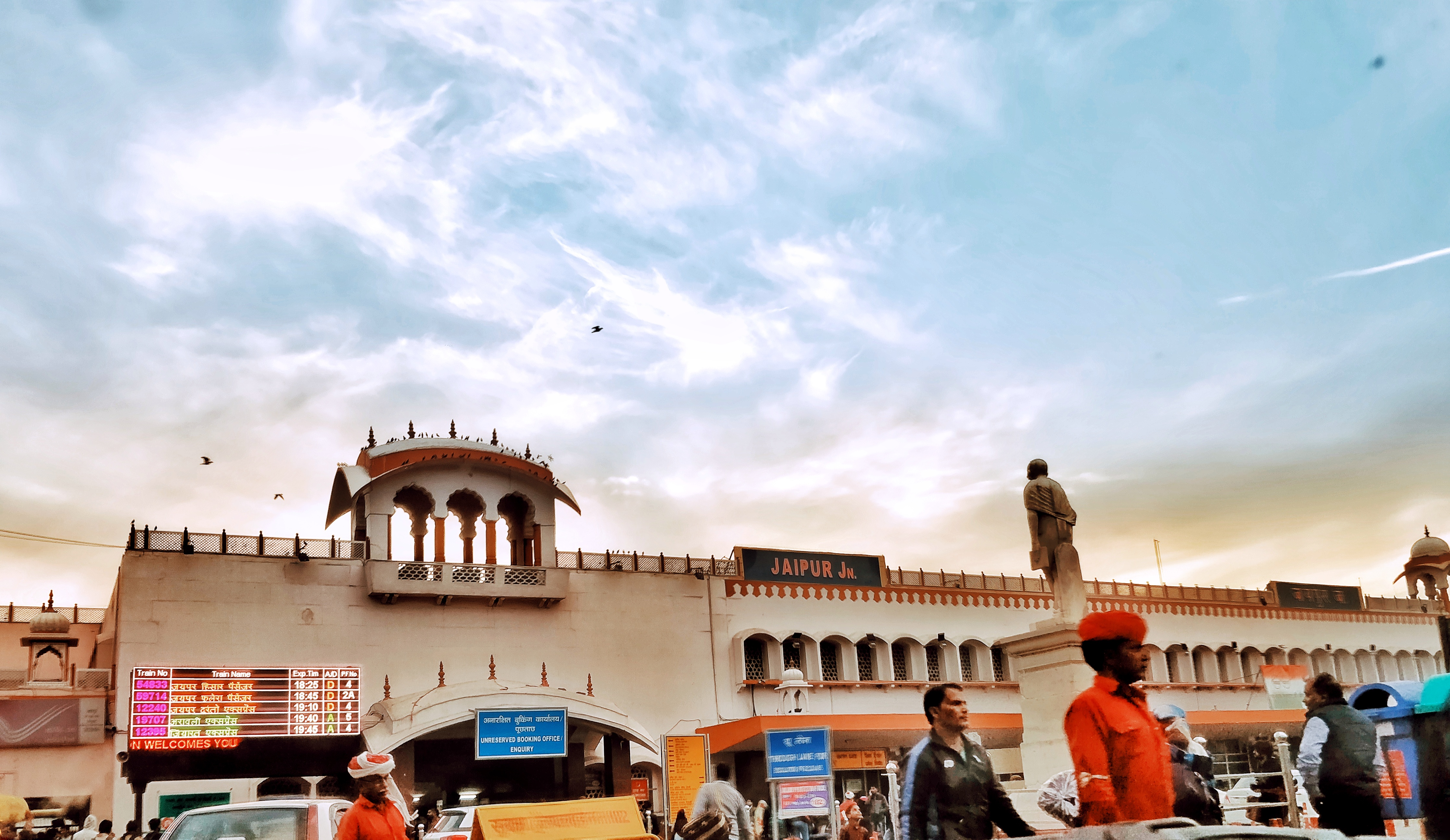
- Jaipur Junction railway station

General information
- Location: Hasanpura, Jaipur, Rajasthan; India
- Coordinates: 26°55′15″N 75°47′12″E
- Elevation: 428 metres (1,404 ft)
- System: Express train and Passenger train station
- Owner: Indian Railways
- Operator: North Western Railways
- Lines: New Delhi–Ahmedabad main line, Jaipur–Rewari new railway line, Jaipur–Ahmedabad main line, Delhi–Jodhpur, Kota–Jaipur main line, Jaipur–Sawai Madhopur railway line, Jaipur–Gangapur City railway line, Jaipur–Ringas–Sikar–Churu
- Platforms: 8 (1, 2, 2A, 3, 4, 5, 1A, 1B)
- Tracks: 16 broad gauge
- Connections: Pink Line Railway Station

Construction
- Parking: Available
- Accessible: Available

Other information
- Status: Functioning
- Station code: JP
- Zone(s): North Western Railway
- Division(s): Jaipur

History
- Opened: 1895; 131 years ago
- Electrified: 2020; 6 years ago
Location
- Location within Jaipur Location within Rajasthan Location within India
- Interactive map

Jaipur Junction (Code: JP) is a railway station in Jaipur, the capital and largest city of the Indian state of Rajasthan. It serves as the headquarters of Jaipur railway division and North Western Railway zone of the Indian Railways.

== Overview ==
Jaipur station was built in 1875 and is situated at the centre of Rajasthan. Serving almost 35,000 passengers daily, Jaipur Junction is the busiest station in Rajasthan. The cornerstone of the existing Jaipur railway station building was laid on 4 May 1956 by Maharaja Sawai Man Singh II of Jaipur and construction took three years to complete. The station harnesses solar energy technology to power its operations.

Being centrally located, Jaipur Junction hosts or is close to other transportation facilities such as the inter-state bus terminal Sindhi Camp, and the newly constructed Jaipur Metro at its Railway Station metro station. One of India's luxury trains, the Palace on Wheels, also makes a scheduled stop in Jaipur.

== Infrastructure and amenities ==
The Jaipur railway station has provided free Wi-Fi for the convenience of passengers since 2015. A water recycling plant with a 500 kl/day capacity and waste-to-energy plant that converts plastic waste to diesel has also been set up. In 2019, the northwestern zone of Indian Railways upgraded the Jaipur Junction railway station by installing LED lights to improve the brightness inside the station. The station has been brought up to "airport standard" by Indian Railways through modernization and new facilities. A plan has been created by the Railways Board to further improve lighting in concourse halls, station platforms, circulating areas, waiting rooms, reservation counters, inquiry counters, foot bridges (FOB), stairs, parking areas, escalators and lifts, among other places. Recently, the Indian Government also introduced retiring rooms and can be booked from Jaipur Junction Railway station.

== Lines ==
The main lines passing through Jaipur are:

- Delhi–Jodhpur line via Makrana, Degana, Merta road (double broad-gauge electrified line)
- Delhi–Ahmedabad line via Bandikui, Jaipur, Ajmer (double broad-gauge electrified line)
- Sawai Madhopur–Jaipur line terminates at Jaipur (single broad-gauge electrified line)
- Jaipur–Sikar (single broad-gauge electrified line)

== Nearby railway stations ==
- Gandhinagar Jaipur railway station
- Getor Jagatpura railway station
- Durgapura railway station
- Dahar Ka Balaji railway station
- Bais Godam railway station (Decommissioned and used for unscheduled halts only)
- Kanakpura railway station
- Sanganer railway station

== Gallery ==
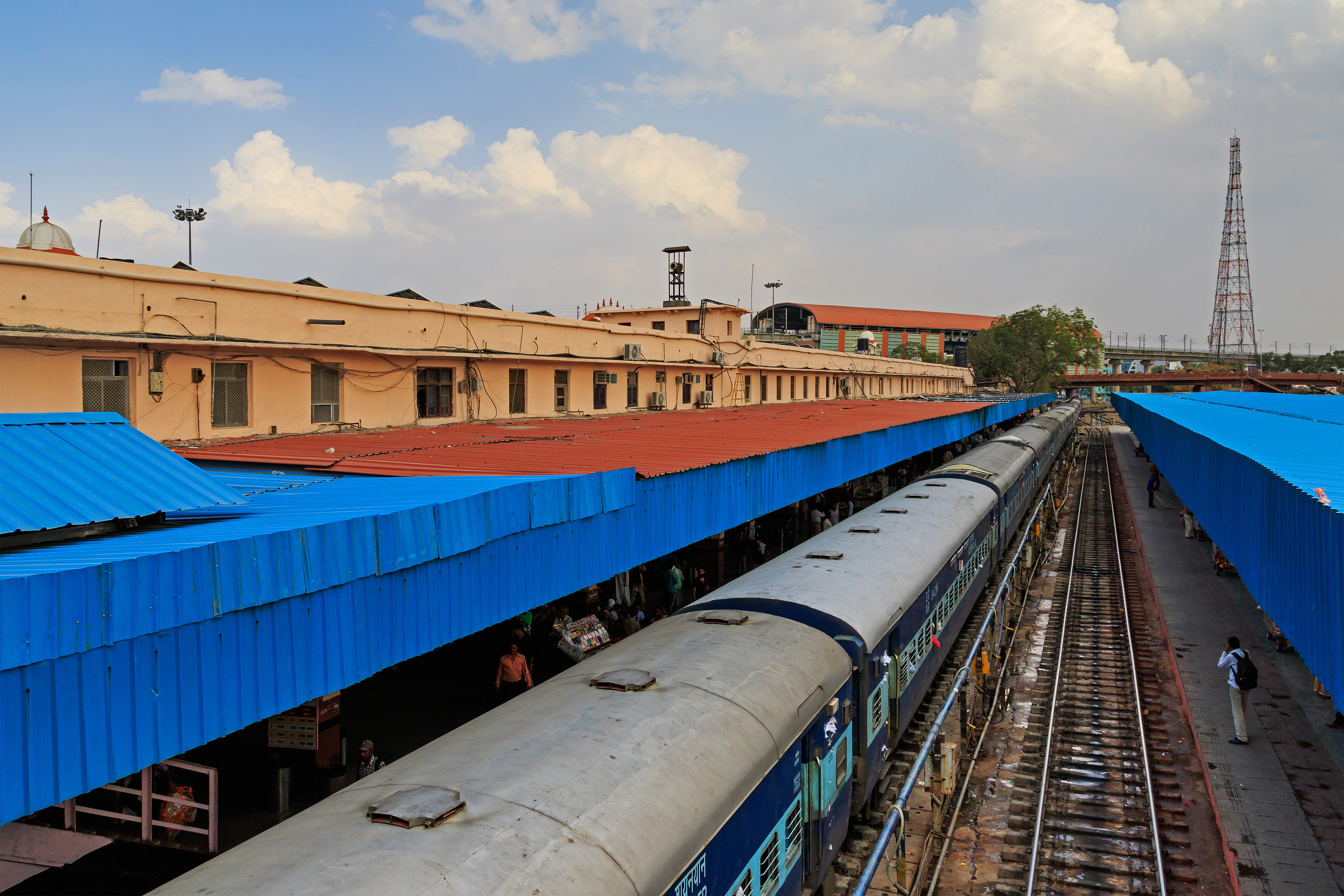
Train at platform

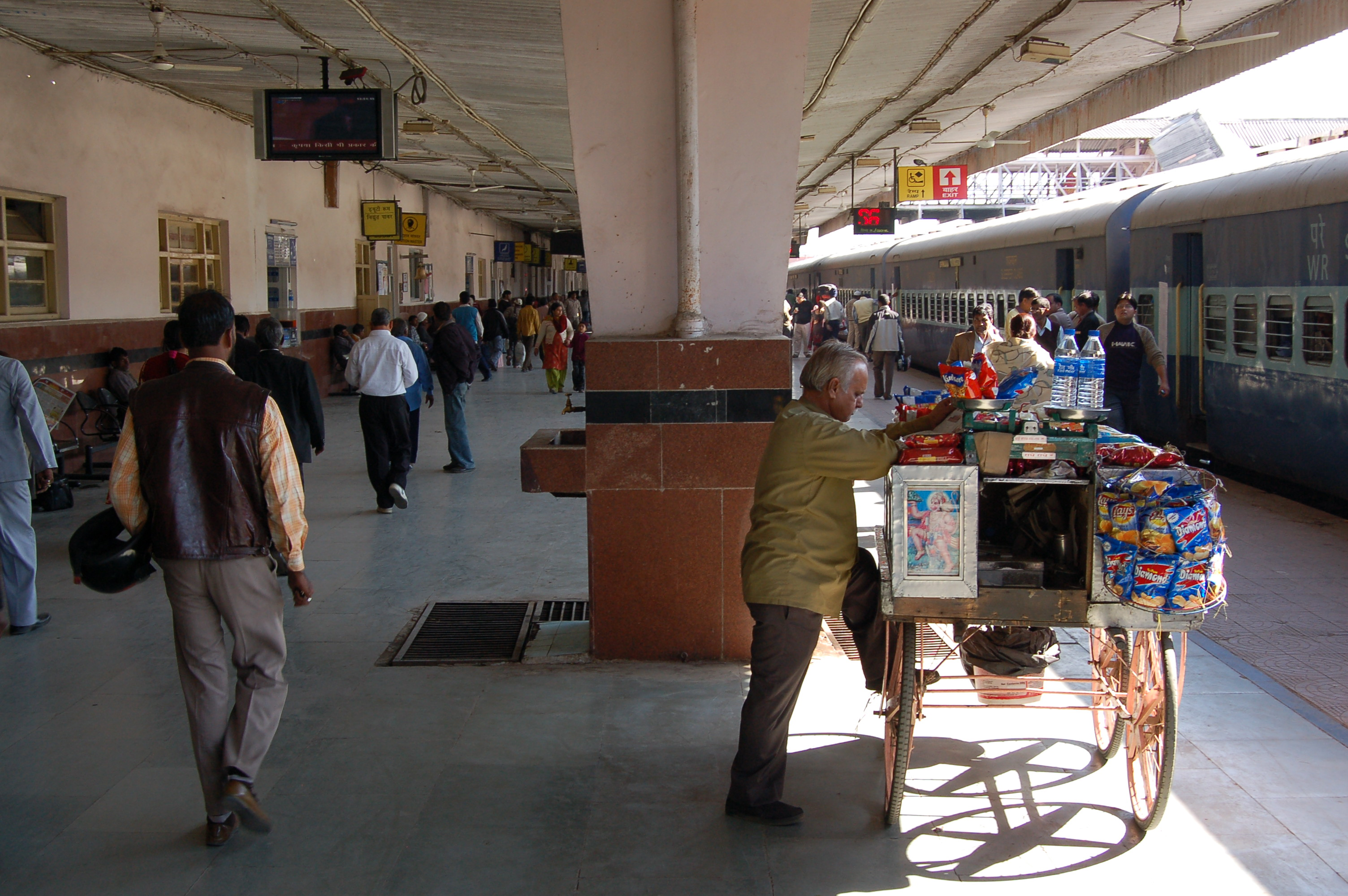
Platform

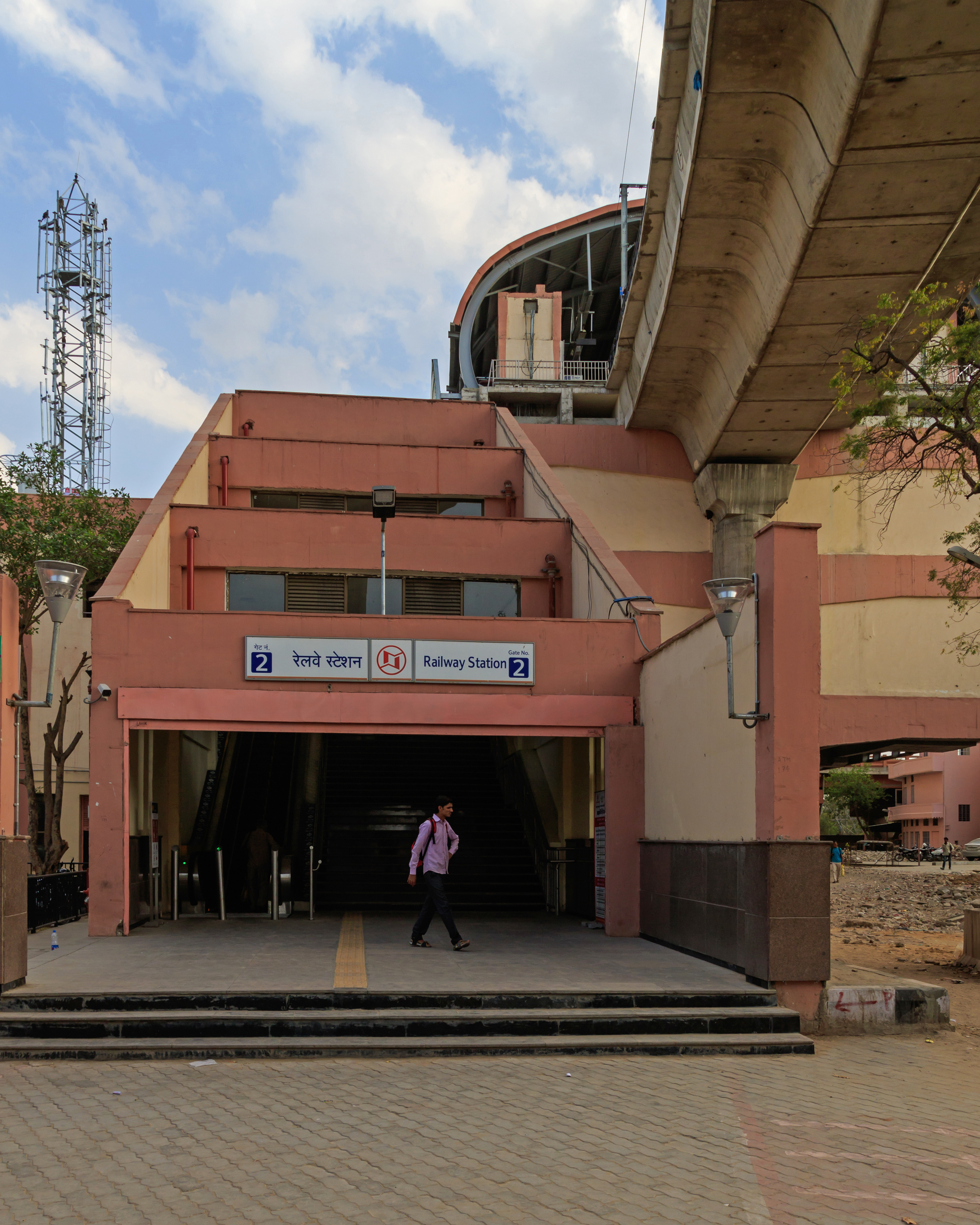
Railway station on the Jaipur Metro Pink Line
