= Khairthal railway station =

Railway station in Rajasthan, India

Khairthal

General information
- Location: Khairthal, Khairthal-Tijara district, Rajasthan; India
- Coordinates: 27.797833°N 76.641792°E
- Elevation: 308 metres (1,010 ft)
- System: Indian Railways station
- Owner: Indian Railways
- Operator: North Western Railway
- Line: Delhi–Jaipur line
- Platforms: 2
- Tracks: 2

Construction
- Structure type: Standard (on ground station)
- Parking: Yes

Other information
- Status: Functioning
- Station code: KRH
- Zone(s): North Western Railway
- Division(s): Jaipur
Location
- Location within India Location within Rajasthan

Khairthal railway station is a railway station in Khairthal in Khairthal-Tijara district of Rajasthan, India. Its code is KRH. It serves Khairthal. The station consists of 2 platforms. Passenger, Express trains halt here.
