= Bandikui Junction =

Railway Station in Rajasthan, India

Bandikui Junction railway station
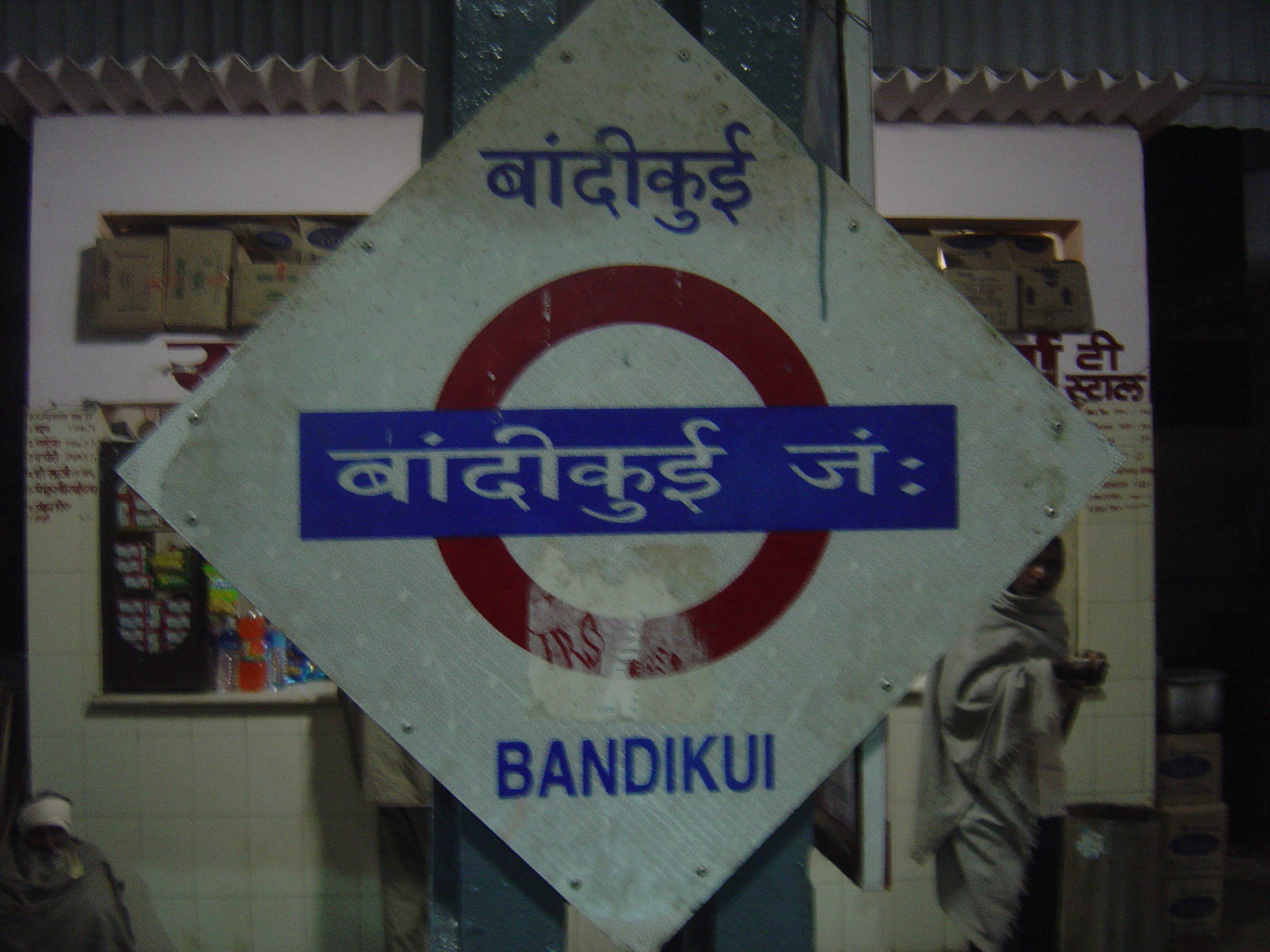

General information
- Location: Railway Station Rd, Bandikui Marg, SH 25, Bandikui, Rajasthan; India
- Coordinates: 27.0394°N 76.5664°E
- Elevation: 222.000 metres (728.346 ft)
- System: Indian Railways station
- Owner: Indian Railways
- Operator: North Western Railway
- Lines: New Delhi–Jaipur–Ahmedabad main line, Bandikui–Agra railway line, Kota–Rewari railway line
- Platforms: 6
- Tracks: 9 broad gauge
- Connections: Auto stand, Bike and Car Parking

Construction
- Structure type: Standard (on-ground station)
- Parking: Available
- Accessible: Available

Other information
- Status: Functioning
- Station code: BKI
- Zone(s): North Western Railway
- Division(s): Jaipur
Location
- Location within Rajasthan
- Interactive map

Bandikui Junction is a major railway station in Dausa district, Jaipur division, Rajasthan. Its code is BKI. It serves Bandikui city and Mehandipur Balaji Temple and Sikandra, Baswa, Tehla, Reni Area. The station consists of six platforms. The platforms are well sheltered. It has full facilities including water and sanitation.

Station is a major railway station at the junction of Agra–Jaipur and Delhi–Jaipur railway lines in Dausa district of Rajasthan. It is one of the earliest railway stations in northern India and also was the destination of steam locomotives. The first train in Rajasthan ran from Bandikui Junction to Agra Fort, started in April 1874 by the colonial government in India.
