= Daurai–Tanakpur Express =

Train in India

Daurai - Tanakpur Express
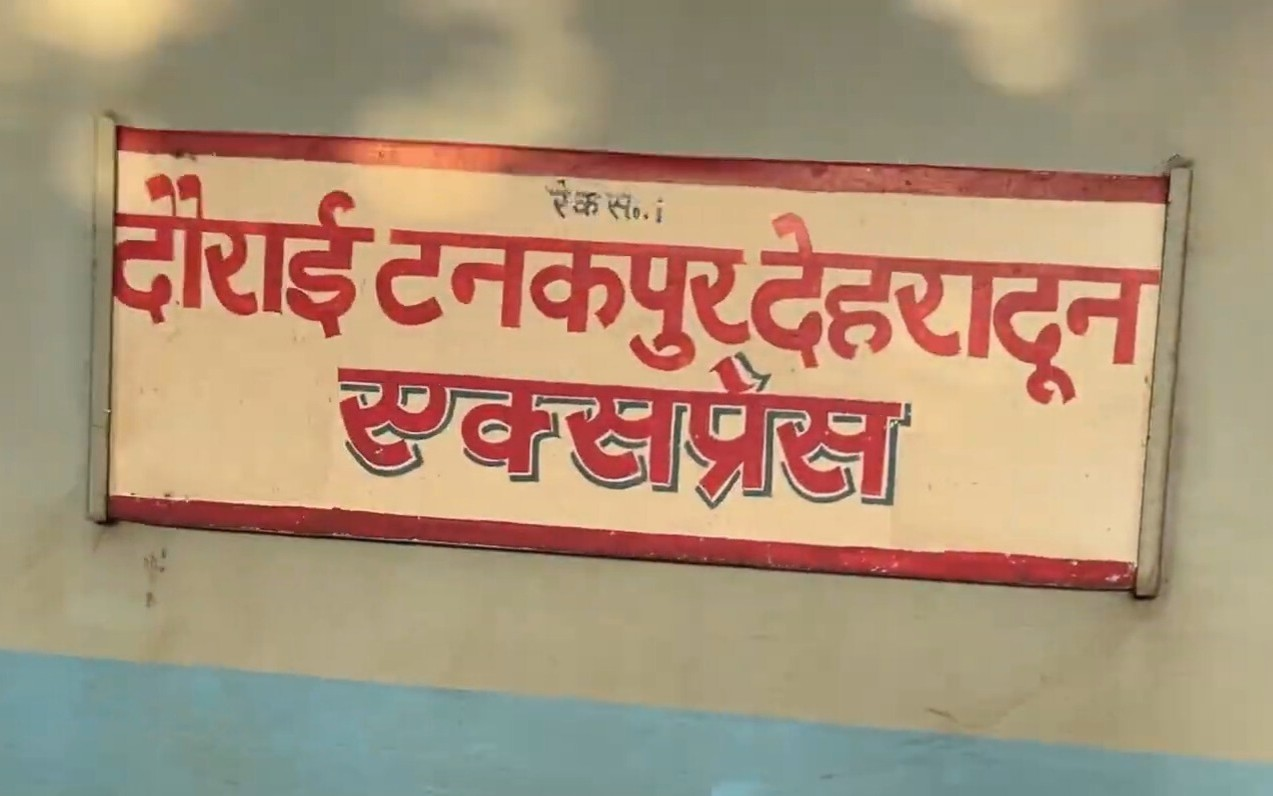

Overview
- Service type: Express
- Status: Active
- Locale: Rajasthan, Haryana, New Delhi and Uttar Pradesh
- First service: 31 March 2025; 12 months ago
- Current operator: North Eastern (NER)

Route
- Termini: Daurai (DOZ); Tanakpur (TPU)
- Stops: 22
- Distance travelled: 779 km (484 mi)
- Average journey time: 17h 30m
- Service frequency: Weekly
- Train number: 15091 / 15092

On-board services
- Classes: General Unreserved, Sleeper Class, AC 1st Class, AC 2nd Class, AC 3rd Class Economy
- Seating arrangements: Yes
- Sleeping arrangements: Yes
- Catering facilities: E Catering
- Observation facilities: Large windows
- Baggage facilities: No
- Other facilities: Below the seats

Technical
- Rolling stock: LHB coach
- Track gauge: 1,676 mm (5 ft 6 in)
- Electrification: 25 kV 50 Hz AC Overhead line
- Operating speed: 130 km/h (81 mph) maximum, 45 km/h (28 mph) average including halts.
- Track owner: Indian Railways

The 15091 / 15092 Daurai–Tanakpur Express is an express train belonging to North Eastern Railway zone that runs between the city Daurai of Rajasthan and Tanakpur of Uttar Pradesh in India.

It operates as train number 15091 from Daurai to Tanakpur and as train number 15092 in the reverse direction, serving the states of Uttar Pradesh, New Delhi, Haryana and Rajasthan.

== Services ==
• 15091/ Daurai–Tanakpur Express has an average speed of 45 km/h and covers 779 km in 17h 30m.

• 15092/ Tanakpur–Daurai Express has an average speed of 40 km/h and covers 779 km in 19h 35m.

== Routes and halts ==
The Important Halts of the train are :

● Daurai

● Ajmer Junction

● Kishangarh

● Phulera Junction

● Ringas Junction

● Shri Madhopur

● Nim Ka Thana

● Narnaul

● Rewari Junction

● Gurgaon

● Delhi Cantt

● Delhi Junction

● Ghaziabad Junction

● Moradabad Junction

● Chandausi Junction

● Bareilly Junction

● Bareilly City

● Izzatnagar

● Bhojipur Junction

● Pilibhit Junction

● Khatima

● Tanakpur

== Schedule ==
• 15091 - 4:05 PM (Monday, Tuesday, Thursday & Saturday) [Daurai]

• 15092 - 6:20 PM (Sunday, Monday, Wednesday & Friday) [Tanakpur]

== Coach composition ==
1. General Unreserved - 4
2. Sleeper Class - 5
3. AC 1st Class - 1
4. AC 2nd Class - 1
5. AC 3rd Class Economy - 3

== Traction ==
As the entire route is fully electrified it is hauled by a Izzatnagar Shed-based WAP-4 or WAP-7 electric locomotive from Daurai to Tanakpur and vice versa.

== Rake share ==
The train Rake sharing with Dehradun–Tanakpur Express (15019/15020).

== See also ==
Trains from Daurai :

No trains.

Trains from Tanakpur :

1. Shaktinagar Terminal–Tanakpur Express

== Notes ==
a. Runs 4 days in a week with both directions.
