= Neem Ka Thana railway station =

Railway station in Rajasthan, India

Nim Ka Thana
- Indian Railways logo

General information
- Location: SH-37B, Nim Ka Thana, Sikar district, Rajasthan; India
- Coordinates: 27.741981°N 75.779401°E
- Elevation: 449 metres (1,473 ft)
- System: Indian Railways station
- Owner: Indian Railways
- Operator: North Western Railways
- Line: Ajmer–Rewari line
- Platforms: 2
- Tracks: 2

Construction
- Structure type: Standard (on-ground station)
- Parking: Yes
- Cycle facilities: No

Other information
- Status: Functional
- Station code: NMK
- Zone(s): North Western Railway zone
- Division(s): Jaipur
Location
- Location within Rajasthan Location within India

Nim Ka Thana railway station is a railway station in Sikar district, Rajasthan. Its code is NMK. It serves Nim Ka Thana town. The station consists of two platforms. Passenger, Express, and Superfast trains halt here.

== Trains ==
The following trains halt at Nim Ka Thana railway station in both directions:

- Chetak Express
- Chandigarh–Bandra Terminus Superfast Express
- Ajmer–Delhi Sarai Rohilla Jan Shatabdi Express
