= NNL =

NNL may refer to:

- Narnaul railway station — a railway station in Haryana, India
- National Natural Landmark — a natural history conservation program of the U.S. Secretary of the Interior
- National Nuclear Laboratory — the UK's government-owned commercially operated fully customer-funded nuclear technology service provider
- Nigeria National League, football league
- Negro National League (1920–1931) — one of the several Negro leagues which were established during the period in the United States in which organized baseball was segregated
- Negro National League (1933–1948) — established two years after the first Negro National League had disbanded
- Noether normalization lemma — a theorem in commutative algebra
- No net loss – an environmental policy approach
