= New Delhi–Daurai (Ajmer) Shatabdi Express =

Superfast express train in India

New Delhi – Daurai (Ajmer) Shatabdi Express
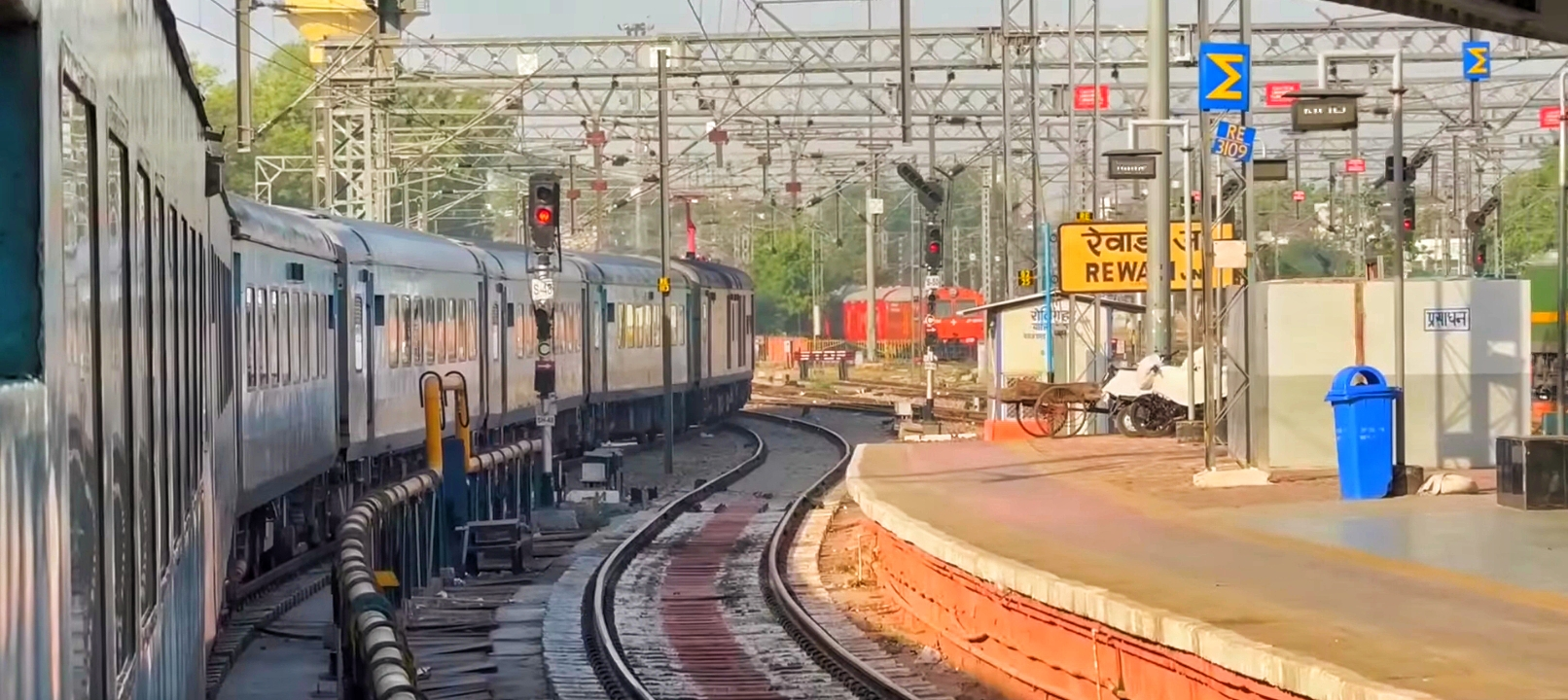
- New Delhi – Daurai (Ajmer) Shatabdi Express At Rewari Junction

Overview
- Service type: Shatabdi Express
- First service: 24 December 1994; 31 years ago
- Current operator: Northern Railways

Route
- Termini: New Delhi (NDLS); Daurai (DOZ)
- Stops: 10
- Distance travelled: 451 km (280 mi)
- Average journey time: 7 hours 25 minutes
- Service frequency: Daily
- Train number: 12015 / 12016
- Lines used: New Delhi–Jaipur; Jaipur–Ahmedabad line (till Daurai)

On-board services
- Classes: AC 1st Class, AC Chair Car
- Seating arrangements: Yes
- Sleeping arrangements: No
- Catering facilities: On-board catering, E-catering
- Observation facilities: Large windows
- Baggage facilities: Overhead racks

Technical
- Rolling stock: LHB coach
- Track gauge: 1,676 mm (5 ft 6 in)
- Electrification: Yes
- Operating speed: 67 km/h (42 mph) average including halts 130 km/h (81 mph) Top operating speed

The 12015 / 12016 New Delhi–Daurai (Ajmer) Shatabdi Express is a Superfast Express train of the Shatabdi Express category belonging to Indian Railways – Northern Railway zone that runs between New Delhi and Daurai (Ajmer) in India.

It operates as train number 12015 from New Delhi to Daurai and as train number 12016 in the reverse direction, serving the states of Delhi, Haryana, and Rajasthan, and have priority above all other trains.

== Service ==
12015 New Delhi–Daurai (Ajmer) Shatabdi Express covers the distance of 444 kilometres in 06 hours 45 mins (66 km/h) and in 06 hours 35 mins as 12016 Daurai (Ajmer)–New Delhi Shatabdi Express (67 km/h).

As the average speed of the train is 67 km/h (42 mph), as per Indian Railway rules, its fare includes a Superfast surcharge.

== Route and halts ==
The stations at which the 12015 – Daurai (Ajmer) Shatabdi Express halts are as follows:

- New Delhi
- Delhi Cantonment
- Gurgaon
- Rewari Junction
- Alwar Junction
- Bandikui Junction
- Gandhi Nagar Jaipur
- Jaipur Junction
- Kishangarh
- Ajmer Junction
- Daurai

== Traction ==
As the route is now fully electrified, a Ghaziabad-based WAP-5 / WAP-7 locomotive powers the train for its entire journey.

== Coach composition ==
The coach composition of 12015 Daurai (Ajmer) Shatabdi is as follows:

- 2 EOG Brake and Luggage van coach
- 14 AC Chair car
- 2 AC Executive Chair Car

== Coach positioning ==
Coach Positioning of 12015 Daurai (Ajmer) Shatabdi at

New Delhi Station is:

LOCO-EOG-C1-C2-C3-C4-C5-C6-C7-C8-C9-C10-C11-C12-C13-C14-E1-E2-EOG

Vice Versa Coach positioning at Daurai.
