= Ajmer–Delhi Sarai Rohilla Jan Shatabdi Express =

Jan Shatabdi Express train in India

Ajmer Junction – Delhi Sarai Rohilla Jan Shatabdi Express
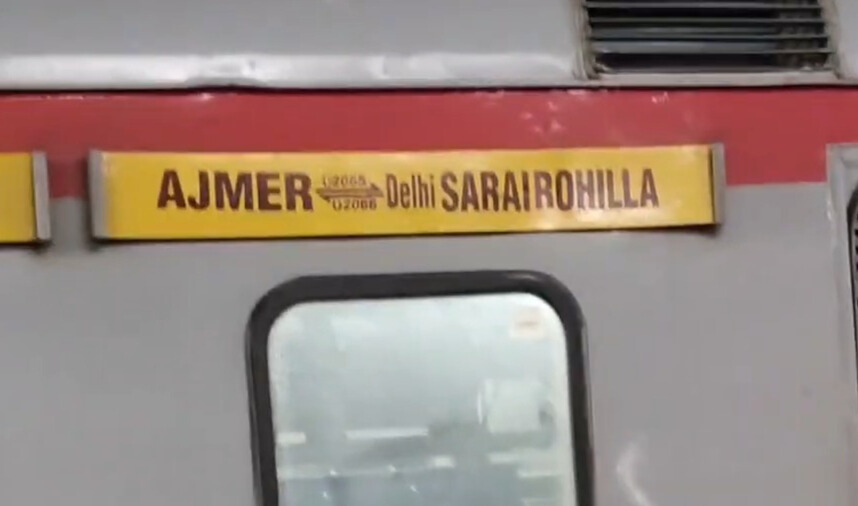

Overview
- Service type: Jan Shatabdi Express
- First service: 22 December 2013; 12 years ago
- Current operator: North Western Railways (NWR)

Route
- Termini: Ajmer Junction (AII); Delhi Sarai Rohilla (DEE)
- Stops: 8
- Distance travelled: 386 km (240 mi)
- Average journey time: 5 hours 55 minutes as 12065, 6 hours 10 minutes as 12066
- Service frequency: Five days a week (Note: Except Sundays and Thursdays)
- Train number: 12065 / 12066

On-board services
- Classes: AC Chair Car, Second Class seating
- Seating arrangements: Yes
- Sleeping arrangements: No
- Catering facilities: On-board catering E-catering
- Observation facilities: Previously ran as Ajmer–Hazrat Nizamuddin Duronto Express
- Baggage facilities: Overhead racks

Technical
- Rolling stock: LHB coach
- Track gauge: 1,676 mm (5 ft 6 in)
- Operating speed: 110 km/h (68 mph) maximum, 63 km/h (39 mph) average including halts

The 12065 / 12066 Ajmer–Delhi Sarai Rohilla Jan Shatabdi Express is a Superfast Express train of the Jan Shatabdi category belonging to Indian Railways - North Western Railway zone that runs between Ajmer Junction and Delhi Sarai Rohilla in India.

It operates as train number 12065 from Ajmer Junction to Delhi Sarai Rohilla and as train number 12066 in the reverse direction, serving the states of Delhi, Haryana & Rajasthan.

This train formerly ran as a Ajmer–Hazrat Nizamuddin Duronto Express but due to poor demand was converted to a Jan Shatabdi Express.

== Coaches ==
The 12065 / 12066 Ajmer–Delhi Sarai Rohilla Jan Shatabdi Express has 1 AC car, 12 Second Class seating and 2 power cars. It does not carry a pantry car.

As is customary with most train services in India, coach composition may be amended at the discretion of Indian Railways depending on demand.

== Service ==
The 12065 Ajmer–Delhi Sarai Rohilla Jan Shatabdi Express covers the distance of 386 km (240 mi) in 5 hours 55 mins (55.14 km/h) and in 6 hours 5 mins as 12066 Delhi Sarai Rohilla–Ajmer Jan Shatabdi Express (56.49 km/h).

As the average speed of the train is above 55 km/h (34 mph), as per Indian Railways rules, its fare includes a Superfast surcharge.

== Routeing ==
The 12065 / 12066 Ajmer–Delhi Sarai Rohilla Jan Shatabdi Express runs from Ajmer Junction via Kishangarh, Phulera Junction, Ringas Junction, Nim Ka Thana, Narnaul, Rewari, Gurgaon, Delhi Cantonment to Delhi Sarai Rohilla.

== Traction ==
As the entire route is now fully electrified, a Ghaziabad-based WAP-5 / WAP-7 electric locomotive powers the train for its entire journey.

== Timings ==
- 12065 Ajmer–Delhi Sarai Rohilla Jan Shatabdi Express leaves Ajmer Junction every Monday, Tuesday, Wednesday, Friday and Saturday at 05:40 hrs IST and reaches Delhi Sarai Rohilla at 11:35 hrs IST the same day.
- 12066 Delhi Sarai Rohilla–Ajmer Jan Shatabdi Express leaves Delhi Sarai Rohilla every Monday, Tuesday, Wednesday, Friday and Saturday at 16:20 hrs IST and reaches Ajmer Junction at 22:25 hrs IST the same day.
