= Ajmer–Hazrat Nizamuddin Duronto Express =

Overview
- Service type: Duronto
- First service: 1 July 2012; 14 years ago
- Last service: 12 November 2013; 12 years ago
- Current operator: North Western Railway zone

Route
- Termini: Ajmer Junction (AII); Hazrat Nizamuddin (NZM)
- Stops: 0
- Distance travelled: 1,346 km (836 mi)
- Average journey time: 6h 45m
- Service frequency: Bi-weekly (Note: Runs two days in a week for every direction.)
- Train number: 22211/22212

On-board services
- Classes: AC Chair Car, Second Sitting
- Seating arrangements: Yes
- Sleeping arrangements: No
- Catering facilities: On-board Catering; E-Catering
- Observation facilities: ICF coach
- Entertainment facilities: No
- Baggage facilities: No
- Other facilities: Below the seats

Technical
- Rolling stock: 2
- Track gauge: 1,676 mm (5 ft 6 in)
- Operating speed: 57 km/h (35 mph), including halts

The Ajmer–Hazrat Nizamuddin Duronto Express is a Non-stop train belonging to North Western Railway zone that runs between Ajmer Junction and Hazrat Nizamuddin in India. It is currently being operated with 22211/22212 train numbers on bi-weekly basis.

This train now converted to a Jan Shatabdi Express due to poor demand.

== Service ==
The 22211/Ajmer – Hazrat Nizamuddin Duronto Express has an average speed of 57 km/h and covers 387 km in 6h 45m. The 22212/Hazrat Nizamuddin – Ajmer Duronto Express has an average speed of 58 km/h and covers 1346 km in 6h 40m.

== Route and halts ==
The important halts of the train are:

- Ajmer Junction
- Hazrat Nizamuddin

== Coach composite ==
The train has standard ICF rakes with max speed of 110 km/h. The train consists of 9 coaches :

- 1 AC Chair Car
- 6 Second Sitting
- 2 End-on Generator

== Traction ==
Both trains are hauled by an Abu Road Loco Shed-based WDM 3A diesel locomotive from Ajmer to Delhi and vice versa.

== See also ==
- Hazrat Nizamuddin railway station
- Ajmer Junction railway station
- Ajmer Hazrat Nizamuddin Jan Shatabdi Express
