= Shri Madhopur railway station =

Railway station in Rajasthan, India

Shri Madhopur

General information
- Location: Shri Madhopur, Sikar district, Rajasthan; India
- Coordinates: 27.457867°N 75.598409°E
- Elevation: 445 m (1,460 ft)
- System: Indian Railways station
- Owner: Indian Railways
- Operator: North Western Railway
- Line: Phuelra–Rewari line
- Platforms: 2
- Tracks: 4

Construction
- Structure type: Standard (on-ground station)
- Parking: Yes
- Cycle facilities: Yes

Other information
- Status: Single diesel line (route is electrified, but electric trains still not started)
- Station code: SMPR
- Zone(s): North Western Railway
- Division(s): Jaipur

History
- Rebuilt: Yes
Location
- Location within India Location within Rajasthan

Shri Madhopur railway station is a railway station in Sikar district, Rajasthan. Its code is SMPR. It serves Shri Madhopur city. The station consists of two platforms. Passenger, Express and Superfast trains halt here.

== Trains ==
The following trains halt at Shri Madhopur railway station in both directions:

- Rewari Phulera Express
- Chetak Express
- Chandigarh–Bandra Terminus Superfast Express
