= Narnaul railway station =

Railway Station in Haryana, India

Narnaul

General information
- Location: Narnaul, Mahendragarh district, Haryana; India
- Coordinates: 28.044515°N 76.123292°E
- System: Indian Railways station
- Owner: Indian Railways
- Operator: North Western Railway
- Line: Ahmedabad–Ajmer–Rewari line
- Platforms: 3
- Tracks: 8

Construction
- Structure type: Standard (on-ground station)
- Parking: Yes
- Cycle facilities: Yes

Other information
- Status: Tree electric line
- Station code: NNL
- Zone(s): North Western Railway
- Division(s): Jaipur

Passengers
- 1500 per day
Location
- Location within India Location within Haryana

Narnaul Railway Station is a railway station in Mahendragarh district, Haryana. Its code is NNL. It serves Narnaul town. The station consists of two platforms. Passenger, Express, and Superfast trains halt here.

== Trains ==
The following trains halt at Narnaul railway station in both directions:

- Chetak Express
- Chandigarh–Bandra Terminus Superfast Express
- Ajmer–Delhi Sarai Rohilla Jan Shatabdi Express
