= Daurai railway station =

Railway station in Rajasthan, India

Daurai
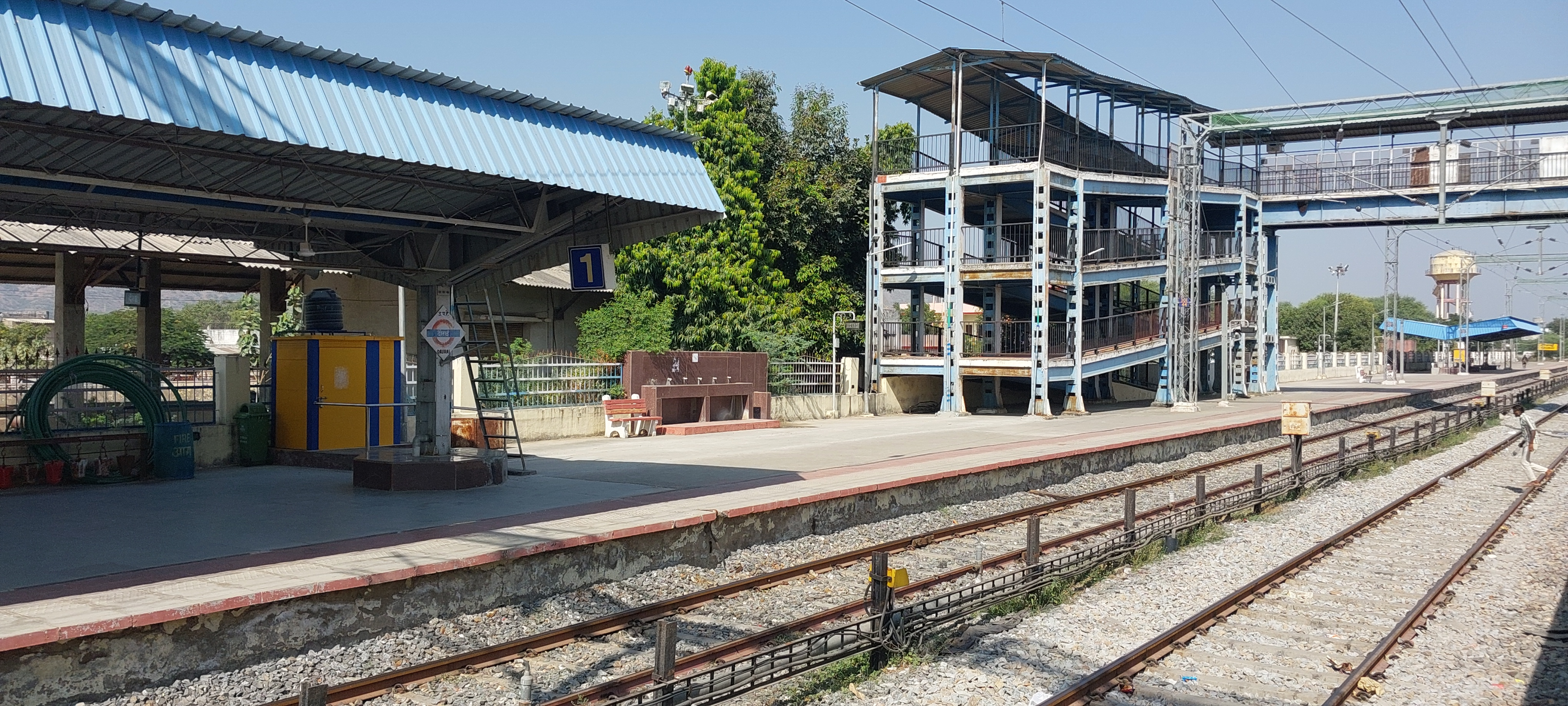
- Daurai railway station platform

General information
- Location: Ajmer, Ajmer district, Rajasthan; India
- Coordinates: 26.395479°N 74.619596°E
- System: Indian Railways station
- Owner: Indian Railways
- Operator: North Western Railway
- Line: Jaipur–Ahmedabad line
- Platforms: 1
- Tracks: 4

Construction
- Structure type: Standard (on ground station)
- Parking: Yes

Other information
- Status: Functioning
- Station code: DOZ
- Zone(s): North Western Railway
- Division(s): Ajmer
Location
- Location within India Location within Rajasthan

Daurai railway station is a railway station in Ajmer district, Rajasthan. Its code is DOZ. It serves Daurai of Ajmer. The station consists of a single platform. Passenger, Superfast trains halt here.

== Major trains ==
The following trains start from Daurai railway station:

- New Delhi–Daurai Shatabdi Express
- Goda-Daurai Weekly Express
- Daurai-Tanakpur Express
- Daurai-Kanpur Central Special
- Daurai-Samastipur Special
- Daurai-Darbhangha Special
