= Chetak Express =

Train in India

Overview
- Service type: Superfast Express
- First service: 1 October 1969; 56 years ago
- Current operator: North Western Railway

Route
- Termini: Udaipur City (UDZ); Delhi Sarai Rohilla (DEE)
- Stops: 16
- Distance travelled: 673 km (418 mi)
- Average journey time: 12 hours 10 minutes
- Service frequency: Daily
- Train number: 20473 / 20474

On-board services
- Classes: AC 2 tier, AC 3 tier, Sleeper class, General Unreserved
- Seating arrangements: Yes
- Sleeping arrangements: Yes
- Catering facilities: On-board catering, E-catering
- Observation facilities: Rake sharing with 22471/22472 Bikaner–Delhi Sarai Rohilla Intercity Express
- Baggage facilities: Available
- Other facilities: Below the seats

Technical
- Rolling stock: LHB coach
- Track gauge: 1,676 mm (5 ft 6 in)
- Operating speed: 110 km/h (68 mph) maximum, 56 km/h (35 mph) average including halts.

The 20473 / 20474 Chetak Express is a Superfast Express train belonging to Indian Railways – North Western Railway zone that runs between Udaipur City and Delhi Sarai Rohilla in India.

It operates as train number 20474 from Udaipur City to Delhi Sarai Rohilla and as train number 20473 in the reverse direction, serving the states of Rajasthan, Haryana & Delhi.

It is named after the legendary horse of Maharana Pratap – Chetak who has been immortalized in the ballads of Rajasthan. Previously this train ran as a Meter-Gauge Express till 2004 to Udaipur City & till 2007 to Chittaurgarh.

== Coaches ==
The 20474/ 20473Chetak Express has 1 AC 2 tier, 2 AC 3 tier, 8 Sleeper Class, 6 General Unreserved & 2 SLR (Seating cum Luggage Rake) Coaches. It does not carry a pantry car.

As is customary with most train services in India, coach composition may be amended at the discretion of Indian Railways depending on demand.

== Service During MG Era ==
During MG era, Chetak Express was numbered 4715 Up/4716 Dn. Service was started in 1969 between Udaipur City & Delhi Sarai Rohilla via Mavli Junction, Chittaurgarh Junction, Bhilwara, Nasirabad, Ajmer Junction, Kishangarh, Phulera Junction, Jaipur Junction, Ringas Junction, Shri Madhopur, Narnaul, Rewari, Gurgaon, Delhi Cantonment having reversal at Chittaurgarh & Jaipur. Until 2004, Timings for 4715 Up was Udaipur 18.20; Chittaurgarh 21.25/21.45; Ajmer 02.00/02.45; Jaipur 04.45/05.00; Delhi Sarai Rohilla 12.20; Timings for 4716 Dn was Delhi Sarai Rohilla 13.00; Jaipur 20.20/20.35; Ajmer 23.05/23.20; Chittaurgarh 03.35/03.55; Udaipur 07.00. Train used to cover 728 km (452 mi) kms in 18 hrs in both direction 40.44 km/h (25 mph)

== Service From 2007 Onwards ==
The 20474 Chetak Express covers the distance of 673 km (418 mi) in 12 hours 05 mins at 55.72 km/h (35 mph) & in 12 hours 05 mins as 20473 Chetak Express at 55.72 km/h (35 mph). Timings now for 20474 is Udaipur City 17.00; Chittaurgarh 18.50/19.05; Ajmer 22.20/30; Ringus 00.47/50; Delhi Sarai Rohilla 05.05. Timings now for 20473 is Delhi Sarai Rohilla 19.40; Ringus 23.28/23.31; Ajmer 02.00/10; Chittaurgarh 05.25/40; Udaipur City 07.45.

As the average speed of the train is above 55 km/h (34 mph), as per Indian Railways rules, its fare includes a Superfast surcharge.

== Routeing & Operation ==
- 20474 Chetak Express leaves Udaipur City on a daily basis and reaches Delhi Sarai Rohilla the next day.
- 20473 Chetak Express leaves Delhi Sarai Rohilla on a daily basis and reaches Udaipur City the next day.

The 20474/20473 Chetak Express runs from Udaipur City via Mavli Junction, Chittaurgarh Junction, Bhilwara, Nasirabad, Ajmer Junction, Kishangarh, Phulera Junction, Ringas Junction, Shri Madhopur, Narnaul, Rewari, Gurgaon, Delhi Cantonment to Delhi Sarai Rohilla

== Traction ==
As the route is fully electrified, it is hauled by a Gaziabad Loco Shed-based WAP-5 electric locomotive on its entire journey.

== Direction reversal ==
The train reverses its direction at;

- Chittaurgarh Junction.

== Rake sharing ==
The train sharing its rake with 22471/22472 Bikaner–Delhi Sarai Rohilla Intercity Express.
