= Chandigarh–Bandra Terminus Superfast Express =

Train in India

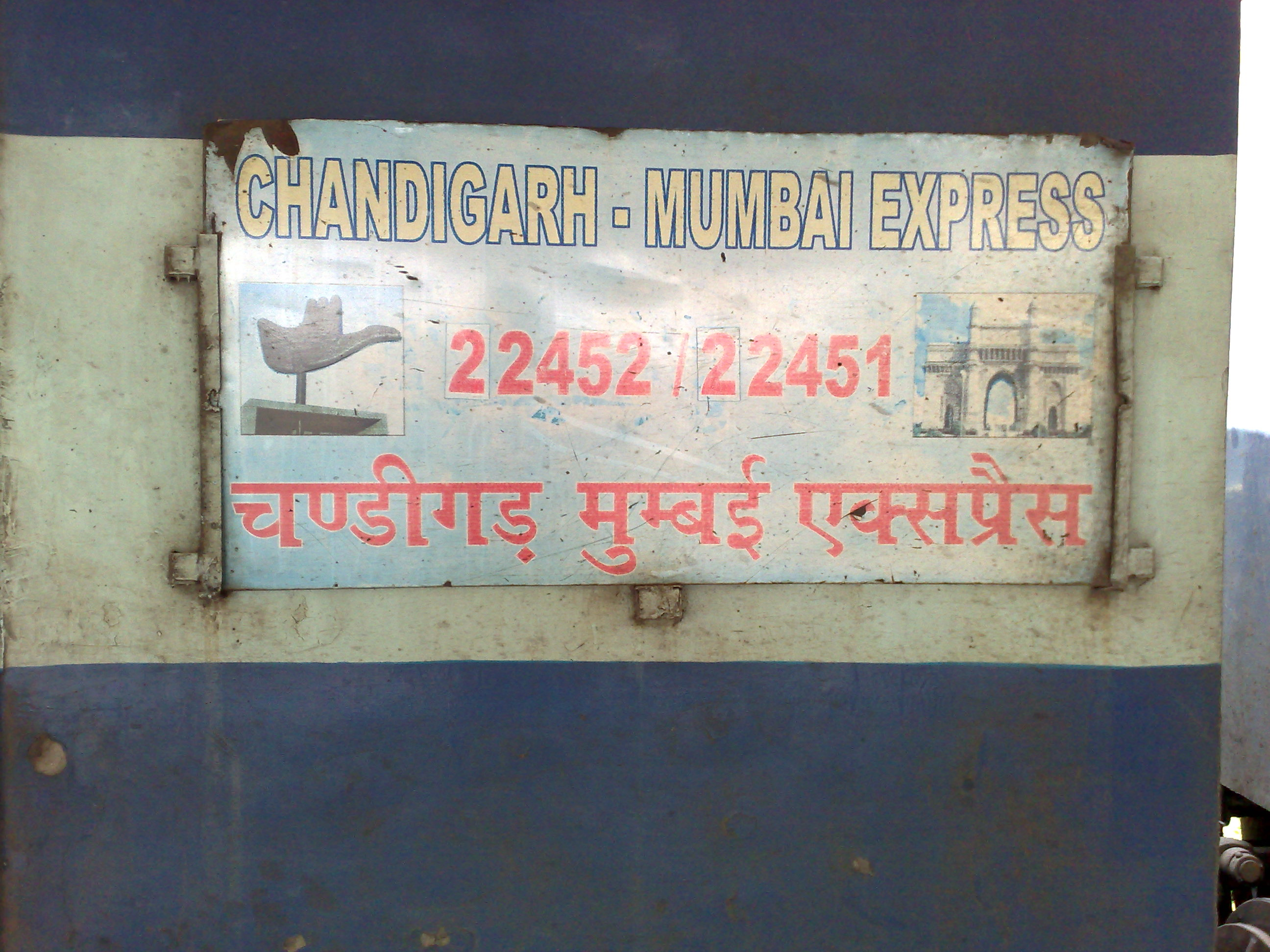

Overview
- Service type: Superfast
- Locale: Chandigarh, Haryana, Rajasthan, Gujarat & Maharashtra
- First service: 18 March 2012; 14 years ago
- Current operator: Northern Railways

Route
- Termini: Chandigarh Junction (CDG); Bandra Terminus (BDTS)
- Stops: 23
- Distance travelled: 1,605 km (997 mi)
- Average journey time: 27h 35m as 22452, 28h 05m as 22451
- Service frequency: Bi-weekly
- Train number: 22451 / 22452

On-board services
- Classes: First Ac And second Ac mix, AC 2 tier, AC 3 tier, Sleeper class, General Unreserved
- Seating arrangements: Yes
- Sleeping arrangements: Yes
- Catering facilities: On-board catering E-catering and Pantry car Available

Technical
- Rolling stock: LHB coach
- Track gauge: 1,676 mm (5 ft 6 in)
- Operating speed: 110 km/h (68 mph) maximum, 57 km/h (35 mph) average including halts
Route map
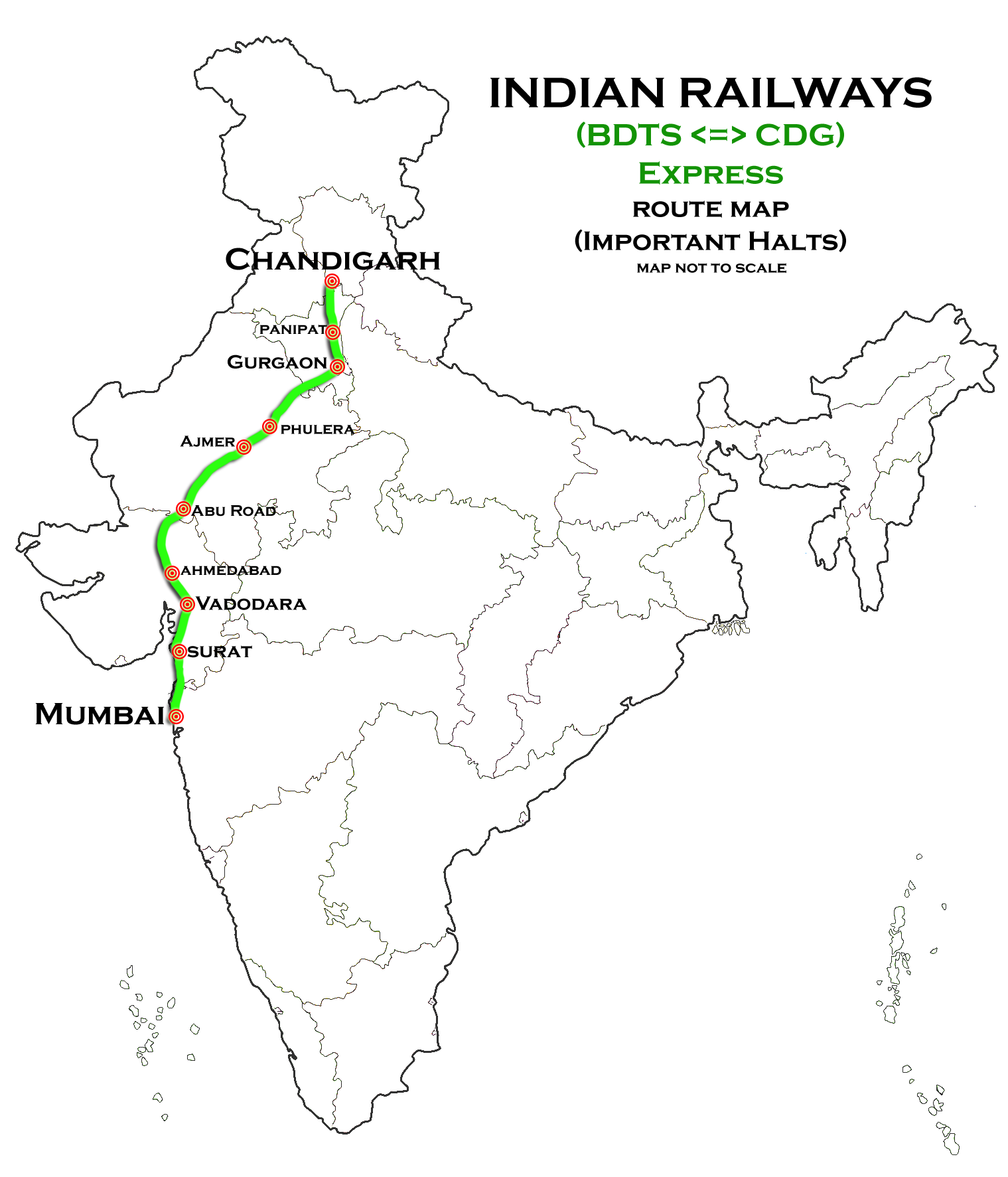

The 22451 / 22452 Chandigarh–Bandra Terminus Superfast Express is a Superfast Express train belonging to Indian Railways that runs between Chandigarh Junction and Bandra Terminus in India.

It operates as train number 22452 from Chandigarh Junction to Bandra Terminus and as train number 22451 in the reverse direction.

== Coaches ==
The train has standard LHB rakes with a maximum speed of 110 km/h. The train consists of 22 coaches:

- 1 AC I cum AC II Tier
- 2 AC II Tier
- 6 AC III Tier
- 6 Sleeper Coaches
- 4 General Unreserved
- 2 End-on Generator

As is customary with most train services in India, coach composition may be amended at the discretion of Indian Railways depending on demand.

== Service ==
22452 Chandigarh–Bandra Terminus Superfast Express covers the distance of 1605 kilometres in 27 hours 35 mins (58.19 km/h) and in 28 hours 05 mins (57.15 km/h) as 22451 Bandra Terminus–Chandigarh Superfast Express.

As the average speed of the train is above 55 km/h (34 mph), as per Indian Railways rules, its fare includes a Superfast surcharge.

== Routeing ==
The 22451 / 22452 Chandigarh–Bandra Terminus Superfast Express runs from Chandigarh Junction via Ambala Cantonment Junction, Gurgaon, Rewari Junction, Phulera Junction, Ajmer Junction, Abu Road, Ahmedabad Junction, Vadodara Junction, Surat, Borivali to Bandra Terminus and vice versa.

== Gallery ==
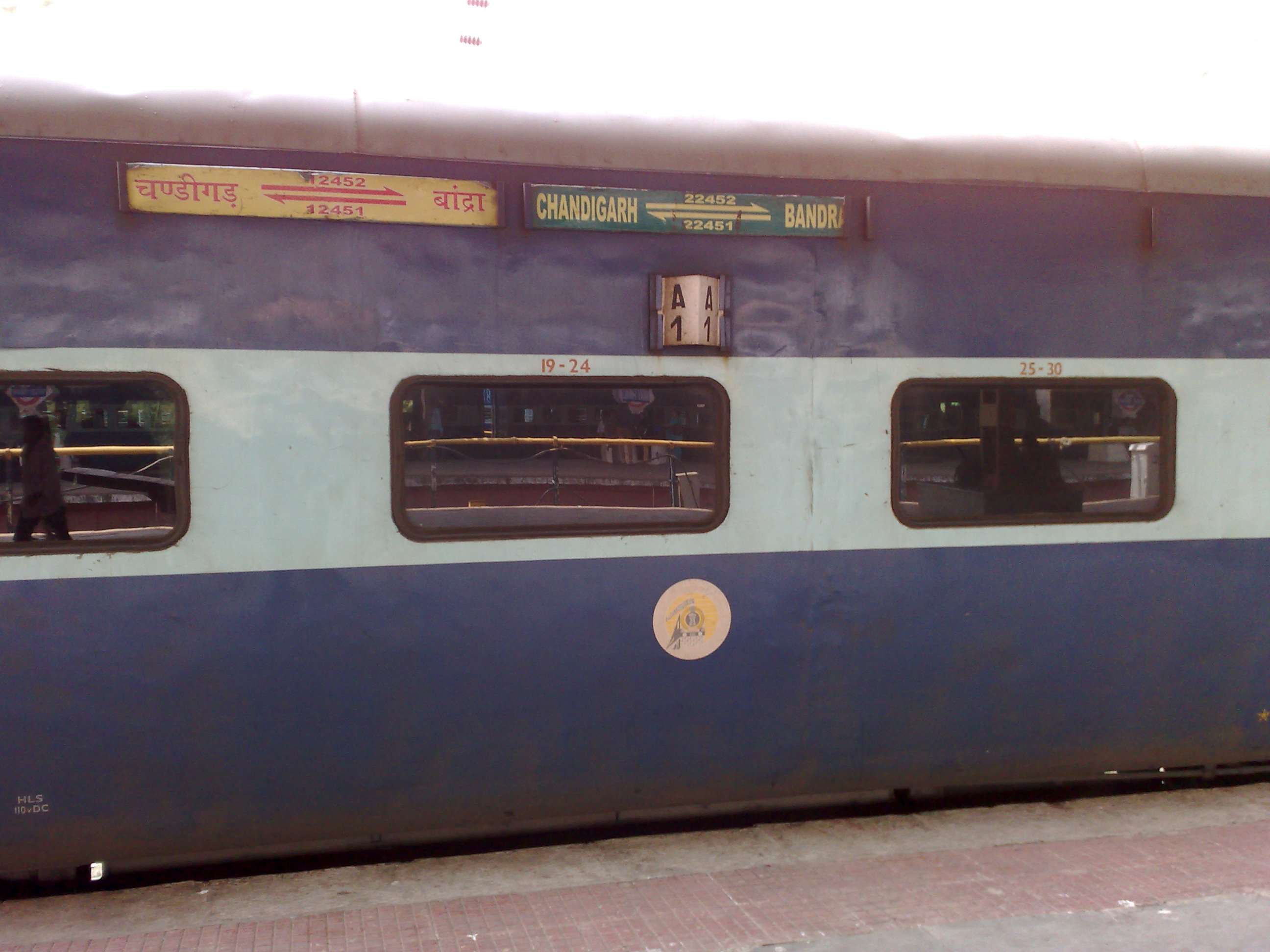
22451 Bandra Terminus–Chandigarh Superfast Express – AC 2 tier coach

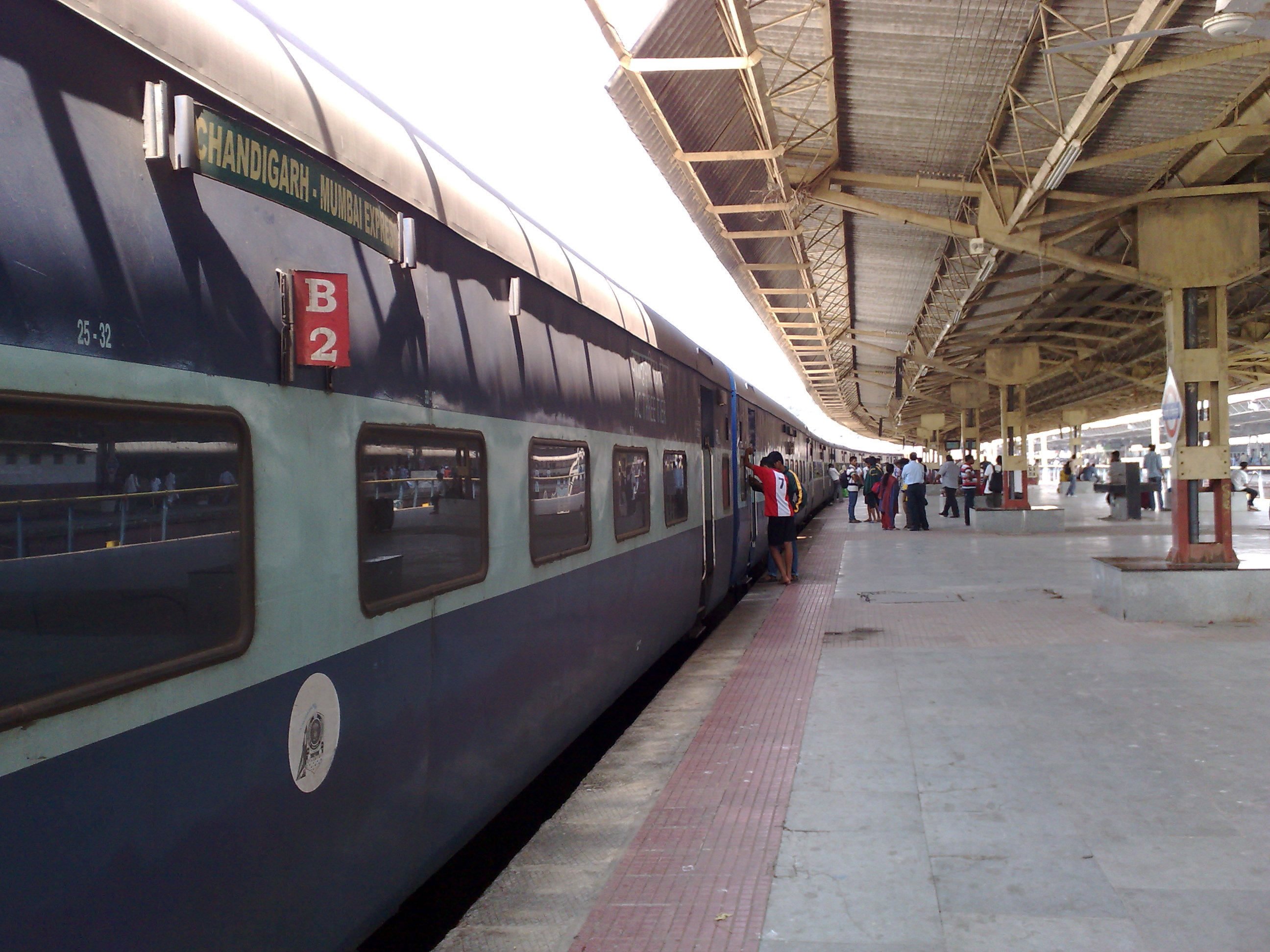
22451 Bandra Terminus–Chandigarh Superfast Express at Bandra Terminus

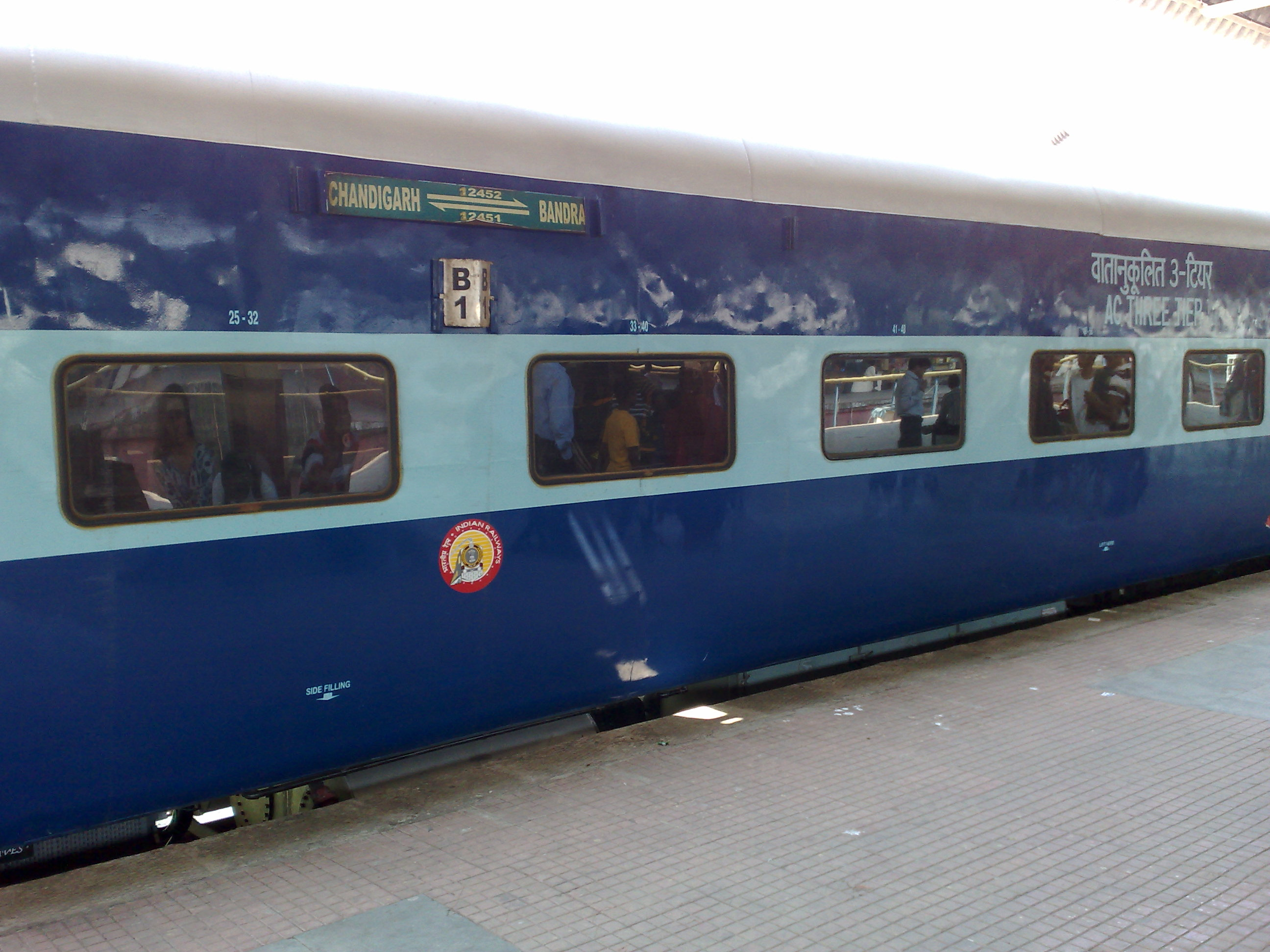
22451 Bandra Terminus–Chandigarh Superfast Express – AC 3 tier coach

== Schedule ==
Train number	Station code	Departure station	Departure time	Departure day	Arrival station	Arrival time	Arrival day
22451	BDTS	Bandra Terminus	12:15 PM	Mon, Thu	Chandigarh Junction	16:20 PM	Tue, Fri
22452	CDG	Chandigarh Junction	05:45 AM	Sun, Wed	Bandra Terminus	09:20 AM	Mon, Thu

== Traction ==
Earlier, the train was hauled end to end by a Ludhiana-based WDM-3A locomotive.

It is now hauled by a Vadodara-based WAP-7 locomotive End to End
