= Virpur railway station =

Railway station in Gujarat, India

General information
- Location: Virpur, Gujarat; India
- Coordinates: 21°50′50″N 70°42′24″E
- System: Indian Railways station
- Owner: Ministry of Railways, Indian Railways
- Operator: Western Railway
- Line: Rajkot–Somnath line
- Platforms: 2
- Tracks: 2

Construction
- Parking: No
- Cycle facilities: No

Other information
- Status: Functioning
- Station code: VRR
- Zone(s): Western Railway
- Division(s): Bhavnagar

Services
Preceding station	Indian Railways	Following station
Gondal towards Bhaktinagar	Western Railway zone Rajkot–Somnath line	Jetalsar towards Junagadh Junction
Location
- Location within India Location within Gujarat

Virpur railway station is a railway station serving in Rajkot district of Gujarat State of India. It is under Bhavnagar railway division of Western Railway Zone of Indian Railways. Virpur railway station is 58 km far away from Rajkot Junction. Passenger, Express trains halt here.

Virpur is well known for Jalaram Bapa Temple.

== Major trains ==
Following major trains halt at Virpur railway station in both directions:

- 19571/52 Rajkot–Porbandar Express
- 19251/52 Somnath–Okha Express
- 22957/58 Somnath Superfast Express
- 19119/20 Ahmedabad–Somnath Intercity Express
- 19569/70 Rajkot–Veraval Express
- 11463/64 Somnath–Jabalpur Express (via Itarsi)
- 11465/66 Somnath–Jabalpur Express (via Bina)
