= Maliya Hatina railway station =

Railway station in Gujarat, India

General information
- Location: Maliya Hatina, Junagadh district, Gujarat; India
- Coordinates: 21°09′30″N 70°17′59″E
- System: Indian Railway Station
- Owner: Ministry of Railways, Indian Railways
- Operator: Western Railway
- Line: Rajkot–Somnath line
- Platforms: 2
- Tracks: 2

Construction
- Parking: yes
- Cycle facilities: yes

Other information
- Status: Functioning
- Station code: MLHA
- Zone(s): Western Railway
- Division(s): Bhavnagar

Services
Preceding station	Indian Railways	Following station
Keshod towards Junagadh Junction	Western Railway zone Rajkot–Somnath line	Chorvad Road towards Veraval Junction
Location
- Location within India Location within Gujarat

Maliya Hatina railway station is a railway station serving in Junagadh district of Gujarat State of India. It is under Bhavnagar railway division of Western Railway Zone of Indian Railways. Maliya Hatina railway station is 30 km far away from Veraval Junction. Passenger and Express trains halt here.

== Trains ==
The following trains halt at Maliya Hatina railway station in both directions:

- 22957/58 Ahmedabad - Veraval Somnath Superfast Express
- 19119/20 Ahmedabad - Somnath Intercity Express
- 19569/70 Rajkot - Veraval Express
- 19251/52 Somnath - Okha Express
- 11463/64 Somnath - Jabalpur Express (via Itarsi)
- 11465/66 Somnath - Jabalpur Express (via Bina)
