= Navagadh railway station =

Railway station in Gujarat, India

General information
- Location: Jetpur, Navagadh, Rajkot district, Gujarat; India
- Coordinates: 21°45′50″N 70°36′59″E
- System: Indian Railway Station
- Owner: Ministry of Railways, Indian Railways
- Operator: Western Railway
- Line: Rajkot–Somnath line
- Platforms: 1
- Tracks: 1

Construction
- Parking: No
- Cycle facilities: No

Other information
- Status: Functioning
- Station code: NUD
- Zone(s): Western Railway
- Division(s): Bhavnagar

Services
Preceding station	Indian Railways	Following station
Virpur towards Gondal	Western Railway zone Rajkot–Somnath line	Jetalsar towards Junagadh Junction
Location
- Location within India Location within Gujarat

Navagadh railway station is a railway station serving in Rajkot district of Gujarat State of India. It is under Bhavnagar railway division of Western Railway Zone of Indian Railways. Navagadh railway station is 6 km from Jetalsar Junction. Passenger and Express trains halt here.

== Trains ==
The following trains halt at Navagadh railway station in both directions:

- 22957/58 Ahmedabad - Veraval Somnath Superfast Express
- 19119/20 Ahmedabad - Somnath Intercity Express
- 19569/70 Rajkot - Veraval Express
- 16333/34 Veraval - Thiruvananthapuram Express
- 19571/52 Rajkot - Porbandar Express (Via Jetalsar)
- 11087/88 Veraval - Pune Express
