= Gondal railway station =

Railway station in Gujarat, India

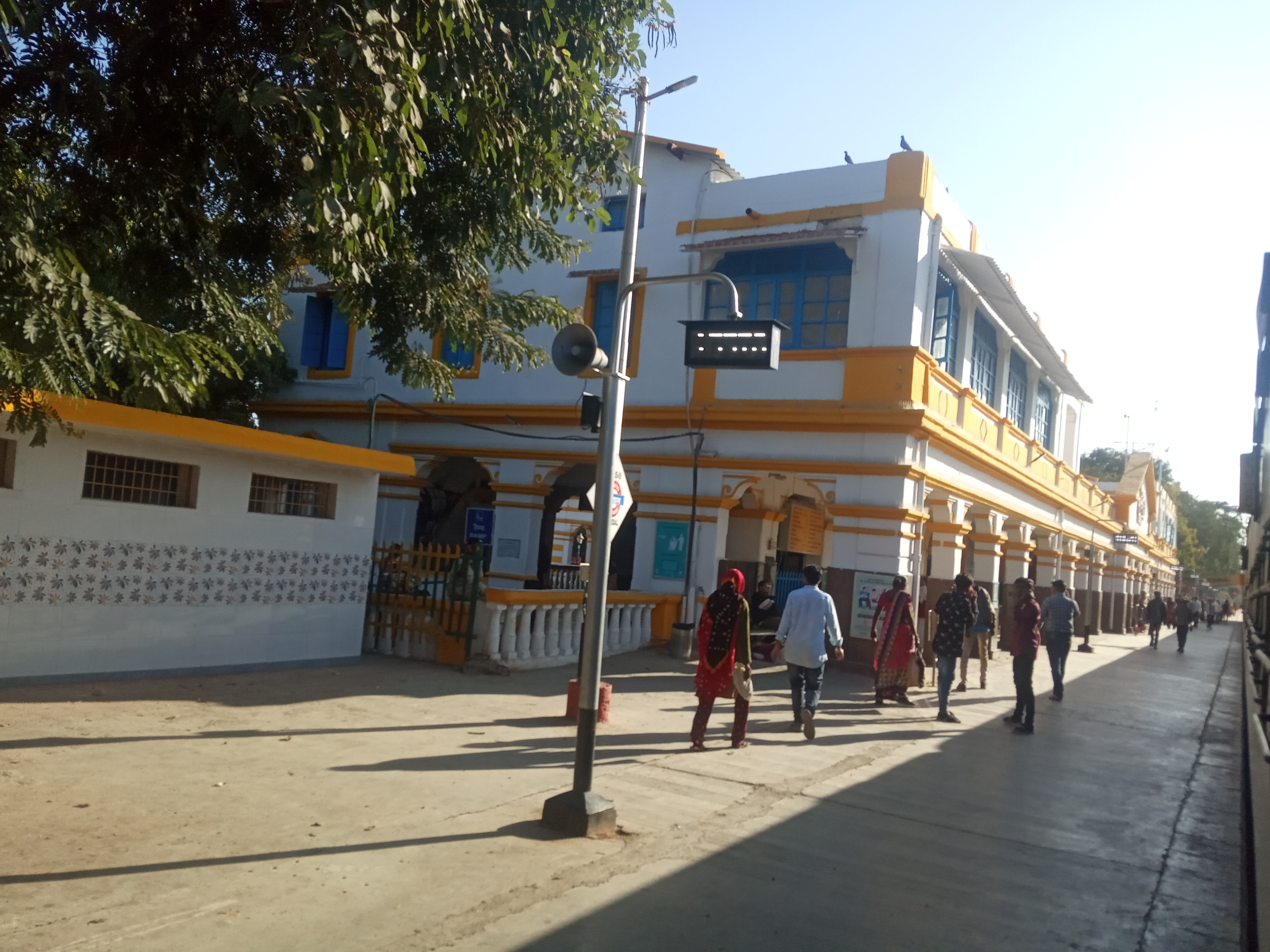
- Gondal railway station

General information
- Location: Gondal, Gujarat; India
- Coordinates: 21°58′20″N 70°47′43″E
- System: Indian Railway Station
- Owner: Ministry of Railways, Indian Railways
- Operator: Western Railway
- Line: Rajkot–Somnath line
- Platforms: 4
- Tracks: 4

Construction
- Structure type: Standard (On Ground)
- Parking: Yes
- Cycle facilities: Yes

Other information
- Status: Functioning
- Station code: GDL
- Zone(s): Western Railway
- Division(s): Bhavnagar

Services
Preceding station	Indian Railways	Following station
Bhaktinagar towards Rajkot Junction	Western Railway zone Rajkot–Somnath line	Virpur towards Navagadh
Location
- Location within Gujarat

Gondal railway station is a railway station serving Gondal town, in Rajkot district of Gujarat State of India. It is under Bhavnagar railway division of Western Railway Zone of Indian Railways.

It is located at 140 m above sea level and has three platforms. As of 2016, an electrified double broad gauge railway line exists and at this station, 27 trains stop. Rajkot Airport, is at distance of 39 kilometers.

== Major Trains ==
Following trains halt at Gondal railway station:

- 19569/70 Rajkot–Veraval Express
- 16333/34 Thiruvananthapuram–Veraval Express
- 11087/88 Veraval–Pune Express
- 22957/58 Somnath Superfast Express
- 11465/66 Somnath–Jabalpur Express (via Bina)
- 11463/64 Somnath–Jabalpur Express (via Itarsi)
- 19119/20 Gandhinagar Capital–Veraval Intercity Express
- 19251/52 Somnath–Okha Express
- 12949/50 Porbandar - Santragachi Kavi Guru Superfast Express
- 19571/52 Rajkot–Porbandar Express
