= Bhaktinagar railway station =

Railway Station in Gujarat, India

General information
- Location: Bhaktinagar, Rajkot, Gujarat; India
- Coordinates: 22°16′51″N 70°47′31″E
- Elevation: 143 m (469 ft)
- System: Indian Railways station
- Owner: Indian Railways
- Operator: Western Railway
- Line: Rajkot–Somnath line
- Platforms: 3
- Tracks: 5

Construction
- Structure type: Standard
- Parking: Yes

Other information
- Status: Functioning
- Station code: BKNG
- Zone(s): Western Railway
- Division(s): Rajkot

History
- Former names: Rajkot–Jetalsar Railway

Services
Preceding station	Indian Railways	Following station
Rajkot Junction towards Wankaner Junction	Western Railway zone Rajkot–Somnath line	Gondal towards Virpur
Location
- Location within India Location within Gujarat

Bhaktinagar railway station is a railway station in Rajkot district, Saurastra, Gujarat. Its station code is BKNG. It serves Rajkot city. The station consists of 3 platforms.

== Major trains ==
- Somnath–Okha Express
- Somnath Superfast Express
- Rajkot–Somnath Passenger
- Rajkot–Porbandar Express
- Rajkot–Veraval Passenger
- Thiruvananthapuram–Veraval Express
- Ahmedabad–Somnath Intercity Express
- Porbandar–Santragachi Kavi Guru Express
- Saurashtra Mail
- Somnath–Jabalpur Express (via Bina)
- Somnath–Jabalpur Express (via Itarsi)

== See also ==
- Rajkot Junction
- Rajkot–Somnath line
