= Keshod railway station =

Railway station in Keshod, Gujarat 362220

Keshod

General information
- Location: Keshod, Gujarat; India
- Coordinates: 21°17′52″N 70°15′06″E
- System: Indian Railway Station
- Owner: Ministry of Railways, Indian Railways
- Operator: Western Railway
- Line: Rajkot–Somnath line
- Platforms: 2
- Tracks: 2

Construction
- Structure type: Elevated
- Parking: Yes
- Cycle facilities: Yes
- Accessible: Yes

Other information
- Status: Functioning
- Station code: KSD
- Zone(s): Western Railway
- Division(s): Bhavnagar

Services
Preceding station	Indian Railways	Following station
Badodar towards Junagadh Junction	Western Railway zone Rajkot–Somnath line	Maliya Hatina towards Veraval Junction
Location

Keshod is a railway station serving in Keshod Town of Gujarat State of India. It is under Bhavnagar railway division of Western Railway Zone of Indian Railways. Keshod railway station is 40 km far away from Junagadh Junction. Passenger, Express trains halt here.

== Major trains ==
Following major trains halt at Keshod railway station in both direction:

- 19251/52 Somnath - Okha Express
- 22957/58 Gandhinagar Capital - Veraval Somnath Superfast Express
- 19119/20 Gandhinagar Capital - Somnath Intercity Express
- 19217/18 Saurashtra Janta Express
- 59558/59 Veraval - Bhavnagar Terminus Passenger
- 19569/70 Rajkot - Veraval Express
- 11463/64 Somnath - Jabalpur Express (via Itarsi)
- 11465/66 Somnath - Jabalpur Express (via Bina)
- 16333/34 Thiruvananthapuram - Veraval Express
- 11087/88 Veraval - Pune Express
