= Rajkot–Veraval Express =

Train in India

Overview
- Service type: Express
- First service: 4 August 2017; 8 years ago
- Current operator: Western Railway

Route
- Termini: Rajkot Junction (RJT); Veraval Junction (VRL)
- Stops: 8
- Distance travelled: 185 km (115 mi)
- Average journey time: 4 hours 25 mins
- Service frequency: Daily (Note: Runs seven days in a week for every direction.)
- Train number: 19569/19570

On-board services
- Classes: AC 2 tier, AC 3 tier, Sleeper class, General Unreserved
- Seating arrangements: Yes
- Sleeping arrangements: Yes
- Catering facilities: No
- Observation facilities: ICF coach
- Entertainment facilities: No
- Baggage facilities: No
- Other facilities: Below the seats

Technical
- Rolling stock: 2
- Track gauge: 1,676 mm (5 ft 6 in)
- Operating speed: 42 km/h (26 mph), including halts
Route map
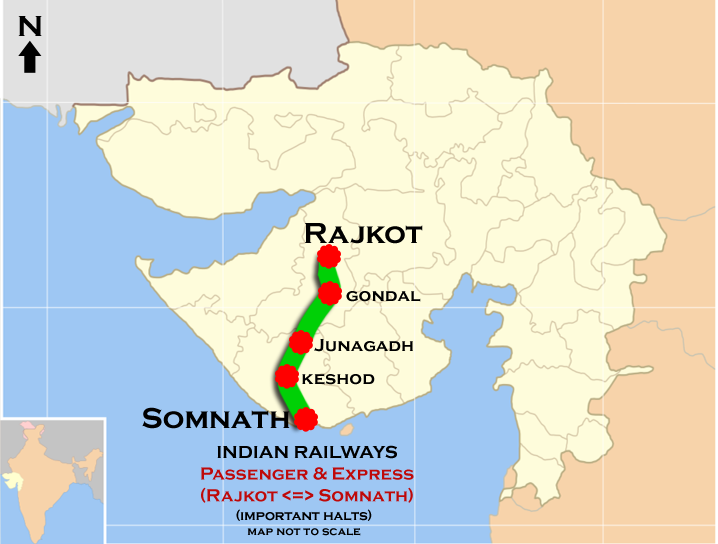

The 19569/19570 Rajkot–Veraval Express is an Express train belonging to Western Railway zone that runs between Rajkot Junction and Veraval Junction in India. It is currently being operated with 19569/19570 train numbers on a daily basis.

== Service ==
- 19569/Rajkot–Veraval Express has an average speed of 42 km/h and covers 185 km in 4 hrs 25 mins.
- 19570/Veraval–Rajkot Express has an average speed of 52 km/h and covers 185 km in 4 hrs 25 mins.

== Route and halts ==
The important halts of the train are:

- Rajkot Junction
- Bhaktinagar
- Gondal
- Gomta
- Virpur
- Navagadh
- Jetalsar Junction
- Junagadh Junction
- Badodar
- Keshod
- Maliya Hatina
- Chorvad Road
- Veraval Junction

== Coach composition ==
The train has standard ICF rakes with max speed of 110 kmph. The train consists of 20 coaches:

- 1 AC II Tier
- 2 AC III Tier
- 6 Sleeper coaches
- 9 General Unreserved
- 1 Railway Mail Service
- 2 Seating cum Luggage Rake

== Traction ==
Both trains are hauled by a Vadodara Loco Shed-based WAP-4 or WAP-7 electric locomotive from Rajkot to Veraval and vice versa.

== Rake sharing ==
The train shares its rake with 59423/59424 Rajkot–Somnath Passenger and 59421/59422 Rajkot–Veraval Passenger.

== See also ==
- Veraval Junction railway station
- Rajkot Junction railway station
- Rajkot–Veraval Passenger
- Rajkot–Somnath Passenger
