= Rajkot–Veraval Passenger =

Train in India

Overview
- Service type: Passenger
- Current operator: Western Railway

Route
- Termini: Rajkot Junction (RJT); Veraval Junction (VRL)
- Stops: 19
- Distance travelled: 185 km (115 mi)
- Average journey time: 4h 25m
- Service frequency: Daily (Note: Runs seven days in a week for every direction.)
- Train number: 59423/59424

On-board services
- Class: Unreserved
- Seating arrangements: Yes
- Sleeping arrangements: No
- Catering facilities: No
- Observation facilities: ICF coach
- Entertainment facilities: No
- Baggage facilities: No
- Other facilities: Below the seats

Technical
- Rolling stock: 2
- Track gauge: 1,676 mm (5 ft 6 in)
- Operating speed: 42 km/h (26 mph) average with halts
Route map
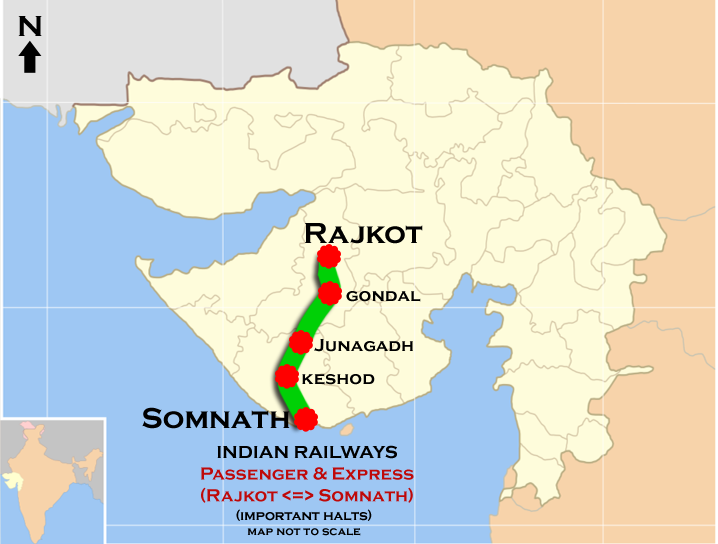

The Rajkot–Veraval Passenger is a Passenger train belonging to Western Railway zone that runs between Rajkot Junction and Veraval Junction. It is currently being operated with 59423/59424 train numbers on a daily basis.

== Average speed and frequency ==
- The 59423/Rajkot–Veraval Passenger runs with an average speed of 42 km/h and covers 185 km in 4h 25m.
- The 59424/Veraval–Rajkot Passenger runs with an average speed of 40 km/h and completes 185 km in 4h 50m.

== Route and halts ==
The important halts of the train are:

- Rajkot Junction
- Bhaktinagar
- Jetalsar Junction
- Junagadh Junction
- Keshod
- Chorvad Road
- Veraval Junction

== Coach composition ==
The train has standard ICF rakes with a maximum speed of 110 km/h. The train consists of 11 coaches:

- 9 General Unreserved
- 2 Seating cum Luggage Rake

== Traction ==
Both trains are hauled by a Ratlam Loco Shed-based WDM-3A diesel locomotive from Rajkot to Veraval and vice versa.

== Rake sharing ==
The train shares its rake with 59421/59422 Rajkot–Somnath Passenger and 19569/19570 Rajkot–Veraval Express.

== See also ==
- Veraval Junction railway station
- Rajkot Junction railway station
- Rajkot–Veraval Express
- Rajkot–Somnath Passenger
