= Muli Road railway station =

Railway station in Gujarat, India

General information
- Location: Muli, Gujarat; India
- Coordinates: 22°40′35″N 71°26′07″E
- Elevation: 107 metres (351 ft)
- System: Indian Railway Station
- Owner: Ministry of Railways, Indian Railways
- Operator: Western Railway
- Line: Viramgam–Okha line
- Platforms: 2
- Tracks: 2

Construction
- Structure type: Standard (On Ground)
- Parking: No

Other information
- Status: Functioning
- Station code: MOL
- Zone(s): Western Railway
- Division(s): Rajkot
Location
- Location within India Location within Gujarat

Muli Road railway station is a railway station on the Western Railway network in the state of Gujarat, India. Muli Road railway station is 22 km far away from Surendranagar railway station. Three Passenger and an Express trains halt here.

== Nearby stations ==
Ramparda is the nearest railway station towards Wankaner Junction, whereas Digsar is the nearest railway station towards Surendranagar Junction.

== Trains ==
The following Express train halt at Muli Road railway station in both directions:

== See also ==
- Surendranagar district
