= Gomta railway station =

Railway station in Gujarat, India

General information
- Location: Gomta, Rajkot district, Gujarat; India
- Coordinates: 21°52′24″N 70°43′45″E
- System: Indian Railway Station
- Owner: Ministry of Railways, Indian Railways
- Operator: Western Railway
- Line: Rajkot–Somnath line
- Platforms: 1
- Tracks: 1

Construction
- Parking: No
- Cycle facilities: No

Other information
- Status: Functioning
- Station code: GTT
- Zone(s): Western Railway
- Division(s): Bhavnagar
Location
- Location within India Location within Gujarat

Gomta railway station is a railway station serving in Rajkot district of Gujarat State of India. It is under Bhavnagar railway division of Western Railway Zone of Indian Railways. Gomta railway station is 23 km away from Jetalsar Junction. Passenger, Express trains halt here.

== Trains ==
The following trains halt at Gomta railway station in both directions:

- 19569/70 Rajkot - Veraval Express
