= Veraval–Pune Express =

Train in India

Veraval-Pune Express
Overview
- Service type: Express
- Current operator: Central Railway

Route
- Termini: Veraval Junction (VRL); Pune Junction (PUNE)
- Stops: 24
- Distance travelled: 1,057 km (657 mi)
- Average journey time: 20 hours 55 minutes
- Service frequency: Weekly (Note: Runs one days in a week for every direction.)
- Train number: 11087 / 11088

On-board services
- Classes: AC First Class, AC 2 tier, AC 3 tier, Sleeper Class, General Unreserved
- Seating arrangements: Yes
- Sleeping arrangements: Yes
- Catering facilities: On-board Catering
- Observation facilities: Rake sharing with 11089/11090, 11091/11092, 11095/11096, 12103/12104
- Baggage facilities: No
- Other facilities: Below the seats

Technical
- Rolling stock: 2
- Track gauge: 1,676 mm (5 ft 6 in)
- Operating speed: 51 km/h (32 mph) average including halts.

The 11087 / 11088 Veraval-Pune Express is an express train of the Indian Railways connecting Pune in Maharashtra and Veraval Junction of Saurashtra. It is currently being operated with 11087/11088 train numbers on a weekly basis.

== Coach composition ==
The train has standard ICF rakes with maximum speed of 110 km/h. The train consists of 22 coaches :

- 1 AC First Class
- 1 AC II Tier
- 6 AC III Tier
- 10 Sleeper Coaches
- 2 General Unreserved
- 2 Seating cum Luggage Rake

Loco	1	2	3	4	5	6	7	8	9	10	11	12	13	14	15	16	17	18	19	20	21	22
	SLR	GEN	A1	H1	B1	B2	B3	B4	B5	B6	S1	S2	S3	S4	S5	S6	S7	S8	S9	S10	GEN	SLR

== Service ==
The 11091/Veraval - Pune Express has an average speed of 52 km/h and covers 1057 km in 20 hrs 15 mins.

The 11088/Pune - Veraval Express has an average speed of 51 km/h and covers 1057 km in 20 hrs 55 mins.

As the average speed of the train is below 55 km/h, its fare does not include a superfast surcharge.

== Route and halts ==
The important halts of the train are:

- Veraval Junction
- Keshod
- Junagadh Junction
- Navagadh
- Gondal
- Rajkot Junction
- Wankaner Junction
- Surendranagar Junction
- Viramgam Junction
- Ahmedabad Junction
- Nadiad Junction
- Anand Junction
- Vadodara Junction
- Bharuch Junction
- Surat
- Navsari
- Valsad
- Vapi
- Dahanu Road
- Vasai Road
- Bhiwandi Road
- Kalyan Junction
- Karjat
- Lonavala
- Shivaji Nagar
- Pune Junction

== Rakes sharing ==
The train shares its rake with:

- 11091/11092 Bhuj - Pune Express
- 11089/11090 Bhagat Ki Kothi – Pune Express
- 11095/11096 Ahimsa Express
- 12103/12104 Pune - Lucknow Superfast Express

== Traction ==
Both trains are hauled by a Vadodara Loco Shed based WAP-5 or Vadodara Loco Shed based WAP-7 electric locomotive from Veraval to Pune.
