= Wankaner Junction railway station =

Railway station in Gujarat, India

General information
- Location: Wankaner, Morbi district, Gujarat; India
- Coordinates: 22°37′20″N 70°57′48″E
- Elevation: 87 m (285 ft)
- System: Indian Railways station
- Operator: Western Railway
- Lines: Viramgam–Okha line Maliya Miyana–Wankaner section
- Platforms: 4
- Tracks: 8

Construction
- Structure type: Standard (on ground)
- Parking: Yes

Other information
- Status: Functioning
- Station code: WKR
- Zone(s): Western Railway
- Division(s): Rajkot

History
- Opened: 1890
- Former names: Morvi State Railway
Location
- Location within India Location within Gujarat

Wankaner Junction railway station is located in Wankaner city of Morbi district, Gujarat. It is under Rajkot division of Western Railway. Its code is WKR. It has four platforms. Passenger, DEMU, Express, and Superfast trains halt here.

Wankaner Junction is well connected by rail to Veraval Junction, Okha, Porbandar, Hapa, Jamnagar, Rajkot Junction, Morbi, Gandhidham Junction, Ahmedabad Junction, Bilaspur Junction, Gorakhpur Junction, Rameswaram, Delhi Sarai Rohilla, Rewa, Secunderabad Junction, Shri Mata Vaishno Devi Katra, Thiruvananthapuram, Muzaffarpur Junction, Pune Junction, Jabalpur Junction, Indore Junction, Nathdwara, Kamakhya, Bandra Terminus and Mumbai Central.

== History ==
The Morvi-Wankaner section was laid as a 2 ft 6inch road side tram way in the year 1890 by Morvi Railway under the regime of Sir Waghji Thakor. Wadhwan–ajkot metre-auge section of Morvi State Railway laid in the year 1890. Rajkot–Wadhwan section was completed in the year 1905 by Morvi State Railway. Later Morvi–ankaner section was converted to metre gauge in 1924 to match rail lines of other state.

== Railway reorganization ==
Morvi State Railway was merged into the Western Railway on 5 November 1951. It was the last Steam engine hauled section in India in the year 2000. Before railbuses took over on Wankaner–Morvi, there were two-coach trains hauled by YG or YP steam locos (these were the last steam-hauled trains on those routes). Wankaner–Maliya Miyana section Conversion to broad gauge was completed in the year 2001.

== Trains ==
The following trains halt at Wankaner Junction railway station in both directions:

- 22939/40 Hapa–Bilaspur Superfast Express
- 22957/58 Somnath Superfast Express
- 19215/16 Saurashtra Express
- 15045/46 Gorakhpur–Okha Express
- 16733/34 Rameswaram–Okha Express
- 19263/64 Porbandar–Delhi Sarai Rohilla Express
- 17017/18 Rajkot–Secunderabad Express
- 22959/60 Surat–Jamnagar Intercity Express
- 22961/62 Surat–Hapa Intercity Express
- 12475/76 Hapa–Shri Mata Vaishno Devi Katra Sarvodaya Express
- 12477/78 Jamnagar–Shri Mata Vaishno Devi Katra Express
- 22945/46 Saurashtra Mail
- 16333/34 Thiruvananthapuram–Veraval Express
- 19579/80 Rajkot–Delhi Sarai Rohilla Weekly Express
- 19269/70 Porbandar–Muzaffarpur Express
- 11087/88 Veraval–Pune Express
- 11465/66 Somnath–Jabalpur Express (via Bina)
- 11463/64 Somnath–Jabalpur Express (via Itarsi)
- 19119/20 Ahmedabad–Somnath Intercity Express
- 19319/20 Veraval–Indore Mahamana Express
- 19575/76 Okha–Nathdwara Express
- 22937/38 Rajkot–Rewa Superfast Express
- 15667/68 Kamakhya–Gandhidham Express
- 22923/24 Bandra Terminus–Jamnagar Humsafar Express

Wankaner–Morbi DEMU and Wankaner–Rajkot DEMU start from here.
