= Delvada railway station =

Railway station in Gujarat, India

General information
- Location: Delvada, Gir Somnath district India
- Coordinates: 20°46′24″N 71°02′30″E
- Elevation: 14 m (46 ft)
- System: Indian Railway Station
- Owner: Ministry of Railways, Indian Railways
- Operator: Western Railway
- Line: Veraval–Delvada section
- Platforms: 1
- Tracks: 1

Construction
- Structure type: Standard (On Ground)
- Parking: No

Other information
- Status: Functioning
- Station code: DVA
- Zone(s): Western Railway
- Division(s): Bhavnagar
Location
- Location within Gujarat

Delvada railway station is a railway station on the Western Railway network in the state of Gujarat, India. Delvada railway station is 160 km far away from Junagadh Junction railway station. Passenger trains halt here.

== Major trains ==
- 52949/52950 Delvada - Veraval MG Passenger (UnReserved)
- 52951/52952 Delvada - Junagadh MG Passenger (UnReserved)

== See also ==
- Gir Somnath district
