= Chorvad Road railway station =

Railway station in Gujarat, India

General information
- Location: Chorvad, Junagadh district, Gujarat; India
- Coordinates: 21°03′12″N 70°17′25″E
- System: Indian Railway Station
- Owner: Ministry of Railways, Indian Railways
- Operator: Western Railway
- Line: Rajkot–Somnath line
- Platforms: 2
- Tracks: 2

Construction
- Parking: No
- Cycle facilities: No

Other information
- Status: Functioning
- Station code: CVR
- Zone(s): Western Railway
- Division(s): Bhavnagar
Location
- Location within India Location within Gujarat

Chorvad Road railway station is a railway station serving in Junagadh district of Gujarat State of India. It is under Bhavnagar railway division of Western Railway Zone of Indian Railways. Chorvad Road railway station is 18 km far away from Veraval Junction. Passenger and Express trains halt here.

== Trains ==
The following trains halt at Chorvad Road railway station in both directions:

- 22957/58 Ahmedabad - Veraval Somnath Superfast Express
- 19119/20 Ahmedabad - Somnath Intercity Express
- 19569/70 Rajkot - Veraval Express
