= Badodar railway station =

Railway station in Gujarat, India

Badodar

General information
- Location: Badodar, Junagadh district, Gujarat; India
- Coordinates: 21°20′53″N 70°16′58″E
- System: Indian Railway Station
- Owner: Ministry of Railways, Indian Railways
- Operator: Western Railway
- Line: Rajkot–Somnath line
- Platforms: 1
- Tracks: 1

Construction
- Parking: No
- Cycle facilities: No

Other information
- Status: Functioning
- Station code: BDDR
- Zone(s): Western Railway
- Division(s): Bhavnagar
Location

Badodar is a railway station serving in Junagadh district of Gujarat State of India. It is under Bhavnagar railway division of Western Railway Zone of Indian Railways. Badodar railway station is 29 km away from Junagadh Junction. Passenger trains halt here.

== Trains ==
The following trains halt at Badodar railway station in both directions:

- 59424 Veraval - Rajkot Passenger
- 59421 Rajkot - Veraval Passenger
- 59559 Veraval - Bhavnagar Terminus Passenger
