= Somnath–Okha Express =

Train in India

Overview
- Service type: Express
- Locale: Gujarat
- First service: 12 April 2013; 12 years ago
- Current operator(s): Western Railway

Route
- Termini: Somnath (SMNH); Okha (OKHA)
- Stops: 15
- Distance travelled: 442 km (275 mi)
- Average journey time: 9 hours 15 minutes
- Service frequency: Daily
- Train number(s): 19251 / 19252

On-board services
- Class(es): AC First Class, AC 2 Tier, AC 3 Tier, Sleeper Class, General Unreserved
- Seating arrangements: Yes
- Sleeping arrangements: Yes
- Catering facilities: No catering available
- Observation facilities: Large windows
- Baggage facilities: No
- Other facilities: Below the seats

Technical
- Rolling stock: LHB coach
- Track gauge: 1,676 mm (5 ft 6 in)
- Operating speed: 47 km/h (29 mph) average including halts.
Route map
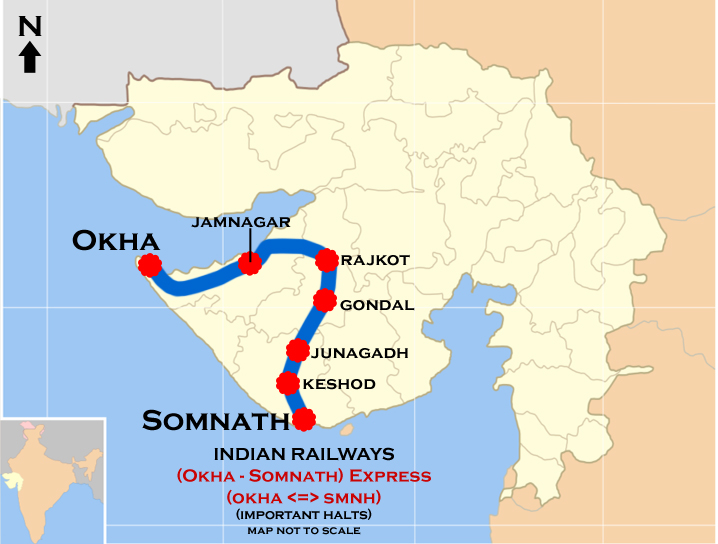

The 19251 / 19252 Somnath–Okha Express is an express train belonging to Western Railway zone that runs between Somnath and Okha in India. It is currently being operated with 19251/19252 train numbers on a daily basis.

== Coach composition ==
The train has standard LHB rakes with a max speed of 130 km/h. But operating at a maximum speed of 110 kmph. The train consists of 22 coaches:

- 1 AC 1st Class
- 3 AC II Tier
- 4 AC III Tier
- 2 AC III Tier Economy
- 6 Sleeper coaches
- 4 General Unreserved
- 2 Seating cum Generator Car

== Service ==
- 19251/Somnath–Okha Express has an average speed of 45 km/h and covers 442 km in 9 hrs 25 mins.
- 19252/Okha–Somnath Express has an average speed of 47 km/h and covers 442 km in 9 hrs 10 mins.

== Route and halts ==
The important halts of the train are:

- Somnath
- Veraval Junction
- Maliya Hatina
- Keshod
- Junagadh Junction
- Jetalsar Junction
- Virpur
- Gondal
- Bhaktinagar
- Rajkot Junction
- Hapa
- Jamnagar
- Khambhalia
- Bhatiya
- Dwarka
- Mithapur
- Okha

== Schedule ==
Train number	Station code	Departure station	Departure time	Departure day	Arrival station	Arrival time	Arrival day
19251	SMNH	Somnath	22:50 PM	Daily	Okha	08:15 AM	Daily
19252	OKHA	Okha	20:15 PM	Daily	Somnath	05:25 AM	Daily

== Direction reversal ==
Train reverses its direction 1 times at:

- Rajkot Junction

== Traction ==
Both trains are hauled by a Vadodara Loco Shed-based WAP-5 electric locomotive from Somnath to Okha and vice versa.
