= Lakhtar railway station =

Railway station in Gujarat, India

General information
- Location: Lakhtar, Gujarat; India
- Coordinates: 22°52′23″N 71°46′36″E
- Elevation: 42 metres (138 ft)
- System: Indian Railways station
- Owner: Ministry of Railways, Indian Railways
- Operator: Western Railway
- Line: Viramgam–Okha line
- Platforms: 2
- Tracks: 2

Construction
- Structure type: Standard (on ground)
- Parking: No

Other information
- Status: Functioning
- Station code: LTR
- Zone(s): Western Railway
- Division(s): Rajkot
Location
- Location within India Location within Gujarat

Lakhtar railway station is a railway station on the Western Railway network in the state of Gujarat, India. Lakhtar railway station is 21 km far away from Surendranagar railway station. Two Passenger, two Express, and one Superfast trains halt here.

== Nearby stations ==
Bajrangpura is the nearest railway station towards Surendranagar Junction, whereas Kesariya Road is the nearest railway station towards Viramgam Junction .

== Trains ==
Following Express and Superfast trains halt at Lakhtar railway station in both direction:

- 22945/46 Saurashtra Mail
- 19570 Veraval–Mumbai Central Express

== See also ==
- Surendranagar district
