= Veraval–Indore Mahamana Express =

Train in India

Veraval - Indore Junction Mahamana Express
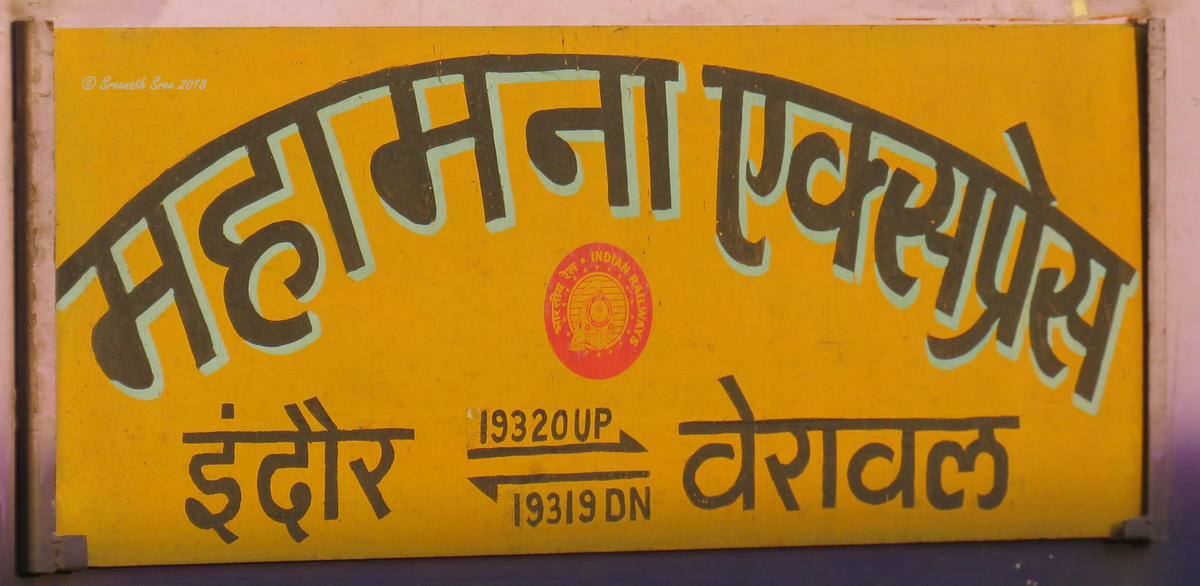
- Indore-Veraval Mahamana Express train board.

Overview
- Service type: Mahamana Express
- First service: 29 June 2018; 7 years ago
- Current operator: Western Railway

Route
- Termini: Veraval Junction (VRL); Indore Junction (INDB)
- Stops: 9
- Distance travelled: 937 km (582 mi)
- Average journey time: 19 hrs 40 mins
- Service frequency: Weekly (Note: Runs one day in a week for every direction.)
- Train number: 19319 / 19320

On-board services
- Classes: AC 2 Tier, AC 3 Tier, Sleeper Class, General Unreserved
- Seating arrangements: Yes
- Sleeping arrangements: Yes
- Catering facilities: E-Catering
- Baggage facilities: No
- Other facilities: Below the seats

Technical
- Rolling stock: ICF-Mahamana
- Track gauge: 1,676 mm (5 ft 6 in)
- Operating speed: 48 km/h (30 mph) average including halts.

The 19319 / 19320 Veraval–Indore Mahamana Express is an Indian express train belonging to Western Railway zone that runs between Veraval Junction and Indore Junction in India. It is currently operated once a week with 19319/19320 train numbers.

== Coach composition ==
The train has LHB rakes with a maximum speed of 110 kilometres per hour (68 mph). The train consists of 22 coaches :

- 1 First AC
- 2 AC II Tier
- 6 AC III Tier
- 8 Sleeper Coaches
- 3 General Unreserved
- 2 EOG Cars

== Service ==
The 19319 Veraval - Indore Mahamana Express has an average speed of 46 kilometres per hour (29 mph) and covers 937 kilometres (582 mi) in 20 hrs 30 mins.

The 19320 Indore - Veraval Mahamana Express has an average speed of 48 kilometres per hour (30 mph) and covers the distance in 19 hrs 40 mins.

== Route and halts ==
The important stops of the train are:

- Veraval Junction
- Junagadh Junction
- Rajkot Junction
- Wankaner Junction
- Surendranagar Junction
- Ahmedabad Junction
- Godhra Junction
- Ratlam Junction
- Ujjain Junction
- Dewas Junction
- Indore Junction

== Schedule ==
Train number	Station code	Departure station	Departure time	Departure day	Arrival station	Arrival time	Arrival day
19319	VRL	Veraval Junction	08:45 am	Thursday	Indore Junction	05:15 am	Friday
19320	INDB	Indore Junction	22:25 pm	Tuesday	Veraval Junction	18:05 pm	Wednesday

== Rake sharing ==
The train shares its rake with 19333/19334 Indore - Bikaner Mahamana Express.

== Traction ==
earlier was WDM-3A. Both trains are hauled by a Vadodara Loco Shed based WAP-5 and WAP-7 electric locomotives from Indore to Veraval and vice versa.
