= Kodinar railway station =

Railway station in Gujarat, India

General information
- Location: Kodinar, Gir Somnath district India
- Coordinates: 20°47′50″N 70°41′44″E
- Elevation: 16 m (52 ft)
- System: Indian Railway Station
- Owner: Ministry of Railways, Indian Railways
- Operator: Western Railway
- Line: Veraval - Kodinar line
- Platforms: 1
- Tracks: 4

Construction
- Structure type: Standard (On Ground)
- Parking: No
- Accessible: No

Other information
- Status: Halted (Stay)
- Station code: KODR
- Zone(s): Western Railway
- Division(s): Bhavnagar

History
- Opened: 1 June 1970
- Closed: 23 September 2015
Location
- Location within Gujarat

Kodinar railway station is a railway station on the Western Railway network in the state of Gujarat, India. Kodinar railway station is 42 km away from Veraval Junction railway station. This Station is Closed due to Less Traffic and No Funding by The Government and It Maybe Opened after the Gauge Conversion

== See also ==
- Gir Somnath district
