= Limbdi railway station =

Railway station in Gujarat, India

General information
- Location: Limbdi, Gujarat; India
- Coordinates: 22°33′57″N 71°47′23″E
- Elevation: 50 m (164.0 ft)
- System: Indian Railway Station
- Owner: Ministry of Railways, Indian Railways
- Operator: Western Railway
- Line: Surendranagar–Bhavnagar line
- Platforms: 2
- Tracks: 2

Construction
- Parking: No
- Cycle facilities: No

Other information
- Status: Functioning
- Station code: LM
- Zone(s): Western Railway
- Division(s): Bhavnagar
Location
- Location within India Location within Gujarat

Limbdi railway station is a railway station serving in Surendranagar district of Gujarat State of India. It is under Bhavnagar railway division of Western Railway Zone of Indian Railways. Limbdi railway station is 28 km far away from Surendranagar Junction. Passenger, Express and Superfast trains halt here.

== Major trains ==
The following trains halt at Limbdi railway station in both directions:

- 12945/46 Surat - Mahuva Superfast Express
- 12971/72 Bhavnagar Terminus - Bandra Terminus SF Express
- 19579/80 Bhavnagar Terminus - Delhi Sarai Rohilla Link Express

== See also ==
- Bhavnagar State Railway
