= Bhayavadar, Gujarat =

Bhayavadar
- Village
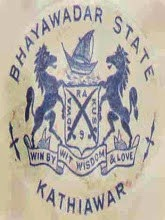

- Location in Gujarat, India Bhayavadar (India)
- Coordinates: 21°41′50″N 70°59′45″E
- Country: India
- State: Gujarat
- District: Amreli
- Founder: Bhaya Nathu Wala (1st Darbar saheb of bhayavadar)

Languages
  - Official: Gujarati, Hindi
- Time zone: UTC+5:30 (IST)
- Vehicle registration: GJ 14
- Website: http://bhayavadarstate.weebly.com

Bhayavadar is a small village in the Kunkavav Vadia Taluka of the Amreli district in Gujarat, India. The Patels form the majority of the village 1539 village residents.

A large temple, called Swaminarayan Mandir, is the main attraction of Bhayavadar. A fair is organized every year in the village, which is quite popular among the villagers and people from the nearby villages and towns. Another holy place in the village is Makanbapa Sevadham Sankul, which is situated just outside the village. Many people come to this place to attain happiness. The nearest airport and railway station are Amreli Airport and Amreli Railway Station, respectively.

== Geography ==
Located 30 km (18.5 mi) southwest of the city of Amreli and 282 km (175 mi) northwest of the state capital of Gandhinagar, Bhayavadar borders the nearby districts of Amreli and Junagadh.

== Demographics ==
Bhayavadar is inhabited by a total of 310 families, making up a total population of 1539 people, 767 are male and 772 are female. (Indian Census 2011) Residents of Bhayavadar speak Gujarati is the local language, and is spoken by the majority of the residents. The village is accepting of persons of different castes, with persons of different backgrounds living harmoniously and peacefully in the village.

The population of Bhayavadar is made up of 10.46% children aged from 0–6. The average sex ratio of Bhayavadar is 1.007, which is higher than the Gujarat State average of 0.919 while the child sex ratio of Bhayavadar as per the census is 0.851, lower than Gujarat's average of 0.890.

Compared with the State average, Bhayavadar has a relatively high literacy rate, sitting at 78.66% in 2011, compared to 78.03% of Gujarat. Male literacy percentage in Bhayavadar stands at 86.62% while for the females it is at much lower, sitting at 70.92%.

== Administration ==
In accordance with the Constitution of India and Panchyati Raj Act, the village is governed by a Sarpanch, who is an elected representative of the village.

The administrative structure consists of eight members, including the Sarpanch. Under the Sarpanch, there are 7 panchayat members, who act as advisers to the Sarpanch. These 7 members are called Panches. The administrative system does not discriminate members based on gender, caste, or creed.

The political affinity of the village inhabitants is mixed. When it comes to electing political party representatives, it is done based on the development work done by the incumbent party members.

The latest election was held in December 2016 and Shrimati Kanchanben Lunagariya was elected as Sarpanch. Eight other people were elected as panchayat members.

The main person behind the development of the village is regarded to be Bhaya Nathu Wala. He is said to be the king and founder of Bhayavadar Village.

== Infrastructural Amenities ==
The villagers are nourished with a good drinking water supply as well as a stable electricity supply. Telephones are common here, and nearly all houses have cable televisions.

The village entrance has a big Chabutro and a welcome gate. The basic facilities that are available in the village are:

- Government Middle School (up to Standard 8)
- Waterworks with a Water Purifier Plant
- Village Commonplace - Panchayat Ghar
- Wide roads and streets in the village
- Regular bus services, connecting the nearby villages and district headquarter (Amreli) and tehsil (Kunkavav) at regular intervals.
- Post Office Branch

== Economy ==
Agriculture is the main driver of the economy here, and the majority of people here are involved in farming. Some people are also into politics, administration, and education. However, the bulk of the village youth have their own businesses in the fields of construction, embroidery, software, etc. Residents of the village are also known to work in Rajkot, Ahmedabad, Surat, and Mumbai.

== Sarpanch ==
Kishorbhai Lunagariya was the former Sarpanch of Bhayavadar. The incumbent Sarpanch is Shirimati Kanchanben Lunagariya, who has constantly been working painstakingly for the development of the village. She is assisted by the council of members of Gram Panchayat and Batukbhai Bhalala, the Deputy Sarpanch of the village.

== History of Leaders in 20th And 21st century ==
Years	Sarpanch	Picture of Development&link
01/06/1955 to 17/01/1958	Bhavanbhai Lavjibhai Gajera (first sarpanch)	
17/01/1958 to 06/04/1958	Vallabhbhai Hirjibhai Sorathiya	
06/04/1958 to 31/08/1958	Punabhai Rudabhai (UpSarpanch) But Charge Of Sarpanch	
31/08/1959 to 25/01/1960	Popatbhai Kurjibhai Sorathiya	
25/01/1960 to 24/08/1962	Punabhai Rudabhia (UpSarpanch) But Charge Of Sarpanch	
24/8/1962 to 04/07/1967	Lavjibhai Kurjibhai Sorathiya	
04/07/1967 to 04/07/1972	Bhavanbhai Jerambhai Padasala	
04/07/1972 to 07/09/1976	Lavjibhai Kurjibhai Sorathiya	
20/01/1983 to 23/8/1988	Lavjibhai Kurjibhai Sorathiya	
11/01/1989 to 11/01/1994	Lakhabahai Popatbhai Sorathiya	
11/01/1994 to 19/07/1995	B.K. Dafda (Vahivatdar Taluka Panchayat Kunkavav Charge)	
19/07/1995 to 19/07/2000	Chanpaben Lakhabhai Sorathiya	
19/07/2000 to 18/01/2002	M.N. Patel (Vahivatdar Taluka Panchayat Kunkavav Charge )	
18/01/2002 to 18/1/2007	Bhupatbhai Wala	
18/01/2007 To 19/01/2012	Kanchanben Kishorbhai Luinagariya	
19/1/2012 to 18/01/2017	Kishorbhai Bachubhai Lunagariya	
18/01/2017 to Present	Kanchanben Kishorbhai Luinagariya	

== Religion ==
The majority of the villagers follow the Hindu religion. Patel, Luhar, Suthar, Harijans, Brahmins are common castes here.

Villagers celebrate festivals like Holi, Diwali, Janmashtami, Rakshabandhan, etc.

The society here adheres to Hindu traditions and rituals, although the young generation has largely been influenced by Western culture.

== Education ==
In the village, Bhayavadar Upper Primary School offers educational facilities to the children. The village doesn't have any high school or college. Therefore, for secondary and higher education, children often go to nearby villages, towns, or cities, including Amreli, Moti Kunkavav, and Bagsara.

The village has an above average literacy rate with almost all children attending school up to at least a primary school level.

While the whole population enjoys above average literacy rates there is still a way to go to bring women's literacy rates up to the national average however this rate is slowly improving.

Many students from the village are known to get admissions in prestigious higher education institutions across India through various competitive examinations like IIT JEE, AIEEE, etc.

== Image Gallery ==
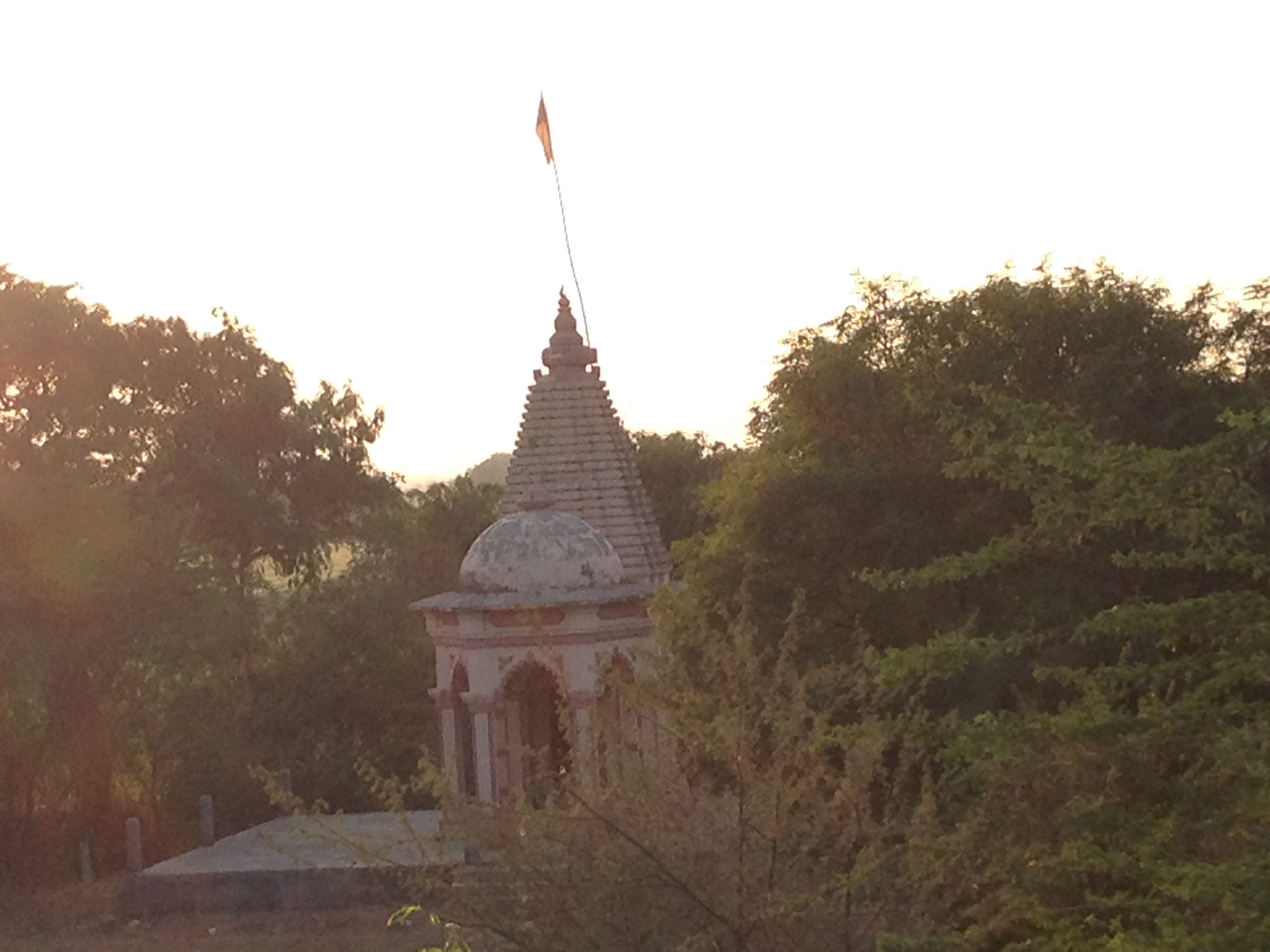
Manjuleshwar Mahadev

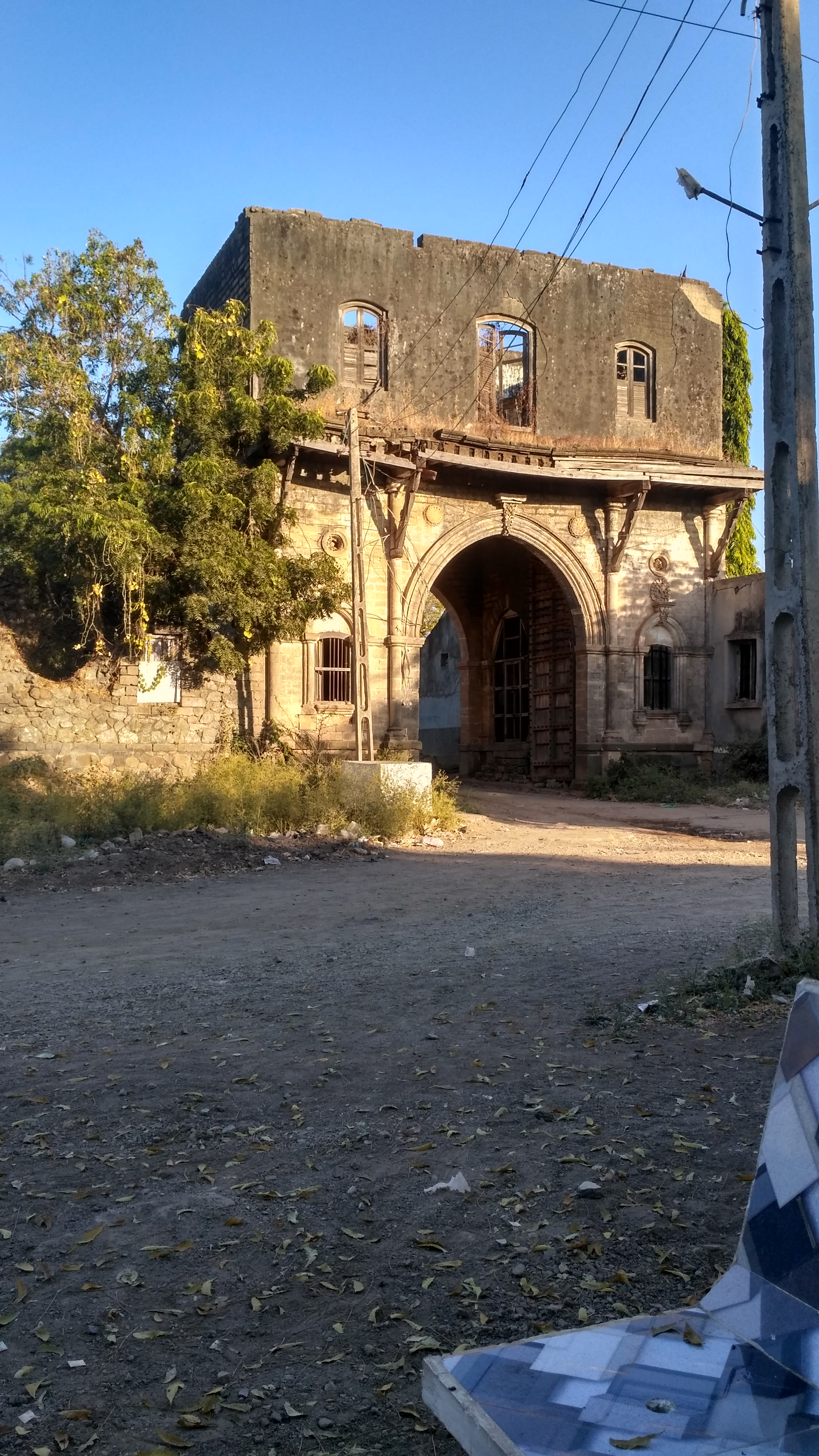
Gateway of Bhayavadar
