= Mithapur railway station =

Railway station in Gujarat, India

General information
- Location: Mithapur, Gujarat; India
- Coordinates: 22°24′45″N 69°00′35″E
- Elevation: 4 metres (13 ft)
- System: Indian Railway Station
- Owner: Ministry of Railways, Indian Railways
- Operator: Western Railway
- Line: Viramgam–Okha line
- Platforms: 1
- Tracks: 1

Construction
- Structure type: Standard (On Ground)
- Parking: No

Other information
- Status: Functioning
- Station code: MTHP
- Zone(s): Western Railway
- Division(s): Rajkot
Location
- Location within India Location within Gujarat

Mithapur railway station is a railway station on the Western Railway network in the state of Gujarat, India. Mithapur railway station is 10 km far away from Okha railway station. Passenger, Express, and Superfast trains halt here.

== Trains ==
The following Express and Superfast trains halt at Mithapur railway station in both directions:

- 19251/52 Okha - Somnath Express
- 22945/46 Okha - Mumbai Central Saurashtra Mail

== See also ==
- Devbhumi Dwarka district
