= Jabalpur–Indore Overnight Express =

Train in India

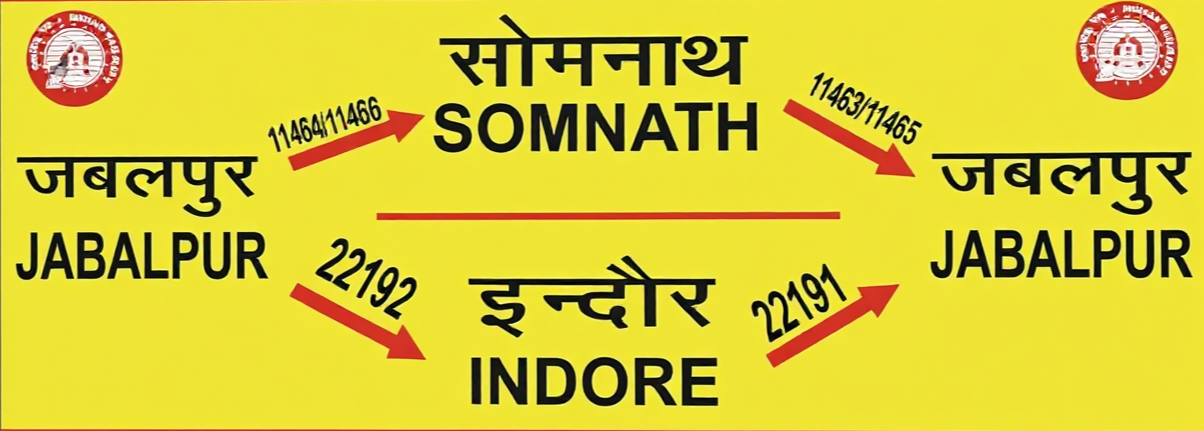
- Jabalpur–Indore Express train board

Overview
- Service type: Superfast
- Locale: Madhya Pradesh
- First service: 3 November 2011; 14 years ago
- Current operator: West Central Railways

Route
- Termini: Jabalpur (JBP); Indore (INDB)
- Stops: 17
- Distance travelled: 554 km (344 mi)
- Average journey time: 10 hrs 5 mins
- Service frequency: Daily
- Train number: 22191 / 22192

On-board services
- Classes: AC First Class, AC 2 Tier, AC 3 Tier, Sleeper class, General Unreserved
- Seating arrangements: Yes
- Sleeping arrangements: Yes
- Catering facilities: On-board catering, E-catering
- Observation facilities: Large windows
- Baggage facilities: Available

Technical
- Rolling stock: LHB coach
- Track gauge: 1,676 mm (5 ft 6 in)
- Operating speed: 55 km/h (34 mph) average with halts
Route map
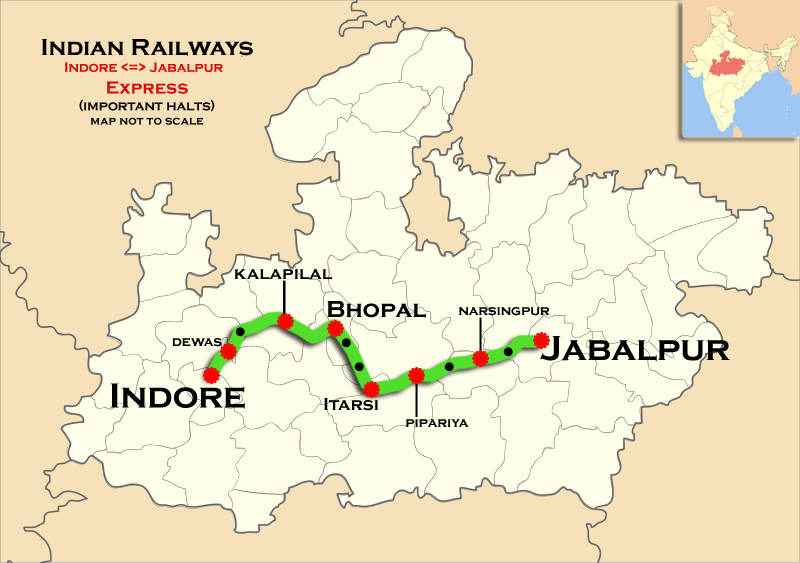

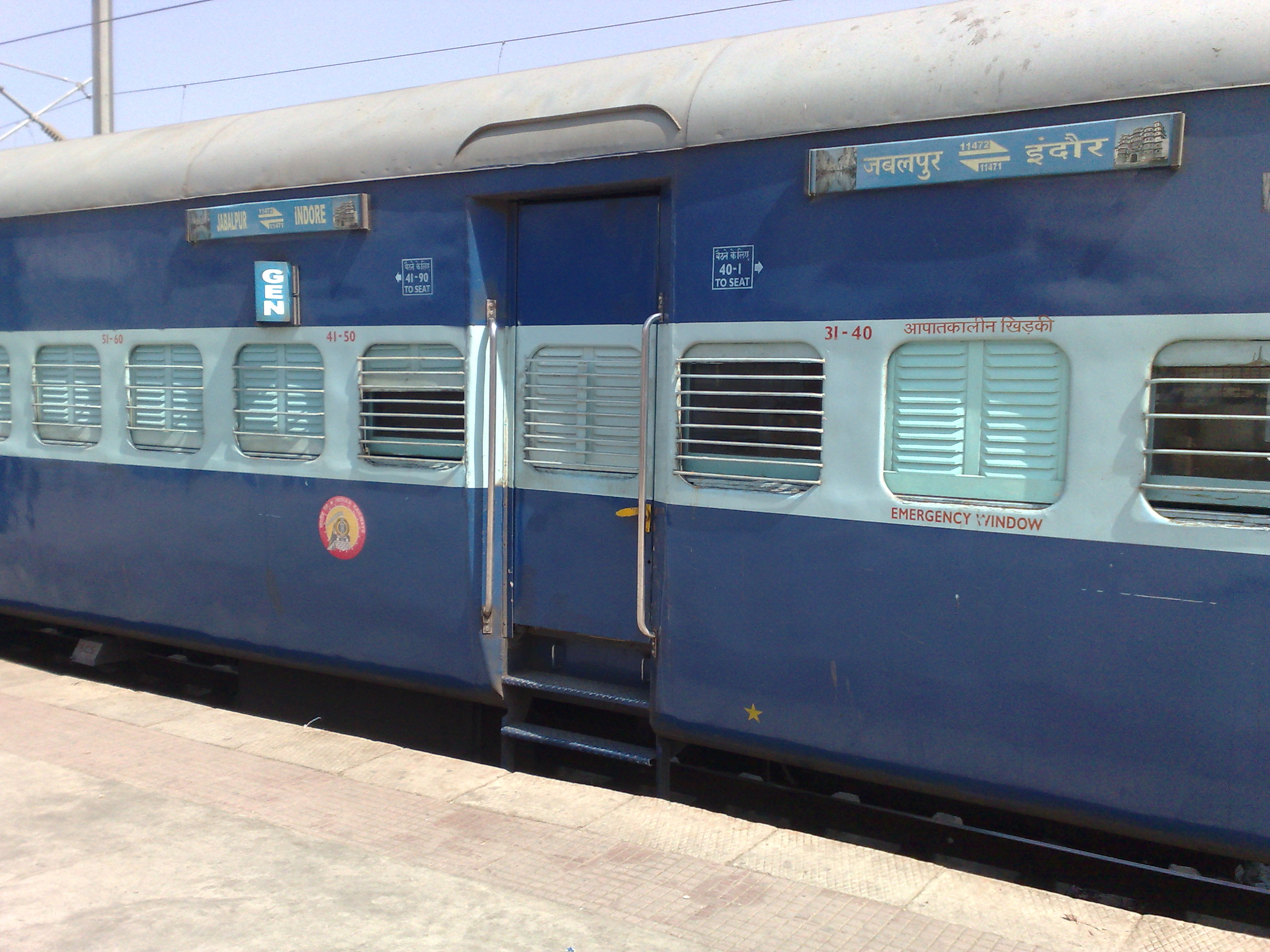
Indore–Jabalpur Overnight Express

The 22191 / 22192 Jabalpur–Indore Overnight Express is a daily Superfast train of the Indian Railways, which runs between Jabalpur Junction railway station of Jabalpur, an important city & military cantonment hub of India, and Indore Junction, the main railway station in Indore, the commercial hub and largest city of the Central India in the state of Madhya Pradesh.

== Coach composition ==
The train consists of 22 LHB coach :

- 1 AC First Class
- 2 AC II Tier
- 6 AC III Tier
- 3 AC III Tier economy
- 5 Sleeper Class
- 3 General Unreserved
- 2 EOG/Generator Car

== Service ==
- 22191/Indore–Jabalpur Overnight Express has an average speed of 55 km/h and covers 555 km in 10 hrs 10 mins.
- 22192/Jabalpur–Indore Overnight Express has an average speed of 55 km/h and covers 555 km in 10 hrs 05 mins.

== Route & halts ==
The important halts of the train are :

- Jabalpur Junction
- Madan Mahal
- Narsinghpur
- Gadarwara
- Pipariya
- Itarsi Junction
- Narmadapuram
- Rani Kamalapati
- Bhopal Junction
- Sant Hirdaram Nagar
- Sehore
- Shujalpur
- Maksi Junction
- Dewas Junction
- Indore Junction

== Schedule ==
Train number	Station code	Departure station	Departure time	Departure day	Arrival station	Arrival time	Arrival day
22191	INDB	Indore Junction	19:30 PM	Daily	Jabalpur Junction	05:35 AM	Daily
22192	JBP	Jabalpur Junction	23:30 PM	Daily	Indore Junction	09:35 AM	Daily

== Rake sharing ==
The train shares its rake with;

- 11463/11464 Somnath–Jabalpur Express (via Itarsi),
- 11465/11466 Somnath–Jabalpur Express (via Bina).

== Direction reversal ==
The train reverses its direction once at;

- Itarsi Junction.

== Traction ==
Both trains are hauled by an Itarsi Loco Shed-based WAP-7 or Tughlakabad Loco Shed-based WAP-7 electric locomotive from end to end.
