= Junagadh Junction railway station =

Railway station in Gujarat, India

Junagadh Junction

General information
- Location: Junagadh, Gujarat; India
- Coordinates: 21°31′45″N 70°27′27″E
- System: Indian Railways station
- Owner: Ministry of Railways, Indian Railways
- Operator: Western Railway
- Lines: Rajkot–Somnath line Veraval–Junagadh section
- Platforms: 3
- Tracks: 5

Construction
- Parking: Yes
- Cycle facilities: Yes

Other information
- Status: Functioning
- Station code: JND
- Zone(s): Western Railway
- Division(s): Bhavnagar

Services
Preceding station	Indian Railways	Following station
Jetalsar Junction towards Navagadh	Western Railway zone Rajkot–Somnath line	Keshod towards Veraval Junction
Route map
Location
- Location within India Location within Gujarat

Junagadh Junction railway station is a railway station in the city of Junagadh, Gujarat. It is under Bhavnagar railway division of Western Railway zone of Indian Railways.

It is located at 86 m (282 ft) above sea level and has five platforms. As of 2016, a single diesel broad-gauge railway line exists at this station; twenty-five trains halt here, two trains originate and two trains terminate here. Keshod Airport is at distance of 39 kilometres (24 mi).

== Trains ==
The following trains halt at Junagadh Junction railway station:

- 19569/70 Rajkot–Veraval Express
- 16333/34 Thiruvananthapuram–Veraval Express
- 11087/88 Veraval–Pune Express
- 19319/20 Veraval–Indore Mahamana Express
- 22957/58 Somnath Superfast Express
- 11465/66 Somnath–Jabalpur Express (via Bina)
- 11463/64 Somnath–Jabalpur Express (via Itarsi)
- 19119/20 Ahmedabad–Somnath Intercity Express
- 19251/52 Somnath–Okha Express
