= Songadh railway station =

Railway station in Gujarat, India

General information
- Location: Songadh, Bhavnagar, Gujarat; India
- Coordinates: 21°43′43″N 71°53′10″E
- Elevation: 38 m (124.7 ft)
- System: Indian Railways station
- Owner: Ministry of Railways, Indian Railways
- Operator: Western Railway
- Lines: Bhavnagar–Surendranagar–Ahmedabad; Bhavnagar–Sihor–Palitana; Bhavnagar–Botad–Dholka–Ahmedabad
- Platforms: 1
- Tracks: 1

Construction
- Parking: No
- Cycle facilities: No

Other information
- Status: Functioning
- Station code: SGD
- Zone(s): Western Railway
- Division(s): Bhavnagar
Location
- Location within India Location within Gujarat

Songadh railway station is a railway station serving in Bhavnagar district of Gujarat state of India. It is under Bhavnagar railway division of Western Railway Zone of Indian Railways. Songadh railway station is 28 km far away from Bhavnagar Terminus. Passenger, Express and Superfast trains halt here.

== Trains ==
The following trains halt at Songadh railway station in both directions:

- 12941/42 Parasnath Express
- 12971/72 Bandra Terminus–Bhavnagar Terminus Express
- 19579/80 Bhavnagar Terminus–Delhi Sarai Rohilla Link Express

== See also ==
- Bhavnagar State Railway
