= Amreli railway station =

Railway station in Gujarat, India

General information
- Location: Amreli, Gujarat; India
- Coordinates: 21°36′32″N 71°13′43″E
- Elevation: 127 m (416.7 ft)
- System: Indian Railways station
- Owner: Ministry of Railways, Indian Railways
- Operator: Western Railway
- Line: Amreli–Veraval line
- Platforms: 1
- Tracks: 1

Construction
- Parking: Yes
- Cycle facilities: Yes

Other information
- Status: Functioning
- Station code: AE
- Zone(s): Western Railway
- Division(s): Bhavnagar

History
- Electrified: Ongoing
Location
- Location within India Location within Gujarat

Amreli railway station is a railway station serving in Amreli district of Gujarat State of India. It is under Bhavnagar railway division of Western Railway Zone of Indian Railways. Passenger trains halt here.

== Major trains ==
- 52929/52930 Amreli–Veraval MG Passenger (unreserved)
- 52933/52946 Amreli–Veraval MG Passenger (unreserved)
- 52955/52956 Amreli–Junagadh MG Passenger (unreserved)
