= Khijadiya, Amreli =

Village in Gujarat state, India

Coordinates: 21.546°N 70.994°E

Khijadiya is a village and railway station in Bagasara Taluka, Amreli District, Gujarat State. Khijadiya is located 31.3 km distance from its district headquarters town of Amreli.

Khijadiya is also a railway junction station and connects to Dhari, Junagadh and Dhasa junctions. The station code is KJV.
