= Jetalsar Junction railway station =

Railway station in Gujarat, India

Jetalsar junction railway station
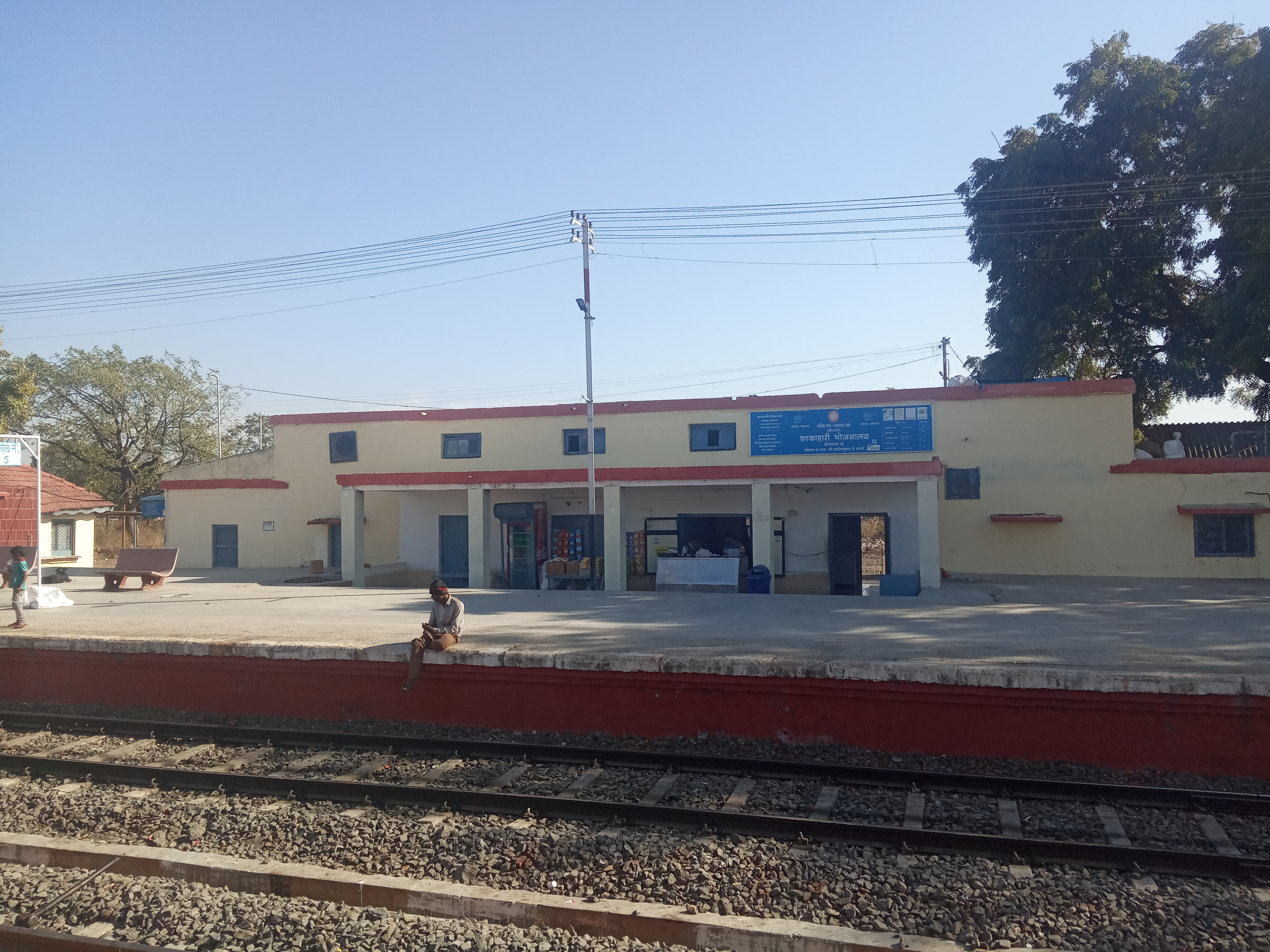
- Jetalsar railway station

General information
- Location: Rajkot, Gujarat; India
- Coordinates: 21°43′45″N 70°34′27″E
- Elevation: 107 metres (351 ft)
- System: Indian Railways station
- Owner: Indian Railways
- Operator: Western Railway
- Lines: Rajkot–Somnath line Porbandar–Jetalsar section
- Platforms: 5
- Tracks: 5

Construction
- Structure type: Standard (on ground)
- Parking: Yes

Other information
- Status: Functioning
- Station code: JLR
- Zone(s): Western Railway
- Division(s): Bhavnagar

History
- Opened: 1890
Location
- Location within India Location within Gujarat

Jetalsar Junction railway station is an important junction railway station under Bhavnagar railway division of Western Railway Zone of Indian Railways.

It connects Rajkot Junction on north direction, Wansjaliya, Porbandar on West direction, Junagadh Junction and Veraval Junction on south direction and Khijadiya Junction, Dhola Junction on East direction.

== Major trains ==
Following trains halt at Jetalsar Junction railway station:

- 19569/70 Rajkot–Veraval Express
- 22957/58 Somnath Superfast Express
- 11465/66 Somnath–Jabalpur Express (via Bina)
- 11463/64 Somnath–Jabalpur Express (via Itarsi)
- 19119/20 Ahmedabad–Somnath Intercity Express
- 19251/52 Somnath–Okha Express
- 19571/52 Rajkot–Porbandar Express
- 12949/50 Kavi Guru Express
