= Somnath railway station =

Railway Station in Gujarat, India

Somnath Terminus
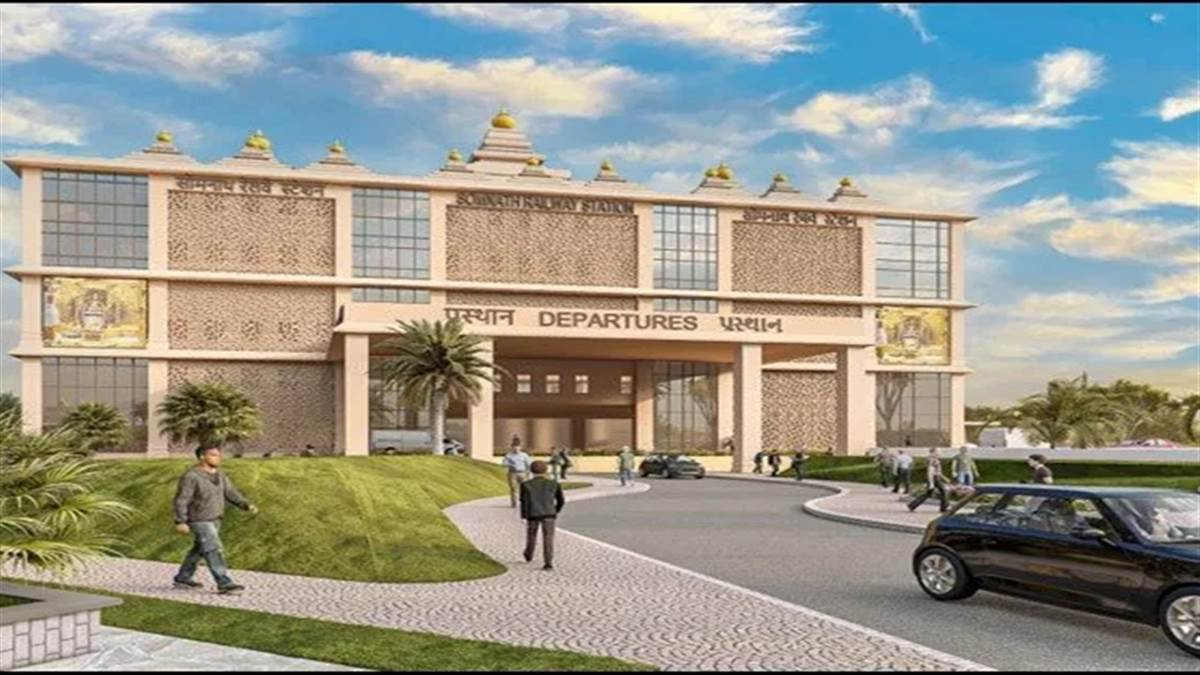
- Somnath Terminus (Proposed)

General information
- Location: Near Shankh Circle, Veraval, Gujarat; India
- Coordinates: 20°53′45″N 70°24′29″E
- Elevation: 12 m (39 ft)
- System: Indian Railways station Terminal Station
- Owner: Indian Railways
- Operator: Western Railway
- Line: Rajkot–Somnath line
- Platforms: 3
- Tracks: 5

Construction
- Structure type: Standard (on ground)
- Parking: Available (UC)
- Cycle facilities: Available (Construction)
- Accessible: Available

Other information
- Status: Under construction
- Station code: SMNH
- Zone(s): Western Railway
- Division(s): Bhavnagar

History
- Opened: October 16, 2008; 18 years ago
- Closed: 22 September 2022 (Temporarily Closed)
- Rebuilt: Under construction
- Electrified: October 22, 2023; 3 years ago

Services
Preceding station	Indian Railways	Following station
Veraval Junction towards Keshod	Western Railway zone	Terminus
Route map
Location
- Location within India Location within Gujarat
- Interactive Map

Somnath Terminus (station code: SMNH) is a terminal railway station in the city of Veraval, Gujarat. It is under Bhavnagar railway division of Western Railway zone of Indian Railways. The Somnath temple is 1.4 kilometres (1 mi) away from this railway station.

== History ==
The foundation stone for this station was laid by Deputy Prime Minister L.K. Advani in 2002, reflecting political support for direct temple connectivity. The official opening took place on October 16, 2008. Lalu Prasad Yadav formally inaugurated the line and launched the 1463/1464 Veraval–Jabalpur Express, marking direct rail access to the Somnath temple precincts and shifting some shrine-bound traffic directly off Veraval Junction. As of September 2022, the station was temporarily closed for redevelopment. The Western Railway's Gati Shakti unit is transforming it into a modern, temple-inspired terminal, featuring 12 shikhars echoing the Somnath temple’s architecture.

== Trains ==
A daily train to Jabalpur Junction, Ahmedabad Junction, Rajkot Junction and Okha runs from here. But due to construction of new station the trains have been shortly terminated to Veraval Junction, city's main railway station.

== See also ==
- Veraval Junction railway station
- Dwarka railway station
