= Surendranagar Junction railway station =

Railway station in Gujarat, India

General information
- Location: Surendranagar, Gujarat; India
- Coordinates: 22°44′39″N 71°37′44″E
- Elevation: 72 m (236 ft)
- System: Indian Railways station
- Owner: Indian Railways
- Operator: Western Railway
- Lines: Viramgam–Okha line Dharangadhra–Surendra Nagar section Surendranagar–Bhavnagar line
- Platforms: 6
- Tracks: 11

Construction
- Structure type: Standard (on-ground station)
- Parking: Yes

Other information
- Status: Functioning
- Station code: SUNR
- Zone(s): Western Railway
- Division(s): Rajkot

History
- Opened: 1872
- Former names: Morvi State Railway
Location
- Location within India Location within Gujarat

Surendranagar Junction railway station belongs to Western Railway of Rajkot Division. It is located in Surendranagar district of Gujarat state.

== History ==
Sir Lakhdhiraji Waghji, who ruled from 1922 until 1948, acted as a ruler, manager, patron and policeman of the state with great authority. Sir Waghji, like other contemporary rulers of Saurashtra, built roads and a railway network (of seventy miles), connecting Wadhwan and Morbi. Surendranagar–Rajkot section was laid in 1905. Gauge conversion of Viramgam–Hapa section via Surendranagar, Wankaner was completed by 1980. Morvi State Railway was merged into the Western Railway on 5 November 1951.

== Passenger amenities ==
About 108 passenger trains arrive at this station. There were trains Mumbai, Ahmedabad, Delhi, Visakhapatnam, Secunderabad, Nagpur, Howrah, Kamakhya, Rajkot, Gandhidham, Wankaner etc.,
