= Rajkot railway division =

Railway division in Western railway zone, India

Rajkot railway division is one of the six railway divisions under the jurisdiction of Western Railway zone of the Indian Railways. This railway division was formed on 5 November 1951 and its headquarters is located at Rajkot, in the state of Gujarat of India.

Mumbai WR railway division, Ahmedabad railway division, Bhavnagar railway division, Vadodara railway division and Ratlam railway division are the other five railway divisions under WR Zone headquartered at Churchgate, Mumbai.

== List of railway stations and towns ==
The list includes the stations under the Rajkot railway division and their station category.

Category of station	No. of stations	Names of stations
A-1	1	Rajkot Junction
A	2	Jamnagar, Surendranagar Junction
B	2	Dwarka, Okha
C suburban station	1	Bhaktinagar
D	-	-
E	-	-
F halt station	-	-
Total	-	-
