= Thiruvananthapuram–Veraval Express =

Train service in India

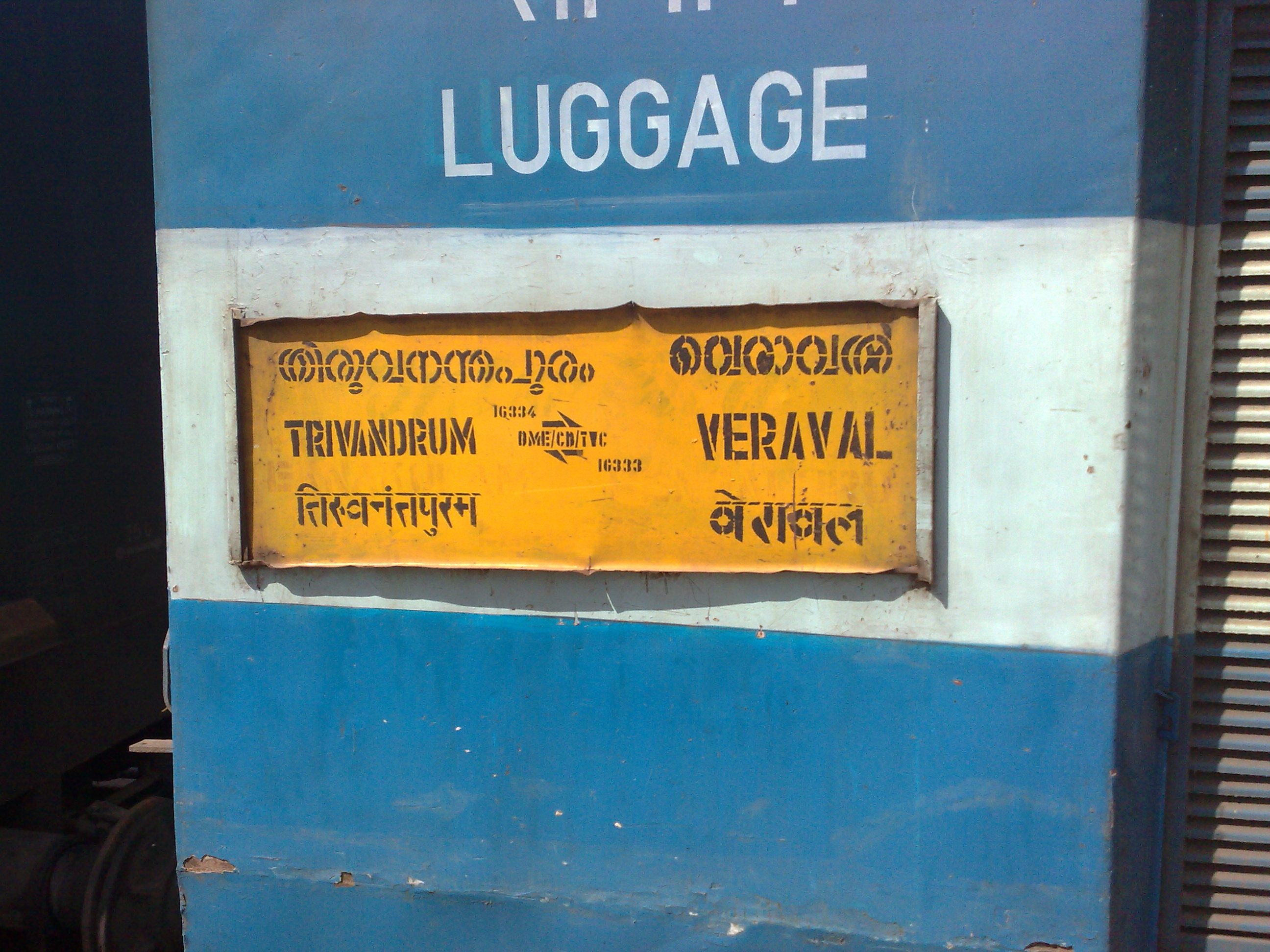

Overview
- Service type: Express
- First service: 26 January 1984; 42 years ago
- Current operator: Southern Railways

Route
- Termini: Thiruvananthapuram Central (TVC); Veraval Junction (VRL)
- Stops: 57
- Distance travelled: 2,709 km (1,683 mi)
- Average journey time: 49 hours 00 minutes as 16334 Thiruvananthapuram Central–Veraval Junction Express, 46 hours 40 minutes as 16333 Veraval Junction–Thiruvananthapuram Central Express.
- Service frequency: Weekly. 16334 Thiruvananthapuram Central–Veraval Junction Express – Monday. 16333 Veraval Junction–Thiruvananthapuram Central Express – Thursday.
- Train number: 16333 / 16334

On-board services
- Classes: AC 2 tier, AC 3 tier, Sleeper class, Unreserved/General
- Seating arrangements: Yes
- Sleeping arrangements: Yes
- Catering facilities: Pantry car attached

Technical
- Rolling stock: LHB coach
- Track gauge: 1,676 mm (5 ft 6 in)
- Operating speed: 110 km/h (68 mph) maximum 56.67 km/h (35 mph), including halts

The 16333/34 Thiruvananthapuram–Veraval Express is an Express train belonging to Indian Railways – Southern Railway zone that runs between Thiruvananthapuram Central and Veraval Junction in India.

It operates as train number 16333 from Veraval Junction to Thiruvananthapuram Central and as train number 16334 in the reverse direction, serving the states of Kerala, Karnataka, Goa, Maharashtra & Gujarat.

Originally the train began operations in 1984 as Ahmedabad–Trivandrum Express which later on was extended to Rajkot as Trivandrum–Rajkot Express. Now this train has been extended up to Veraval. Since 25 July, this train runs with LHB coach.

== Coach composition ==
The train has LHB coach with max speed of 130 km/h (81 mph). The train consists of 22 coaches:

- 2 AC 2 tier
- 7 AC 3 tier
- 6 Sleeper class
- 1 Pantry car
- 4 Unreserved/General
- 2 Seating cum Luggage Rake

As with most train services in India, coach composition may be amended at the discretion of Indian Railways depending on demand.

== Service ==
- 16333/Veraval–Thiruvananthapuram Express has average speed of 58.05 km/h (36 mph) and covers 2,709 km (1,683 mi) in 46 hrs 40 mins.
- 16334/Thiruvananthapuram–Veraval Express has average speed of 55.29 km/h (34 mph) and covers 2,709 km (1,683 mi) in 49 hrs 00 mins.

Despite the average speed of the train being higher than 55 km/h (34 mph), as per railway rules, its fare doesn't includes a Superfast surcharge.

== Routes ==
Originally as Trivandrum Rajkot Express train ran on routes via Palakkad–Krishnarajapuram–Guntakal–Solapur–Pune–Vasai–Vadodara. In the early 1990s with opening the Konkan Railway the train routes were changed. Now the 16333/34 Thiruvananthapuram–Veraval Express runs from Thiruvananthapuram Central via Kollam Junction, Tiruvalla, Kottayam, Ernakulam Town, Shoranur Junction, Mangalore Junction, Madgaon Junction, Ratnagiri, Panvel, Vasai Road,Valsad, Navsari, Surat, Vadodara Junction, Ahmedabad Junction, Rajkot Junction, Junagadh Junction to Veraval Junction and vice versa.

== Rake sharing ==
The train shares its rake with 12697/12698 Chennai–Thiruvananthapuram Superfast Express.

== Traction ==
Both trains are hauled by an Electric Loco Shed, Erode-based WAP-4 or WAP-7 from Thiruvananthapuram Central to Veraval Junction and vice versa.
