= Somnath–Jabalpur Express (via Bina) =

Train in India

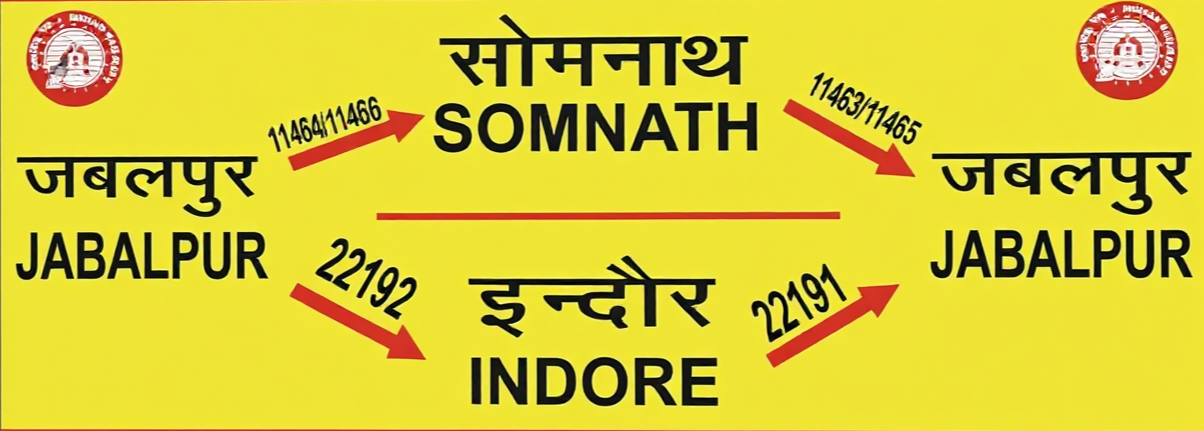
- Jabalpur - Somnath Express train board.

Overview
- Service type: Express
- Locale: Madhya Pradesh & Gujarat
- Current operator: West Central Railways

Route
- Termini: Jabalpur Junction (JBP); Somnath (SMNH)
- Stops: 33
- Distance travelled: 1,569 km (975 mi)
- Average journey time: 29 hours 15 minutes
- Service frequency: Bi-weekly. (Note: Runs two days in a week for every direction.)
- Train number: 11465 / 11466

On-board services
- Classes: AC First Class, AC 2 Tier, AC 3 Tier, Sleeper Class, General Unreserved
- Seating arrangements: Yes
- Sleeping arrangements: Yes
- Catering facilities: On-board catering, E-catering
- Observation facilities: Rake sharing with 11463/11464 Somnath–Jabalpur Express (via Itarsi)
- Baggage facilities: No
- Other facilities: Below the seats

Technical
- Rolling stock: LHB coach
- Track gauge: 1,676 mm (5 ft 6 in)
- Operating speed: 48 km/h (30 mph) average including halts.
Route map
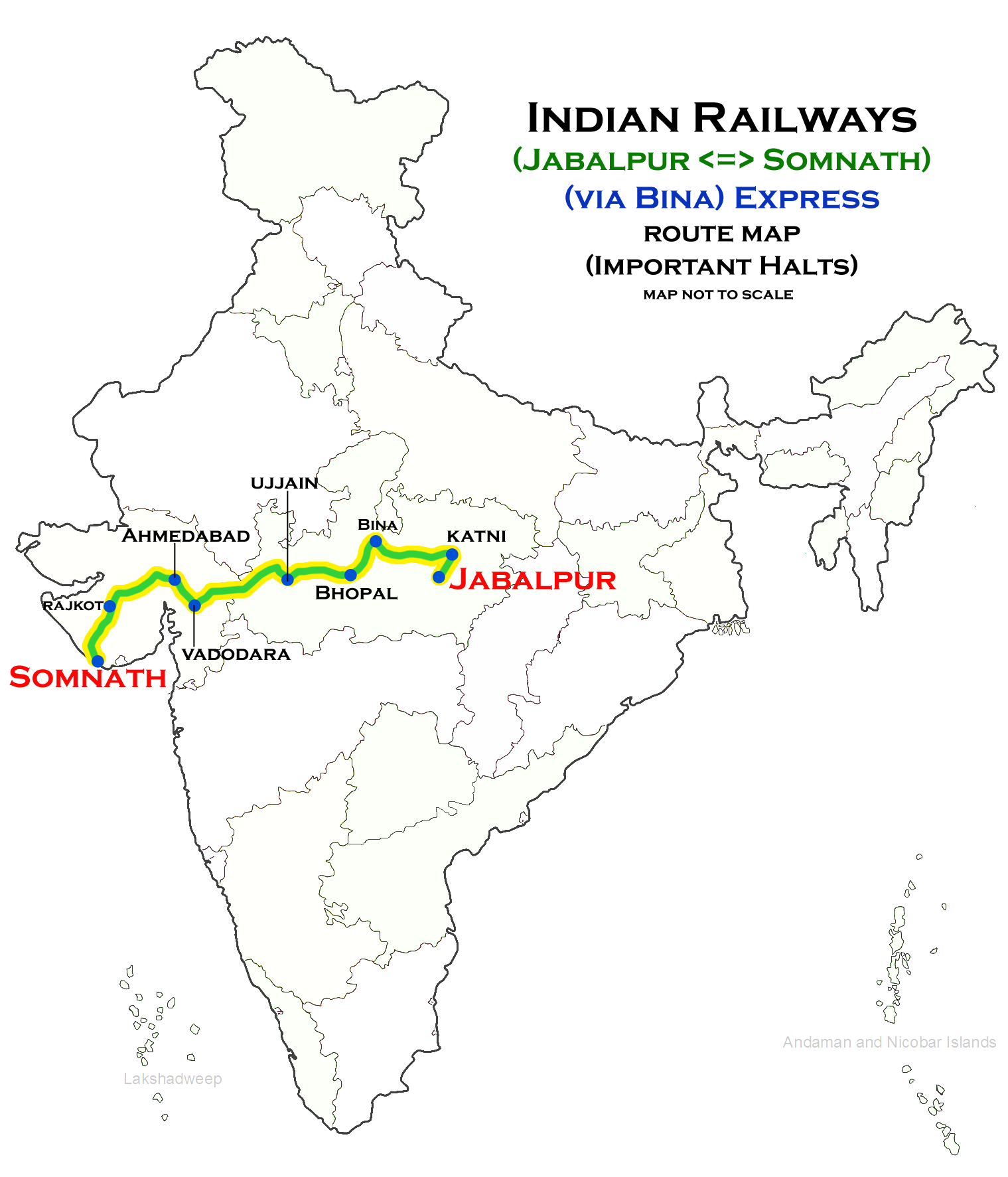

The 11465 / 11466 Somnath–Jabalpur Junction Express (via Bina) is an express train belonging to Indian Railways that runs between Somnath and Jabalpur Junction in India.

== Service ==
The 11466 Jabalpur Junction–Somnath Express covers the distance of 1570 kilometres in 29 hours 15 mins (47.58 km/h) and in 30 hours 30 mins as 11465 Somnath–Jabalpur Junction Express (47.70 km/h).

== Route & halts ==
The important halts of the train are:

- Somnath
- Veraval Junction
- Jetalsar Junction
- Rajkot Junction
- Wankaner Junction
- Viramgam Junction
- Ahmedabad Junction
- Nadiad Junction
- Chhayapuri (Vadodara)
- Godhra Junction
- Ratlam Junction
- Khachrod
- Nagda Junction
- Ujjain Junction
- Bhopal Junction
- Bina Junction
- Saugor
- Damoh
- Katni Murwara Junction
- Jabalpur Junction

== Coach composition ==
The train has highly refurbished LHB rakes with max speed of 110 kmph. The train consists of 22 coaches:

- 1 AC First-class
- 2 AC II Tier
- 6 AC III Tier
- 2 AC III Tier economy
- 6 Sleeper coaches
- 3 General
- 2 EOG/Generator Car

== Traction ==
The train is hauled by an Itarsi Loco Shed-based WAP-7 electric locomotive from Jabalpur Junction to Somnath and vice versa.

== Direction reversal ==
The train reverses its direction once at:

- Bhopal Junction.

== Rake sharing ==
The train shares its rake with;

- 11463/11464 Somnath–Jabalpur Express (via Itarsi),
- 22191/22192 Jabalpur–Indore Overnight Express.

== Timings ==
- 11465 Somnath–Jabalpur Junction Express leaves Somnath every Monday & Saturday at 09:55 hrs IST and reaches Jabalpur Junction at 16:25 hrs IST the next day.
- 11466 Jabalpur Junction–Somnath Express leaves Jabalpur Junction every Monday & Saturday at 12:40 hrs IST and reaches Somnath at 17:55 hrs IST the next day.

== See also ==
- Somnath–Jabalpur Express (via Itarsi)
- Jabalpur–Indore Overnight Express
- Somnath railway station
- Jabalpur Junction railway station
