= Somnath–Jabalpur Express (via Itarsi) =

Train in India

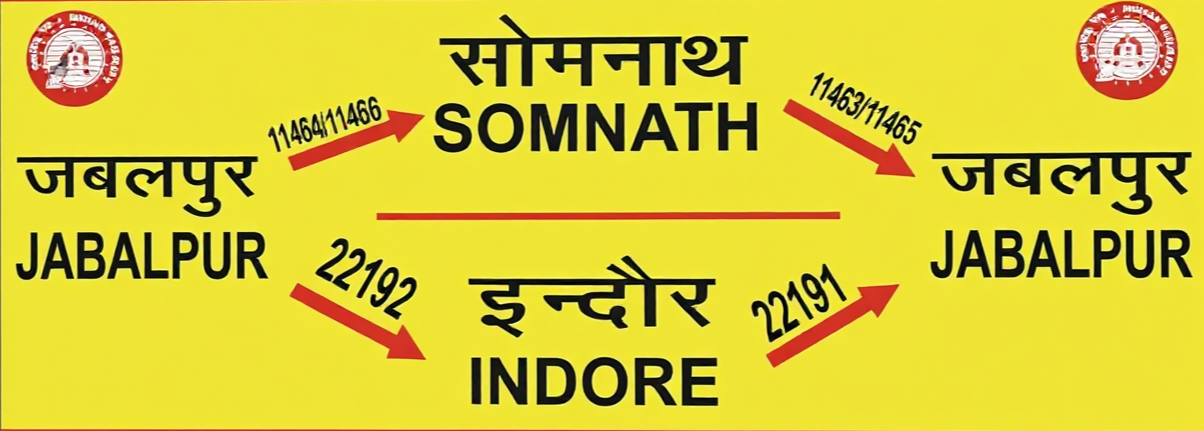
- Jabalpur - Somnath Express train board.

Overview
- Service type: Express
- Locale: Madhya Pradesh & Gujarat
- Current operator: West Central Railways

Route
- Termini: Jabalpur Junction (JBP); Somnath (SMNH)
- Stops: 34
- Distance travelled: 1,402 km (871 mi)
- Average journey time: 27 hours 55 minutes
- Service frequency: 5 days a week
- Train number: 11463 / 11464

On-board services
- Classes: AC First Class, AC 2 Tier, AC 3 Tier, Sleeper Class, General Unreserved
- Seating arrangements: Yes
- Sleeping arrangements: Yes
- Catering facilities: On-board catering, E-catering
- Observation facilities: Rake sharing with 11465/11466 Somnath–Jabalpur Express (via Bina)
- Baggage facilities: No
- Other facilities: Below the seats

Technical
- Rolling stock: LHB coach
- Track gauge: 1,676 mm (5 ft 6 in)
- Operating speed: 50 km/h (31 mph) average including halts.
Route map
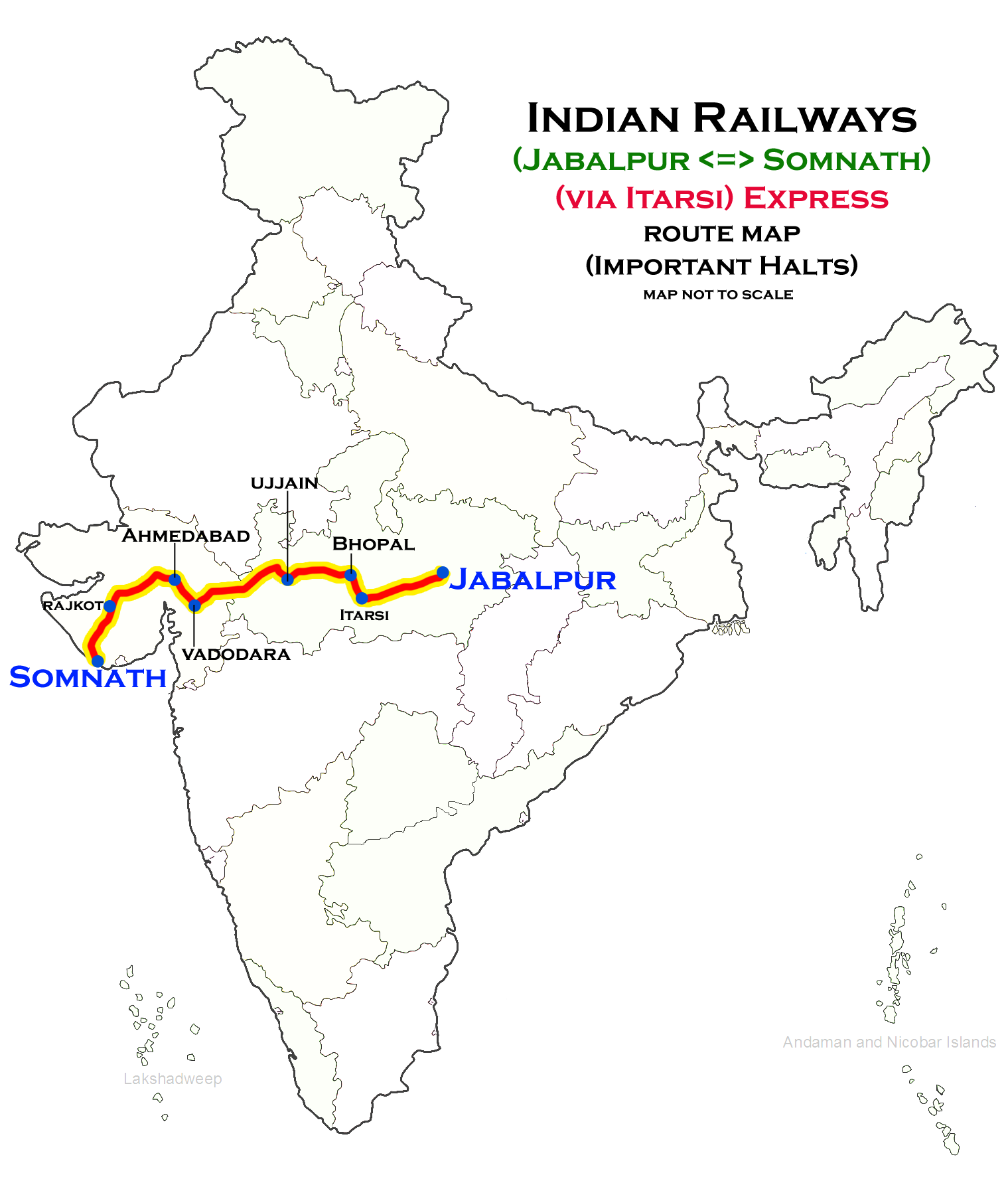

The 11463 / 11464 Somnath–Jabalpur Express (via Itarsi) is an express train belonging to Indian Railways – West Central Railway zone that runs between Somnath and Jabalpur Junction in India.

It operates as train number 11463 from Somnath to Jabalpur Junction and as train number 11464 in the reverse direction, serving the states of Gujarat & Madhya Pradesh.

== Coach composition ==
The train has highly refurbished LHB rakes with max speed of 110 kmph. The train consists of 22 coaches:

- 1 AC First-class
- 2 AC II Tier
- 6 AC III Tier
- 2 AC III Tier economy
- 6 Sleeper coaches
- 3 General
- 2 EOG/Generator Car

It does not have a pantry car.

As is customary with most train services in India, coach composition may be amended at the discretion of Indian Railways depending on demand.

== Service ==
The 11464 Jabalpur Junction–Somnath Express via Itarsi Junction covers the distance of 1402 kilometres in 27 hours 55 mins (50 km/h) & in 27 hours 35 mins as 11463 Somnath–Jabalpur Junction Express (51 km/h).

As the average speed of the train is below 55 km/h, as per Indian Railways rules, its fare does not include a Superfast surcharge.

== Routeing ==
The 11463/11464 Jabalpur Junction–Somnath Express runs from Jabalpur Junction via Narsinghpur, Gadarwara, Pipariya, Itarsi Junction, Narmadapuram, Bhopal Junction, Sehore, Shujalpur, Ujjain Junction, Nagda Junction, Khachrod, Ratlam Junction, Godhra Junction, Chhayapuri, Nadiad Junction, Ahmedabad Junction, Viramgam Junction, Wankaner Junction, Rajkot Junction, Jetalsar Junction, Veraval Junction to Somnath.

== Traction ==
It is hauled by an Itarsi Loco Shed-based WAP-7 electric locomotive from Jabalpur Junction to Somnath, and vice versa.

== Timings ==
- 11463 Somnath–Jabalpur Junction Express leaves Somnath every day except Monday & Saturday at 09:55 hrs IST and reaches Jabalpur Junction at 13:25 hrs IST the next day.
- 11464 Jabalpur Junction–Somnath Express leaves Jabalpur Junction every day except Monday & Saturday at 14:00 hrs IST and reaches Somnath at 17:55 hrs IST the next day.

== Direction reversal ==
The train reverses its direction once at:

- Itarsi Junction.

== Rake sharing ==
The train shares its rake with;

- 11465/11466 Somnath–Jabalpur Express (via Bina),
- 22191/22192 Jabalpur–Indore Overnight Express.

== See also ==
- Somnath–Jabalpur Express (via Bina)
- Jabalpur–Indore Overnight Express
- Somnath railway station
- Jabalpur Junction railway station
