= Ahmedabad–Somnath Intercity Express =

Ahmedabad - Somnath Intercity Express
Overview
- Service type: Express
- Current operator: Western Railway zone

Route
- Termini: Gandhinagar Capital; Somnath
- Stops: 17
- Distance travelled: 437 km (272 mi)
- Average journey time: 9 hours 22 mins
- Service frequency: daily
- Train number: 19119 / 19120

On-board services
- Classes: general unreserved AC Chair car
- Seating arrangements: Yes
- Sleeping arrangements: Yes
- Catering facilities: No

Technical
- Rolling stock: Standard Indian Railways Coaches
- Track gauge: 1,676 mm (5 ft 6 in)
- Operating speed: 46.5 km/h (29 mph)
Route map
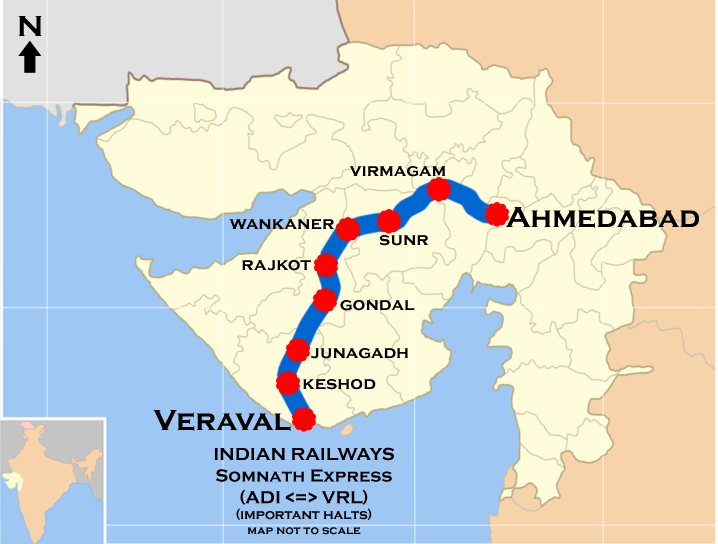

The 19119 / 20 Ahmedabad - Somnath Intercity Express is an Express train belonging to Indian Railways Western Railway zone that runs between Gandhinagar Capital and Veraval Junction in India.

It operates as train number 19119 from Ahmedabad Junction to Veraval Junction and as train number 19120 in the reverse direction serving the states of Gujarat.

== Coaches ==
The 19119 / 20 Intercity Express has six general unreserved & two SLR (seating with luggage rake) coaches . It does not carry a pantry car coach.

As is customary with most train services in India, coach composition may be amended at the discretion of Indian Railways depending on demand.

== Service ==
The 19119 Ahmedabad Junction - Somnath Intercity Express covers the distance of 437 km (272 mi) in 9 hours 20 mins (47 km/h) and in 9 hours 25 mins as the 19120 Somnath - Ahmedabad Junction Intercity Express (46 km/h).

As the average speed of the train is lower than 55 km/h (34 mph), as per railway rules, its fare doesn't includes a Superfast surcharge.

== Routing ==
The 19119 / 20 Intercity Express runs from Ahmedabad Junction via Viramgam, Rajkot Junction, Jetalsar to Somnath.

== Traction ==
As the route is fully electrified, a Vatva based WAP-4 electric locomotive pulls the train to its destination.
