= Veraval Junction railway station =

Railway Station in Gujarat, India

Veraval Junction
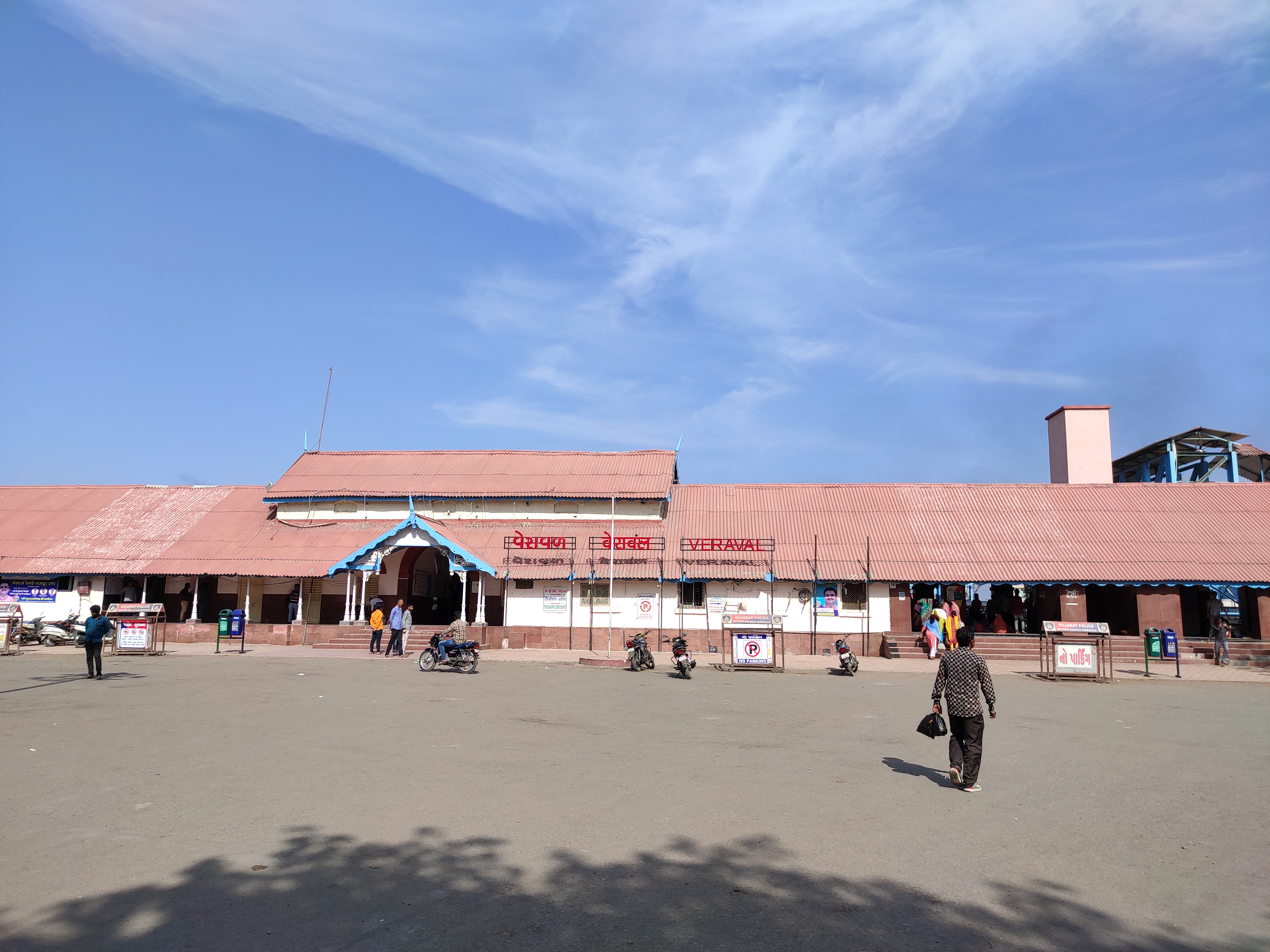
- Veraval Junction

General information
- Location: Junction Road, Veraval, Gujarat; India
- Coordinates: 20°54′45″N 70°22′15″E
- Elevation: 7 m (23 ft)
- System: Indian Railways station
- Owner: Ministry of Railways, Indian Railways
- Operator: Western Railway
- Lines: Rajkot–Somnath line Amreli–Veraval line Veraval–Delvada section
- Platforms: 5
- Tracks: 5

Construction
- Structure type: Standard (on ground)
- Parking: Available
- Accessible: Available

Other information
- Status: Functioning
- Station code: VRL
- Zone(s): Western Railway
- Division(s): Bhavnagar

History
- Opened: 1897; 129 years ago
- Electrified: October 22, 2023; 2 years ago
- Former names: Junagadh & Veraval Railway
Location
- Location within India Location within Gujarat
- Interactive Map

Veraval Junction railway station (station code: VRL) is a railway station in the city of Veraval, Gujarat. It is under Bhavnagar railway division of Western Railway Zone of Indian Railways. It is one of the major railway stations in Saurashtra. Veraval Junction is "A" category station of Bhavnagar railway division of Western Railway zone.

It is located at 7 m above sea level and has five platforms. As of 2024, a single electric broad-gauge railway line and a single diesel meter-gauge line exists. Fourteen trains terminate & originate, at this station. Diu Airport is 73 km away.

== History ==
In the late 1800s, Gujarat’s princely states—Junagadh, Gondal, Bhavnagar, Morvi, etc.—built metre‑gauge networks to connect towns economically. These were small‑scale, cost‑effective lines built to meet modest traffic.

Finally, Junagadh State Railway (also Junagadh & Veraval Railway) inaugurated the Junagadh–Veraval metre‑gauge link in 1888–89. Around the same time, the Rajkot–Jetalsar Railway was launching its Rajkot–Jetalsar stretch (also metre gauge), which linked with the Junagadh–Veraval section, fully connecting Rajkot to Veraval by 1890. Collectively, this interlocking network, built by princely railways, integrated into the Rajkot–Junagadh–Veraval trunk line, establishing Veraval as a vital junction for town's pilgrim-bound passengers and freight heading to the coast and beyond.

In April 1948, these princely metre‑gauge lines merged into Saurashtra Railway, and by November 1951, were absorbed into Western Railway. Decades later, recognizing the need for standardized, higher‑capacity tracks, the Rajkot–Veraval metre gauge was converted between 1996–2003, culminating in full broad-gauge connectivity by 2003.

== Major trains ==
The following trains start from Veraval Junction railway station:

Train no.	Train name	Destination
26901/02	Sabarmati–Veraval Vande Bharat Express	Sabarmati Junction
19319/20	Veraval–Indore Mahamana Express	Indore Junction
16333/34	Thiruvananthapuram Veraval Express	Thiruvananthapuram Central
19217/18	Saurashtra Janta Express	Bandra Terminus
12945/46	Veraval–Banaras Superfast Express	Banaras
11087/88	Veraval–Pune Express	Pune Junction
22957/58	Somnath Superfast Express	Gandhinagar Capital
19203/04	Bandra Terminus–Veraval Weekly Superfast Express	Bandra Terminus
11463/64	Somnath–Jabalpur Express (via Itarsi)	Jabalpur Junction
11465/66	Somnath–Jabalpur Express (via Bina)	Jabalpur Junction
19251/52	Somnath–Okha Express	Okha
19119/20	Ahmedabad–Somnath Intercity Express	Gandhinagar Capital
59558/59	Veraval−Bhavnagar Passenger	Bhavnagar Terminus
59421/22	Rajkot–Veraval Passenger	Rajkot Junction
59423/24	Rajkot–Veraval Passenger	Rajkot Junction

== Gallery ==
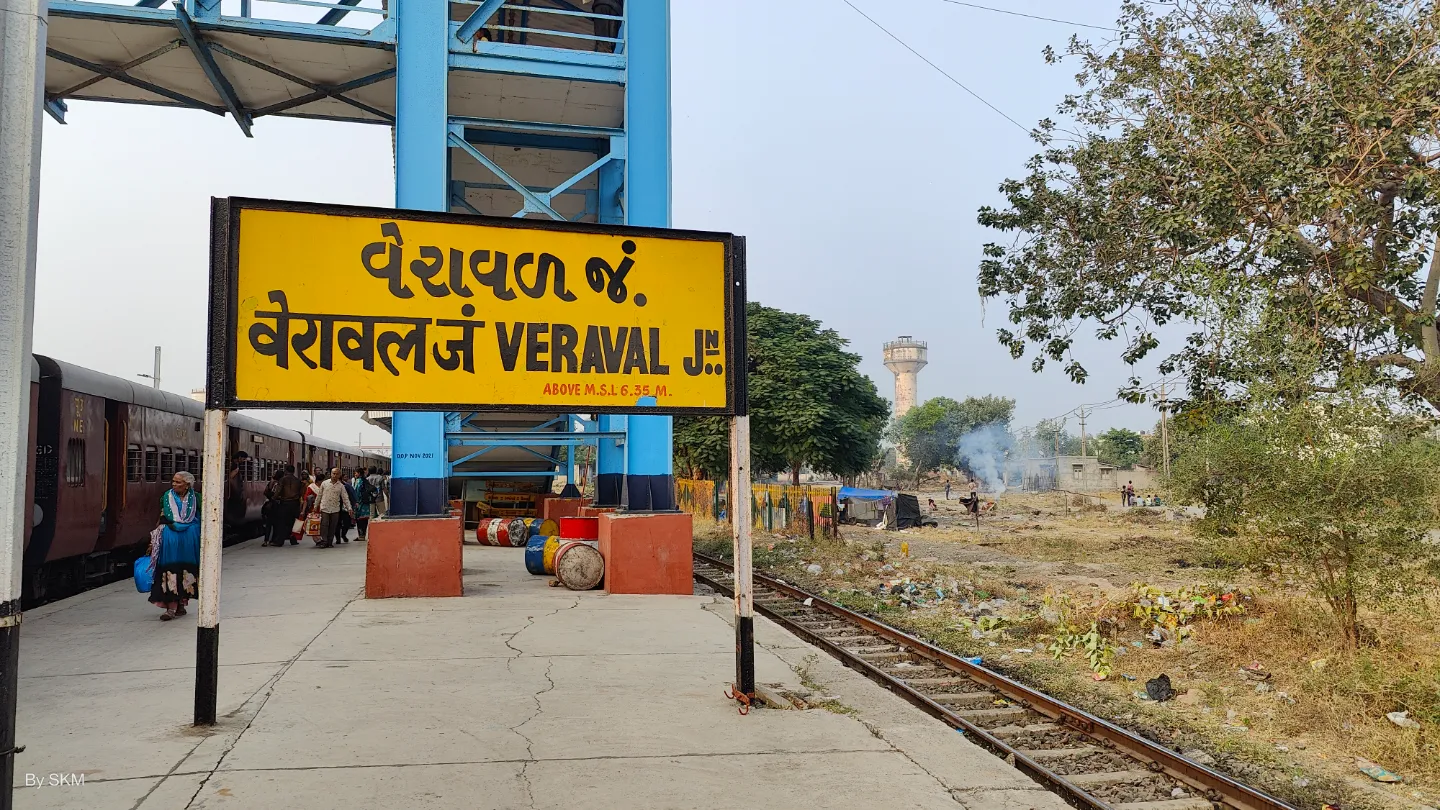
Station Board

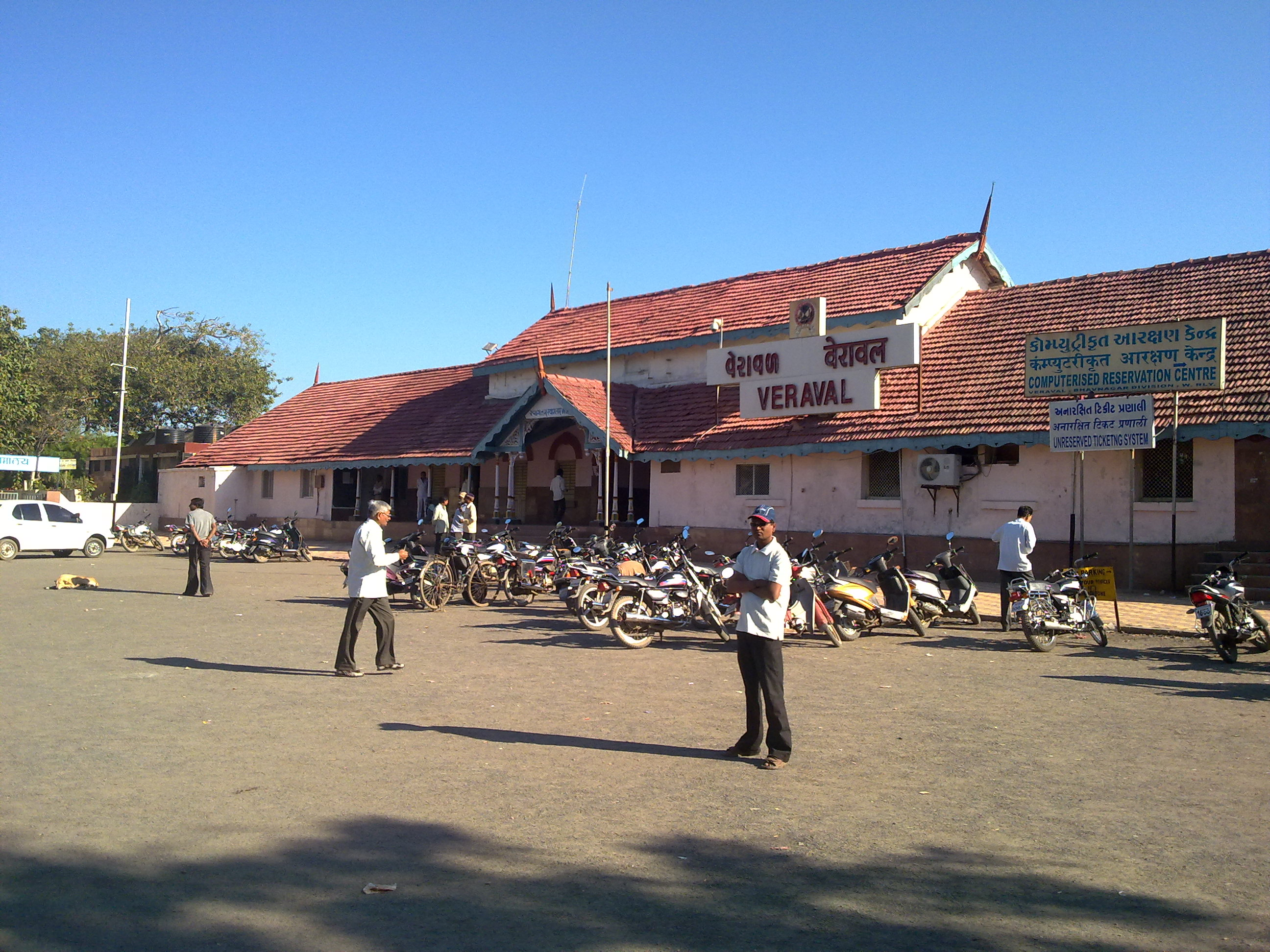
Station in 2010

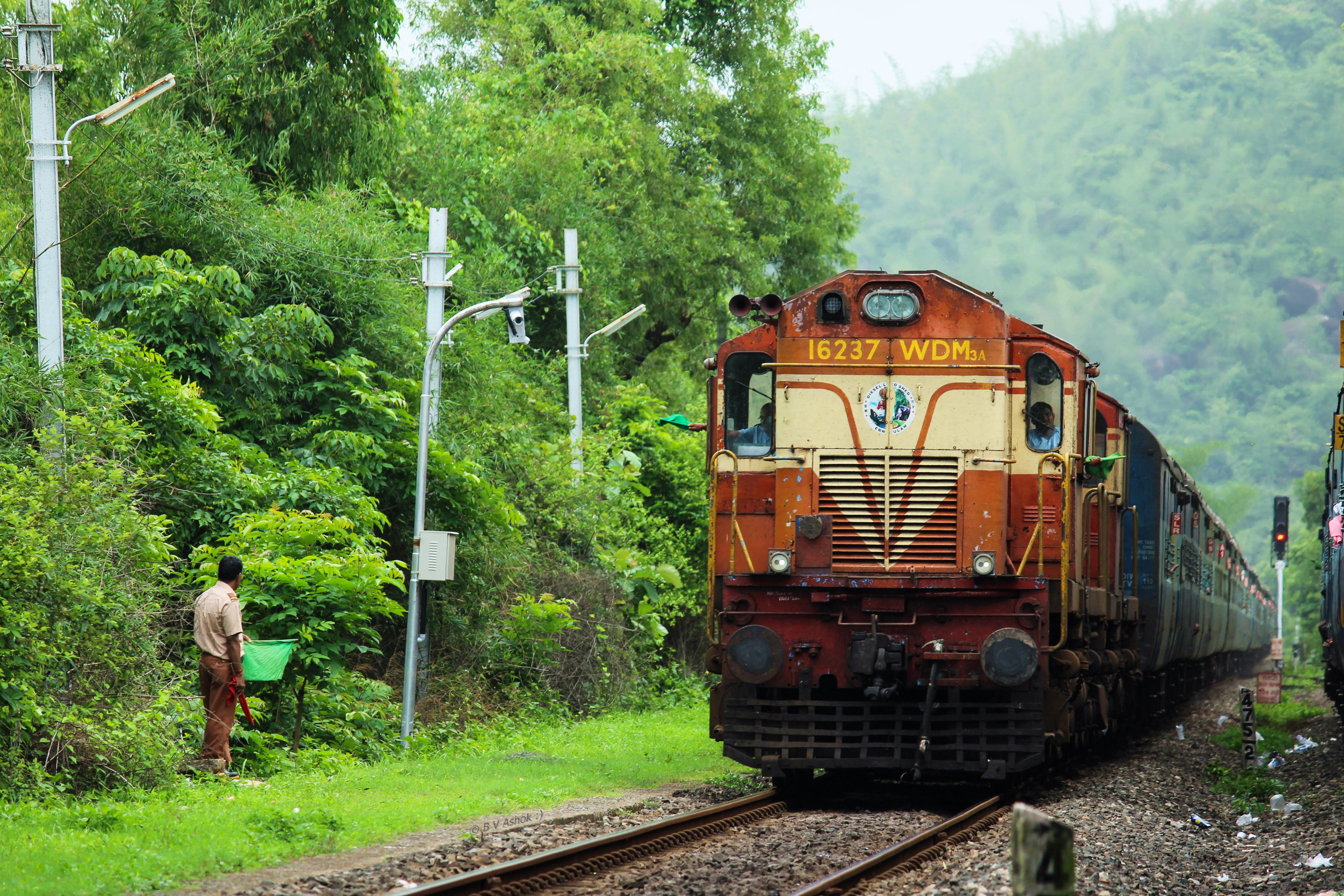
Thiruvananthapuram Central–Veraval Express

== See also ==
- Junagadh State Railway
- Jamnagar & Dwarka Railway
- Somnath Terminus
