= Bhavnagar railway division =

Railway division in Western Railway zone, India

Bhavnagar Railway Division

Overview
- Owner: Western Railway zone
- Locale: Bhavnagar, Gujarat, India
- Stations: 141

Service
- Type: Railway division
- System: Indian Railways

History
- Opened: 5 November 1951; 75 years ago

Bhavnagar railway division is one of the six railway divisions under the jurisdiction of the Western Railway zone of Indian Railways. This railway division was formed on 5 November 1951, and its headquarters is located at Bhavnagar in the Indian state of Gujarat.

Mumbai WR railway division, Ahmedabad railway division, Vadodara railway division, Rajkot railway division, and Ratlam railway division are the other five railway divisions under the Western Railway zone, headquartered at Churchgate, Mumbai.

== List of railway stations and towns ==
The list includes the stations under the Bhavnagar railway division and their station category.

Category of station	No. of stations	Names of stations
A-1 Category	0	-
A Category	2	Bhavnagar Terminus, Veraval Junction
B Category	4	Botad Junction, Gondal, Junagadh Junction, Porbandar, Somnath
C Category (Suburban station)	0	-
D Category	14	Bhavnagar Para, Dhandhuka, Dhola Junction, Keshod, Savarkundla, Sihor Junction, Bhanvad, Jetalsar Junction, Limbdi, Mahuva Junction, Maliya Hatina, Songadh, Amreli
E Category	70	Sasan Gir
F Category; Halt Station	51	-
Total	141	-
