= Somnath Superfast Express =

Train in India

Overview
- Service type: Superfast
- Locale: Gujarat
- Current operator: Western Railway

Route
- Termini: Gandhinagar Capital (GNC); Veraval Junction (VRL)
- Stops: 15
- Distance travelled: 443 km (275 mi)
- Average journey time: 8 hours Approx.
- Service frequency: Daily
- Train number: 22957 / 22958

On-board services
- Classes: AC 2 Tier, AC 3 Tier, Sleeper Class, General Unreserved
- Seating arrangements: Yes
- Sleeping arrangements: Yes
- Catering facilities: E-catering only
- Observation facilities: Large windows
- Baggage facilities: No
- Other facilities: Below the seats

Technical
- Rolling stock: LHB coach
- Track gauge: 1,676 mm (5 ft 6 in)
- Operating speed: 110 km/h (68 mph) maximum, 55 km/h (34 mph) average including halts.
Route map
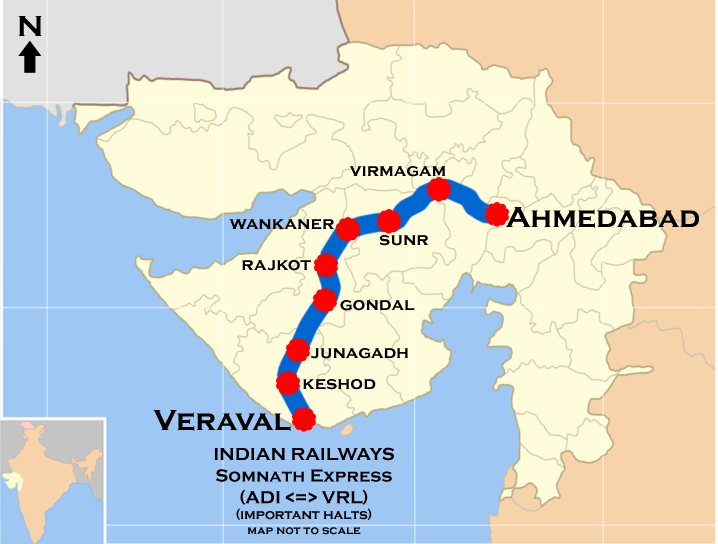

The 22957 / 22958 Somnath Superfast Express is a superfast express train belonging to Indian Railways that runs between Gandhinagar Capital and Veraval Junction in India.

The journey takes approximately eight hours.

It is hauled by a Vatva Loco Shed based WAP-4E electric locomotive.
