= Rajkot–Somnath line =

Railway line in Gujarat, India

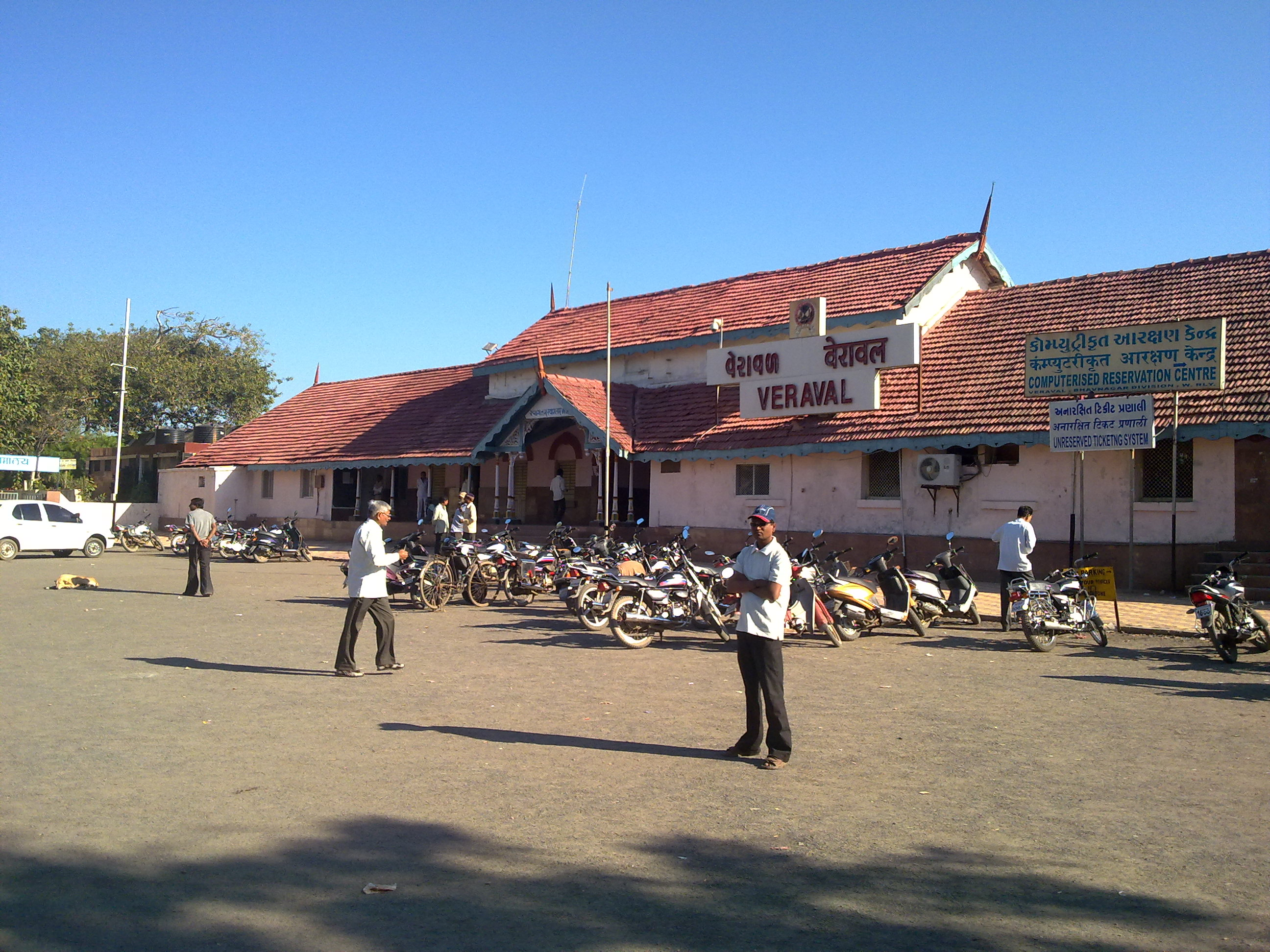
- Veraval the important station on Rajkot–Somnath line

Overview
- Status: Operational
- Owner: Indian Railways
- Locale: Gujarat
- Termini: Rajkot Junction; Somnath

Service
- Type: Regional rail Light rail
- Operator: Western Railway zone
- Depot: Veraval Coach Depot
- Rolling stock: LHB coaches ICF coaches

History
- Opened: 1890; 136 years ago

Technical
- Track length: 190 km (118 mi)
- Number of tracks: 1
- Character: On ground
- Track gauge: 5 ft 6 in (1,676 mm) broad gauge
- Old gauge: 1,000 mm (3 ft 3 3/8 in) metre gauge
- Electrification: Overhead catenary
- Operating speed: up to 125 km/h

The Rajkot–Somnath line is a railway line connecting Rajkot and Veraval. It covers a distance of 190 kilometres (120 mi) in Gujarat.

== History ==
The initial section from Veraval to Junagadh was started in 1880 by Junagadh Railway and opened to traffic in 1888. The line between Rajkot to Jetalsar was started in 1880 by Rajkot–Jetalsar Railway and opened to traffic in 1890. Rajkot–Junagadh-Veraval section was merged with Saurashtra Railway in April 1948. Saurashtra Railway was merged into Western Railway on 5 November 1951. Gauge conversion of Rajkot–Veraval section was announced in 1996–97. Gauge conversion of Rajkot–Veraval has been completed in 2003.
