= Rajkot Junction railway station =

Railway station in Gujarat, India

Rajkot Junction
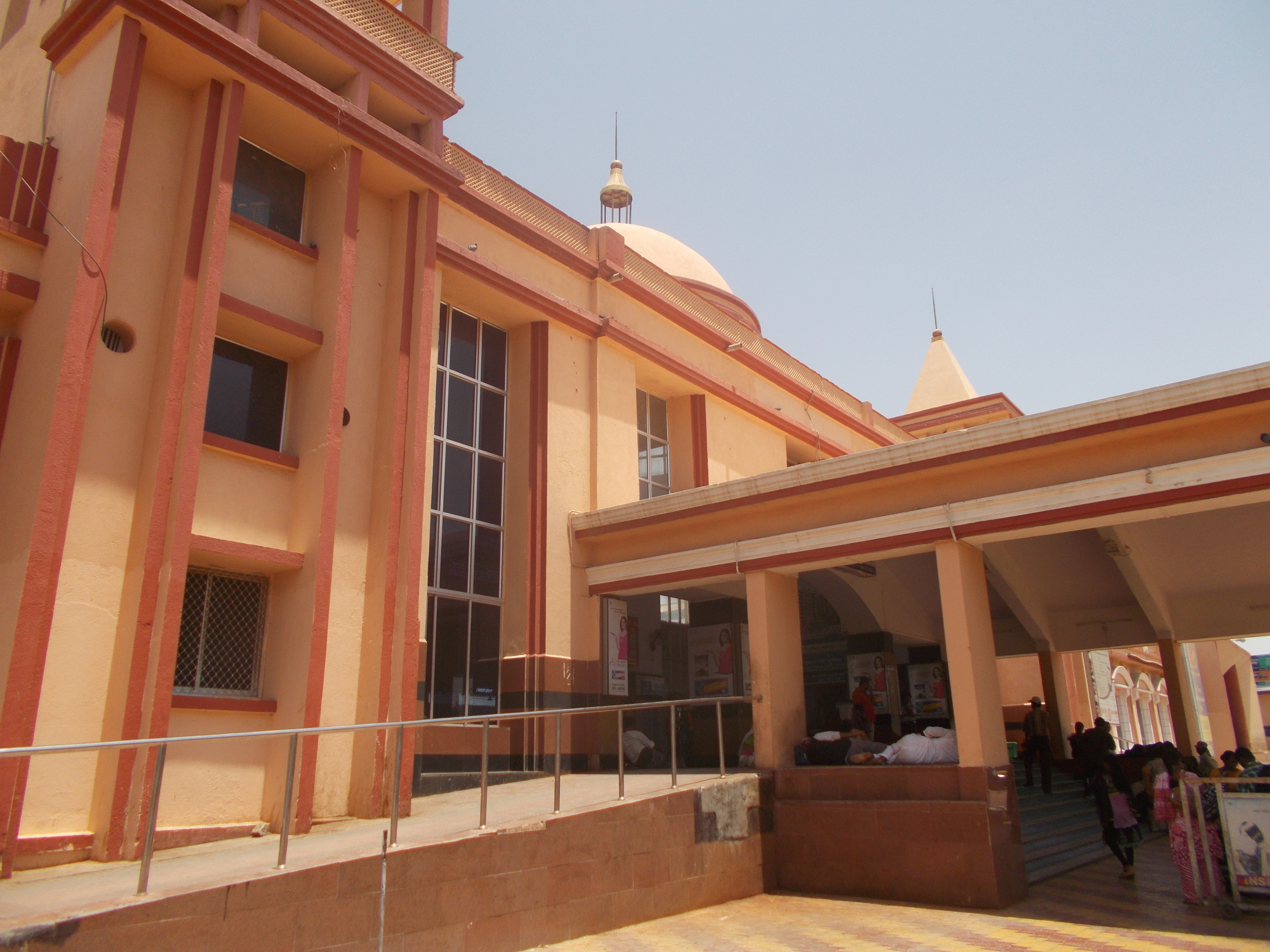
- Rajkot Junction railway station

General information
- Location: Rajkot, Gujarat; India
- Coordinates: 22°18′42″N 70°48′10″E
- Elevation: 119.610 m (392 ft)
- System: Indian Railways station
- Lines: Viramgam–Okha line Rajkot–Somnath line
- Platforms: 7
- Tracks: 9

Construction
- Structure type: Standard
- Parking: Yes

Other information
- Status: Functioning
- Station code: RJT
- Zone(s): Western Railways
- Division(s): Rajkot

History
- Opened: 1890; 136 years ago
- Former names: Rajkot–Jetalsar Railway
Location
- Location within India Location within Gujarat
- Interactive map

Rajkot Junction railway station is a railway station in the city of Rajkot, Gujarat. It is a major railway station in Saurashtra. It is connected to Wankaner Junction in north, Jamnagar in west and Jetalsar Junction in south. Many trains start from here.

== Administration ==
It falls under the Western Railway zone of the Indian Railways. It is the primary terminus for rail transport for the city; the other railway station in Rajkot is the Bhaktinagar railway station. Rajkot Junction railway station has been awarded as the undertaken by Railway ministry in participation with IRCTC.

== Station development and modernization ==
The station is undergoing large-scale automation and infrastructure development. Doubling of the Viramgam–Surendranagar–Rajkot route, of which Viramgam–Surendranagar and Surendranagar–Rajkot has already been completed and commissioned. Once doubling of rail route up to Rajkot is completed, it will reduce travelling time between Rajkot–Ahmedabad by up to 1 hour and a half hour approximately from currently 5 hours, and is expected to increase the number of daily trains and traffic. Doubling of this line will greatly ease the ever-increasing freight traffic between Okha–Rajkot, Porbandar–Kanalus, Veraval–Rajkot and Maliya Miyana / Navalakhi–Dahinsara–Wankaner section. The route (Ahmedabad–Rajkot) is fully electricfied. A proposal, is being considered for railway track doubling between Rajkot Jn.–Okha railway stations by Western Railway, which has been sent to Railway Board for their approval.

== Trains ==
Eighty-one trains halt at Rajkot Junction railway station in both directions.

=== Originating trains ===
Train no.	Train name	Destination
16613 / 16614	Rajkot–Coimbatore Express	Coimbatore
22717 / 22718	Rajkot–Secunderabad Express	Secunderabad
19571 / 19572	Rajkot–Porbandar Express	Porbandar
20913 / 20914	Rajkot–Delhi Sarai Rohilla Weekly Superfast Express	Delhi Sarai Rohilla
22937 / 22938	Rajkot–Rewa Superfast Express	Rewa
