= Nadiad Junction railway station =

Railway station in Gujarat, India

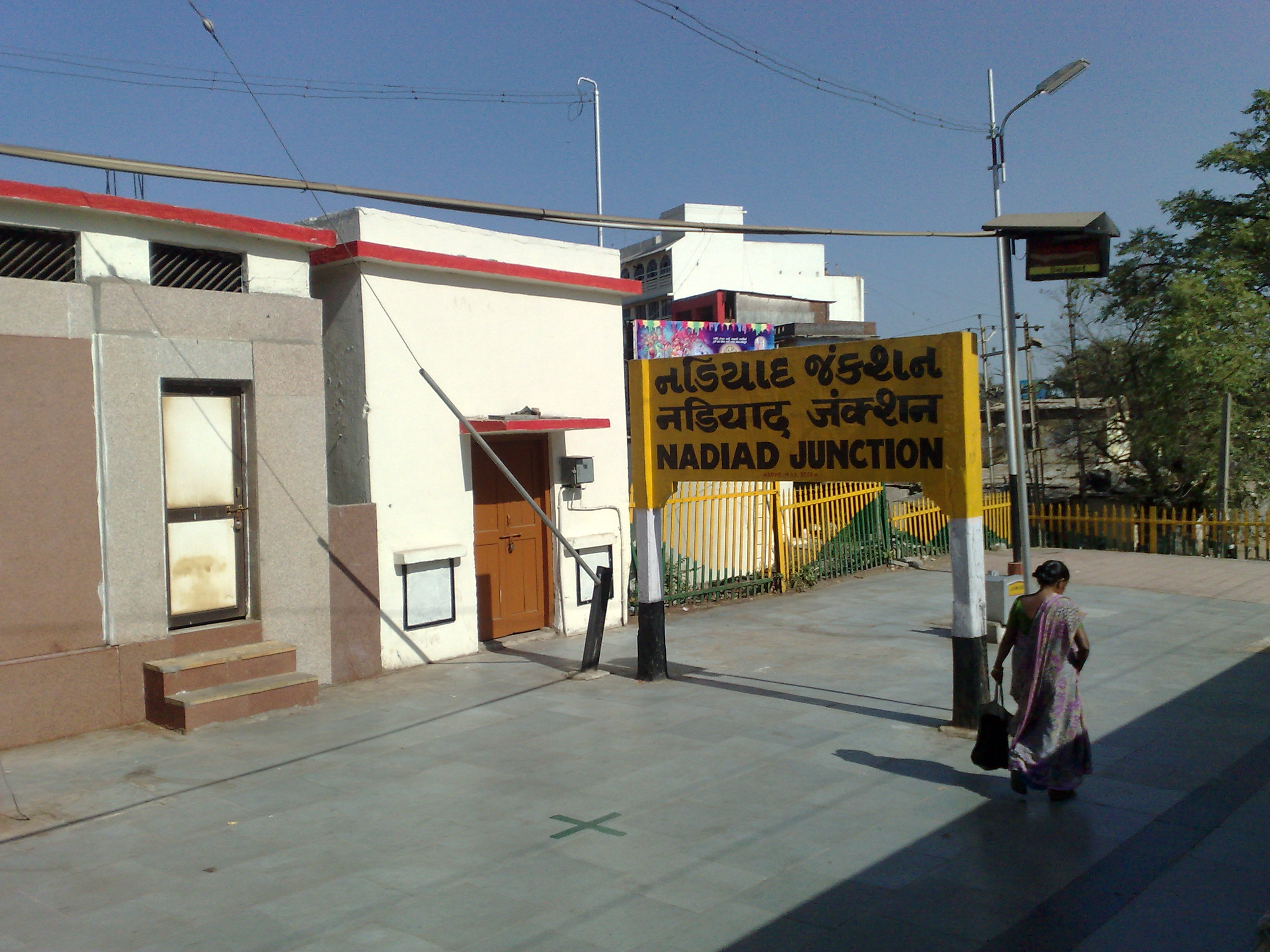

General information
- Location: R.T.Patel Road, Nadiad, Gujarat; India
- Coordinates: 22°41′36″N 72°51′27″E
- Elevation: 37 metres (121 ft)
- System: Express train and Passenger train station
- Owner: Indian Railways
- Operator: Western Railway
- Lines: Ahmedabad–Mumbai main line Nadiad–Modasa line Nadiad–Bhadran line
- Platforms: 4
- Tracks: 8
- Connections: Auto stand, Taxi stand

Construction
- Structure type: Standard (on-ground station)
- Parking: Yes
- Cycle facilities: Yes

Other information
- Status: Functioning
- Station code: ND
- Zone(s): Western Railway
- Division(s): Vadodara

History
- Opened: 1945

Services
Preceding station	Indian Railways	Following station
Gothaj towards Ahmedabad Junction	Ahmedabad–Mumbai main line	Uttarsanda towards Mumbai Central
Location
- Location within India Location within Gujarat

Nadiad Junction (station code: ND) is a major railway station in the Kheda district of Gujarat State of India. It serves Nadiad city. It is under Vadodara railway division of Western Railway zone of Indian Railways. It is "A" category railway station of Western Railway Zone of Indian Railways. It has four platforms. Each day five train originate from Nadiad Junction. Nadiad Junction handles more than 100 trains daily. If one wants to travel to Modasa, Kapadvanj, Petlad and Bhadran, they can change the train route from here. Indian Railways has decided to convert Nadiad-Bhadran Narrow Gauge Line to Broad Gauge line and Modasa line to be extended to Shamlaji.

== History ==
Basically Structure of Nadiad Junction was built in 1945 but the First Railway line which is Nadiad to Bhadran (Narrow Gauge) was started in 1837 by Sayajirao Gaekwad. Also Nadiad to Kapadvanj a narrow gauge train was running but currently this line is converted to Broad Gauge.It is main railway station in nadiad .

== Development ==
Indian Railways is going to develop a Multi Functional Complex at Nadiad Junction and Indian Railways is thinking to Create a New Railway line between Nadiad to Dholka and Nadiad - Mahemdavad - Kheda - Tarapur

== Trains ==
Some of the trains that pass through Nadiad Junction are:

- 12010/09 Shatabdi Express
- 82901/02 Ahmedabad–Mumbai Central Tejas Express
- 20947/48 Ahmedabad - Kevadia Jan Shatabdi Express
- 20949/50 Ahmedabad - Kevadia Jan Shatabdi Express
- 12941/42 Parasnath Express
- 12971/72 Bandra Terminus–Bhavnagar Terminus Express
- 22955/56 Kutch Express
- 12833/84 Howrah–Ahmedabad Superfast Express
- 14707/08 Ranakpur Express
- 22137/38 Prerana Express
- 12215/16 Delhi Sarai Rohilla–Bandra Terminus Garib Rath Express
- 19167/68 Sabarmati Express
- 19165/66 Ahmedabad–Darbhanga Sabarmati Express
- 22927/28 Lok Shakti Express
- 19707/08 Amrapur Aravali Express
- 12947/48 Azimabad Express
- 22945/46 Saurashtra Mail
- 19419/20 Chennai Central–Ahmedabad Express
- 12917/18 Gujarat Sampark Kranti Express
- 12901/02 Gujarat Mail
- 12489/90 Bikaner–Dadar Superfast Express
- 12959/60 Dadar–Bhuj Superfast Express
- 16209/10 Mysore–Ajmer Express
- 16507/08 Jodhpur–Bangalore City Express (via Hubballi)
- 12989/90 Dadar–Ajmer Superfast Express
- 19115/16 Sayajinagari Express
- 12843/44 Puri–Ahmedabad Express
- 11095/96 Ahimsa Express
- 12931/32 Mumbai Central–Ahmedabad Double Decker Express
- 11463/64 Somnath–Jabalpur Express (via Itarsi)
- 11465/66 Somnath–Jabalpur Express (via Bina)
- 19309/10 Shanti Express
- 19215/16 Saurashtra Express
- 22953/54 Gujarat Superfast Express
- 12655/56 Navjeevan Express
- 19033/34 Gujarat Queen
- 17017/18 Rajkot–Secunderabad Express
- 22959/60 Surat–Jamnagar Intercity Express
- 12009/10 Mumbai Central–Ahmedabad Shatabdi Express
- 12473/74 Gandhidham–Shri Mata Vaishno Devi Katra Sarvodaya Express
- 16587/88 Yesvantpur–Bikaner Express
- 19035/36 Vadodara–Ahmedabad Intercity Express
- 12933/34 Karnavati Express
- 12997/98 Bandra Terminus - Barmer Humsafar Express
- 21901/02 Bandra Terminus - Barmer Humsafar Express
- 21903/04 Bandra Terminus - Bikaner AC Superfast Express
