= Barejadi Nandej railway station =

Railway station in Gujarat, India

General information
- Location: Barejadi, Ahmedabad district, Gujarat; India
- Coordinates: 22°53′42″N 72°40′36″E
- Elevation: 39 m (128 ft)
- System: Express train & Passenger train station
- Owner: Indian Railways
- Operator: Western Railway
- Line: Ahmedabad–Mumbai main line
- Platforms: 3
- Tracks: 3

Construction
- Structure type: Standard (on-ground station)
- Parking: Yes

Other information
- Status: Functioning
- Station code: BJD
- Zone(s): Western Railway
- Division(s): Vadodara
Location
- Location within India Location within Gujarat Location within Ahmedabad

Barejadi Nandej railway station is a railway station under Western Railway zone in Gujarat state, India. Barejadi Nandej railway station is 17 km far away from Ahmedabad railway station. Passenger, MEMU and few Express trains halt at Barejadi Nandej railway station.

== Location ==
This railway station is located in the village of Barejadi, Daskroi Taluka, Ahmedabad district, Gujarat.

== Nearby stations ==
Kanij is nearest railway station towards Vadodara, whereas Geratpur is nearest railway station towards Ahmedabad.

== Major trains ==
Following Express trains halt at Barejadi Nandej railway station in both direction:

- 19033/34 Gujarat Queen
- 19215/16 Saurashtra Express
- 19035/36 Vadodara–Ahmedabad Intercity Express
- 22953 Gujarat Express
