= Petlad Junction railway station =

Railway station in Gujarat, India

General information
- Location: Petlad, Anand district India
- Coordinates: 22°29′09″N 72°48′09″E
- Elevation: 32 metres (105 ft)
- System: Indian Railways station
- Owner: Ministry of Railways, Indian Railways
- Operator: Western Railway
- Line: Anand–Khambhat line
- Platforms: 3
- Tracks: 3

Construction
- Structure type: Standard (on ground)
- Parking: No

Other information
- Status: Functioning
- Station code: PTD
- Zone(s): Western Railway
- Division(s): Vadodara
Location
- Location within India Location within Gujarat

Petlad Junction railway station is a railway station on the Western Railway network in the state of Gujarat, India. Petlad Junction railway station is 21 km far away from Anand railway station. Passenger, DEMU trains halt at Petlad Junction railway station.

== See also ==
- Anand district
