= Vadtal Swaminarayan railway station =

Railway Station in Gujarat, India

Vadtal Swaminarayan
- Indian Railway Stations logo

General information
- Location: Vadtal, Kheda district, Gujarat; India
- Coordinates: 22°35′50″N 72°52′30″E
- Elevation: 41 metres (135 ft)
- System: Indian Railway Station
- Owner: Ministry of Railways, Indian Railways
- Operator: Western Railway
- Line: Kanjari Boriyavi–Vadtal line
- Platforms: 1
- Tracks: 1

Construction
- Structure type: Standard (On Ground)
- Parking: Yes

Other information
- Status: Functioning
- Station code: VTL
- Zone(s): Western Railway
- Division(s): Vadodara

Services
Preceding station	Indian Railways	Following station
Kanjari Boriyavi Junction towards ?	Kanjari Boriyavi–Vadtal line	Terminus
Location
- Location within India Location within Gujarat

Vadtal Swaminarayan railway station is a railway station on the Western Railway network in the state of Gujarat. It serves Vadtal town. Vadtal Swaminarayan railway station is 6 km from Kanjari Boriyavi Junction. Passenger trains start from here.

This railway station is permanently closed.

Vadtal is the pilgrim centre of Swaminarayan Sampraday and well known for Swaminarayan Mandir, Vadtal.

== Trains ==
Following trains start from Vadtal Swaminarayan railway station:

- 79465/66 Vadtal – Anand DEMU
- 79467/68 Vadtal – Anand DEMU
