= Vatva railway station =

Railway station in Gujarat, India

Vatva

General information
- Location: Vatva, Ahmedabad, Gujarat; India
- Coordinates: 22°57′32″N 72°37′46″E
- Elevation: 48 m (157 ft)
- System: Indian Railways station
- Owner: Indian Railways
- Operator: Western Railways
- Line: Ahmedabad–Mumbai main line
- Platforms: 4
- Tracks: 4

Construction
- Structure type: Standard (on-ground station)
- Parking: Yes

Other information
- Status: Functioning
- Station code: VTA
- Zone(s): Western Railway zone
- Division(s): Ahmedabad
Location
- Location within Ahmedabad Location within Gujarat Location within India

Vatva railway station is a railway station under Western Railway zone in Gujarat state, India. Its code is VTA. Vatva also has Diesel Loco Shed in Vatva. Passenger and MEMU trains halt here.

== Location ==
This railway station is located in the Vatva, an industrial area of Ahmedabad district. It is 9 kilometres (5.6 mi) from the main Ahmedabad railway station and 13 kilometres (8.1 mi) from Sardar Vallabhbhai Patel International Airport.

== Nearby stations ==
Maninagar is nearest railway station towards Ahmedabad Junction, whereas Geratpur is nearest railway station towards Vadodara Junction.
