= Kanjari Boriyavi Junction railway station =

Railway station in Gujarat, India

General information
- Location: Kanjari, Gujarat; India
- Coordinates: 22°36′56″N 72°55′19″E
- Elevation: 39 metres (128 ft)
- System: Indian Railways station
- Owner: Ministry of Railways, Indian Railways
- Operator: Western Railway
- Lines: Ahmedabad–Mumbai main line Kanjari Boriyavi–Vadtal line
- Platforms: 4
- Tracks: 4

Construction
- Structure type: Standard (on ground)
- Parking: No

Other information
- Status: Functioning
- Station code: KBRV
- Zone(s): Western Railway
- Division(s): Vadodara
Location
- Location within India Location within Gujarat

Kanjari Boriyavi Junction railway station is a railway station on the Western Railway network in the state of Gujarat, India. It is located in Kanjari, Kheda district of Gujarat, India. Kanjari Boriyavi Junction railway station is 8 km far away from Anand railway station and 11 km far away from Nadiad railway station. Passenger, MEMU and few Express trains halt at Kanjari Boriyavi Junction railway station. Kanjari Boriyavi Junction railway station is also connected to Vadtal by rail.

== About Kanjari Boriyavi Junction ==
Name of railway station is Kanjari Boriyavi Junction because of following reasons:

- Railway station is located near the border of Kheda District and Anand District.
- Kanjari village is located in Kheda district, whereas Boriyavi village is located in Anand district.
- Railway station is Junction railway station because of "Vadtal Line".

== Nearby stations ==
Anand is nearest railway station towards Vadodara, whereas Uttarsanda is nearest railway station towards Ahmedabad.

== Trains ==
Following Express trains halt at Kanjari Boriyavi Junction railway station in both direction:

- 19033/34 Gujarat Queen
- 19215/16 Saurashtra Express
- 19035/36 Vadodara–Ahmedabad Intercity Express
- 22953/54 Gujarat Express

Vadtal trains

- 59163/64 Anand–Vadtal Swami Narayan Passenger
- 59169/70 Anand–Vadtal Swami Narayan Passenger

== See also ==
- Kheda district
- Anand district
