= Gujarat Mail =

Train in India

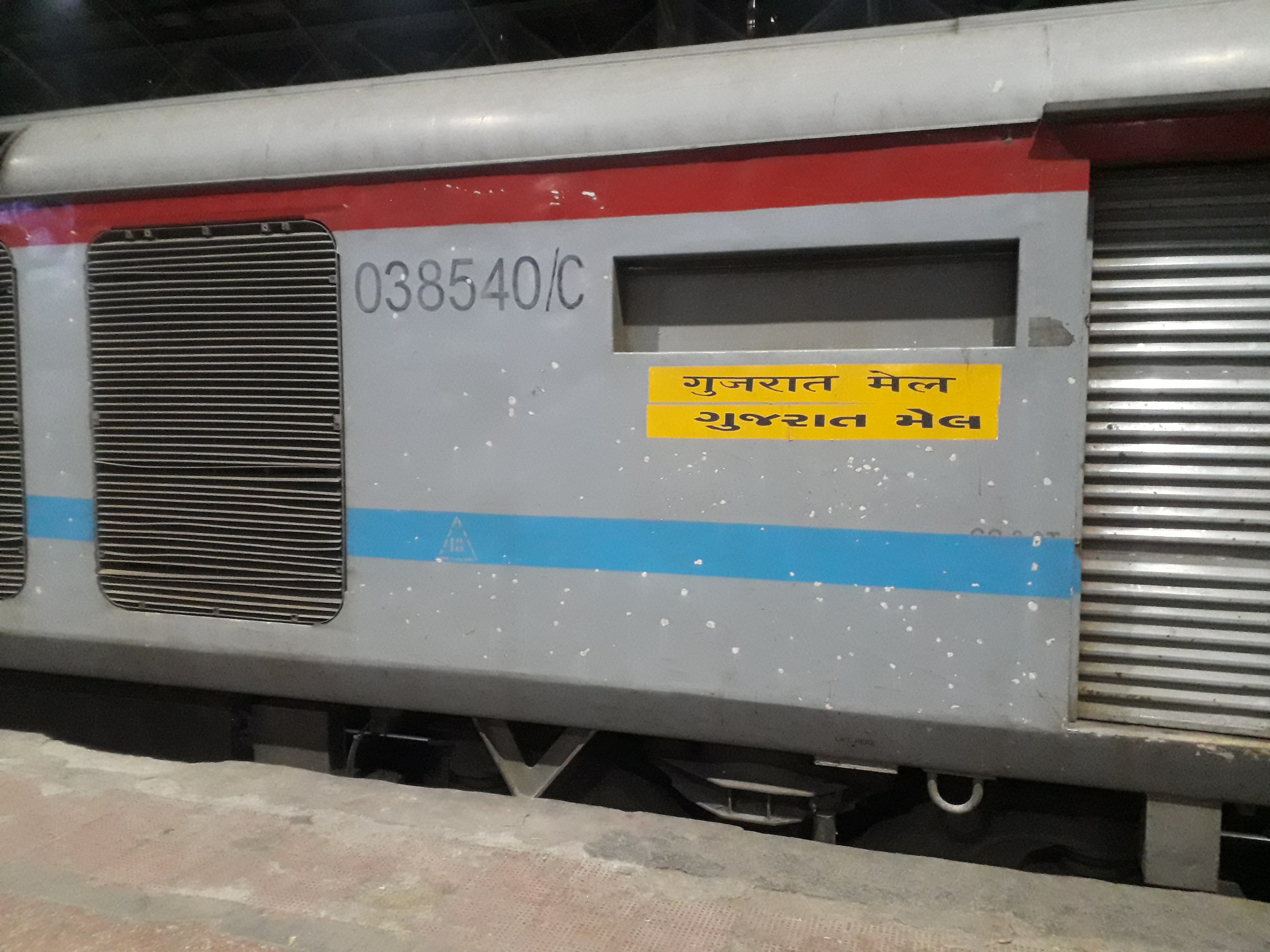

Overview
- Service type: Mail
- Locale: Maharashtra & Gujarat
- First service: 18 January 1870; 156 years ago
- Current operator: Western Railway

Route
- Termini: Ahmedabad (ADI); Dadar (DDR)
- Stops: 11
- Distance travelled: 487 km (303 mi)
- Average journey time: 7 hours 25 minutes
- Service frequency: Daily
- Train number: 12901 / 12902

On-board services
- Classes: AC First Class, AC 2 Tier, AC 3 Tier, AC Chair Car, Sleeper Class, General Unreserved
- Seating arrangements: Yes
- Sleeping arrangements: No
- Auto-rack arrangements: Overhead racks
- Catering facilities: On-board catering, E-catering
- Observation facilities: Large windows
- Baggage facilities: Available
- Other facilities: Below the seats

Technical
- Rolling stock: LHB coach
- Track gauge: 1,676 mm (5 ft 6 in)
- Operating speed: 130 km/h (81 mph) maximum, 66 km/h (41 mph) average excluding halts.
Route map
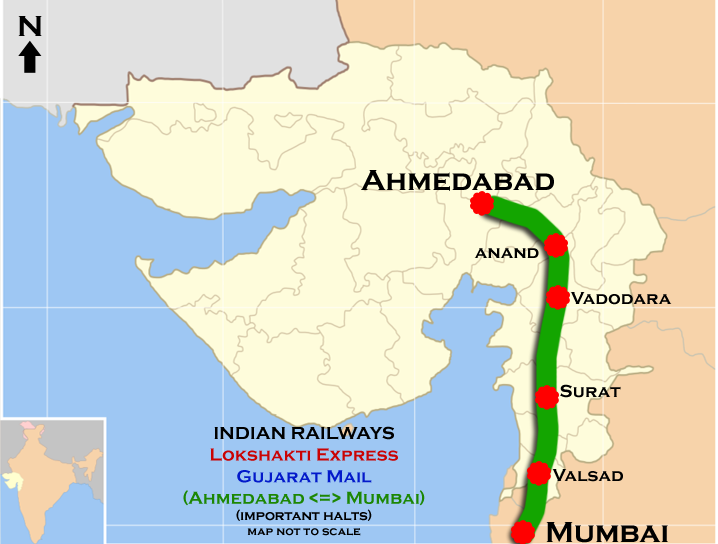

The 12901 / 12902 Gujarat Mail is a Superfast train belonging to Indian Railways that runs between Mumbai and Ahmedabad in India. It is a daily service. It operates as train number 12901 from Dadar Western to Ahmedabad Junction and as train number 12902 in the reverse direction. It operates with LHB coach since 10 September 2016.

== Coaches ==
The Gujarat Mail has 1 AC 1st Class, 3 AC 2 tier, 7 AC 3 tier, 7 Sleeper class, 4 General class coaches and 2 Generator vans. As with most train services in India, coach composition may be amended at the discretion of Indian Railways depending on demand.

== Service ==
It is a daily train & covers the distance of 491 kilometres in 8 hours 35 mins as 12901 Gujarat Mail (57.20 km/h) and 8 hours 25 mins as 12902 Gujarat Mail (58.34 km/h).

== Route & halts ==
- Dadar
- Borivali
- Palghar
- Valsad
- Navsari
- Surat
- Bharuch Junction
- Vadodara Junction
- Anand Junction
- Nadiad Junction
- Mahemdavad Kheda Road
- Maninagar
- Ahmedabad Junction.

== Traction ==
Dual-traction WCAM 2/2P locos would haul the train between Mumbai Central and Ahmedabad. Western Railways completed DC electric conversion to AC on 5 February 2012. It is now regularly hauled by a Vadodara Loco Shed-based WAP-7 or WAP-5 electric locomotive on its entire journey.

== Trivia ==
- It was one of the most prestigious trains on the Western Railways network but its journey time has now increased considerably. Despite being an old prestigious train equipped with LHB coach, Gujarat Mail now leaves before Rajkot–Mumbai Duronto Express, but reaches the final destination 30 minutes after the Duronto Express.
- The Gujarat Mail is a daily service which was originally numbered 1DN/ 2UP.
- Earlier, it would carry a mail coach from which it likely derived its name. This mail coach has now been transferred to the 19143/44 Lok Shakti Express.
- It is an extremely popular train with the Angadia community and is known as the Angadia Express within its circles.

== Gallery ==
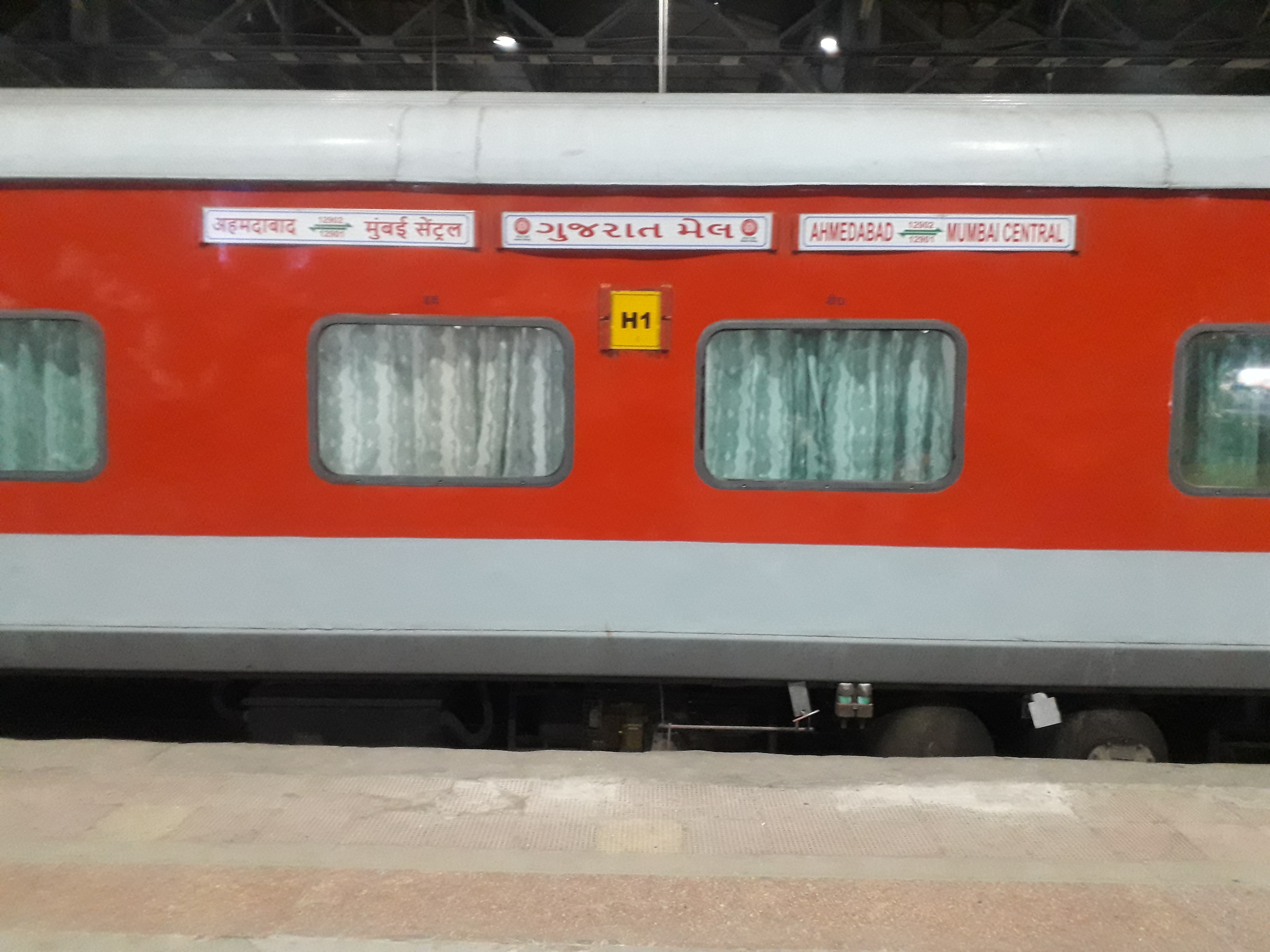
12901 Gujarat Mail – AC 1st Class coach

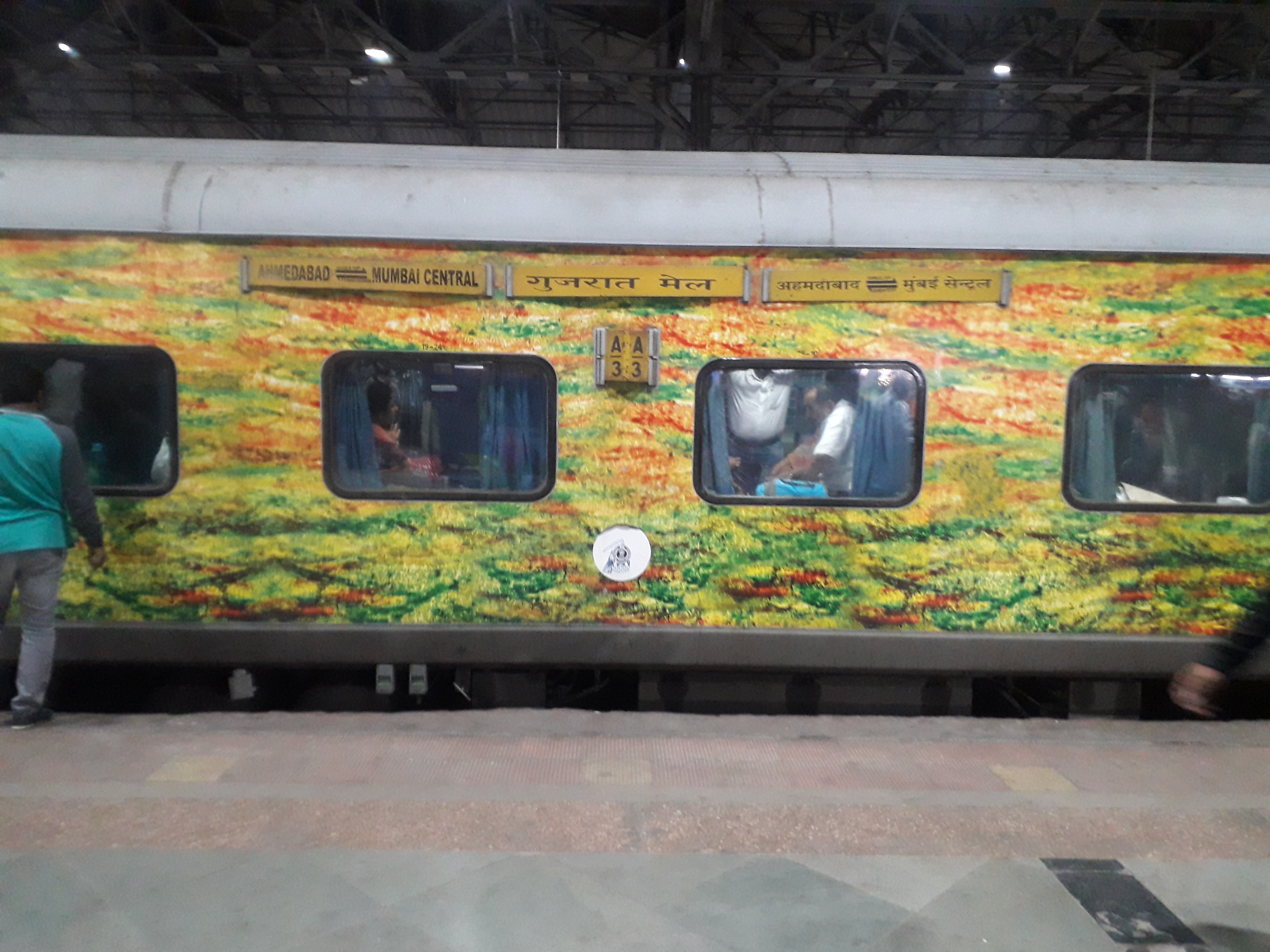
12901 Gujarat Mail – AC 2 tier Class coach

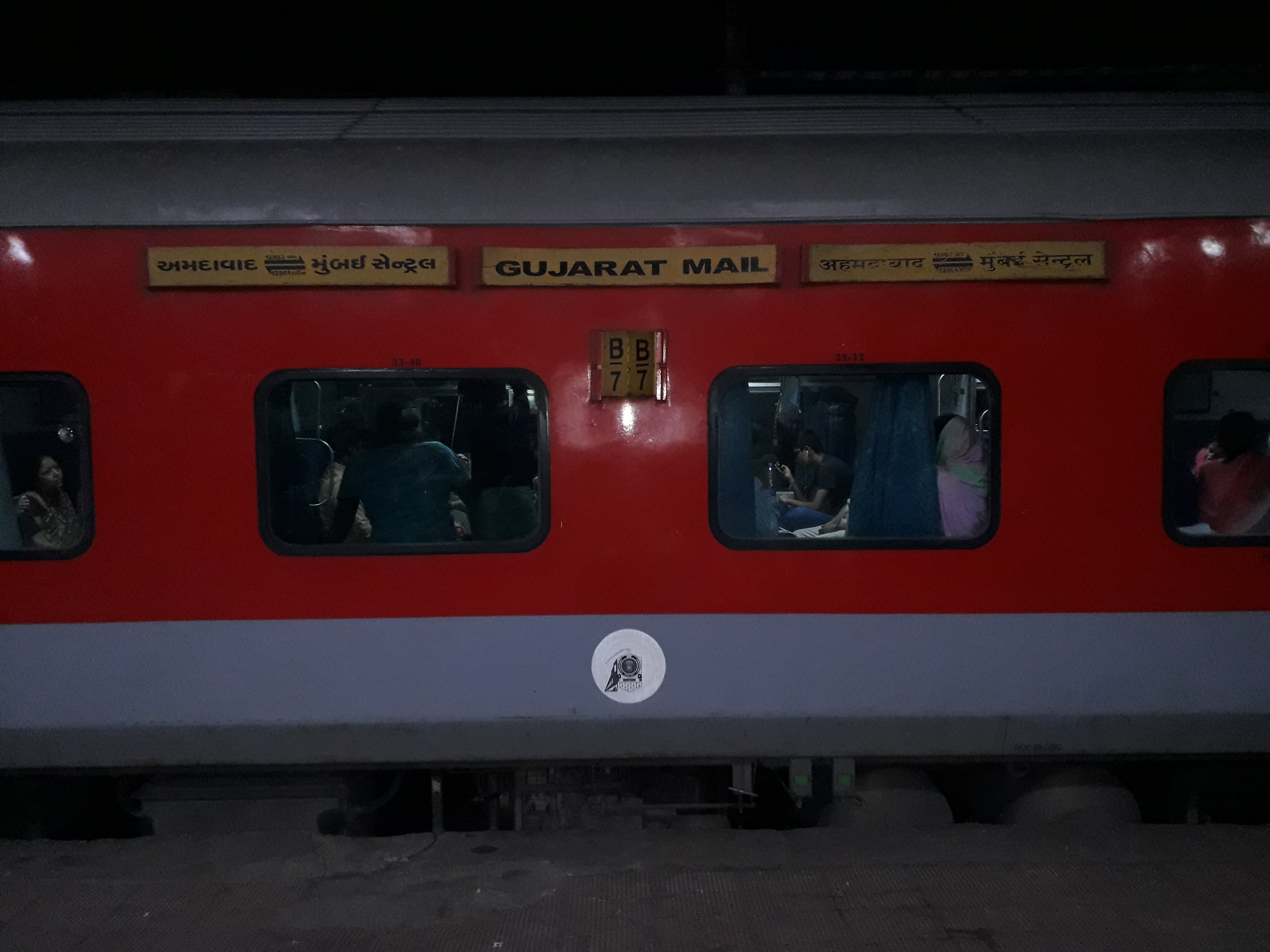
12901 Gujarat Mail – AC 3 tier Class coach

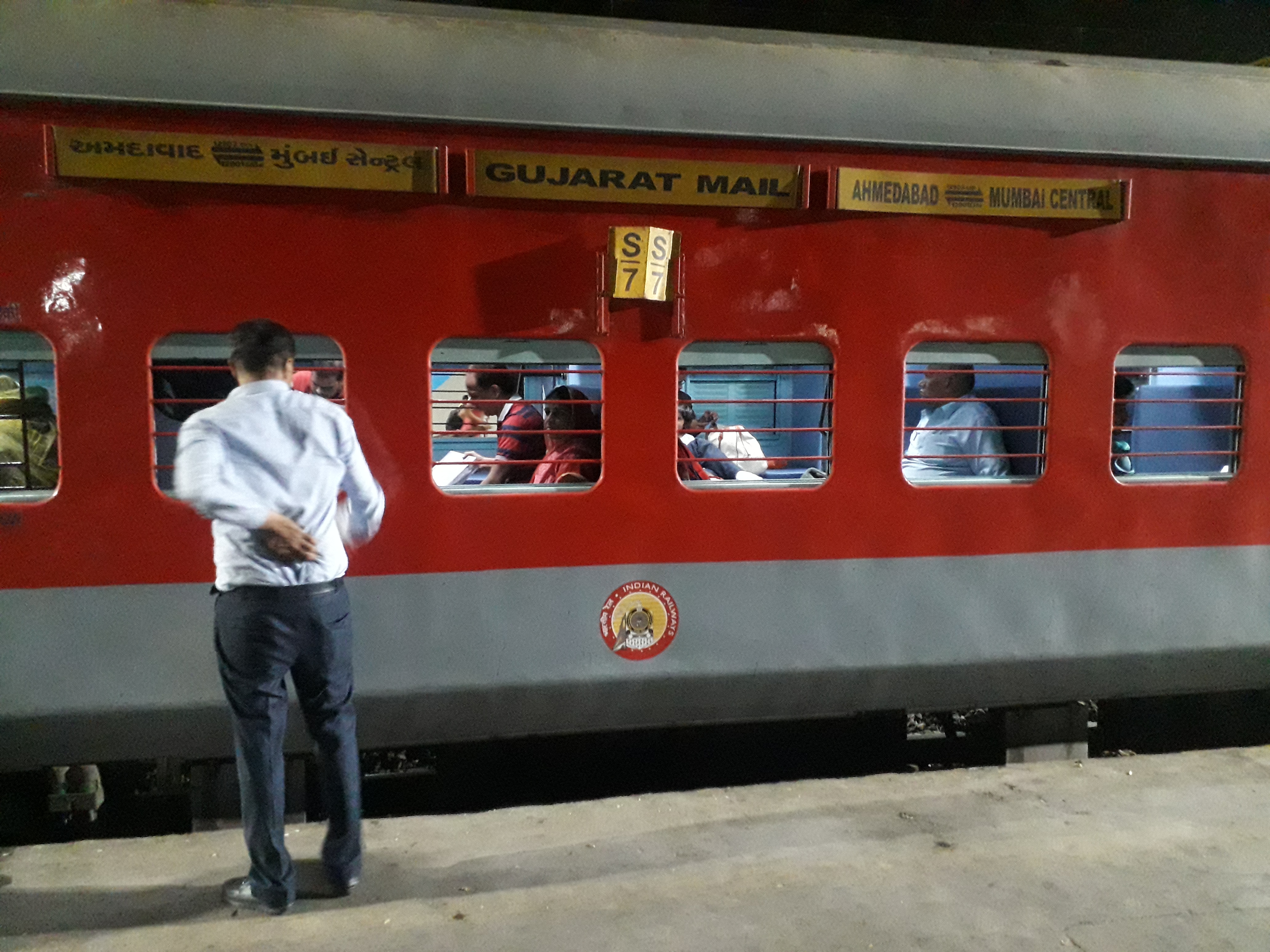
12901 Gujarat Mail – Sleeper class coach

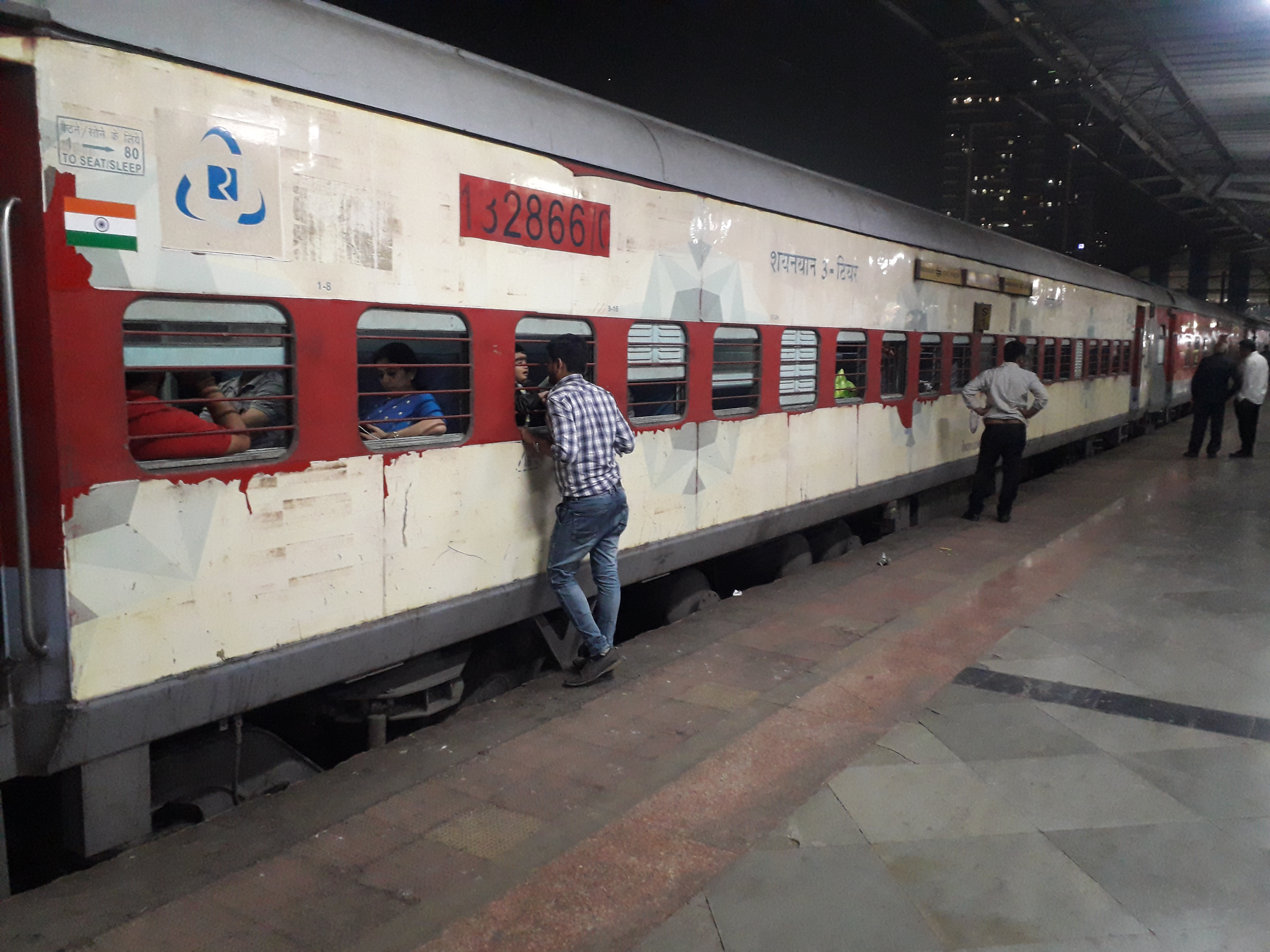
12901 Gujarat Mail – Sleeper class coach – IRCTC

== Time table ==
- 12901 Mumbai Central–Ahmedabad Gujarat Mail leaves Mumbai Central at 22:05 PM IST on a daily basis and reaches Ahmedabad at 06:35 AM IST on the next day.
- 12902 Ahmedabad–Mumbai Central Gujarat Mail leaves Ahmedabad at 22:00 PM IST on a daily basis and reaches Mumbai Central at 06:25 AM IST on the next day.

== Sister trains ==
- Gujarat Queen
- Karnavati Express
- Mumbai Central–Ahmedabad Double Decker Express
- Mumbai Central–Ahmedabad Passenger
- Mumbai Central–Ahmedabad Shatabdi Express
