= Khambhat railway station =

Railway station in Gujarat, India

General information
- Location: Khambhat, Anand district India
- Coordinates: 22°19′23″N 72°37′50″E
- Elevation: 18 metres (59 ft)
- System: Indian Railway Station
- Owner: Ministry of Railways, Indian Railways
- Operator: Western Railway
- Line: Anand–Khambhat line
- Platforms: 2
- Tracks: 2

Construction
- Structure type: Standard (On Ground)
- Parking: No

Other information
- Status: Functioning
- Station code: CBY
- Zone(s): Western Railway
- Division(s): Vadodara

History
- Former names: Cambay
Location
- Location within India Location within Gujarat

Khambhat railway station is a railway station on the Western Railway network in the state of Gujarat, India. DEMU trains start from Khambhat railway station. Khambhat railway station is well connected by rail to Anand Junction.

Six trains pass Khambhat station most days of the week.

== See also ==
- Anand district
