= Anand Junction railway station =

Railway station in Gujarat, India

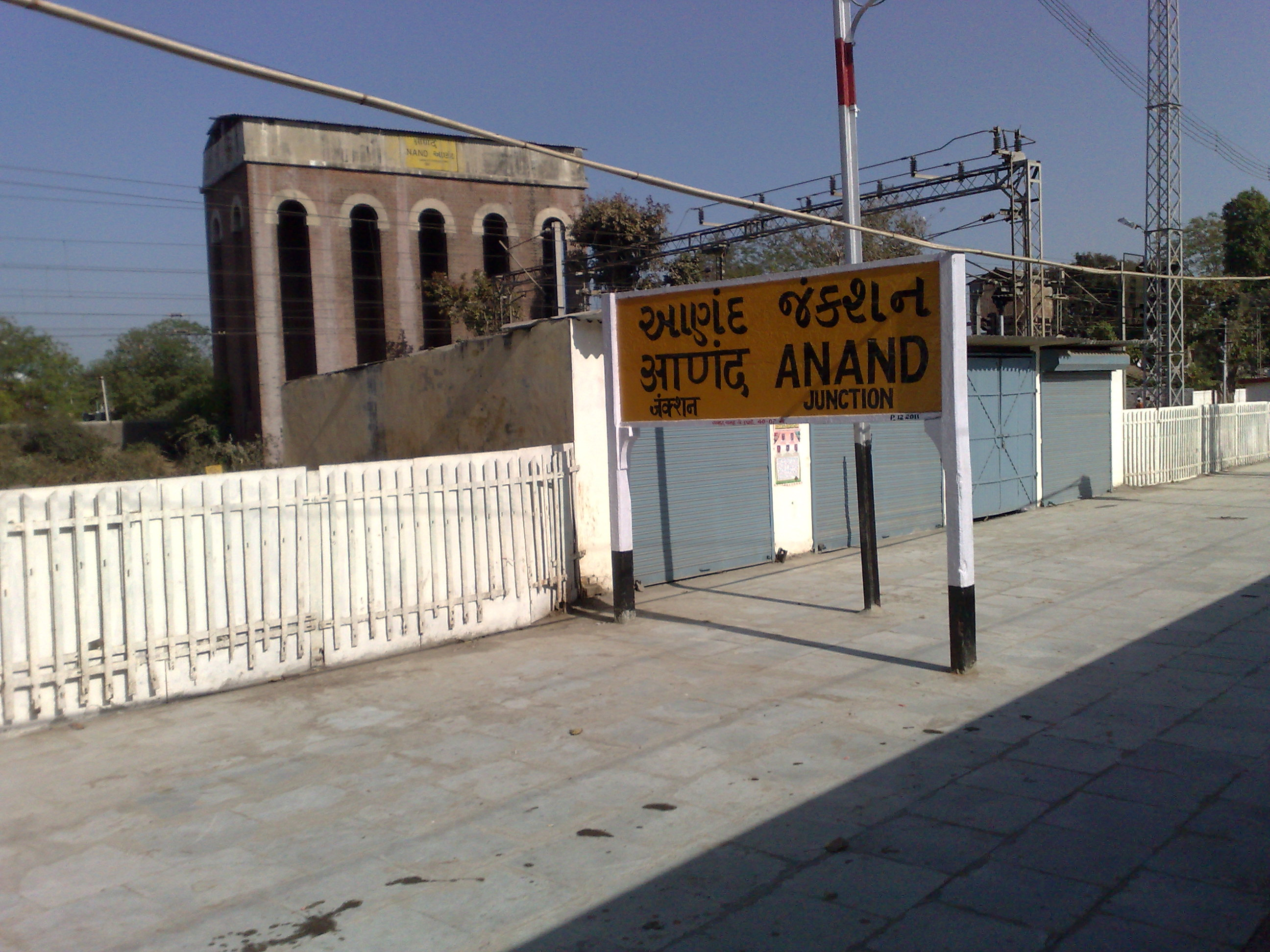

General information
- Location: Anand, Gujarat; India
- Coordinates: 22°33′40″N 72°58′00″E
- Elevation: 45 metres (148 ft)
- System: Indian Railways station
- Owner: Ministry of Railways, Indian Railways
- Operator: Western Railway
- Lines: Ahmedabad–Mumbai main line Anand–Godhra section Anand–Khambhat line
- Platforms: 6
- Tracks: 8

Construction
- Structure type: Standard (on ground)
- Parking: Yes

Other information
- Status: Functioning
- Station code: ANND
- Zone(s): Western Railway
- Division(s): Vadodara
Location
- Location within India Location within Gujarat

Anand Junction (station code: ANND) is a major junction located in Anand, Gujarat. It is a junction on the railway line which connects Ahmedabad with Vadodara and Mumbai and was opened in 1901.

A 14 mile long broad-gauge line was opened in 1929 connecting Vadtal with Anand Junction and Kanjari Boriyavi Junction, with 4 platforms benefitting pilgrims visiting the Swaminarayan Temple in Vadtal. Other broad-gauge branches from Anand connect it to Godhra and Cambay.

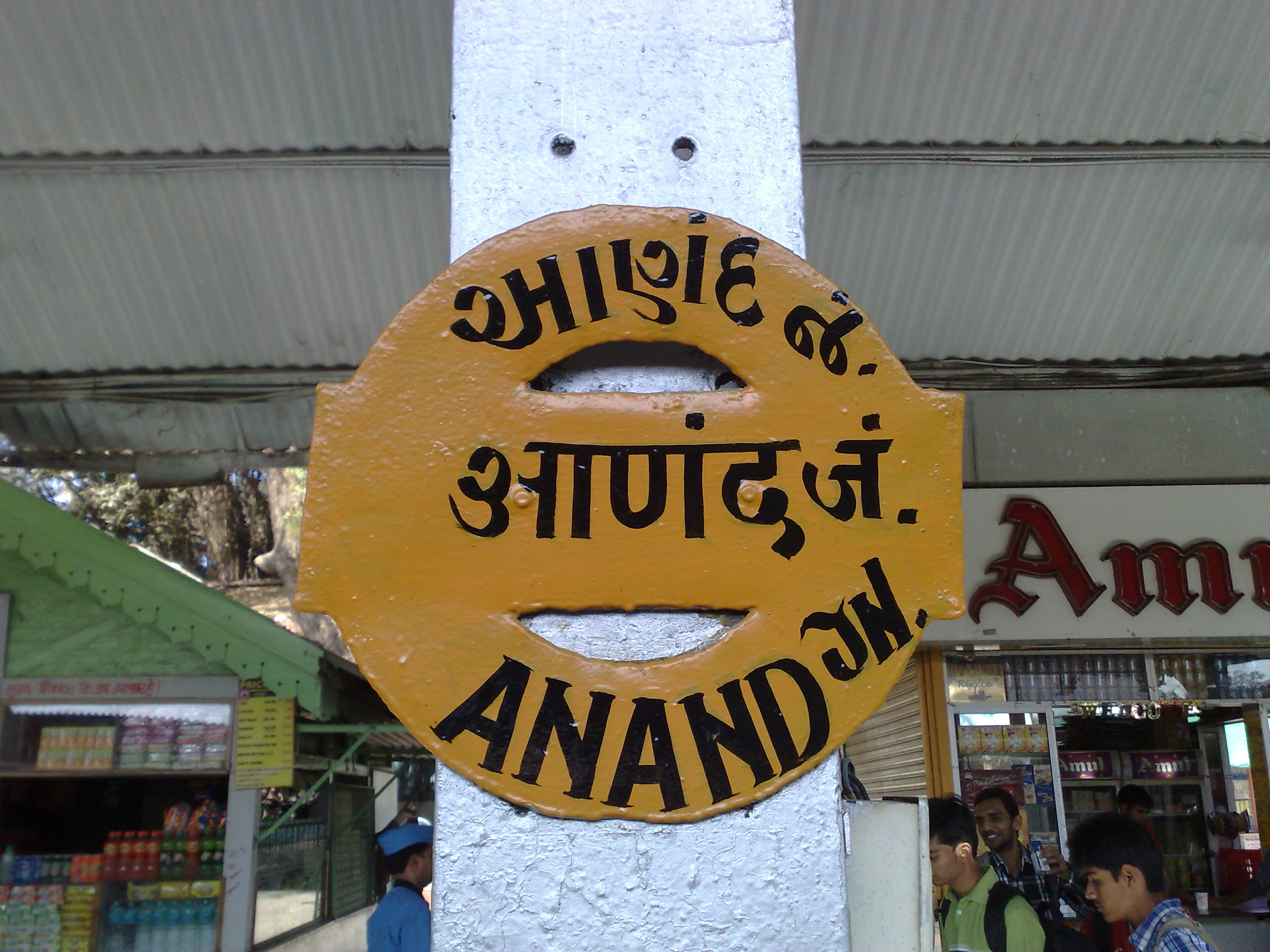
Anand Junction

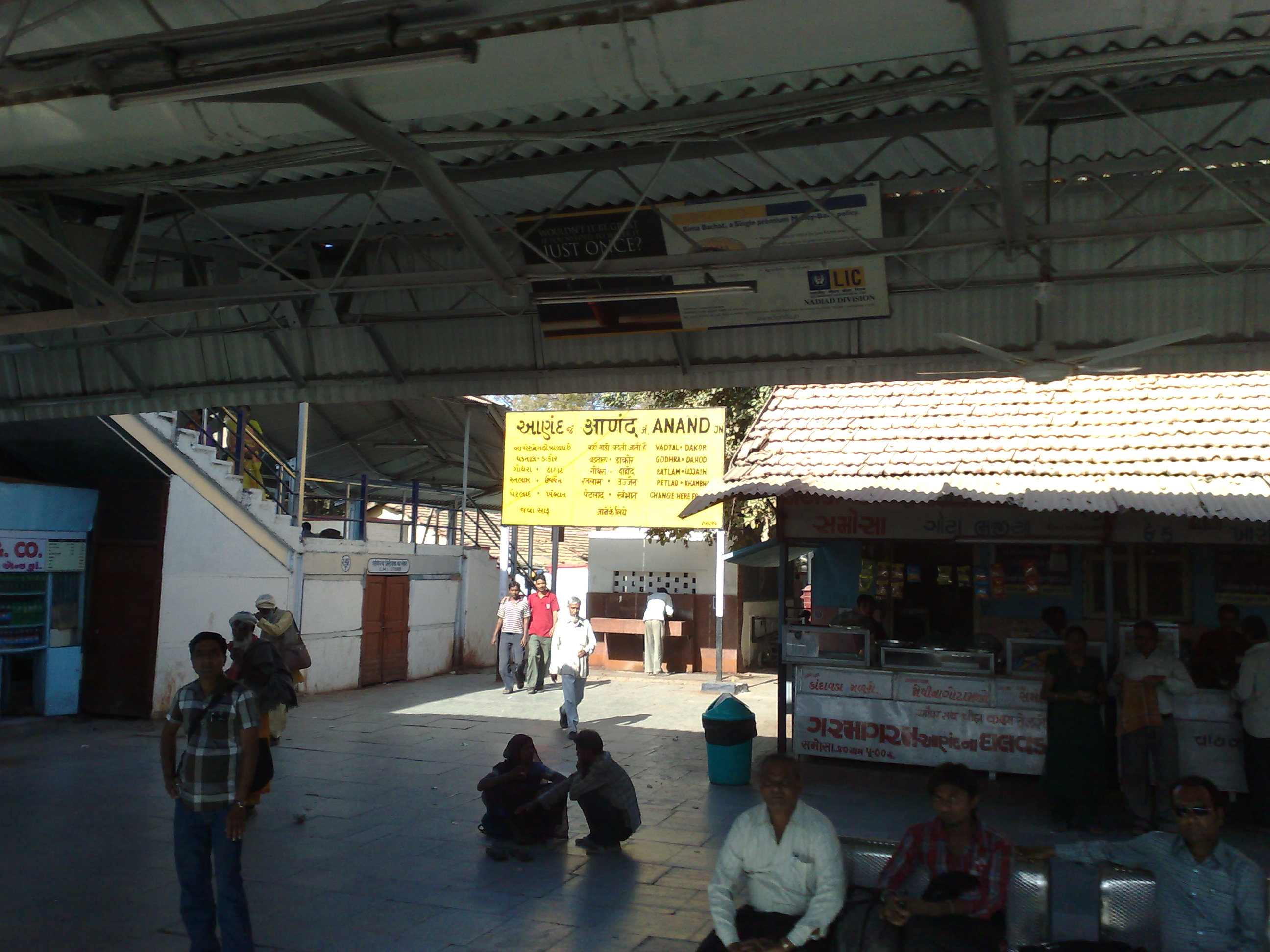
Anand Junction connections

In 2011, Indian Railways announced its intention to set up "multi-function complex" including budget hotels at Anand railway station.

== Trains ==
Some MEMU and DEMU trains which originate and terminates here are:

- Anand-Ahmedabad MEMU
- Anand-Bharuch MEMU
- Anand-Gandhinagar MEMU
- Anand-Godhra MEMU
- Anand-Dahod MEMU
- Anand-Dakor MEMU
- Anand-Khambhat DEMU
- Anand-Vadtal MEMU

Some of the important trains that pass through Anand Junction are:

- 22945/46 Saurashtra Mail
- 22955/56 Kutch Express
- 12971/72 Bandra Terminus–Bhavnagar Terminus Express
- 12833/84 Howrah–Ahmedabad Superfast Express
- 22137/38 Prerana Express
- 19167/68 Sabarmati Express
- 19165/66 Ahmedabad–Darbhanga Sabarmati Express
- 22927/28 Lok Shakti Express
- 19707/08 Amrapur Aravali Express
- 22923/24 Bandra Terminus–Jamnagar Humsafar Express
- 12947/48 Azimabad Express
- 12917/18 Gujarat Sampark Kranti Express
- 12479/80 Suryanagri Express
- 12901/02 Gujarat Mail
- 12933/34 Karnavati Express
- 12843/44 Puri–Ahmedabad Express
- 12989/90 Dadar–Ajmer Superfast Express
- 11463/64 Somnath–Jabalpur Express (via Itarsi)
- 11465/66 Somnath–Jabalpur Express (via Bina)
- 19115/16 Sayajinagari Express
- 12931/32 Mumbai Central–Ahmedabad Double Decker Express
- 19309/10 Shanti Express
- 19215/16 Saurashtra Express
- 22953/54 Gujarat Superfast Express
- 19033/34 Gujarat Queen
- 12655/56 Navjeevan Express
- 12949/50 Kavi Guru Express
- 17017/18 Rajkot–Secunderabad Express
- 12009/10 Mumbai Central–Ahmedabad Shatabdi Express
- 12473/74 Gandhidham–Shri Mata Vaishno Devi Katra Sarvodaya Express
- 22959/60 Surat–Jamnagar Intercity Express
- 19035/36 Vadodara–Ahmedabad Intercity Express
- 11095/96 Ahimsa Express
- 14707/08 Ranakpur Express
- 16337/38 Ernakulam–Okha Express
- 16587/88 Yesvantpur – Bikaner Express
- 22451/52 Chandigarh–Bandra Terminus Superfast Express
- 19419/20 Chennai Central−Ahmedabad Express
- 16209/10 Mysore–Ajmer Express
- 16507/08 Jodhpur–Bangalore City Express (via Hubballi)
- 12489/90 Bikaner–Dadar Superfast Express
- 12959/60 Dadar–Bhuj Superfast Express
- 20959/20960 Valsad–Vadnagar Intercity Superfast Express
- 12997/98 Bandra Terminus - Barmer Humsafar Express
- 21901/02 Bandra Terminus - Barmer Humsafar Express
- 21903/04 Bandra Terminus - Bikaner AC Superfast Express
