= Geratpur railway station =

Railway Station in Gujarat, India

General information
- Location: Geratpur, Ahmedabad, Gujarat; India
- Coordinates: 22°55′00″N 72°39′19″E
- Elevation: 41 m (135 ft)
- System: Indian Railways station
- Owner: Indian Railways
- Operator: Western Railway
- Line: Ahmedabad–Mumbai main line
- Platforms: 2
- Tracks: 4

Construction
- Structure type: Standard (on-ground station)
- Parking: Yes

Other information
- Status: Functioning
- Station code: GER
- Zone(s): Western Railway
- Division(s): Vadodara
Location
- Location within India Location within Gujarat

Geratpur railway station is a railway station under Western Railway zone in Gujarat state, India. It serves Geratpur village. Its code is 'GER'. It has 2 platforms. Passenger, MEMU trains halt here.

== Location ==
This railway station is located in the village of Geratpur, Daskroi Taluka, Ahmedabad district, Gujarat.

== Nearby stations ==
Vatva is nearest railway station towards Ahmedabad Junction, whereas Barejadi Nandej is nearest railway station towards Vadodara Junction.
