= Maninagar railway station =

Railway station in Gujarat, India

General information
- Location: Punit Maharaj Road, Maninagar, Ahmedabad (South Zone), Gujarat; India
- Coordinates: 22.998654°N 72.611546°E
- Elevation: 50 m (160 ft)
- System: Indian Railways station
- Owner: Indian Railway
- Operator: Western Railway
- Line: Ahmedabad–Mumbai main line
- Platforms: 3
- Tracks: 3
- Connections: Direct footbridge connecting to BRTS bus station 'Maninagar Railway Station', AMTS bus stops 'Maninagar' and 'Maninagar Cross Roads', Autorickshaw stand

Construction
- Structure type: Standard (on-ground station)
- Parking: Yes

Other information
- Status: Functioning
- Station code: MAN
- Zone(s): Western Railway
- Division(s): Ahmedabad
Location
- Location within Ahmedabad Location within Gujarat Location within India

Maninagar railway station is a major railway station in South Zone, Ahmedabad, India. This railway station is in a developed suburban area of Ahmedabad. It is well connected by rail. It is located 3 km away from Ahmedabad Junction. Sixty-two trains halt here.

== Major trains ==
The following trains halt at Maninagar railway station:

- Howrah–Ahmedabad Superfast Express
- Ahmedabad–Darbhanga Sabarmati Express
- Sabarmati Express
- Lok Shakti Express
- Sayajinagari Express
- Gujarat Mail
- Saurashtra Express
- Gujarat Superfast Express
- Somnath–Jabalpur Express (via Itarsi)
- Somnath–Jabalpur Express (via Bina)
- Gujarat Queen
- Vadodara–Ahmedabad Intercity Express
- Navjeevan Express
- Karnavati Express
- Yesvantpur–Ahmedabad Weekly Express
- Gandhidham–Nagercoil Express
- Ernakulam–Okha Express
- Thiruvananthapuram–Veraval Express
- Bhuj–Pune Express
- Bhagat Ki Kothi–Pune Express
- Bhavnagar Terminus–Kakinada Port Express
- Rajkot–Coimbatore Express
- Rajkot–Secunderabad Express
- Gorakhpur–Okha Express
