= Barejadi =

- Village
- Location in Gujarat, India Barejadi (India)
- Coordinates: 22.895831°N 72.677967°E
- Country: India
- State: Gujarat
- District: Ahmedabad

Population (2011)
  - Total: 1,602

Languages
  - Official: Gujarati, Hindi
- Time zone: UTC+5:30 (IST)
- PIN: 382435
- Vehicle registration: GJ
- Website: gujaratindia.com

Barejadi is a village in Ahmedabad district in the Indian state of Gujarat.

== Demographics ==
As of 2011 India census, Barejadi had a population of 1,602. Males constitute 50.37% of the population and females 49.63%. Barejadi has an average literacy rate of 81.91%: male literacy is 89.30%, and female literacy is 74.42%. In Barejadi, 13.05% of the population is under 6 years of age.

== Transport ==
=== Railway ===
Barejadi Nandej railway station is located on the Western Railway Ahmedabad – Vadodara Segment. It is 17 km Ahmedabad, 82 km from Vadodara.
