= Geratpur =

- Village
- Location in Gujarat, India Geratpur (India)
- Coordinates: 22.915485°N 72.653736°E
- Country: India
- State: Gujarat
- District: Ahmedabad

Population (2011)
  - Total: 2,021

Languages
  - Official: Gujarati, Hindi
- Time zone: UTC+5:30 (IST)
- PIN: 382435
- Vehicle registration: GJ
- Website: gujaratindia.com

Geratpur is a large village in Ahmedabad district in the Indian state of Gujarat.

== Demographics ==
As of 2011 India census, Geratpur had a population of 2,021. Males constitute 52.50% of the population and females 47.50%. Geratpur has an average literacy rate of 88.84%: male literacy is 94.40%, and female literacy is 82.69%. In Geratpur, 10.87% of the population is under 6 years of age.

== Transport ==
=== Railway ===
Geratpur railway station is located on the Western Railway Ahmedabad – Vadodara Segment. It is 13 km from Ahmedabad, 86 km from Vadodara.
