= Ahmedabad–SCSMT Kolhapur Express =

Train in India

Overview
- Service type: Express
- Current operator: Central Railway zone

Route
- Termini: Kolhapur (KOP); Ahmedabad Junction (ADI)
- Stops: 24
- Distance travelled: 952 km (592 mi)
- Average journey time: 18 hours 15 mins
- Service frequency: Weekly
- Train number: 11049 / 11050

On-board services
- Classes: AC 2 tier, AC 3 tier, Sleeper class, General Unreserved, Seating cum Luggage Rakes
- Seating arrangements: Yes
- Sleeping arrangements: Yes
- Catering facilities: E-catering; On-board catering

Technical
- Rolling stock: ICF coach
- Track gauge: 1,676 mm (5 ft 6 in)
- Operating speed: 49 km/h (30 mph)

The 11049 / 11050 Ahmedabad–SCSMT Kolhapur Express is an Express train belonging to Indian Railways – Central Railway zone that runs between Ahmedabad Junction and Kolhapur in India. It is currently being operated with 11049/11050 train numbers on a weekly basis.

It operates as train number 11049 from Ahmedabad Junction to SCSMT Kolhapur and as train number 11050 in the reverse direction, serving the states of Gujarat and Maharashtra.
