= Anand–Khambhat line =

Railway line in Gujarat, India

Overview
- Status: Operational
- Owner: Indian Railways
- Locale: Gujarat
- Termini: Anand; Khambhat (Cambay)
- Stations: 11

Service
- Operator: Western Railway

Technical
- Track length: 53 km (33 mi)
- Num of tracks: 1
- Track gauge: 5 ft 6 in (1,676 mm) broad gauge
- Electrification: Yes

The Anand–Khambhat line belongs to Vadodara division of Western Railway zone in Gujarat State.

== History ==
Anand–Petlad branch was opened in 1890. The length of Anand–Petlad branch was 21.84 km. Petlad–Tarapur branch and Tarapur–Khambhat branch was opened in 1901 respectively.

== Trains from Anand Junction to Khambhat ==
The Anand–Khambhat line* is a railway line in Gujarat, India, connecting Anand Junction with Khambhat. The line serves several towns and localities in the region, including Vallabh Vidyanagar, Karamsad, Petlad, Tarapur and other intermediate stations. It provides rail connectivity between Khambhat and the main railway network at Anand Junction. Passenger services operate along the route, connecting communities in the Anand and Khambhat areas.

Trains from Anand Junction to Khambhat
Train name and number	Departure from Anand Junction	Arrival at Khambhat	Duration	Operating days
Anand Khambhat MEMU (69215)	05:05 am	06:45 am	1h 40m	Daily
Anand Khambhat MEMU (69227)	07:15 am	09:00 am	1h 45m	Daily
Anand Khambhat MEMU (69225)	09:15 am	11:05 am	1h 50m	Daily
Anand Khambhat MEMU (69219)	11:25 am	01:15 pm	1h 50m	Daily
Anand Khambhat MEMU (69217)	01:35 pm	03:20 pm	1h 45m	Daily
Anand Khambhat MEMU (69223)	03:55 pm	05:40 pm	1h 45m	Daily
Anand Khambhat MEMU (69229)	06:00 pm	07:45 pm	1h 45m	Daily
Anand Khambhat MEMU (69221)	07:55 pm	09:45 pm	1h 50m	Not specified
