= Kanjari Boriyavi–Vadtal line =

Railway line in Gujarat, India

Overview
- Status: Operational
- Owner: Indian Railways
- Locale: Gujarat
- Termini: Kanjari Boriyavi Junction; Vadtal

Service
- Operator(s): Western Railway

Technical
- Track length: 6 km (4 mi)
- Number of tracks: 1
- Track gauge: 5 ft 6 in (1,676 mm) broad gauge
- Electrification: Yes

The Kanjari Boriyavi–Vadtal line belongs to Vadodara division of Western Railway zone in Gujarat State.

== History ==
Kanjari–Vadtal branch line was opened in 1929. The length of Kanjari–Vadtal branch line was 6 km.
