= Uttarsanda =

Place in Gujarat, India

Uttarsanda Utarsanda
- Place
- Railway station board

- Location in Gujarat, India Uttarsanda (India)
- Coordinates: 22°39′28″N 72°53′53″E
- Country: India
- State: Gujarat
- District: Kheda
- Named after: Municipal Corporation

Government
  - Type: Nadiad Municipal Corporation

Population
  - Total: 12,000−15,000 (Approx.)

Languages
  - Official: Gujarati,
- Time zone: UTC+5:30 (IST)
- Vehicle registration: GJ-7
- Metropolitan Urban Region: Nadiad

Uttarsanda, also spelled Utarsanda, is a village in Nadiad Metropolitan Urban Region of Kheda district, Gujarat, India. It is well known for its snacks industry.

== Demography ==
The place has a population of about 12,000 to 15,000. There is a large number of people living abroad who are native to Uttarsanda, as part of the Gujarati diaspora.

== Amenities ==
The "smart village" has modern amenities including schools such as M I Patel English Medium School, crematoriums, bus stops and ponds. Vera lake was developed as a public space at the cost of ₹2 crore (US$210,000) while Goya lake is also developed.

== Economy ==
The place is known for the production of local snacks like Cholafali, Mathiya and Papad. The first factory was established in 1986-87 known as "Uttam". It originally operated in Sandhana village near Matar but used to bring water from Uttarsanda so it moved here to cut cost. There are more than 35 factories producing these snacks and are primarily run by women. During Diwali days, they collectively produce more than 700 ton of these snacks which are worth ₹70 crore (US$7.3 million). Around 50% of it is exported, 15% is sold in states other than Gujarat while the rest is sold in Gujarat.

== Transport ==
The place has two bus stations towards Nadiad and Anand respectively.

Utarsanda railway station (UTD) is located here. The Anand-Nadiad station of the under construction Mumbai–Ahmedabad high-speed rail corridor is located near the place.
