= Mumbai Central–Ahmedabad Shatabdi Express =

Shatabdi Express train in India

Mumbai Central - Ahmedabad Junction Shatabdi Express
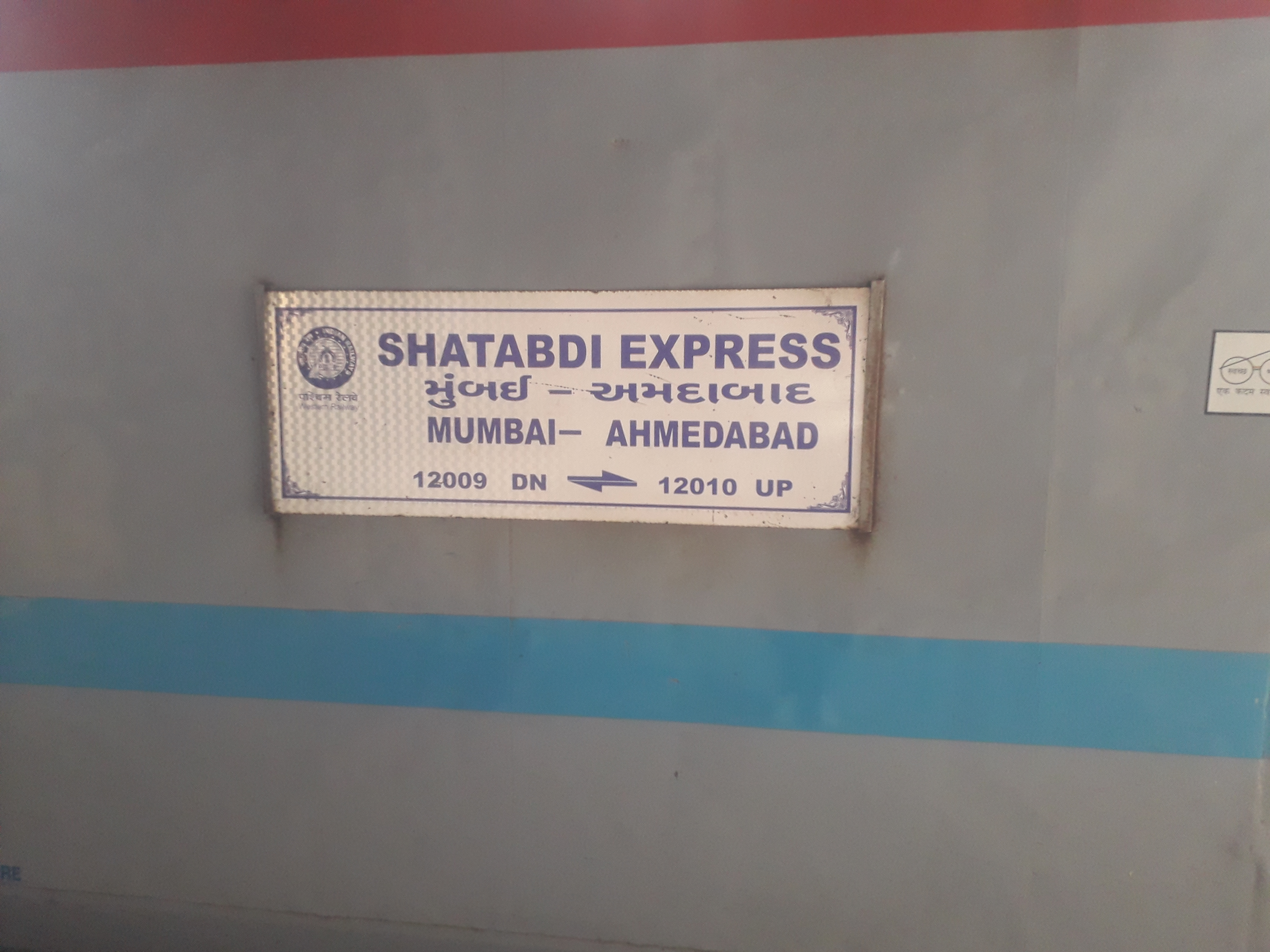

Overview
- Service type: Shatabdi Express
- Locale: Maharashtra & Gujarat
- First service: May 1, 1994; 31 years ago
- Current operator: Western Railways

Route
- Termini: Mumbai Central (MMCT); Ahmedabad Junction (ADI)
- Stops: 7
- Distance travelled: 495 km (308 mi)
- Average journey time: 6 hours 20 minutes
- Service frequency: Except Sunday
- Train number: 12009 / 12010
- Line used: Mumbai–Ahmedabad main line

On-board services
- Classes: Anubhuti, Executive Chair Car, AC Chair Car, Vistadome
- Seating arrangements: Yes
- Sleeping arrangements: No
- Catering facilities: No pantry car but arranged onboard
- Observation facilities: Large windows
- Baggage facilities: Overhead racks

Technical
- Rolling stock: LHB coach
- Track gauge: 1,676 mm (5 ft 6 in)
- Operating speed: 78 km/h (48 mph) average Including Halts
Route map
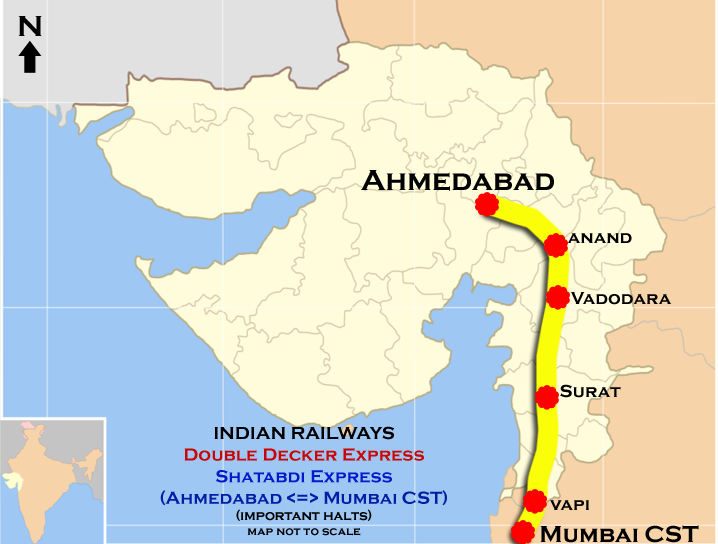

The 12009 / 12010 Mumbai Central - Ahmedabad Shatabdi Express is an Express train of Shatabdi class belonging to Indian Railways that runs between Mumbai Central and Ahmedabad Junction in India. It is a 6 days in week service. Earlier it would operate excluding Fridays, later it was changed to exclude Sundays. It is the first Shatabdi Express which contains Vistadome coach on both ends.

It operates as train number 12009 from Mumbai Central to Ahmedabad Junction and as train number 12010 in the reverse direction. This train is the fastest train among other trains on the Mumbai - Ahmedabad route. It is faster than Ahmedabad - Mumbai Central Tejas Express and Mumbai Central-Ahmedabad Double Decker Express.

== Traction ==
It is hauled by a Vadodara-based WAP-7 and WAP-5 locomotive from end to end.

=== 12009 - Mumbai Central - Ahmedabad Shatabdi Express time table ===
S. No	Station Name & Code	Arrives	Departs	Halt Time	Distance	Avg. Delay	Day
1	Mumbai Ctrl - MMCT	Start	06:20	-	0.0 km	2 Min	1
2	Borivali - BVI	06:43	06:45	2m	29.5 km	9 Min	1
3	Vapi - VAPI	08:07	08:09	2m	168.0 km	4 Min	1
4	Surat - ST	09:15	09:18	3m	263.0 km	2 Min	1
5	Bharuch Jn - BH	09:56	09:58	2m	322.2 km	3 Min	1
6	Vadodara Jn - BRC	10:48	10:53	5m	392.8 km	3 Min	1
7	Anand Jn - ANND	11:24	11:26	2m	428.2 km	2 Min	1
8	Nadiad Jn - ND	11:40	11:42	2m	447.0 km	2 Min	1
9	Ahmedabad Jn - ADI	12:40	End	-	492.8 km	7 Min	1
