= Ahmedabad Junction railway station =

Railway station in Gujarat, India

Ahmedabad Junction Amdavad Junction
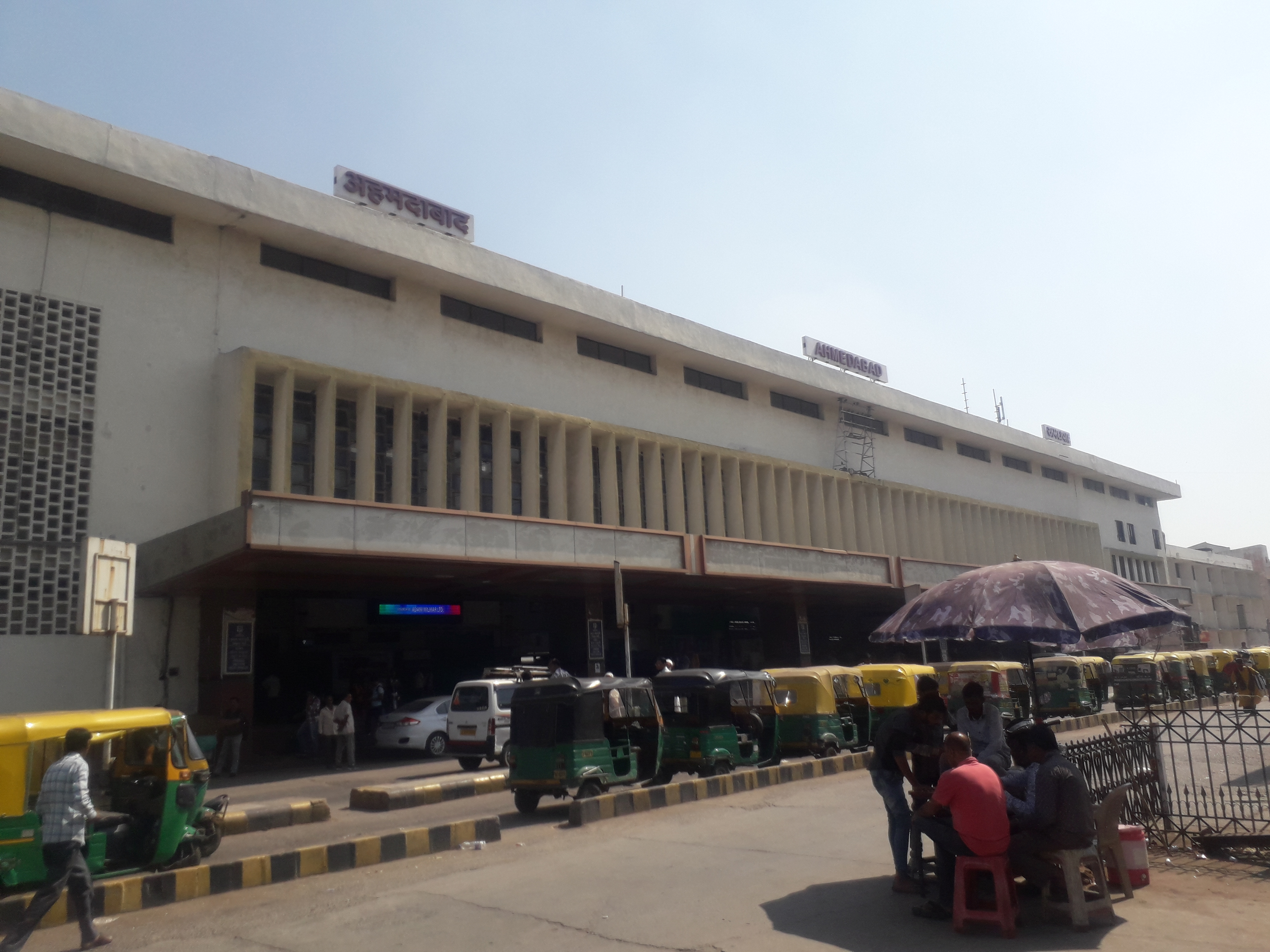
- Ahmedabad Junction railway station

General information
- Location: Kalupur, Ahmedabad, Gujarat; India
- Coordinates: 23°01′35″N 72°36′07″E
- Elevation: 52.5 metres (172 ft)
- System: Indian Railways
- Owner: Indian Railways
- Operator: Western Railways
- Lines: Mumbai–Ahmedabad main line, Vadodara–Ahmedabad section; New Delhi–Ahmedabad main line, Ahmedabad–Gandhinagar Capital section, Ahmedabad–Gandhidham main line, Jaipur–Ahmedabad main line, Ahmedabad–Udaipur line, Ahmedabad–Botad line
- Platforms: 13 (including 2A)
- Tracks: 18
- Connections: Blue Line Kalupur; Janmarg & AMTS; Ahmedabad HSR (under-construction)

Construction
- Structure type: At-grade
- Parking: Yes
- Accessible: Available

Other information
- Status: Functioning (WiFi enabled)
- Station code: ADI
- Zone(s): Western Railway zone
- Division(s): Ahmedabad

History
- Opened: 20 January 1863; 163 years ago
Location
- Location within India Location within Gujarat
- Interactive map

Ahmedabad Junction railway station (station code: ADI), also known as Kalupur railway station, is the main railway station serving Ahmedabad, Gujarat, India .Ahmedabad Junction is an important railway station in Ahmedabad.It also an important railway station of the Western Railway zone and serves as a major rail hub connecting Ahmedabad with various cities across Gujarat and other parts of India. The station is located in the Kalupur area of Ahmedabad.

== History ==
Before the partition of India, the Sindh Mail used to travel to Hyderabad, Sindh via the Hyderabad–Mirpur Khas–Khokhrapar–Munabao–Barmer–Luni–Jodhpur–Pali–Marwar–Palanpur–Ahmedabad route. It was constructed by Gokuldas Contractor and Associates.

== Background ==
Ahmedabad Junction is the primary station of rail transport for the city of Ahmedabad in the state of Gujarat, India and an important center of the Western Railways zone of the Indian Railways. Locally, it is known as Kalupur Station (as it is situated in the Kalupur area of the walled city) to distinguish it from other stations in the city. It contains a total of 12 platforms, of which platforms 10, 11, and 12 are closed due to the Ahmedabad–Mumbai high-speed rail project, and has 16 tracks. It serves trains that connect Ahmedabad to different parts of Gujarat, as well as major Indian cities.

== Major trains ==
The train which originates from Ahmedabad Junction are :

● Ahmedabad–SCSMT Kolhapur Express (11049/11050)

● Mumbai Central–Ahmedabad Shatabdi Express (12009/12010)

● Ahmedabad–Pune Duronto Express (12997/12998)

● Navjeevan Express (12655/12656)

● Howrah–Ahmedabad Superfast Express (12834/12833)

● Puri–Ahmedabad Express (12843/12844)

● Gujarat Mail (12901/12902)

● Gujarat Sampark Kranti Express (12917/12918)

● Mumbai Central–Ahmedabad Double Decker Express (12932/12933)

● Karnavati Express (12934/12935)

● Azimabad Express (12947/12948)

● Darbhanga–Ahmedabad Antyodaya Express (12948/12949)

● Gujarat Queen (19033/19034)

● Sabarmati Express (19165/19166)

● Shanti Express (19309/19310)

● Veer Bhumi Chittaurgarh Express (19315/19316)

● Ahmedabad–Kolkata Express (19413/19414)

● Puri–Ahmedabad Weekly Express (20861/20862)

● Ahmedabad–Ekta Nagar Jan Shatabdi Express (20947/20948)

● MGR Chennai Central–Ahmedabad Superfast Express (20953/20954)

● Prerana Express (22138/22139)

● Ahimsa Express (22186/22187)

● Chennai Central–Ahmedabad Humsafar Express (22920/22921)

● Ahmedabad–Okha Vande Bharat Express (22925/22926)

● Lok Shakti Express (22927/22928)

● Gujarat Express (22953/22954)

● Ahmedabad–Mumbai Central Vande Bharat Express (22961/22962)

● Ahmedabad–Prayagraj (Allahabad) Weekly Superfast Express (22962/22963)

● Ahmedabad–Mumbai Central Tejas Express (82901/82902)

● Ahmedabad–Bhuj Namo Bharat Rapid Rail (94801/94802)

== Railway lines ==
It is the center point railway station of Gujarat many lines begin from here. It includes Ahmedabad–Mumbai main line, Ahmedabad–Delhi main line (via Jaipur), Ahmedabad–Gandhinagar line (via Chandlodiya), Ahmedabad–Gandhidham main line, Jaipur–Ahmedabad line, Ahmedabad–Udaipur line, Ahmedabad–Botad line.

== List of Suburban stations of Ahmedabad ==
There are total 22 railway stations present in Ahmedabad all coming under Western Railway, other 21 are listed below:

Major railway stations are:

| Station name | Station code | Railway Division | Total platforms |
|---|---|---|---|
| Sabarmati BG | SBIB | Ahmedabad | 7 |
| Sabarmati Junction | SBT | Ahmedabad | 3 |
| Maninagar | MAN | Ahmedabad | 3 |
| Asarva | ASV | Ahmedabad | 3 |
| Gandhigram | GG | Bhavnagar | 2 |
| Vatva | VTA | Ahmedabad | 4 |
| Chandlodiya | CLDY | Ahmedabad | 2 |
| Chandlodiya B | CBCC | Ahmedabad | 2 |
| Gandhinagar Capital | GNC | Ahmedabad | 3 |

Minor railway stations are:

| Station name | Station code | Railway Division | Total platforms |
|---|---|---|---|
| Ambli Road | ABD | Ahmedabad | 3 |
| Sarkhej | SEJ | Bhavnagar | 2 |
| Naroda | NRD | Ahmedabad | 4 |
| Sardargram | SDGM | Ahmedabad | 1 |
| Chandkheda Road | CDK | Ahmedabad | 2 |
| Vastrapur | VTP | Bhavnagar | 1 |
| Geratpur | GER | Vadodara | 2 |
| Sahijpur | SAHP | Ahmedabad | 1 |
| Khodiyar | KHDB | Ahmedabad | 3 |
| Kali Road | KLRD | Ahmedabad | 2 |
| Gora Ghuma | GGM | Ahmedabad | 2 |
| Sanathal | SNTL | Bhavnagar | 1 |

== Loco Sheds ==
There are two Diesel Loco Shed of Western Railway present in Ahmedabad of its two suburban railway stations, that are Vatva and Sabarmati Junction. Vatva's Diesel Loco Shed holds over 100 ALCO locomotives, including the WDG-3A, WDM-3A, WDM-3D, WDS-6, WAP-4 and WAG-5 while Sabarmati's Diesel Loco Shed holds over 200 EMD locomotives, including the WDP 4D, WDG 4, WDG 4D, and WDG-5.

== Infrastructure ==
The station has 12 platforms. There are an ample numbers of tea stalls, snack bars, medical shops, and enquiry desks. The station also has one cybercafe which is run by Tata Indicom and is currently equipped with Wi-Fi by Google Station and RailTel. The station is undergoing large-scale automation to make it a technologically advanced station, and new ATM outlets from ICICI Bank, Canara Bank, Union Bank of India, Dena Bank, Bank of Baroda, State Bank of India, and other major banks have been installed. RailTel plans to open a cyber cafe in Ahmedabad Junction railway station.

=== Facilities ===
Ahmedabad Railway station has launched hand-push luggage trolley services at Ahmedabad railway station. Such trolleys are always available at airports, but for railway stations, it is a new initiative. The Railways will initially charge Rs 5 per luggage trolley from commuters. As of 2010, the service was available only for Platform no.1, but after new elevators and escalators become functional by the end of 2010, the trolley service would be introduced at all platforms of Ahmedabad railway station.

Recent days, IRCTC has launched its VIP class executive lounge on platform 1 for passengers to spend their waiting time on economy rates which offers free wifi, urinals, AC, news paper, recliners and foods.

== Redevelop of Ahmedabad railway station ==
The Ahmedabad Junction railway station, also known as Kalupur railway station, is undergoing a significant redevelopment led by the Delhi Metro Rail Corporation (DMRC) in collaboration with Dinesh chandra R Agrawal (DRA) Infracon.

This project, with an estimated cost of ₹2,400 crore, aims to transform the station into a modern transport hub, incorporating architectural elements inspired by local heritage, such as the Modhera Sun Temple and Adalaj Stepwell. The redesign plans include the construction of an open space Amphitheatre and architectural nods to the city's historical sites, aiming to enhance passenger amenities and preserve the station's cultural significance.

Expected to complete within 36 months, the project will introduce an elevated road network and a multi-modal transport facility, reflecting efforts to accommodate future traffic and passenger needs up to the year 2060. The redevelopment was officially initiated by Prime Minister Narendra Modi through a virtual ground-breaking ceremony on February 26. This effort represents a key infrastructure upgrade for Gujarat, seeking to balance modern requirements with heritage conservation.
