= Mumbai–Ahmedabad main line =

Railway route on the Western Railway

Overview
- Native name: मुंबई–अहमदाबाद मुख्य मार्ग
- Status: Operational
- Owner: Indian Railways
- Locale: Gujarat, Maharashtra
- Termini: Mumbai Central; Ahmedabad Junction

Service
- System: Electrified
- Operator: Western Railway

History
- Opened: 20 January 1863

Technical
- Line length: 493 km (306 mi)
- Number of tracks: 2
- Track gauge: 1,676 mm (5 ft 6 in) 5 ft 6 in (1,676 mm) broad gauge
- Electrification: 25 kV 50 Hz AC OHLE fully operational
- Operating speed: up to 160 km/h
Route map
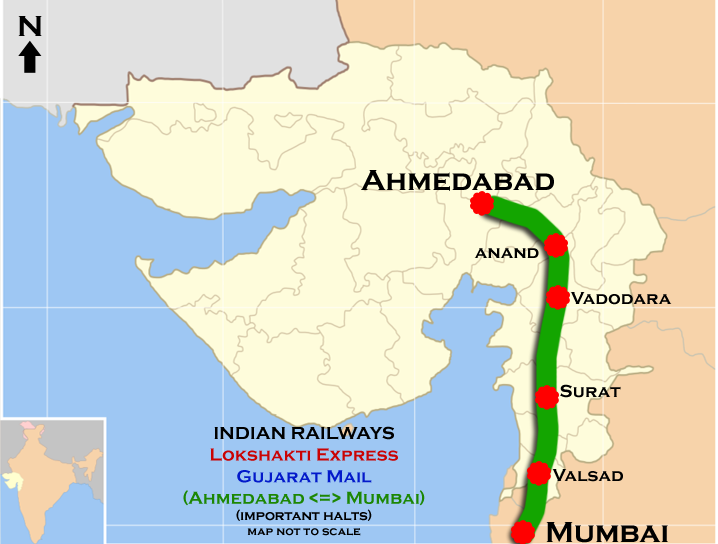
- ;Sources 59442/Ahmedabad–Mumbai Central Passenger 79428 Khambhat–Anand Passenger 59104 Kathana–Vadodara Passenger 59117 Vadodara–Chhota–Udepur Passenger 69196 Dahej–Bharuch MEMU 59168 Rajpipla–Ankleashwar Passenger

The Mumbai–Ahmedabad main line is a railway route on the Western Railway section of Indian Railways. It is one of the busiest railway routes of the Indian Railways and is fully electrified. The Western line of the Mumbai Suburban Railway operates on the southern part of this route.

The Ahmedabad–Mumbai corridor passes through some major industrial cities such as Vadodara, Bharuch, Surat, Ankleshwar, Vapi, Dahanu Road and Palghar. There are commutes daily and regularly between these industrial clusters for business and work. This makes the Ahmedabad–Mumbai line one of the most productive and beneficial for the public.

== Main lines branches ==
Currently, the Ahmedabad–Mumbai mainline consists of some branch lines which are totally on broad gauge, these are:

- Nadiad Junction–Modasa line with a length of 104 km. New line from Modasa-Udaipur is working
- Vadtal Swaminarayan–Kanjari Boriyavi Junction line with a length of 6 km.
- Khambhat–Anand Junction line with a length of 53 km.
- Godhra Junction–Anand Junction line with a length of 79 km.
- Kathana–Vasad Junction line with a length of 43 km.
- Vadodara Junction–Chhota Udepur line with a length of 105 km.
- Dahej–Bharuch Junction line with a length of 62 km.
- Rajpipla–Ankleshwar Junction line with a length of 63 km.

== History ==
- 1855: Bombay, Baroda and Central India Railway Company (BB&CI), incorporated by Act of British Parliament on 2 July, signs an agreement with British East India Company on 21 Nov to construct a railway line from Surat to Baroda and Ahmedabad.
- 1860: BB&CI's first section from Ankleshwar to Utran is inaugurated, and the Surat railway station was built; it was the first railway station in Asia to have a platform on the first floor (above ground level).
- 1862: Asia's first narrow-gauge line opened between Dabhoi and Miyagam (near Vadodara), and BB&CI introduces the world's first double-decker coaches.
- 1863: The first train is flagged off from Kalupur railway station in Ahmedabad to Surat on 20 January.
- 1864: BB&CI trains reach Bombay and run between Grant Road and Valsad.
- 1870: BBCI Railway runs direct trains between Ahmedabad and Bombay.
- 1901: The Anand–Tarapur branch line was inaugurated by the Petlad–Cambay Railway of BBCI.
- 1917: The Ankleshwar–Rajpipla branch line was inaugurated by the Rajpipla State Railway of BBCI.
- 1929: The Vadtal–Kanjari Boriyavi Branch line was inaugurated by the Boriyavi–Vadtal Railway of BBCI.
- 1930: The Vasad–Kathana Branch line was inaugurated by the Vasad–Katana Railway of BBCI.
- 1974: Virar Ahmedabad sector was AC electrified since 1973–74 in phases.
- 1987: The electrified Delhi–Vadodara route was commissioned by Western Railways.

== Trains ==
The following trains serve this line:

=== Runs only on this route ===
Train name	Train no	Starts	End
Ahmedabad–Mumbai Central Vande Bharat Express	22962/61	Ahmedabad	Mumbai Central
Mumbai Central–Gandhinagar Capital Vande Bharat Express	20901/02	Mumbai Central	Ahmedabad Gandhinagar
Ahmedabad–Mumbai Central Tejas Express	82901/02	Ahmedabad	Mumbai Central
Mumbai Central–Ahmedabad Shatabdi Express	12009/10	Mumbai Central	Ahmedabad
Gujarat Express	22953/54	Mumbai Central	Ahmedabad
Karnavati Express	12934/33	Ahmedabad	Mumbai Central
Gujarat Mail	12901/02	Mumbai Central	Ahmedabad
Sankalp Fast Passenger	59550/49	Ahmedabad Vatva	Vadodara
Mumbai Central–Ahmedabad Passenger	59439/40	Mumbai Central	Ahmedabad
Mumbai Central–Ahmedabad Passenger	59441/42	Mumbai Central	Ahmedabad
Flying Ranee	12921/22	Mumbai Central	Surat
Vadodara Express	12927/28	Mumbai Central	Vadodara
Mumbai Central–Valsad Fast Passenger	59023/24	Mumbai Central	Valsad
Lok Shakti Express	22927/28	Mumbai Bandra (T)	Ahmedabad
Bandra Terminus–Vapi Passenger	59045/46	Mumbai Bandra (T)	Vapi/Valsad
Bandra Terminus–Surat Intercity Express	12935/36	Mumbai Bandra (T)	Surat
Dahanu Road–Vadodara Superfast Express	22929/30	Bhilad	Vadodara
Gujarat Queen	19034/33	Ahmedabad	Valsad
Vadodara–Ahmedabad Intercity Express	19035/36	Vadodara	Ahmedabad
Mumbai Central–Ahmedabad Double Decker Express	12931/32	Ahmedabad	Mumbai Central

=== Starts from Mumbai, Valsad, Surat and Ahmedabad ===
Train name	Train no	Starts	End	Via on this route
Paschim Superfast Express	12925/26	Mumbai Bandra (T)	Amritsar	Vadodara
August Kranti Rajdhani Express	12953/54	Mumbai Central	Delhi Hazrat Nizamuddin	Vadodara
Ranakpur Express	14707/08	Bikaner	Mumbai Bandra (T)	Ahmedabad
Firozpur Janata Express	19023/24	Mumbai Central	Firozpur	Vadodara
Mumbai Central–New Delhi Tejas Rajdhani Express	12951/52	Mumbai Central	New Delhi	Vadodara
Mumbai Central–Hapa Duronto Express	12267/68	Mumbai Central	Rajkot	Ahmedabad
Bandra Terminus–Haridwar Express	19019/20	Mumbai Bandra (T)	Dehradun	Vadodara
Kutch Express	19131/32	Mumbai Bandra (T)	Bhuj	Ahmedabad
Aravali Express	19707/08	Mumbai Bandra (T)	Jaipur	Ahmedabad
Golden Temple Mail	12903/04	Mumbai Central	Amritsar	Vadodara
Suryanagri Express	12479/80	Jodhpur	Mumbai Bandra (T)	Ahmedabad
Saurashtra Janata Express	19017/18	Mumbai Bandra (T)	Jamnagar	Ahmedabad
Saurashtra Express	12915/16	Mumbai Central	Porbandar	Ahmedabad
Saurashtra Mail	19005/06	Mumbai Central	Okha	Ahmedabad
Avantika Superfast Express	12961/62	Mumbai Central	Indore	Vadodara
Sayajinagari Express	19115/16	Mumbai Bandra (T)	Bhuj	Ahmedabad
Dadar–Ajmer Superfast Express	12989/90	Mumbai Dadar	Ajmer	Ahmedabad
Dadar–Bhuj Superfast Express	12959/60	Bhuj	Mumbai Dadar	Ahmedabad
Shri Ganganagar–Dadar Superfast Express	12489/90	Bikaner	Mumbai Dadar	Ahmedabad
Maharashtra Sampark Kranti Express	12907/08	Mumbai Bandra (T)	Delhi Hazrat Nizmuddin	Vadodara
Yuva Express	12247/48	Mumbai Bandra (T)	Delhi Hazrat Nizmuddin	Vadodara
Jaipur Superfast Express	12955/56	Mumbai Central	Jaipur	Vadodara
Jaipur–Bandra Terminus Superfast Express	22933/34	Mumbai Bandra (T)	Jaipur	Vadodara
Ajmer–Bandra Terminus Express	22995/96	Mumbai Bandra (T)	Ajmer	Vadodara
Bandra Terminus–Udaipur Superfast Express	22901/02	Mumbai Bandra (T)	Udaipur	Vadodara
Swaraj Express	12471/72	Mumbai Bandra (T)	Jammu Tawi	Vadodara
Mumbai Central–Hisar Duronto Express	12239/40	Mumbai Central	Jaipur	*Vadodara
Mumbai Central–Indore Duronto Express	12227/28	Mumbai Central	Indore	*Vadodara
Mumbai Central–New Delhi Duronto Express	22209/10	Mumbai Central	New Delhi	*Vadodara
Bandra Terminus–Bhavnagar Terminus Express	12971/72	Mumbai Bandra (T)	Bhavnagar	Ahmedabad
Avadh Express	19037/38	Mumbai Bandra (T)	Gorakhpur	Vadodara
Avadh Express	19039/40	Mumbai Bandra (T)	Muzaffarpur	Vadodara
Garib Rath Express	12215/16	Delhi Sarai Rohilla	Mumbai Bandra (T)	Ahmedabad
Vivek Express	19027/28	Mumbai Bandra (T)	Jammu Tawi	Ahmedabad
AC Superfast Express	22903/04	Mumbai Bandra (T)	Bhuj	Ahmedabad
Bandra Terminus–Saharsa Humsafar Express	22913/14	Mumbai Central	New Delhi	Vadodara
Delhi Sarai Rohilla Express	19029/30	Mumbai Bandra (T)	Delhi Sarai Rohilla	Ahmedabad
Jodhpur Express	19065/66	Mumbai Bandra (T)	Bhagat Ki Kothi (Jodhpur)	Ahmedabad
Jhansi Express	11103/04	Jhansi	Mumbai Bandra (T)	Vadodara
Patna Express	19049/50	Mumbai Bandra (T)	Patna	Udhna Junction
Chandigarh Express	22451/52	Mumbai Bandra (T)	Chandigarh	Ahmedabad
Gandhidham Express	19451/52	Mumbai Bandra (T)	Gandhidham	Ahmedabad
Haridwar Express	22917/18	Mumbai Bandra (T)	Haridwar	Vadodara
Valsad–Dahod Intercity Express	12929/30	Valsad	Dahod	Vadodara
Valsad–Jodhpur Weekly Express	19055/56	Valsad	Jodhpur	Ahmedabad
Udyog Karmi Express	12943/44	Valsad	Kanpur	Udhna Junction
Valsad Haridwar Express	12911/12	Valsad	Haridwar	Vadodara
Shramik Express	19051/52	Valsad	Muzaffarpur	Udhna Junction
Valsad–Puri Superfast Express	22909/10	Valsad	Puri	Vadodara
Surat–Muzaffarpur Express	19053/54	Surat	Muzaffarpur	Vadodara
Vadodara–Jamnagar Intercity Superfast Express	22959/60	Surat	Jamnagar	Ahmedabad
Tapti Ganga Express	19051/52	Surat	Bhagalpur	Udhna Junction
Surat–Malda Town Express	13245/46	Surat	Malda Town	Udhna Junction
Tapti Ganga Express	19045/46	Surat	Chhapra	Udhna Junction
Udhna–Varanasi Express	19057/58	Udhna Junction	Varanasi	Udhna Junction
Gujarat Sampark Kranti Express	12917/18	Ahmedabad	Delhi Hazrat Nizamuddin	Vadodara
Sabarmati Express	19165/66	Ahmedabad	Darbhanga	Vadodara
Ahmedabad–Varanasi City Sabarmati Express	19167/68	Ahmedabad	Varanasi	Vadodara
Navjeevan Express	12655/56	Ahmedabad	Chennai Central	Udhna Junction
Howrah–Ahmedabad Superfast Express	12833/34	Ahmedabad	Howrah	Udhna Junction
Prerana Express	22137/38	Ahmedabad	Nagpur	Udhna Junction
Ahimsa Express	11095/96	Ahmedabad	Pune	Vasai Road
Ahmedabad–Pune Duronto Express	12297/98	Ahmedabad	Pune	*Vasai Road
Puri–Ahmedabad Express	12843/44	Puri	Ahmedabad	Udhna Junction
Chennai Central−Ahmedabad Express	19419/20	Chennai Central	Ahmedabad	Vasai Road
Navjeevan Express	12655/56	Ahmedabad	Chennai Central	Udhna Junction
Azimabad Express	12947/48	Ahmedabad	Patna	Vadodara
Ahmedabad–SCSMT Kolhapur Express	11049/50	Ahmedabad	Kolhapur CSMT	Vasai Road

- * Technical stops

=== Trains run through this route ===
Train name	Train no	Starts	End	Via on this route S/E
Okha–Tuticorin Vivek Express	15967/68	Tuticorin	Okha	Vasai Road–Ahmedabad
Rajkot–Coimbatore Express	16613/14	Rajkot	Coimbatore	Vasai Road–Ahmedabad
Rajkot–Secunderabad Express	17017/18	Rajkot	Secunderabad	Vasai Road–Ahmedabad
Tirunelveli–Jamnagar Express	19577/78	Tirunelveli	Jamnagar	Vasai Road–Ahmedabad
Mysuru–Ajmer Express	16209/10	Ajmer	Mysore	Vasai Road–Ahmedabad
Thiruvananthapuram–Veraval Express	16333/34	Veraval	Thiruvananthapuram	Vasai Road–Ahmedabad
Madgaon–Hapa Superfast Express	22907/08	Madgaon	Hapa	Vasai Road–Ahmedabad
Hazrat Nizamuddin–Pune Duronto Express	12263/64	Pune	Delhi Hazrat Nizamuddin	Vasai Road–Vadodara
Hazrat Nizamuddin–Thiruvananthapuram Rajdhani Express	12431/32	Thiruvananthapuram	Delhi Hazrat Nizamuddin	Vasai Road - Vadodara
Goa Sampark Kranti Express	12449/50	Madgaon	Chandigarh	Vasai Road - Vadodara
Kerala Sampark Kranti Express	12217/18	Kochuveli (Thiruvananthapuram)	Chandigarh	Vasai Road - Vadodara
Marusagar Express	12977/78	Ernakulam	Ajmer	Vasai Road - Vadodara
Yesvantpur–Barmer AC Express	14805/06	Yeshvantapur	Barmer	Vasai Road - Ahmedabad
Indore–Pune Express	19311/12	Indore	Pune	Vasai Road - Vadodara
Somnath–Jabalpur Express (via Itarsi)	11463/64	Somnath	Jabalpur	Vadodara - Ahmedabad
Somnath–Jabalpur Express (via Bina)	11465/66	Somnath	Jabalpur	Vadodara - Ahmedabad
Parasnath Express	12941/42	Bhavnagar	Asansol	Vadodara - Ahmedabad
Shanti Express	19309/10	Gandhinagar	Indore	Vadodara - Ahmedabad
Shalimar–Bhuj Weekly Superfast Express	22829/30	Bhuj	Kolkata Shalimar	Vadodara - Ahmedabad
Dwarka Express	15635/36	Okha	Guwahati	Vadodara - Ahmedabad
Gandhidham–Puri Express (via Vizianagaram)	19453/54	Gandhidham	Puri	Udhna Junction - Ahmedabad
Garba Superfast Express	12937/38	Gandhidham	Howrah	Vadodara - Ahmedabad
Hisar–Coimbatore AC Superfast Express	22475/76	Bikaner	Coimbatore	Vasai Road - Ahmedabad
Visakhapatnam–Gandhidham Express	18501/02	Visakhapatnam	Gandhidham	Udhna Junction - Ahmedabad
Kaviguru Express	12949/50	Porbandar	Santragachi (Kolkata)	Udhna Junction - Ahmedabad
Shalimar–Porbandar Superfast Express	12905/06	Porbandar	Howrah	Udhna Junction - Ahmedabad

== Speed limits ==
Most of the Ahmedabad–Mumbai mainline is classified as 'A' class line where trains can run up to 160 km per hour but in certain sections speeds may be limited from 100 kmph to 110 kmph

Station	Maximum operational speed
Mumbai Central to Borivali	100 kmpl
Borivali to Virar	110 kmpl
Virar to Ahmedabad	160 kmpl
