= Karnavati Express =

Train in India

Karnavati Superfast Express
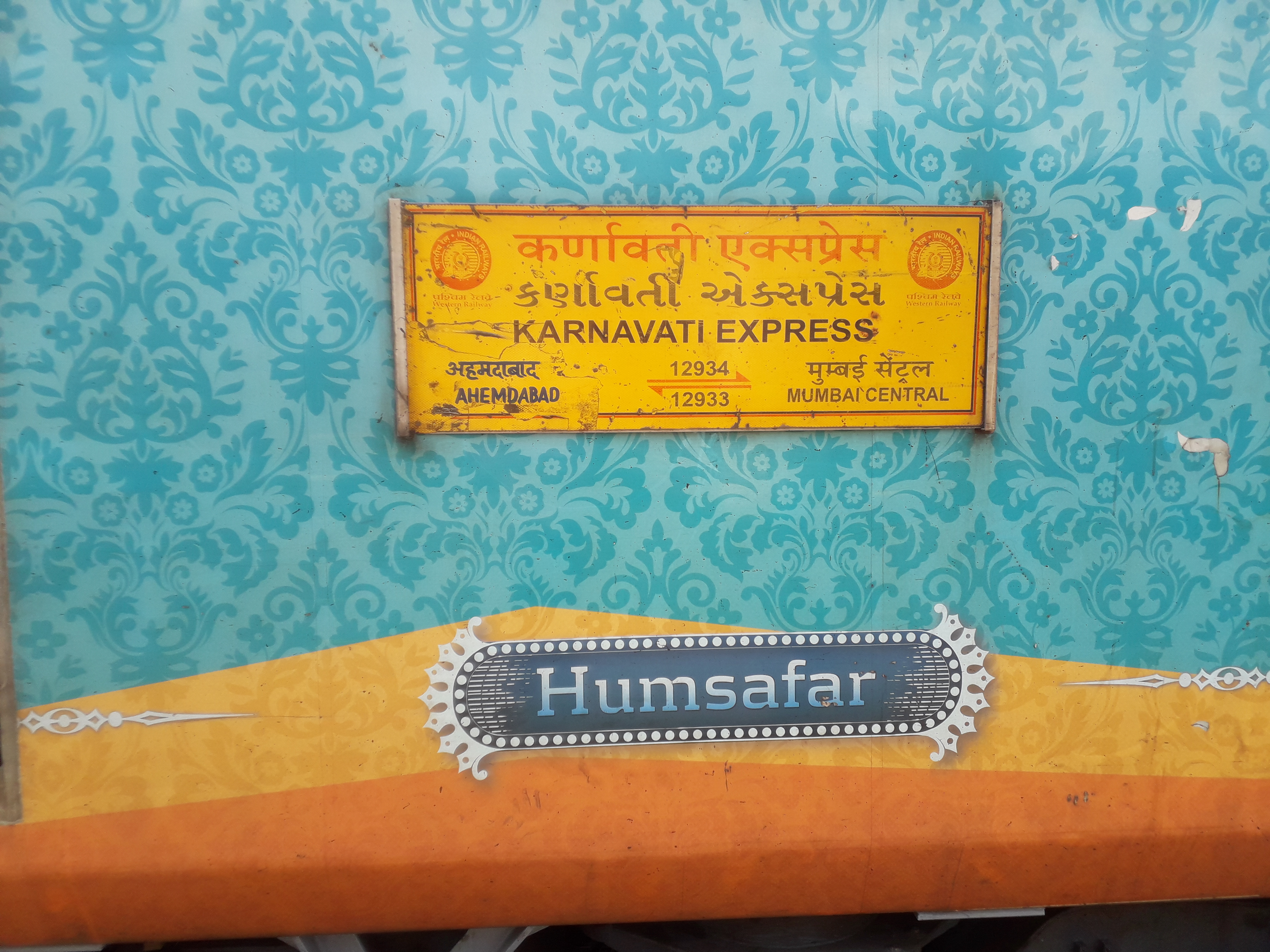

Overview
- Service type: Superfast Express
- Locale: Gujarat & Maharashtra
- First service: 1 July 1991; 35 years ago
- Current operator: Western Railway

Route
- Termini: Ahmedabad Junction (ADI); Bandra Terminus (BDTS)
- Stops: 11
- Distance travelled: 481 km (299 mi)
- Average journey time: 7 hours 45 minutes
- Service frequency: Daily
- Train number: 12933 / 12934

On-board services
- Classes: AC Chair Car, Second Class Seating, General Unreserved
- Seating arrangements: Yes
- Sleeping arrangements: No
- Auto-rack arrangements: Overhead racks
- Catering facilities: Available
- Observation facilities: Large windows
- Baggage facilities: Available
- Other facilities: Below the seats

Technical
- Rolling stock: LHB coach
- Track gauge: 1,676 mm (5 ft 6 in)
- Operating speed: 64 km/h (40 mph) average including halts.
Route map
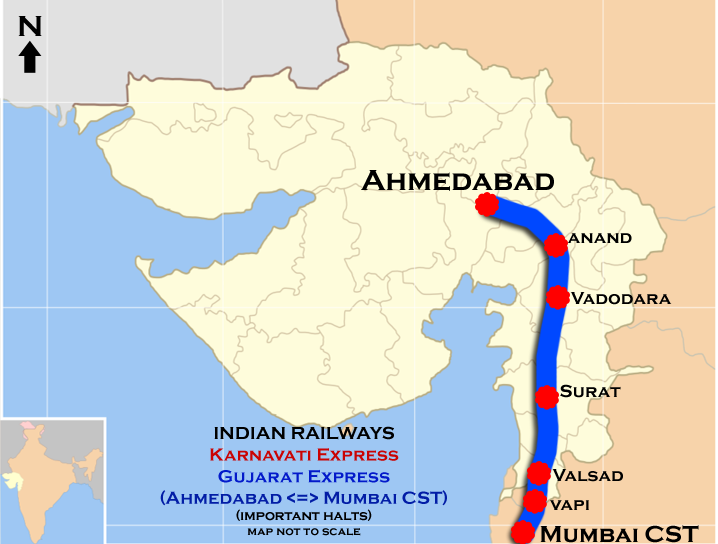

The 12933 / 12934 Karnavati Superfast Express is one of four express trains belonging to Indian Railways that offer Chair Car services between Ahmedabad Junction (ADI) and Bandra Terminus (BDTS) in India. It operates as train number 12934 from Ahmedabad Junction to Bandra Terminus and as train number 12933 in the reverse direction, serving the states of Maharashtra & Gujarat.

The other Chair Car trains which run between the two cities are 12931/32 Mumbai Central–Ahmedabad Double Decker Express, 22953/54 Gujarat Superfast Express and the 12009/10 Mumbai Central–Ahmedabad Shatabdi Express.

Karnavati was the name of a city that existed where Ahmedabad stands today. That was before the Mughal period.

== Coaches ==
Karnavati Superfast Express is composed of four AC Chair Cars, 14 2nd Class seating cars, 2 General Unreserved coaches, 1 Pantry car and two 2 Luggage Cum Generator coaches. The conventional rakes were replaced by Linke-Hofmann Busch (LHB) coaches for this train in 2014.

As with most train services in India, coach composition may be amended at the discretion of Indian Railways depending on demand.

== Service ==
- 12934 Karnavati Superfast Express covers the distance of 491 kilometres in 7 hours 40 mins (at an average speed of 64.04 km/h).
- The reverse trip, as 12933 Karnavati Superfast Express needs 7 hours 45 mins (at an average speed of 63.35 km/h).

As the average speed of the train is more than 55 km/h, its fare includes a Superfast surcharge.

== Traction ==
Prior to Western Railways switching over to the AC system in February 2012, dual-traction WCAM-1 or WCAM-2/2P and WAG-5H locos would haul the train.

Since Western Railway has switched over to the AC system it is hauled from end to end by a Vadodara Loco Shed-based WAP-5 / WAP-7 or Valsad Loco Shed-based WAP-4 electric locomotive.

== Time table ==
- 12934 Karnavati Superfast Express leaves Ahmedabad Junction at 05:00 AM IST every day and reaches Bandra Terminus at 12:30 PM IST the same day.
- 12933 Karnavati Superfast Express leaves Bandra Terminus at 13:55 PM IST every day and reaches Vatva in Ahmedabad at 20:50 PM IST the same day.

== Route & halts ==
- Ahmedabad junction
- Nadiad junction
- Anand junction
- Vadodara junction
- Bharuch junction
- Surat
- Navsari
- Valsad
- Vapi
- Borivali
- Mumbai Bandra Terminus

Note:- No Halt for Ahmedabad junction as 12933 Bandra Terminus End at Vatva railway station Ahmedabad Karnavati Superfast Express

== Gallery ==
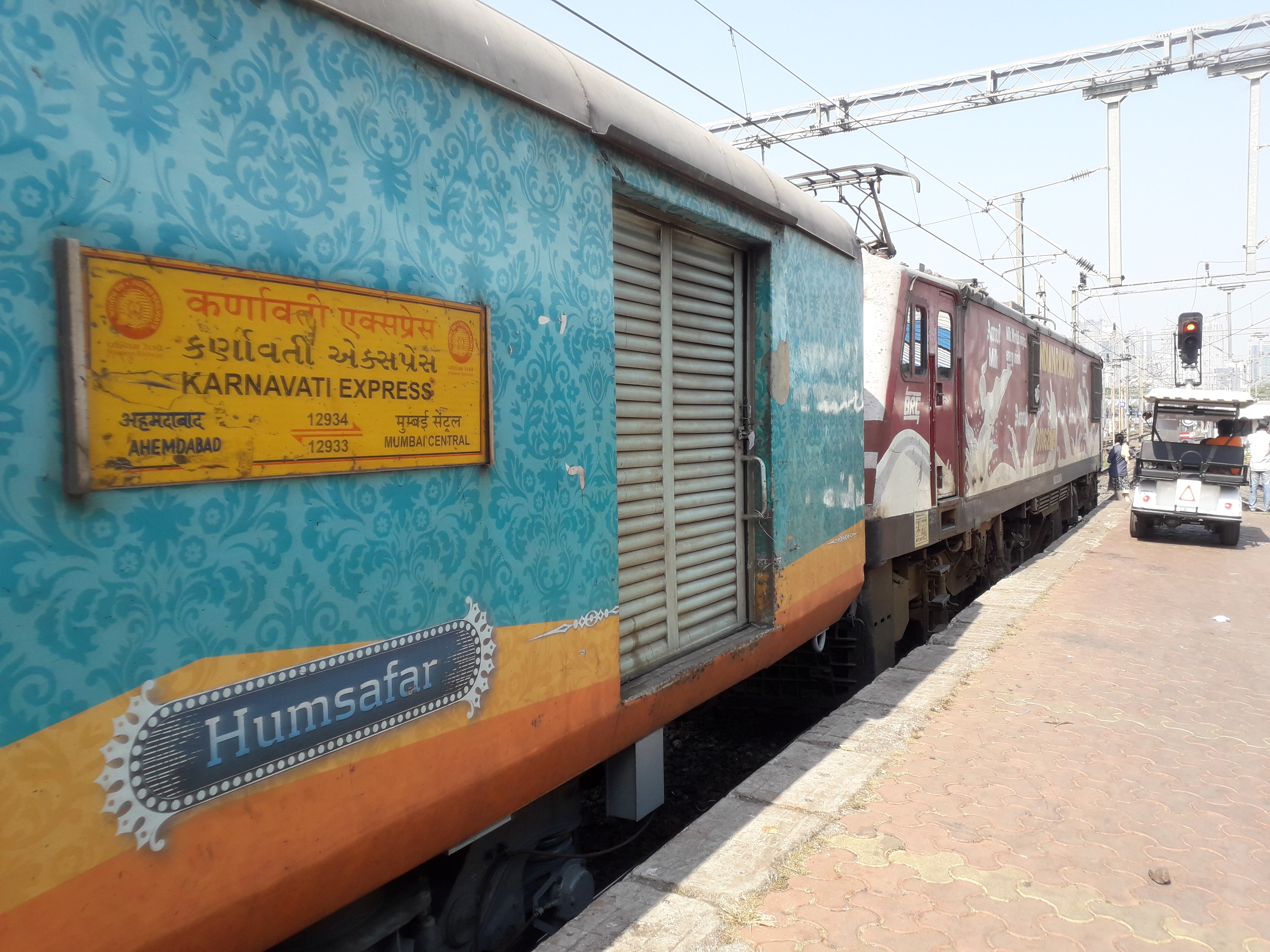
12933 Karnavati Superfast Express – with Amul WAP-5

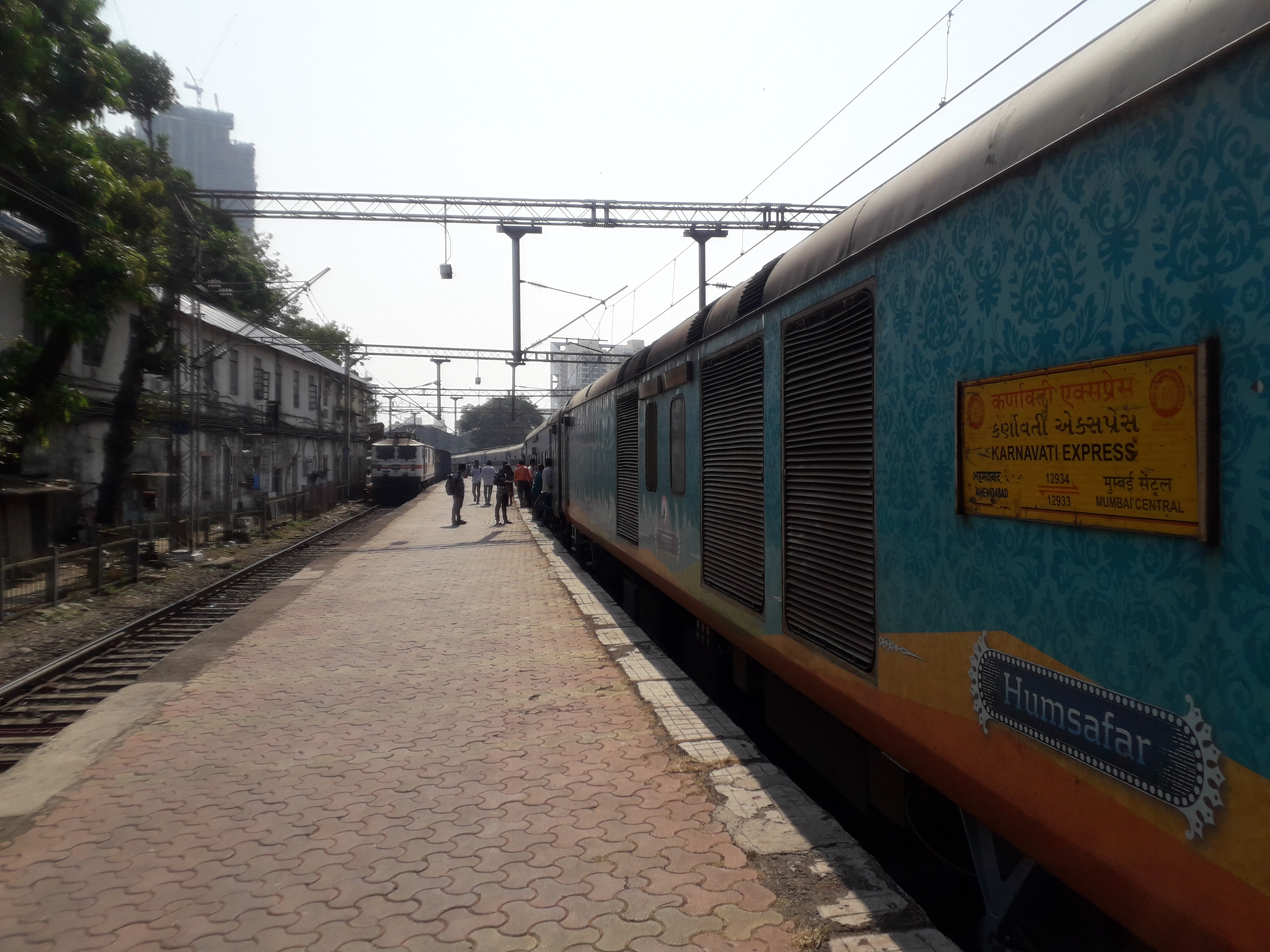
12933 Karnavati Superfast Express – at MMCT

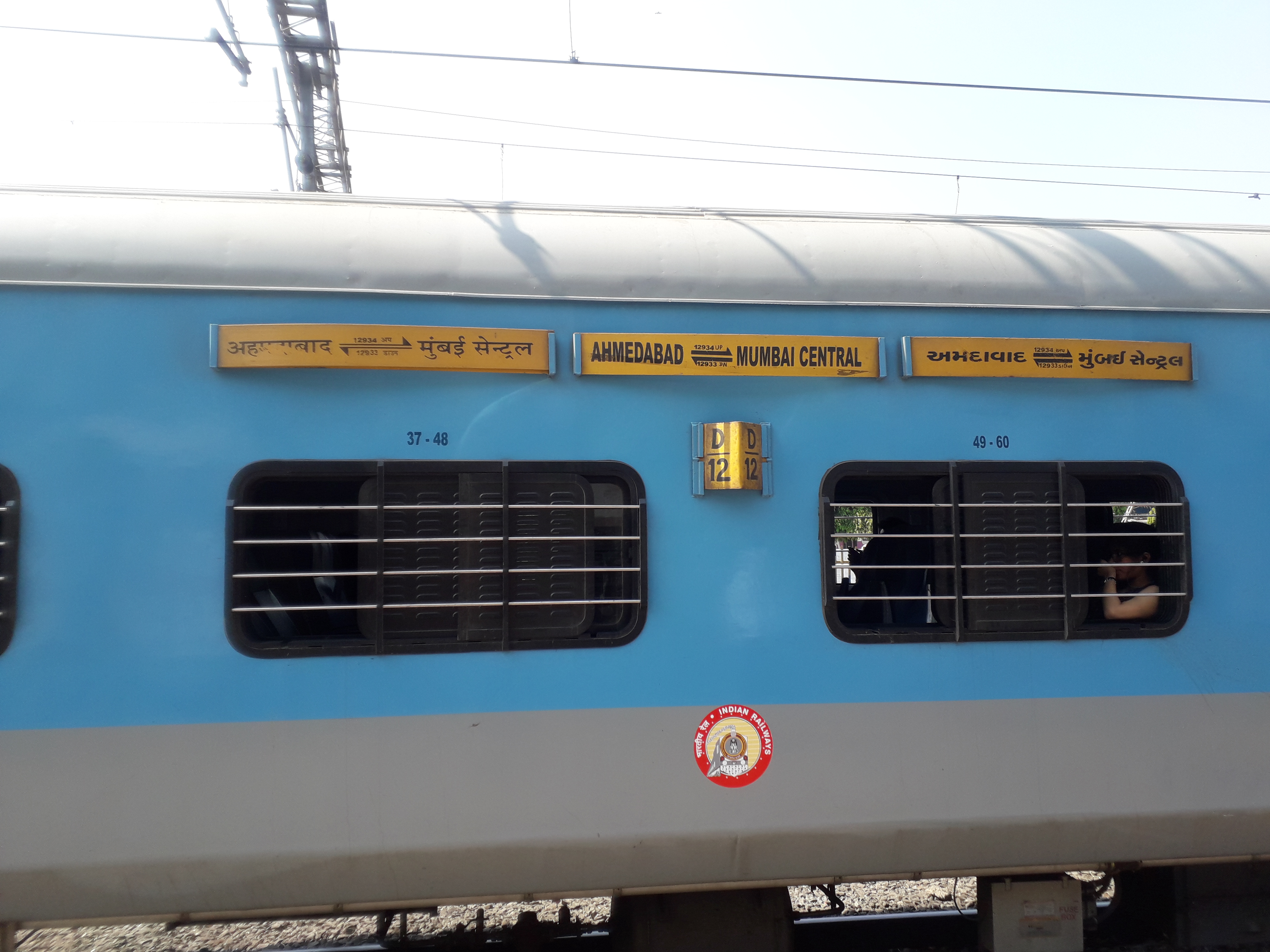
12933 Karnavati Superfast Express – 2nd Class seating

== Sister trains ==
- Gujarat Queen
- Gujarat Mail
- Mumbai Central–Ahmedabad Double Decker Express
- Mumbai Central–Ahmedabad Passenger
- Mumbai Central–Ahmedabad Shatabdi Express
