= Mumbai Central–Ahmedabad Double Decker Express =

Train in India

Mumbai Central – Ahmedabad Junction Double Decker Express
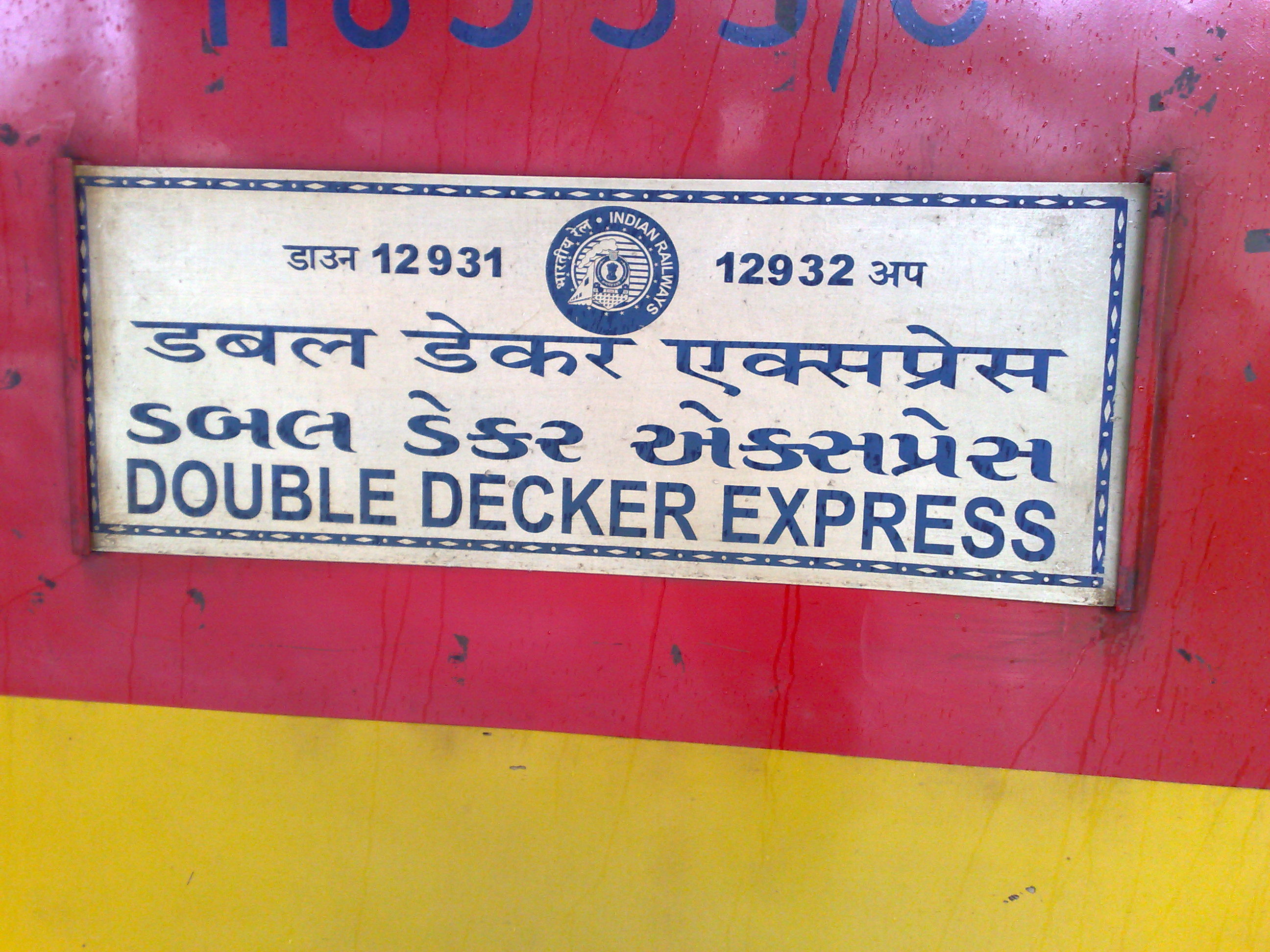

Overview
- Service type: Double Decker
- Locale: Maharashtra & Gujarat
- First service: 19 September 2012; 13 years ago
- Current operator: Western Railway

Route
- Termini: Mumbai Central (MMCT); Ahmedabad Junction (ADI)
- Stops: 9
- Distance travelled: 491 km (305 mi)
- Average journey time: 6 hours 55 minutes
- Service frequency: 6 days a week
- Train number: 12931 / 12932

On-board services
- Class: AC Chair Car
- Seating arrangements: Yes
- Sleeping arrangements: No
- Auto-rack arrangements: Overhead racks
- Catering facilities: On-board Catering, E-Catering
- Observation facilities: Large Windows
- Baggage facilities: Available

Technical
- Rolling stock: LHB Double Decker
- Track gauge: 1,676 mm (5 ft 6 in)
- Operating speed: 130 km/h (81 mph) maximum, 71 km/h (44 mph) average excluding halts.
Route map
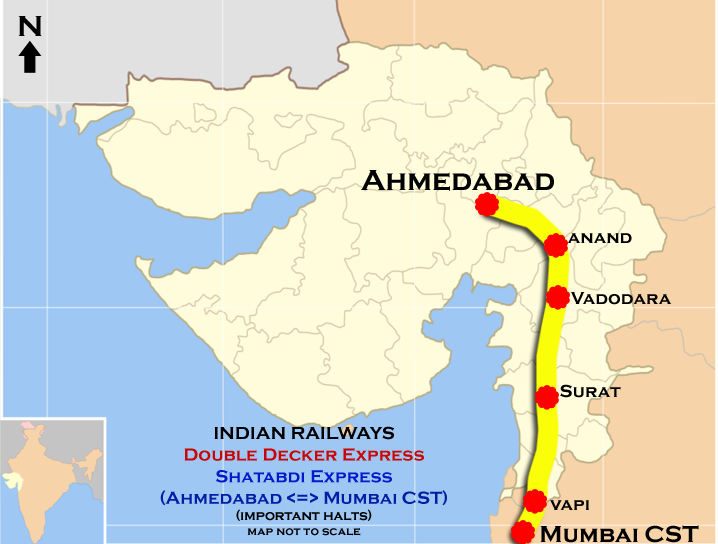

The 12931 / 12932 Mumbai Central–Ahmedabad Double Decker Express is a Double Decker Express train belonging to Indian Railways that runs between Mumbai Central (MMCT) and Ahmedabad Junction (ADI) in India. It runs 6 days in week except Sunday. It operates as train number 12931 from Mumbai Central to Ahmedabad Junction and as train number 12932 in the reverse direction.

On 20 March 2017, the exteriors of the train departing Mumbai Central were covered with vinyl wrapping advertisements becoming the Indian Railway's first "branded" train. The advertisements were for soap brand Savlon, as part of its Savlon Swasth India Mission, a social awareness initiative for promoting hand hygiene.

== Coach composition ==
The train has a rake consisting of 13 AC Chair Car and 2 EOG cars. As with most train services in India, coach composition may be amended depending on demand. And they pulled by WAP-7 and WAP-5 so was WAP-4

1	2	3	4	5	6	7	8	9	10	11	12	13	14	15	16
	EOG	C1	C2	C3	C4	C5	C6	C7	C8	C9	C10	C11	C12	C13	EOG

== Service ==
12931 / 12932 Mumbai Central - Ahmedabad Double Decker Express was first introduced on 19 September 2012.

It covers the distance of 491 kilometres in 6 hours 55 mins as 12931 Mumbai Central - Ahmedabad Double Decker Express and as 12932 Ahmedabad - Mumbai Central Double Decker Express (71 km/h).

== Gallery ==
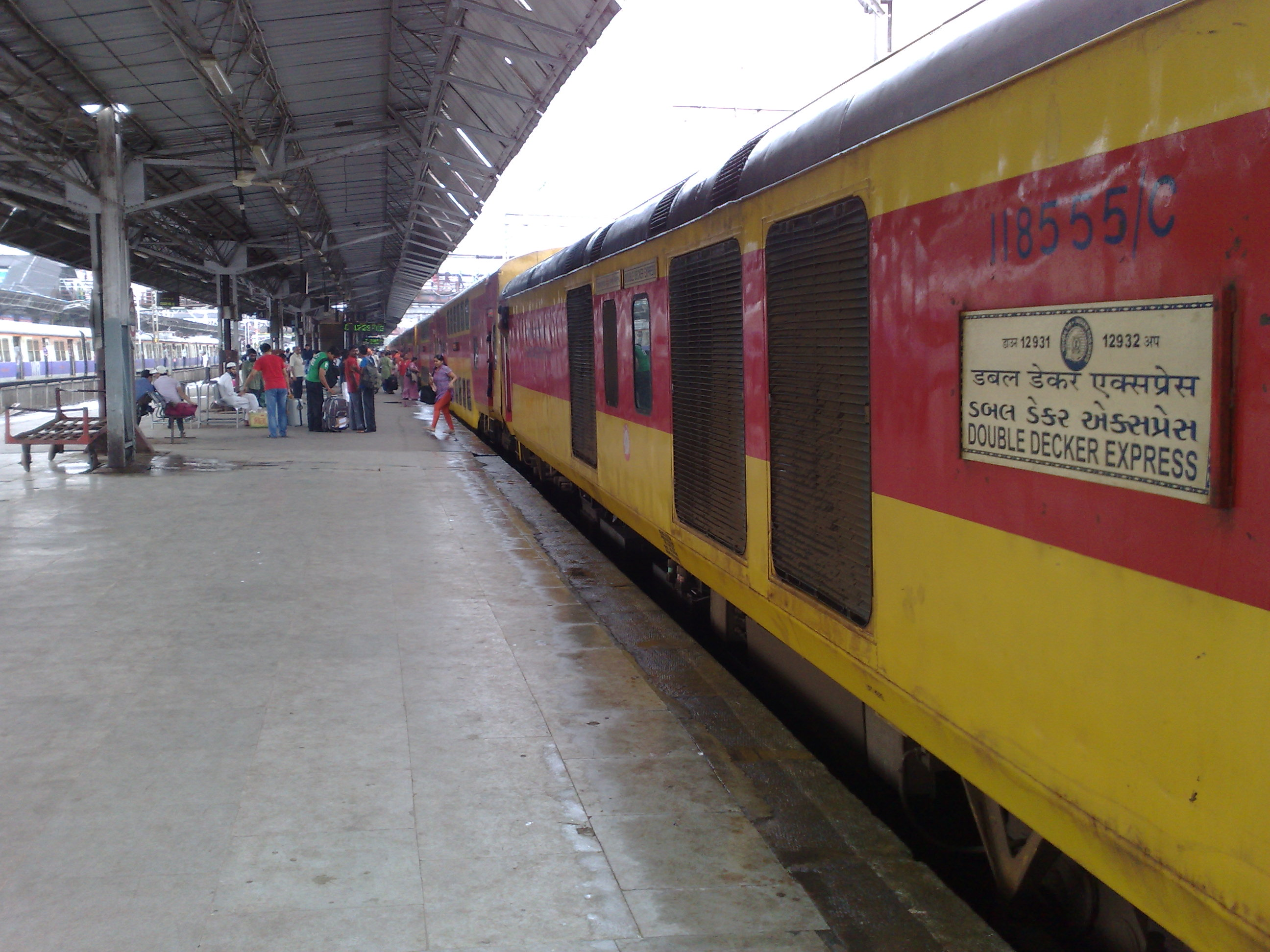
12932 Double Decker Express at Borivali

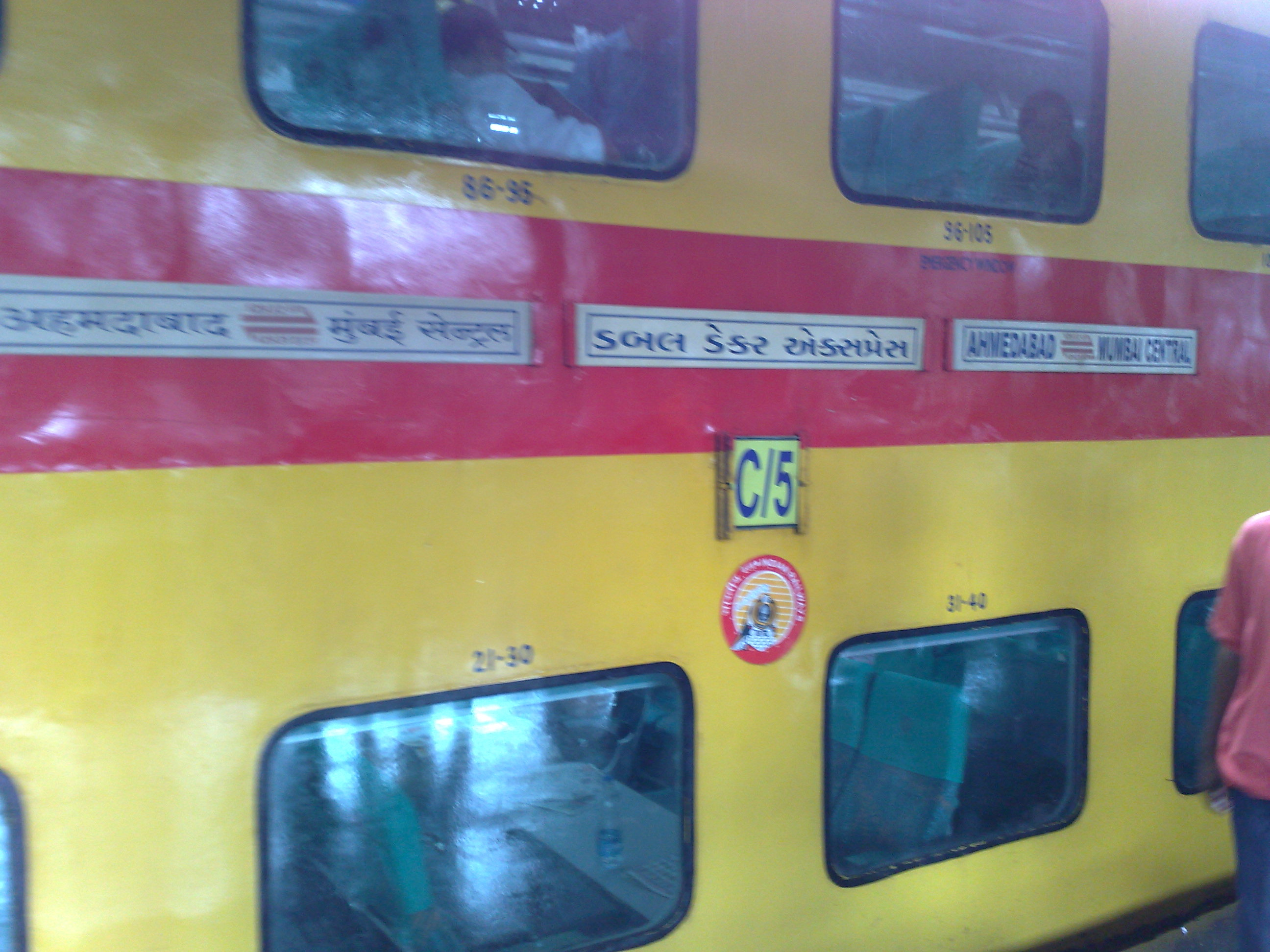
AC coach of 12932 Double Decker Express

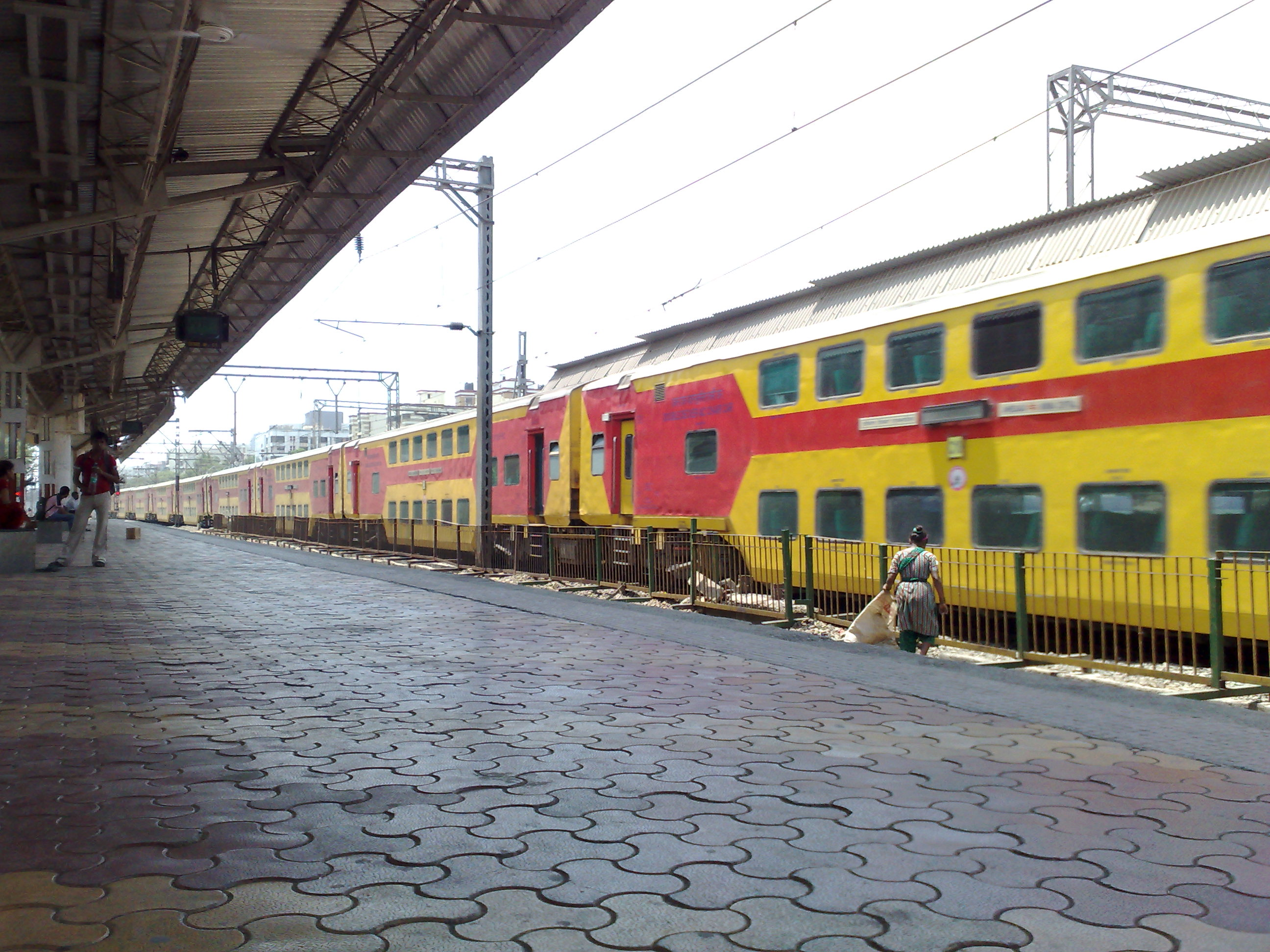
12932 Ahmedabad Mumbai Central Double Decker Express

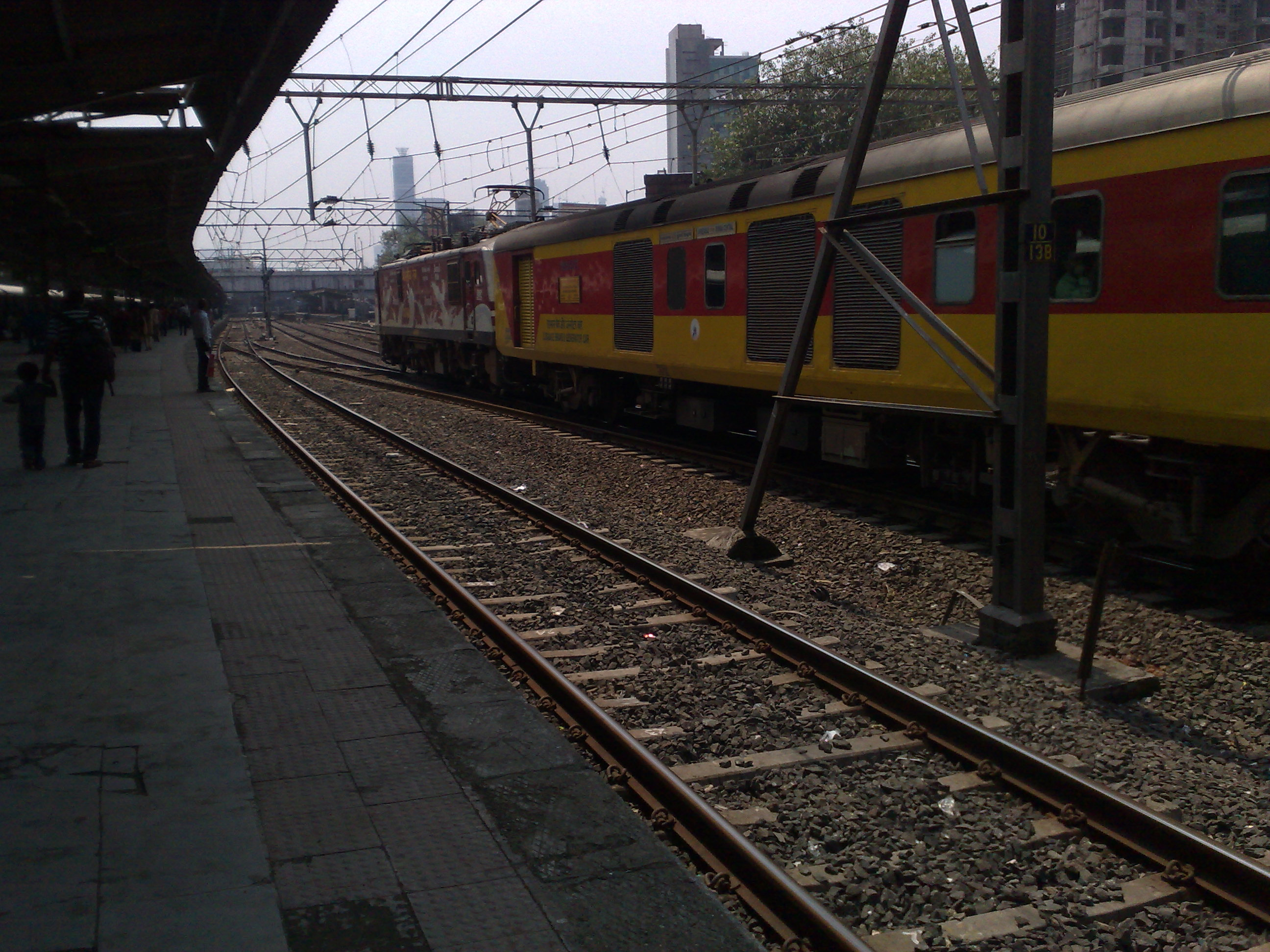
12932 Ahmedabad Mumbai Central Double Decker Express with a Vadodara based Amul WAP 5 engine.

== Sister trains ==
- Gujarat Queen
- Karnavati Express
- Mumbai Central - Ahmedabad Passenger
- Mumbai Central-Ahmedabad Shatabdi Express
