= Khambhalia railway station =

Railway station in Gujarat, India

General information
- Location: Khambhalia, Gujarat; India
- Coordinates: 22°13′01″N 69°39′21″E
- Elevation: 46 metres (151 ft)
- System: Indian Railways station
- Owner: Ministry of Railways, Indian Railways
- Operator: Western Railway
- Line: Viramgam–Okha line
- Platforms: 2
- Tracks: 2

Construction
- Structure type: Standard (on ground)
- Parking: No

Other information
- Status: Functioning
- Station code: KMBL
- Zone(s): Western Railway
- Division(s): Rajkot
Location
- Location within India Location within Gujarat

Khambhalia railway station is a railway station on the Western Railway network in the state of Gujarat, India. Khambhalia railway station is 54 km far away from Jamnagar railway station. Passenger, MEMU, Express and Superfast trains halt at Khambhalia railway station.

== Nearby stations ==
Viramdad is nearest railway station towards Okha, whereas Sinhan is nearest railway station towards Jamnagar.

== Major trains ==
Following Express/Superfast trains halt at Khambhalia railway station in both direction:

- 15635/36 Dwarka Express
- 15045/46 Gorakhpur–Okha Express
- 19567/68 Okha–Tuticorin Vivek Express
- 16337/38 Ernakulam–Okha Express
- 19251/52 Somnath–Okha Express
- 22969/70 Okha–Varanasi Superfast Express
- 22905/06 Okha–Howrah Link Express
- 16733/34 Rameswaram–Okha Express
- 19575/76 Okha–Nathdwara Express
- 18401/02 Puri–Okha Dwarka Express
- 19565/66 Uttaranchal Express
- 19573/74 Okha–Jaipur Weekly Express
- 22945/46 Saurashtra Mail

== See also ==
- Devbhumi Dwarka district
