= Dwarka railway station =

Railway station in Gujarat, India

Dwarka
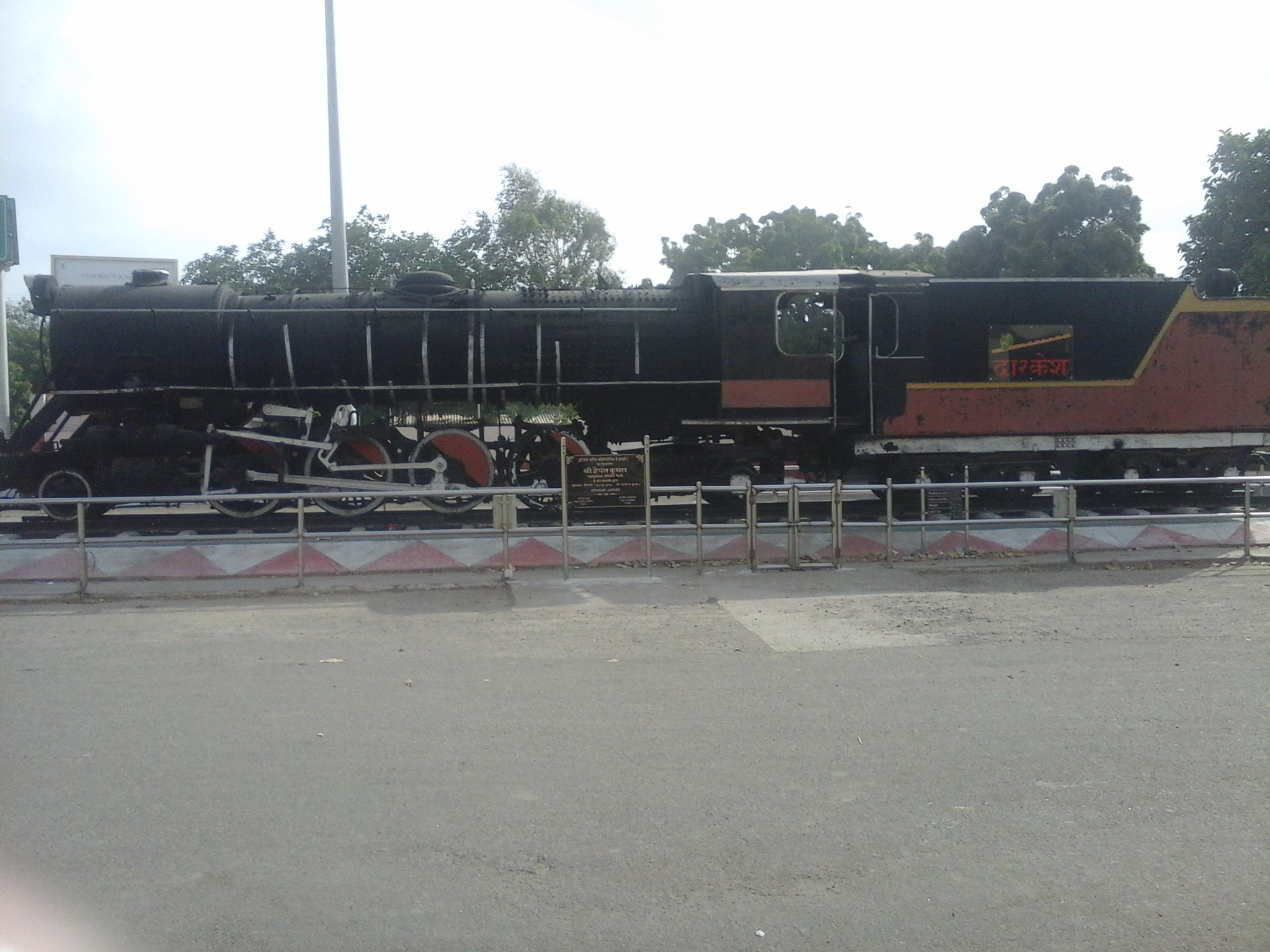
- One of the oldest steam engine of India displayed at station's entrance

General information
- Location: Dwarka, Gujarat; India
- Coordinates: 22°14′59″N 68°58′52″E
- Elevation: 14 metres (46 ft)
- System: Indian Railways station
- Owner: Indian Railways
- Operator: Western Railway
- Line: Viramgam–Okha line
- Platforms: 2
- Tracks: 4
- Connections: Auto stand

Construction
- Structure type: Standard (on-ground station)
- Parking: Available
- Cycle facilities: No

Other information
- Status: Functioning
- Station code: DWK
- Zone(s): Western Railway
- Division(s): Rajkot

History
- Opened: 1922; 104 years ago

Services
Preceding station	Indian Railways	Following station
Khambhalia towards Kanalus Junction	Western Railway zone	Mithapur towards Okha
Route map
- Source:Google Maps; 59503 Viramgam–Okha Passenger
Location
- Location within India Location within Gujarat
- Interactive Map

Dwarka railway station is a railway station in the city of Dwarka, Gujarat. The station has two platforms. It is one of the most important and busiest railway stations in Saurashtra. The station is currently the westernmost active railway station of Indian Railways.

== History ==
Dwarka was first connected on a Metre-gauge line which opened for traffic in 1922 by Jamnagar & Dwarka Railway. Later Jamnagar & Dwarka Railway was merged into Saurashtra Railway in April 1948. Later it was undertaken by Western Railway. Gauge conversion of the Hapa–Okha section was later completed in 1984 by Indian Railways.

== Major trains ==
Following Express/Superfast trains halt at Dwarka railway station in both direction:

- 15635/36 Dwarka Express
- 15045/46 Gorakhpur–Okha Express
- 19567/68 Okha–Tuticorin Vivek Express
- 16337/38 Ernakulam–Okha Express
- 19251/52 Somnath–Okha Express
- 22969/70 Okha–Varanasi Superfast Express
- 22905/06 Okha–Howrah Link Express
- 16733/34 Rameswaram–Okha Express
- 19575/76 Okha–Nathdwara Express
- 18401/02 Puri–Okha Dwarka Express
- 19565/66 Uttaranchal Express
- 19573/74 Okha–Jaipur Weekly Express
- 22945/46 Saurashtra Mail

== See also ==
- Jamnagar & Dwarka Railway
- Western Railway
- Somnath railway station
- Veraval Junction railway station
