= Bhatiya railway station =

Railway station in Gujarat, India

General information
- Location: Bhatiya, Gujarat; India
- Coordinates: 22°05′19″N 69°16′54″E
- Elevation: 33 metres (108 ft)
- System: Indian Railway Station
- Owner: Ministry of Railways, Indian Railways
- Operator: Western Railway
- Line: Viramgam–Okha line
- Platforms: 2
- Tracks: 2

Construction
- Structure type: Standard (On Ground)
- Parking: No

Other information
- Status: Functioning
- Station code: BHTA
- Zone(s): Western Railway
- Division(s): Rajkot
Location
- Location within India Location within Gujarat

Bhatiya railway station is a railway station on the Western Railway network in the state of Gujarat, India. Bhatiya railway station is 42 km far away from Khambhalia railway station. Passenger, Express and Superfast trains halt at Bhatiya railway station.

== Major trains ==
Following Express/Superfast trains halt at Bhatiya railway station in both directions:

- 19251/52 Okha - Somnath Express
- 16733/34 Okha - Rameswaram Express
- 22945/46 Okha - Mumbai Central Saurashtra Mail
- 19565/66 Okha - Dehradun Uttaranchal Express

== See also ==
- Devbhumi Dwarka district
