= Aliyavada railway station =

Railway station in Gujarat, India

General information
- Location: Aliyavada, Jamnagar district India
- Coordinates: 22°26′48″N 70°12′44″E
- Elevation: 27 metres (89 ft)
- System: Indian Railway Station
- Owner: Ministry of Railways, Indian Railways
- Operator: Western Railway
- Line: Viramgam–Okha line
- Platforms: 1
- Tracks: 1

Construction
- Structure type: Standard (On Ground)
- Parking: No

Other information
- Status: Functioning
- Station code: ALB
- Zone(s): Western Railway
- Division(s): Rajkot
Location
- Location within India Location within Gujarat

Aliyavada railway station is a railway station on the Western Railway network in the state of Gujarat, India. Aliyavada railway station is 19 km far away from Jamnagar railway station. Passenger and Superfast trains halt at Aliyavada railway station.

== Nearby stations ==
Hapa is nearest railway station towards Okha, whereas Jamwanthali is nearest railway station towards Rajkot Junction.

== Trains ==
The following Superfast train halts at Aliyavada railway station in both directions:

- 22945/46 Okha - Mumbai Central Saurashtra Mail

== See also ==
- Jamnagar district
