= Paddhari railway station =

Railway station in Gujarat, India

General information
- Location: Paddhari, Gujarat; India
- Coordinates: 22°25′47″N 70°36′21″E
- Elevation: 70 metres (230 ft)
- System: Indian Railway Station
- Owner: Ministry of Railways, Indian Railways
- Operator: Western Railway
- Line: Viramgam–Okha line
- Platforms: 1
- Tracks: 1

Construction
- Structure type: Standard (On Ground)
- Parking: No

Other information
- Status: Functioning
- Station code: PDH
- Zone(s): Western Railway
- Division(s): Rajkot
Location
- Location within India Location within Gujarat

Paddhari railway station is a railway station on the Western Railway network in the state of Gujarat, India. Paddhari railway station is 25 km far away from Rajkot railway station. Passenger, Express and Superfast trains halt here.

== Nearby stations ==
Chanol is nearest railway station towards Jamnagar, whereas Khanderi is nearest railway station towards Rajkot Junction .

== Major trains ==
Following Express and Superfast trains halt at Paddhari railway station in both direction:

- 22959/60 Surat - Jamnagar Intercity Superfast Express
- 22961/62 Surat - Hapa Intercity Weekly Superfast Express
- 22945/46 Mumbai Central - Okha Saurashtra Mail

== See also ==
- Rajkot district
