= Than railway station =

Railway station in Gujarat, India

General information
- Location: Than, Gujarat; India
- Coordinates: 22°34′43″N 71°12′25″E
- Elevation: 142 metres (466 ft)
- System: Indian Railway Station
- Owner: Ministry of Railways, Indian Railways
- Operator: Western Railway
- Line: Viramgam–Okha line
- Platforms: 3
- Tracks: 3

Construction
- Structure type: Standard (On Ground)
- Parking: No

Other information
- Status: Functioning
- Station code: THAN
- Zone(s): Western Railway
- Division(s): Rajkot
Location
- Location within India Location within Gujarat

Than railway station is a railway station on the Western Railway network in the state of Gujarat, India. Than railway station is 48 km far away from Surendranagar railway station. Passenger, Express and Superfast trains halt here.

== Nearby Stations ==
Lakhamanchi is nearest railway station towards Wankaner Junction, whereas Vagdiya is nearest railway station towards Surendranagar Junction .

== Major Trains ==
Following Express and Superfast trains halt at Than railway station in both direction:

- 22957/58 Ahmedabad - Veraval Somnath Superfast Express
- 19015/16 Mumbai Central - Porbandar Saurashtra Express
- 22959/60 Surat - Jamnagar Intercity Superfast Express
- 22961/62 Surat - Hapa Intercity Weekly Superfast Express
- 22945/46 Mumbai Central - Okha Saurashtra Mail
- 11463/64 Somnath - Jabalpur Express (via Itarsi)
- 11465/66 Somnath - Jabalpur Express (via Bina)
- 19119/20 Ahmedabad - Somnath Intercity Express
- 19570 Veraval - Mumbai Central Express

== See also ==
- Surendranagar district
