= Jamwanthali railway station =

Railway station in Gujarat, India

General information
- Location: Jamwanthali, Jamnagar district India
- Coordinates: 22°25′45″N 70°19′14″E
- Elevation: 52 metres (171 ft)
- System: Indian Railways station
- Owner: Ministry of Railways, Indian Railways
- Operator: Western Railway
- Line: Viramgam–Okha line
- Platforms: 1
- Tracks: 1

Construction
- Structure type: Standard (on ground)
- Parking: No

Other information
- Status: Functioning
- Station code: WTJ
- Zone(s): Western Railway
- Division(s): Rajkot
Location
- Location within India Location within Gujarat

Jamwanthali railway station is a railway station on the Western Railway network in the state of Gujarat, India. Jamwanthali railway station is 31 km far away from Jamnagar railway station. Passenger and Superfast trains halt at Jamwanthali railway station.

== Nearby stations ==
Aliyavada is nearest railway station towards Okha, whereas Jaliya Devani is nearest railway station towards Rajkot Junction.

== Trains ==
The following Express/Superfast trains halt at Jamwanthali railway station in both directions:

- 22945/46 Saurashtra Mail
- 22959/60 Surat–Jamnagar Intercity Express

== See also ==
- Jamnagar district
