= Surat–Hapa Intercity Express =

Train in India

Overview
- Service type: Superfast
- Current operator: Western Railway zone

Route
- Termini: Surat (ST); Hapa (HAPA)
- Stops: 16
- Distance travelled: 552 km (343 mi)
- Average journey time: 9h 45m
- Service frequency: Weekly (Note: Runs one day in a week for every direction.)
- Train number: 22961/22962

On-board services
- Classes: AC chair car, First Class, Second Seating, General Unreserved
- Seating arrangements: Yes
- Sleeping arrangements: No
- Catering facilities: On-board catering E-catering
- Observation facilities: ICF coach
- Entertainment facilities: No
- Baggage facilities: Yes
- Other facilities: Below the seats

Technical
- Rolling stock: 2
- Track gauge: 1,676 mm (5 ft 6 in)
- Operating speed: 57 km/h (35 mph), including halts

The 22961/22962 Surat–Hapa Intercity Express is an Intercity train belonging to Western Railway zone that runs between Surat and Hapa in India. It is currently being operated with 22961/22962 train numbers on a weekly basis.

== Service ==
- The 22961/Surat–Hapa Intercity Express has an average speed of 57 km/h and covers 552 km in 9h 45m.
- The 22962/Hapa–Surat Intercity Express has an average speed of 56 km/h and covers 552 km in 9h 55m.

== Route and halts ==
22961/62 Surat–Hapa Intercity Express runs from Surat via Bharuch Junction, Vadodara Junction, Ahmedabad Junction, Viramgam Junction, Rajkot Junction to Hapa.

The important halts of the train are:

- Surat
- Kim
- Kosamba Junction
- Ankleshwar Junction
- Bharuch Junction
- Miyagam Karjan Junction
- Vadodara Junction
- Anand Junction
- Nadiad Junction
- Ahmedabad Junction
- Sabarmati Junction
- Viramgam Junction
- Surendranagar Junction
- Than
- Wankaner Junction
- Rajkot Junction
- Paddhari
- Hapa

== Coach composition ==
The train has standard ICF rakes with a max speed of 110 kmph. The train consists of 21 coaches:

- 1 First Class (FC)
- 3 AC Chair Car (CC)
- 6 Second Sitting (2S)
- 9 General Unreserved (GEN)
- 2 Seating cum Luggage Rake (SLR)

== Traction ==
Both trains are hauled by a Vadodara Loco Shed-based WAP-4 electric locomotive from Surat to Ahmedabad Junction. From Ahmedabad Junction, train is hauled by a Vatva Loco Shed-based WDM-3A diesel locomotive to Hapa and vice versa.

== Rake sharing ==
The train shares its rake with 12935/12936 Bandra Terminus–Surat Intercity Express and 22959/22960 Surat–Jamnagar Intercity Express.

== See also ==
- Hapa railway station
- Surat railway station
- Hapa–Shri Mata Vaishno Devi Katra Sarvodaya Express
- Hapa–Madgaon Superfast Express
- Hapa–Bilaspur Superfast Express
