= WTJ =

WTJ may refer to:

- Westminster Theological Journal, an evangelical theological journal published by Westminster Theological Seminary
- WTJ, the Indian Railways station code for Jamwanthali railway station, Gujarat, India
