= Okha–Jaipur Weekly Express =

Train in India

Overview
- Service type: Express
- First service: 9 July 2012; 13 years ago
- Current operator: Western Railways

Route
- Termini: Okha (OKHA); Jaipur Junction (JP)
- Stops: 18
- Distance travelled: 1,056 km (656 mi)
- Average journey time: 20 hours 30 mins
- Service frequency: Weekly
- Train number: 20952 / 20951

On-board services
- Classes: AC 2 tier, AC 3 tier, Sleeper class, General Unreserved
- Seating arrangements: Yes
- Sleeping arrangements: Yes
- Catering facilities: E-catering
- Observation facilities: Rake sharing with 22969/22970 Okha– Banaras Superfast Express
- Baggage facilities: No

Technical
- Rolling stock: LHB coach
- Track gauge: 1,676 mm (5 ft 6 in)
- Operating speed: 53 km/h (33 mph) average including halts

The 20951 / 20952 Okha–Jaipur Weekly Express is an Express train belonging to Western Railway zone that runs between Okha and Jaipur Junction in India. It is currently being operated with 20951/20952 train numbers on a weekly basis.

== Service ==
- 19573/Okha–Jaipur Weekly Express has an average speed of 56 km/h and covers 1,056 km in 18 hrs 50 mins.
- 19574/Jaipur–Okha Weekly Express has an average speed of 53 km/h and covers 1,056 km in 20 hrs 05 mins.

== Route and halts ==
The important halts of the train are :

- Okha
- Dwarka
- Khambhalia
- Jamnagar
- Hapa
- Rajkot Junction
- Surendranagar Junction
- Viramgam Junction
- Mahesana Junction
- Palanpur Junction
- Abu Road
- Jawai Bandh
- Falna
- Marwar Junction
- Ajmer Junction
- Kishangarh
- Phulera Junction
- Jaipur Junction

== Coach composition ==
The train has standard ICF rakes with max speed of 110 kmph. The train consists of 23 coaches:

- 1 AC II Tier
- 5 AC III Tier
- 10 Sleeper coaches
- 1 Pantry Car
- 4 General Unreserved
- 2 Seating cum Luggage Rake

== Schedule ==
Train number	Station code	Departure station	Departure time	Departure day	Arrival station	Arrival time	Arrival day
19573	OKHA	Okha	21:00 PM	Monday	Jaipur Junction	15:50 PM	Tuesday
19574	JP	Jaipur Junction	17:15 PM	Tuesday	Okha	13:20 PM	Wednesday

== Traction ==
Both trains are hauled by a Vatva Loco Shed-based WAP-4 from Okha to Jaipur and vice versa.

== Rake sharing ==
The train shares its rake with 22969/22970 Okha–Varanasi Superfast Express.

== See also ==
- Okha railway station
- Jaipur Junction railway station
- Okha–Varanasi Superfast Express
