= Vadodara–Jamnagar Intercity Superfast Express =

Train in India

Vadodara-Jamnagar Intercity Superfast Express
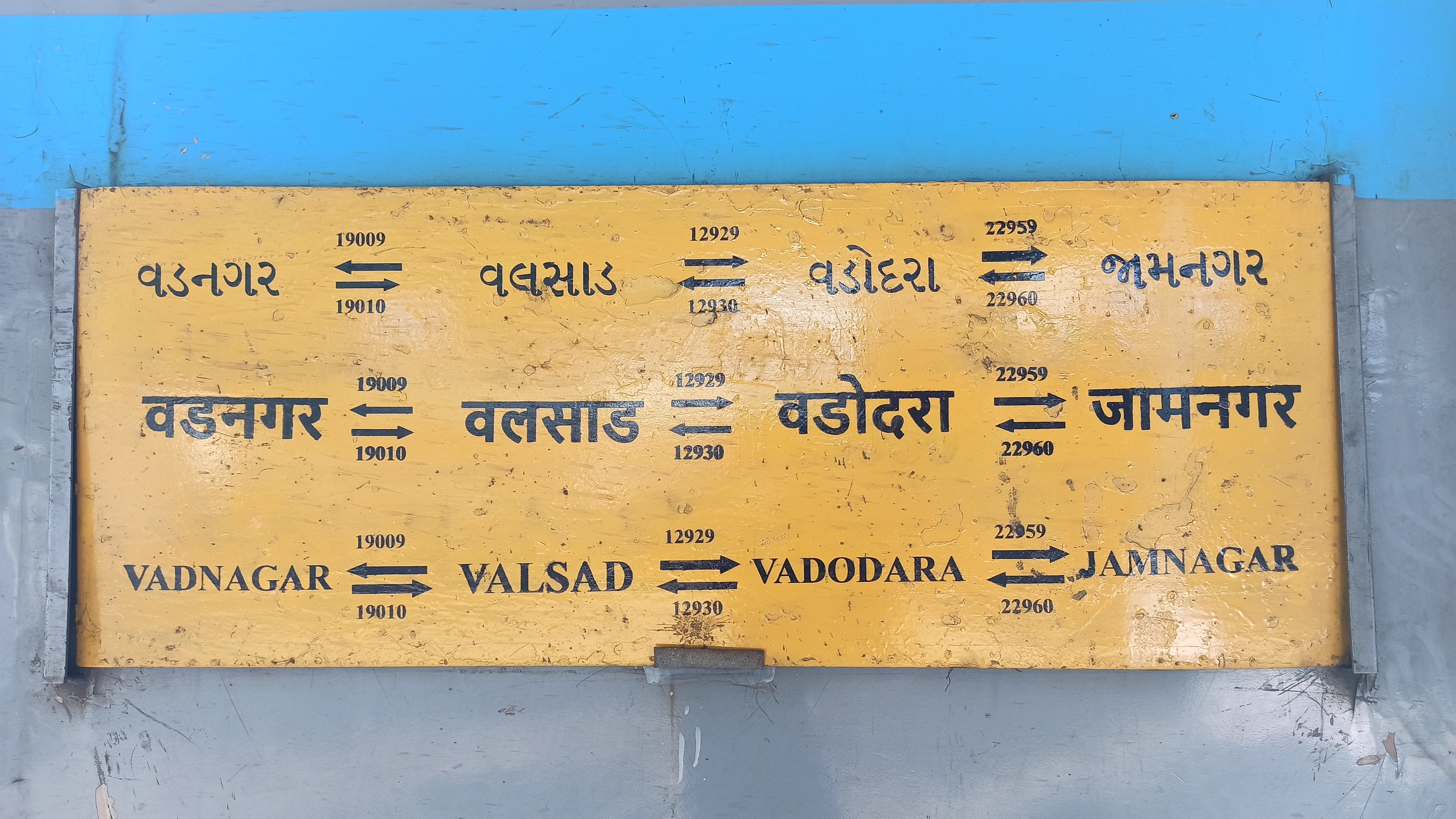

Overview
- Service type: Superfast Express
- Locale: Gujarat
- First service: 19 November 1986; 39 years ago
- Current operator: Western Railway

Route
- Termini: Vadodara (BRC); Jamnagar (JAM)
- Stops: 13
- Distance travelled: 431 km (268 mi)
- Average journey time: 7 hrs 41 mins
- Service frequency: Daily
- Train number: 22959 / 22960

On-board services
- Classes: AC Chair Car, Second Class Seating, General Unreserved
- Seating arrangements: Yes
- Sleeping arrangements: No
- Auto-rack arrangements: Overhead racks
- Catering facilities: E-catering only
- Observation facilities: Large windows
- Baggage facilities: Available
- Other facilities: Below the seats

Technical
- Rolling stock: LHB coach
- Track gauge: 1,676 mm (5 ft 6 in)
- Operating speed: 130 km/h (81 mph) maximum, 55 km/h (34 mph) average including halts.

The 22959 / 22960 Vadodara-Jamnagar Intercity Superfast Express is a superfast train owned and operated by Indian Railways - Western Railway zone that runs between Vadodara Junction and Jamnagar in India.

The Service operates as train number 22959 from Vadodara Junction to Jamnagar and train number 22960 in the reverse direction serving the state of Gujarat.

== Coaches ==
22959/22960 Vadodara - Jamnagar Intercity Express currently has 3 AC Chair Car(CC), 1 First Class(FC), 6 2nd Class Seating(2S), 9 General Unreserved(GEN) & 2 SLR (Seating Luggage Rake) coaches.

Coach Composition may be amended at the discretion of Indian Railways depending on demand.

== Service ==
22959 Vadodara - Jamnagar Intercity Superfast Express covers the distance of 426 km (265 mi) in 7 hours 40 mins at around 55 km/h (34 mph) and in 7 hours 40 mins as 22960 Jamnagar - Vadodara Intercity Superfast Express at around 55 km/h (34 mph).

As the average speed of the train is above 55 km/h (34 mph), as per Indian Railways rules, the fares includes a Superfast Express surcharge.

== Route & halts ==
The halts of the train are:

- Vadodara Junction
- Anand Junction
- Nadiad Junction
- Mahemadavad Kheda Road
- Ahmedabad Junction
- Sabarmati Junction
- Chandlodiya
- Ambli Road
- Viramgam Junction
- Surendranagar Junction
- Than
- Wankaner Junction
- Rajkot Junction
- Paddhari
- Jamwanthali
- Hapa
- Jamnagar

== Traction ==
As the route is fully electrified, it is hauled by a Vadodara Loco Shed based WAP-5 / WAP-7 electric locomotive from Vadodara to Jamnagar and vice versa.

== Rake sharing ==
The train shares its rake with;

- 12929/12930 Valsad-Vadodara Intercity Superfast Express
- 20959/20960 Valsad-Vadnagar Intercity Superfast Express.
