= Okha–Tuticorin Vivek Express =

Train in India

Okha - Tuticorin Vivek Express

Overview
- Service type: Vivek Express
- First service: 18 November 2011; 15 years ago
- Current operator: Western Railway

Route
- Termini: Tuticorin (TN); Okha (OKHA)
- Stops: 40
- Distance travelled: 2,711 km (1,685 mi)
- Average journey time: 52 hours 30 mins
- Service frequency: Weekly
- Train number: 19567 / 19568

On-board services
- Classes: AC 2 tier, AC 3 tier, Sleeper class, General Unreserved
- Seating arrangements: Yes
- Sleeping arrangements: Yes
- Catering facilities: E-catering; On-board catering
- Observation facilities: Large windows
- Baggage facilities: Yes

Technical
- Rolling stock: LHB coach
- Track gauge: 1,676 mm (5 ft 6 in)
- Operating speed: 51 km/h (32 mph) average including halts
Route map
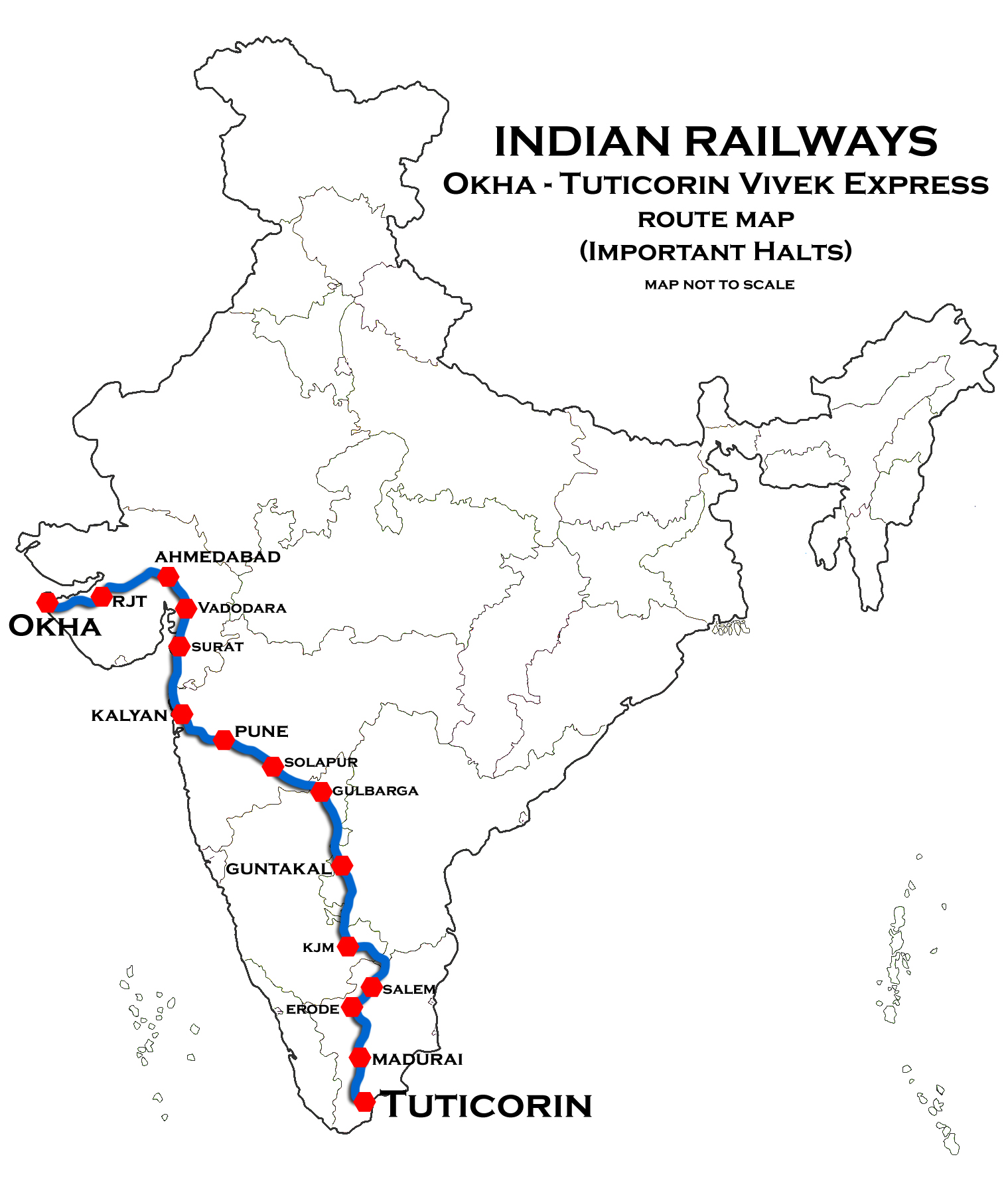

The 19567 / 19568 Okha–Tuticorin Vivek Express is an Express train belonging to Indian Railways - Western Zone that runs between Tuticorin and Okha in India.

It operates as train number 19567 from Tuticorin to Okha and as train number 19568 in the reverse direction serving the states of Tamil Nadu, Andhra Pradesh, Karnataka, Maharashtra & Gujarat.

== Coach composition ==
Before LHB coach upgrade this train was used to have ICF coach, now The train has standard LHB rakes with a max speed of 130 kmph. The train consists of 21 coaches :

- 2 AC II Tier
- 4 AC III Tier
- 6 Sleeper Coaches
- 4 General Unreserved
- 2 EoG (Seating cum Luggage Rake)

As is customary with most train services in India, coach composition may be amended at the discretion of Indian Railways depending on demand.

== Service ==
- The 19567/Tuticorin–Okha Vivek Express has an average speed of 51 km/h and covers 2711 km in 53 hrs 05 mins.
- The 19568/Okha–Tuticorin Vivek Express has an average speed of 53 km/h and covers 2711 km in 51 hrs 35 mins.

As the average speed of the train is lower than 55 km/h (34 mph), as per railway rules, its fare doesn't include a Superfast surcharge.

== Route ==
The 19567 / 68 Tuticorin–Okha Vivek Express runs from Tuticorin via Vanchi Maniyachchi Junction, Virudhunagar Junction, Madurai Junction, Dindigul Junction, Karur Junction, Erode Junction, Salem Junction, Bangarapet Junction, Krishnarajapuram, Yelahanka Junction, Raichur Junction, Wadi Junction, Kalaburagi Junction, Dharmavaram Junction, Guntakal Junction, Solapur, Pune Junction, Kalyan Junction, Vasai Road, Vadodara Junction, Ahmedabad Junction, Viramgam Junction, Rajkot Junction, Jamnagar, Dwarka to Okha and vice versa.

== Schedule ==
Train number	Station code	Departure station	Departure time	Departure day	Arrival station	Arrival time	Arrival day
19567	TN	Tuticorin	22:35 PM	Sun	Okha	03:35 AM	Wed
19568	OKHA	Okha	00:55 AM	Fri	Tuticorin	03:55 AM	Sun

== Traction ==
Earlier this train used to pull by Vatva Diesel Loco Shed WDM-3A , WDM-3D and Shakti WDG-3A. The entire route is now fully electrified, it is hauled by a Vadodara Loco Shed or Valsad Loco Shed-based WAP-7 and WAP-5 electric locomotive from end to end.

== Direction reversal ==
The train is reverses its direction once at;

- Erode Junction.
