= Sumerpur Jawai Bandh railway station =

Railway station in Rajasthan, India

Sumerpur Jawai Bandh Railway Station

General information
- Location: Jawai Dam, Pali district India
- Coordinates: 25.116031°N 73.148759°E
- Elevation: 292 metres (958 ft)
- System: Indian Railways station
- Owner: Indian Railways
- Operator: North Western Railway
- Line: Jaipur–Ahmedabad line
- Platforms: 2
- Tracks: 2

Construction
- Structure type: Standard on ground
- Parking: Yes
- Cycle facilities: No

Other information
- Status: Functioning
- Station code: SJWB
- Zone(s): North Western Railway Zone
- Division(s): Ajmer
Location
- Location within India Location within Rajasthan

Sumerpur Jawai Bandh railway station is located near Jawai Dam of Pali district in Rajasthan. It serves Jawai Dam area. It has two platforms. Its code is JWB. Express and Superfast trains halt here.

== Trains ==
- Suryanagri Express
- Dadar–Ajmer Superfast Express
- Ranakpur Express
- Amrapur Aravali Express
- Yoga Express
- Okha–Jaipur Weekly Express
- Jodhpur–Bangalore City Express (via Hubballi)
