= Bandra Terminus–Gorakhpur Humsafar Express =

Bandra Terminus – Gorakhpur Junction Humsafar Express
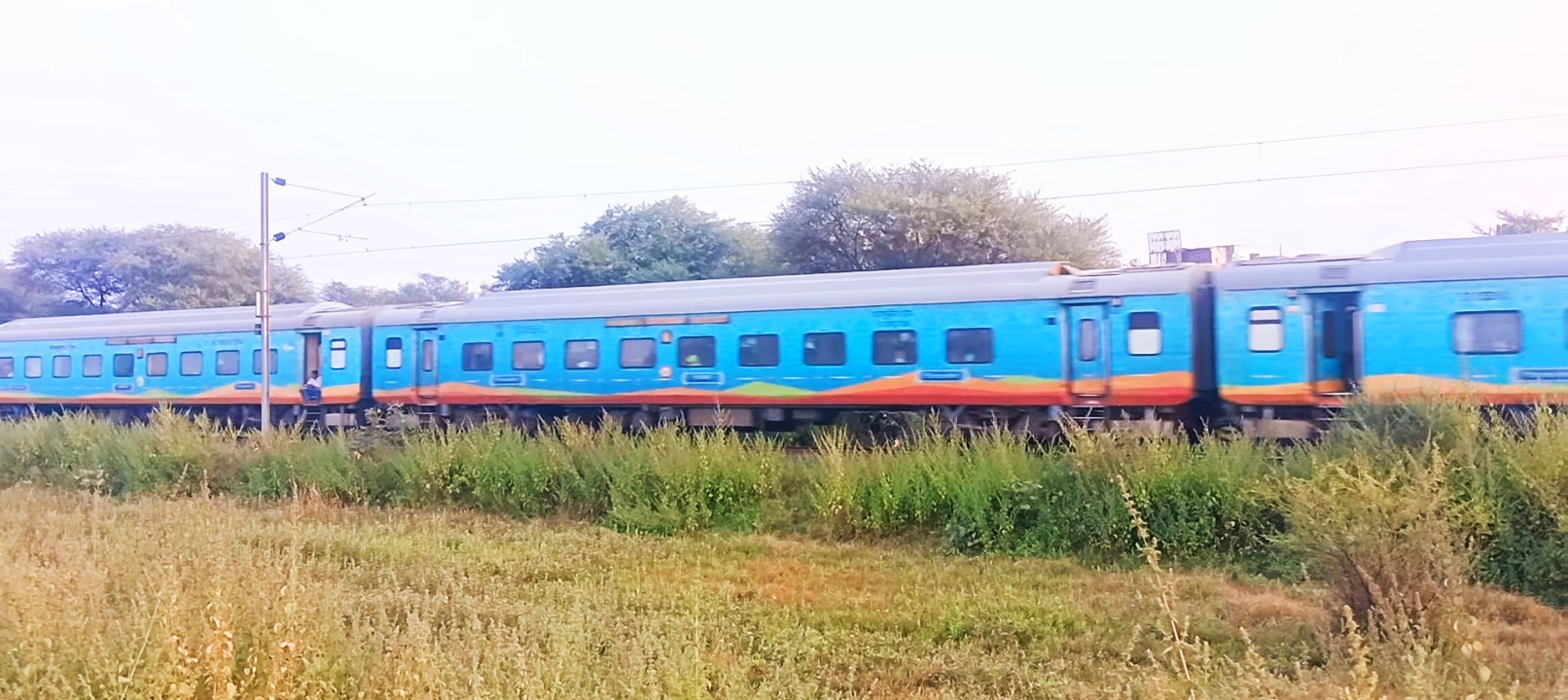
- Bandra Terminus – Gorakhpur Junction Humsafar Express At Ujjain Junction railway station

Overview
- Service type: Humsafar Express
- First service: 1 March 2021; 4 years ago
- Current operator: Western Railways

Route
- Termini: Bandra Terminus (BDTS); Gorakhpur Junction (GKP)
- Stops: 20
- Distance travelled: 1,977 km (1,228 mi)
- Average journey time: 36 hrs
- Service frequency: Weekly (Note: Runs once in a week for every direction.)
- Train number: 19091 / 19092

On-board services
- Class: AC 3 tier
- Seating arrangements: Yes
- Sleeping arrangements: Yes
- Catering facilities: Available
- Observation facilities: Large windows

Technical
- Rolling stock: LHB Humsafar
- Track gauge: 1,676 mm (5 ft 6 in)
- Operating speed: 55 km/h (34 mph) Avg. Speed

The 19091 / 19092 Bandra Terminus – Gorakhpur Humsafar Express is a superfast train belonging to Western Railway zone that runs between Bandra Terminus and Gorakhpur Junction.

It is currently being operated with 19091/19092 train numbers on weekly basis.

== Coach composition ==
The trains are completely 3-tier AC sleeper trains designed by Indian Railways with features of LED screen display to show information about stations, train speed etc. and will have announcement system as well, Vending machines for tea, coffee and milk, Bio toilets in compartments as well as CCTV cameras.

== Service ==
The 19091/Bandra Terminus – Gorakhpur Humsafar Express has an average speed of 53 km/h, and covers 1977 km in 37 hrs.

The 19092/Gorakhpur – Bandra Terminus Humsafar Express has an average speed of 56 km/h, and covers 1977 km in 35 hrs.

== Route and halts ==
The important halts of the train are :

1. Bandra Terminus
2. Borivali
3. Vapi
4. Surat
5. Vadodara Junction
6. Dahod
7. Ratlam Junction
8. Nagda Junction
9. Ujjain Junction
10. Shujalpur
11. Sant Hirdaram Nagar
12. Vidisha
13. Bina Junction
14. Saugor
15. Damoh
16. Katni Murwara
17. Maihar
18. Satna Junction
19. Prayagraj Chheoki Junction
20. Varanasi Junction (Reversal)
21. Mau Junction
22. Deoria Sadar
23. Gorakhpur Junction

== Schedule ==
Train Number	Station Code	Departure Station	Departure Time	Departure Day	Arrival Station	Arrival Time	Arrival Day
19091	BDTS	Bandra Terminus	05:10 AM	Mon	Gorakhpur Junction	18:10 PM	Tue
19092	GKP	Gorakhpur Junction	21:30 PM	Tue	Bandra Terminus	08:30 AM	Thu

== Rake sharing ==
The train share its rake with 22923/22924 Bandra Terminus–Jamnagar Humsafar Express.

== Traction ==
Both trains are hauled by a Vadodara Electric Loco Shed or Valsad Electric Loco Shed based WAP 7 locomotive from Bandra Terminus to Gorakhpur Junction and vice versa.

== See also ==
- Humsafar Express
- Bandra Terminus railway station
- Gorakhpur Junction railway station
