= Puri–Okha Dwarka Express =

Train in India

Overview
- Service type: Superfast
- Locale: Odisha, Andhra Pradesh, Maharastra & Gujarat
- First service: 1 January 1994; 31 years ago
- Current operator(s): East Coast Railway

Route
- Termini: Puri (PURI); Okha (OKHA)
- Stops: 40
- Distance travelled: 2,778 km (1,726 mi)
- Average journey time: 48 hours 30 minutes
- Service frequency: Weekly
- Train number(s): 20819 / 20820

On-board services
- Class(es): AC 2 tier, AC 3 tier, Sleeper Class, General Unreserved
- Seating arrangements: Yes
- Sleeping arrangements: Yes
- Catering facilities: Pantry Car, E-catering, On-board catering
- Observation facilities: Large windows
- Baggage facilities: No
- Other facilities: Below the seats

Technical
- Rolling stock: LHB coach
- Track gauge: 1,676 mm (5 ft 6 in)
- Operating speed: 130 km/h (81 mph) maximum, 56 km/h (35 mph) average including halts.
Route map
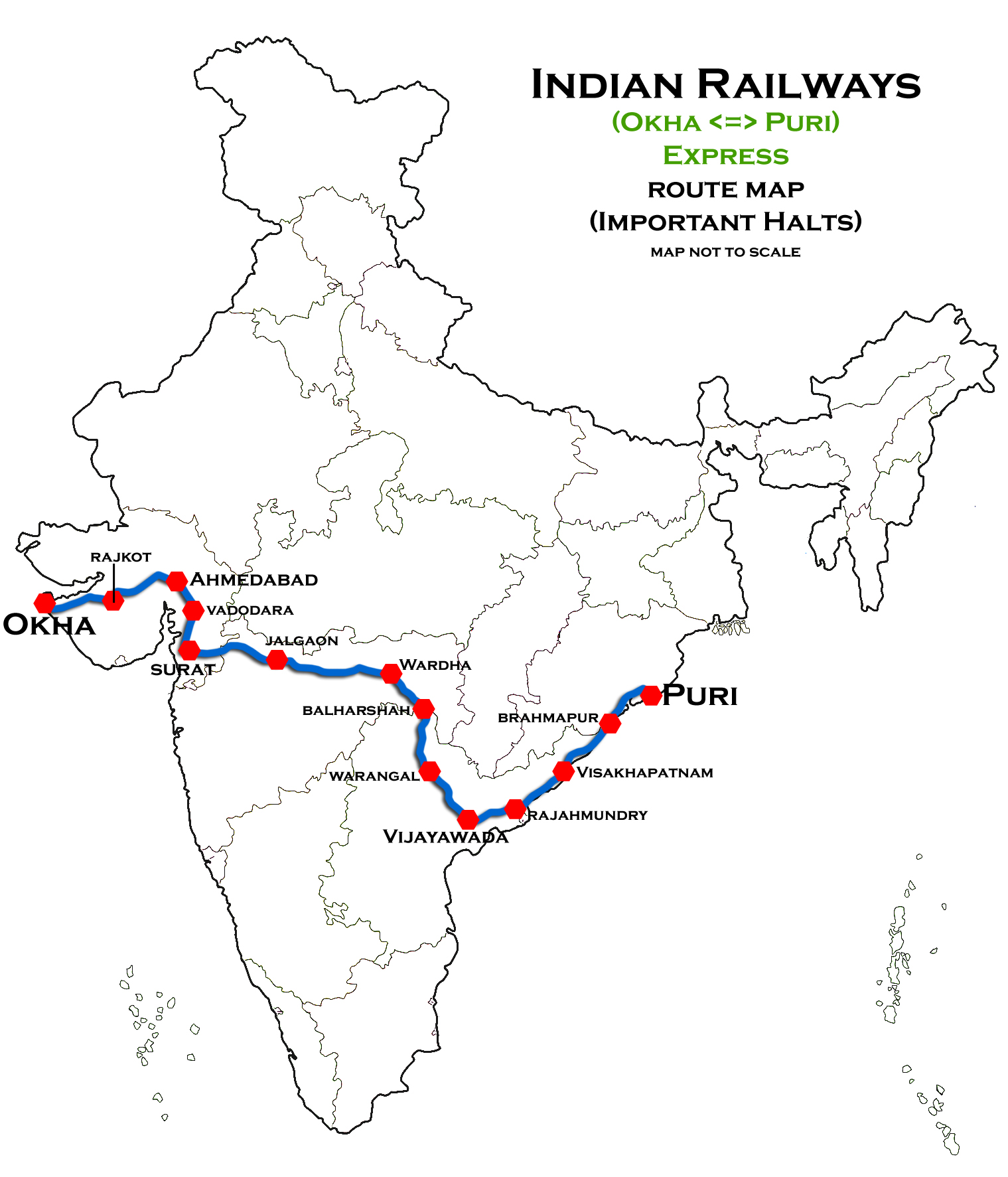

The 20819 / 20820 Puri–Okha Dwarka Express is a superfast train belonging to Indian Railways that runs between Puri and Okha in India. It is currently operated with 20819/20820 train numbers on a weekly basis.

== Coach composition ==
The train has standard LHB coaches with maximum speed of 110 km/h. The train consists of 22 coaches :

- 1 AC II Tier
- 5 AC III Tier
- 8 Sleeper coaches
- 5 General Unreserved
- 2 Seating cum Luggage Rake
- 1 Pantry Car

== Service ==
18401/Puri–Okha Dwarka Express covers the distance of 2,778 km (1,726 mi) in 48 hours 30 mins (53 km/h).

18402/Okha–Puri Dwarka Express covers the distance of 2,778 km (1,726 mi) in 47 hours 35 mins (56 km/h).

As the average speed of the train is more than 55 km/h (34 mph), as per railway rules, its fare includes a Superfast surcharge.

== Routes and halts ==
The important halts of the train are:

- Puri
- Khurda Road Junction
- Brahmapur
- Vizianagaram Junction
- Visakhapatnam Junction
- Eluru
- Vijayawada Junction
- Balharshah Junction
- Wardha Junction
- Badnera Junction
- Akola Junction
- Bhusaval Junction
- Jalgaon Junction
- Dondaicha
- Nandurbar
- Surat
- Vadodara Junction
- Ahmedabad Junction
- Viramgam Junction
- Surendranagar Junction
- Rajkot Junction
- Hapa
- Jamnagar
- Dwarka
- Okha

Train reverses its direction 3 times at:

- Khurda Road Junction
- Visakhapatnam Junction
- Vijayawada Junction

== Schedule ==
Train number	Station code	Departure station	Departure time	Departure day	Arrival station	Arrival time	Arrival day
20819	PURI	Puri	09:50 AM	Sunday	Okha	10:20 AM	Tuesday
20820	OKHA	Okha	18:40 PM	Wednesday	Puri	18:15 PM	Friday

== Traction ==
It is hauled by a Visakhapatnam Loco Shed or Vijayawada Loco Shed-based WAP-7 electric locomotive from Puri to Okha and vice-versa.
