= Suryanagri Superfast Express =

Train in India

Suryanagri Express

Overview
- Service type: Superfast Express
- Locale: Maharashtra, Gujarat & Rajasthan
- First service: 16 August 1998; 27 years ago
- Current operator: North Western Railway

Route
- Termini: Jodhpur (JU); Bandra Terminus (BDTS)
- Stops: 16
- Distance travelled: 937 km (582 mi)
- Average journey time: 16 hours 45 minutes
- Service frequency: Daily
- Train number: 12479 / 12480

On-board services
- Classes: AC First Class, AC 2 Tier, AC 3 Tier, Sleeper Class, General Unreserved
- Seating arrangements: Yes
- Sleeping arrangements: Yes
- Catering facilities: On-board catering, E-catering
- Observation facilities: Large windows
- Baggage facilities: Available
- Other facilities: Below the seats

Technical
- Rolling stock: LHB coach
- Track gauge: 1,676 mm (5 ft 6 in)
- Operating speed: 130 km/h (81 mph) maximum, 59 km/h (37 mph) average including halts.
Route map
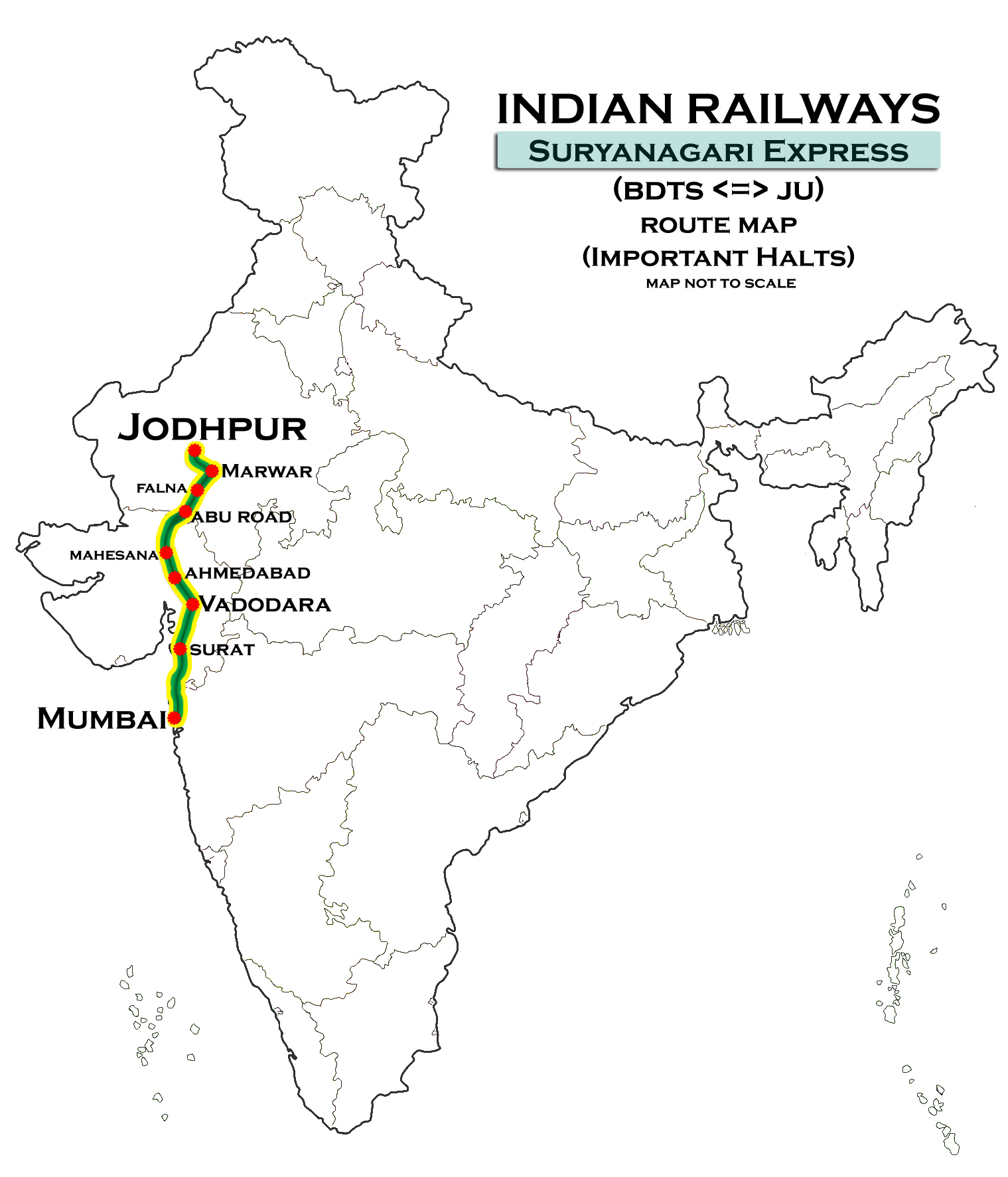

The 12479 / 12480 Suryanagri Express is a superfast express train running between the Indian cities of Jodhpur and Bandra Terminus, Mumbai. It initially plied between Jodhpur and Ahmedabad as the 4845/46 Suryanagri Express. In the 2002/03 railway budget its operation was extended to Bandra Terminus, Mumbai for four days a week. Later it became a daily train between Jodhpur and Bandra Terminus and was renumbered to 12479/12480.

It operates as train number 12479 from Jodhpur to Bandra Terminus and as train number 12480 in the reverse direction.

== History ==
In Metre Gauge era, there was a Suryanagri Express running between Jodhpur Junction and Udaipur City via Ahmedabad Junction which used to share rake with the MG Mandore Express. It was stopped in 1997 during Broad Gauge line construction. Later was re-introduced in 1998 as 4845/4846 Suryanagri Express. Timings in Metre Gauge era was:- for 483-MG Jodhpur Junction 15.25 pm; Ahmedabad Junction 03.25 am arrival & 04.05 am departure; Udaipur City 11.55 am & for 484-MG Udaipur City 15.15 pm; Ahmedabad Junction 23.05 pm arrival & 23.45 pm departure; Jodhpur Junction 11.45 am; 483-MG/484-MG used to cover 753.5 km (468 mi) in 20 hrs 30 mins time running at 36.75 km/h (23 mph) speed with reversal at Ahmedabad Junction. Timings as 4845/4846 was:- for 4845 Ahmedabad Junction 21.05 pm; Jodhpur Junction 05.50 am & for 4846 Jodhpur Junction 19.45 pm; Ahmedabad Junction 04.30 am. 4845/4846 used to cover 456 km (283 mi) in 08 hrs 45 mins time running at 52.12 km/h (32 mph) speed.

== Coaches ==
The train has standard LHB rakes with a max speed of 130 kmph. The train consists of 22 coaches:

- 1 AC First Class
- 2 AC II Tier
- 4 AC III Tier Economy
- 4 AC III Tier
- 5 Sleeper coaches
- 4 General Unreserved
- 2 EoG cum Luggage Rake

As with most train services in India, coach composition may be amended at the discretion of Indian Railways depending on demand.

== Service ==
12479 Jodhpur–Bandra Terminus Suryanagri Express covers a distance of 937 km (582 mi) in 16 hours 45 mins at 55.94 km/h (35 mph) and in 16 hours 45 mins as the 12480 Bandra Terminus–Jodhpur Suryanagri Express at 55.94 km/h (35 mph)

As the average speed of the train is more than 55 km/h (34 mph), the fare includes a Superfast surcharge.

== Route and halts ==
The 12479/12480 Suryanagri Express runs from Jodhpur Junction via Luni Junction, Marwar Junction, Rani, Falna, Jawai Bandh, Pindwara, Abu Road, Palanpur, Mahesana, Ahmedabad Junction, Vadodara, Surat, Vapi, Borivali to Bandra Terminus.

== Rake sharing ==
The train shares its rake with 22481/22482 Jodhpur–Delhi Sarai Rohilla Superfast Express.

== Traction ==
The entire route is now fully electrified, the train is hauled by a WAP-5 / WAP-7 electric locomotives from the Vadodara Loco Shed from end to end.
