= Bandra Terminus–Jamnagar Humsafar Express =

Train in India

Bandra Terminus - Jamnagar Humsafar Express

Overview
- Service type: Humsafar Express
- First service: 4 March 2019; 7 years ago
- Current operator: Western Railways

Route
- Termini: Bandra Terminus (BDTS); Jamnagar (JAM)
- Stops: 12
- Distance travelled: 813 km (505 mi)
- Average journey time: 14 hrs 30 mins
- Service frequency: Tri-Weekly (Note: Runs three days in a week for every direction.)
- Train number: 22923 / 22924

On-board services
- Class: AC 3 tier
- Seating arrangements: Yes
- Sleeping arrangements: Yes
- Catering facilities: Available
- Observation facilities: Large windows

Technical
- Rolling stock: LHB Humsafar
- Track gauge: 1,676 mm (5 ft 6 in)
- Operating speed: 55 km/h (34 mph) Avg. Speed

The 22923 / 22924 Bandra Terminus - Jamnagar Humsafar Express is a superfast train belonging to Western Railway zone that runs between Bandra Terminus and Jamnagar.

It is currently being operated with 22923/22924 train numbers on tri-weekly basis.

== Coach composition ==
The train was completely 3-tier AC sleeper trains designed by Indian Railways with features of LED screen display to show information about stations, train speed etc. and will have announcement system as well, Vending machines for tea, coffee and milk, Bio toilets in compartments as well as CCTV cameras. Now the train consists of three-tier AC sleeper coaches and non-ac sleeper coaches.

== Service ==
The 22923/Bandra Terminus - Jamnagar Humsafar Express has an average speed of 56 km/h, and covers 813 km in 14 hrs 30 mins.

The 22924/Jamnagar - Bandra Terminus Humsafar Express has an average speed of 60 km/h, and covers 813 km in 13 hrs 30 mins.

== Route and halts ==
The important halts of the train are :

- Bandra Terminus
- Borivali
- Vapi
- Surat
- Bharuch Junction
- Vadodara Junction
- Anand Junction
- Ahmedabad Junction
- Viramgam Junction
- Surendranagar Junction
- Wankaner Junction
- Rajkot Junction
- Hapa
- Jamnagar

== Schedule ==
Train Number	Station Code	Departure Station	Departure Time	Departure Day	Arrival Station	Arrival Time	Arrival Day
22923	BDTS	Bandra Terminus	23:55 PM	Mon, Thu, Sat	Jamnagar	14:25 PM	Sun, Tue, Fri
22924	JAM	Jamnagar	20:00 PM	Sun, Tue, Fri	Bandra Terminus	09:30 AM	Mon, Wed, Sat

== Rake sharing ==
The train shares its rake with 19091/19092 Bandra Terminus–Gorakhpur Humsafar Express.

== Traction ==
Both trains are hauled by a Vadodara Electric Loco Shed based WAP 7 locomotive from Bandra Terminus to Jamnagar and vice versa.

== See also ==
- Humsafar Express
- Bandra Terminus railway station
- Jamnagar railway station
