= Gorakhpur–Okha Express =

Train in India

Overview
- Service type: Express
- First service: 9 November 1989; 35 years ago
- Current operator(s): North Eastern Railway

Route
- Termini: Gorakhpur (GKP); Okha (OKHA)
- Stops: 38
- Distance travelled: 2,307 km (1,434 mi)
- Average journey time: 45 hours 30 minutes
- Service frequency: Weekly
- Train number(s): 15045 / 15046

On-board services
- Class(es): AC 2 Tier, AC 3 Tier, Sleepar Class, General Unreserved
- Seating arrangements: Yes
- Sleeping arrangements: Yes
- Catering facilities: Available
- Observation facilities: Large windows
- Baggage facilities: No
- Other facilities: Below the seats

Technical
- Rolling stock: LHB coach
- Track gauge: 1,676 mm (5 ft 6 in)
- Operating speed: 49 km/h (30 mph) average including halts.
Route map
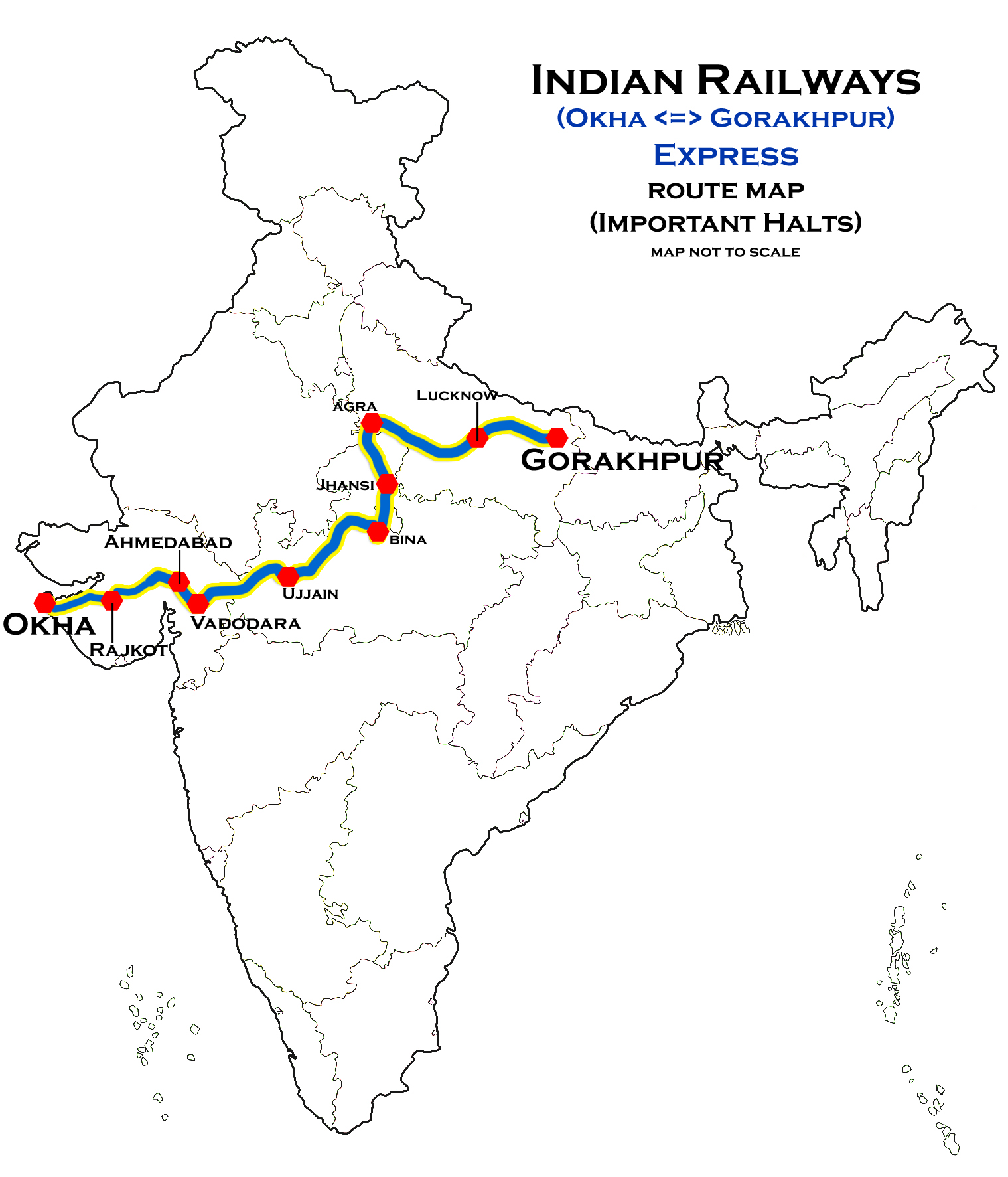

The 15045 / 15046 Gorakhpur–Okha Express is an express train of the Indian Railways connecting Gorakhpur Junction in Uttar Pradesh and Okha in Gujarat. It is currently being operated with 15045/15046 train numbers on a weekly basis.

== Coach composition ==
The train has standard LHB rakes with max speed of 110 kmph. The train consists of 22 coaches :

- 2 AC II Tier
- 6 AC III Tier
- 7 Sleeper Coaches
- 4 General Unreserved
- 2 End-on Generator
- 1 Pantry Car

== Service ==
15045/ Gorakhpur–Okha Express has an average speed of 49 km/h and covers 2307 km in 46 hrs 35 mins.

15046/ Okha–Gorakhpur Express has an average speed of 50 km/h and covers 2307 km in 43 hrs 50 mins.

== Route and halts ==
The important halts of the train are :

- Gorakhpur
- Basti
- Gonda Junction
- Aishbagh
- Kanpur Central
- Tundla
- Agra Cantonment
- Gwalior
- Jhansi Junction
- Bina
- Guna Junction
- Ruthiyai Junction
- Ujjain Junction
- Nagda
- Ratlam Junction
- Chhayapuri (Vadodara)
- Ahmedabad Junction
- Chandlodiya
- Surendranagar
- Rajkot Junction
- Hapa
- Jamnagar
- Dwarka
- Okha

== Schedule ==
Train number	Station code	Departure station	Departure time	Departure day	Arrival station	Arrival time	Arrival day
15045	GKP	Gorakhpur Junction	05:00 AM	Thursday	Okha	03:35 AM	Saturday
15046	OKHA	Okha	23:00 PM	Sunday	Gorakhpur Junction	18:50 PM	Tuesday

== Direction reversal ==
The train reverses its direction once at;

- Bina Junction

== Traction ==
As the route is fully electrified, it is hauled by a Vadodara Loco Shed-based WAP-7 electric locomotive from Gorakhpur to Okha and vice versa.

== See also ==
- Gorakhpur Junction railway station
- Okha railway station
- Sabarmati Express
