= Okha–Nathdwara Express =

Okha - Nathdwara Express
Overview
- Service type: Express
- First service: 28 September 2013; 12 years ago
- Current operator: Western Railway zone

Route
- Termini: Okha (OKHA); Nathdwara (NDT)
- Stops: 18
- Distance travelled: 1,137 km (706 mi)
- Average journey time: 22 hours 45 mins
- Service frequency: Weekly (Note: Runs one day in a week for every direction.)
- Train number: 19575/19576

On-board services
- Classes: First class, AC 2 tier, AC 3 tier, Sleeper Class, General Unreserved
- Seating arrangements: Yes
- Sleeping arrangements: Yes
- Catering facilities: On-board Catering; E-Catering
- Observation facilities: LHB coach
- Entertainment facilities: No
- Baggage facilities: No
- Other facilities: Below the seats

Technical
- Rolling stock: 2
- Track gauge: 1,676 mm (5 ft 6 in)
- Operating speed: 56 km/h (35 mph), including halts

The 19575/19576 Okha - Nathdwara Express is an express train belonging to Western Railway zone that runs between Okha and Nathdwara in India. It is currently being operated with 19575/19576 train numbers on a weekly basis.

== Service ==
The 19575/Okha - Nathdwara Express has an average speed of 51 km/h and covers 1137 km in 22 hrs 20 mins.

The 19576/Nathdwara - Okha Express has an average speed of 49 km/h and covers 1137 km in 23 hrs 10 mins.

== Schedule ==
Train Number	Station Code	Departure Station	Departure Time	Departure Day	Arrival Station	Arrival Time	Arrival Day
19575	OKHA	Okha	7:30 AM	SAT	Nathdwara	5:50 AM	SUN
19576	NDT	Nathdwara	9:40 PM	SUN	Okha	8:50 PM	MON

== Route and halts ==
The important halts of the train are:

- Okha
- Dwarka
- Jamnagar
- Rajkot Junction
- Wankaner Junction
- Surendranagar Junction
- Ahmedabad Junction
- Nadiad Junction
- Anand Junction
- Chhayapuri (Vadodara)
- Godhra Junction
- Dahod
- Ratlam Junction
- Mandsaur
- Neemuch
- Chittaurgarh Junction
- Mavli Junction
- Nathdwara

== Coach composite ==
The train has standard ICF rakes with max speed of 110 kmph. The train consists of 17 coaches :

- 1 AC II Tier
- 2 AC III Tier
- 6 Sleeper Coaches
- 6 General Unreserved
- 2 Seating cum Luggage Rake

== Traction ==
Both trains are hauled by a Vadodara Loco Shed based WAP-4E electric locomotive from Okha to Nathdwara and vice versa.

== Rake sharing ==
The train shares its rake with 22939/22940 Okha - Bilaspur Superfast Express.

== Direction reversal ==
Train reverses its direction at:

- Mavli Junction

== See also ==
- Okha railway station
- Nathdwara railway station
- Hapa - Bilaspur Superfast Express
