= Okha –Bilaspur Superfast Express =

Train in India

Okha-Bilaspur Superfast Express

Overview
- Service type: Superfast
- Locale: Gujarat, Maharashtra & Chhattisgarh
- First service: 11 November 2014; 11 years ago
- Current operator: Western Railway

Route
- Termini: Okha (OKHA); Bilaspur (BSP)
- Stops: 25
- Distance travelled: 1,868 km (1,161 mi)
- Average journey time: 31 hrs 55 mins
- Service frequency: Weekly. (Note: Runs one day in a week for every direction.)
- Train number: 22939 / 22940

On-board services
- Classes: AC First Class, AC 2 Tier, AC 3 Tier, Sleeper Class, General Unreserved
- Seating arrangements: Yes
- Sleeping arrangements: Yes
- Catering facilities: On-board Catering, E-Catering
- Observation facilities: Large windows
- Baggage facilities: No
- Other facilities: Below the seats

Technical
- Rolling stock: LHB coach
- Track gauge: 1,676 mm (5 ft 6 in)
- Operating speed: 59 km/h (37 mph) average including halts.
Route map
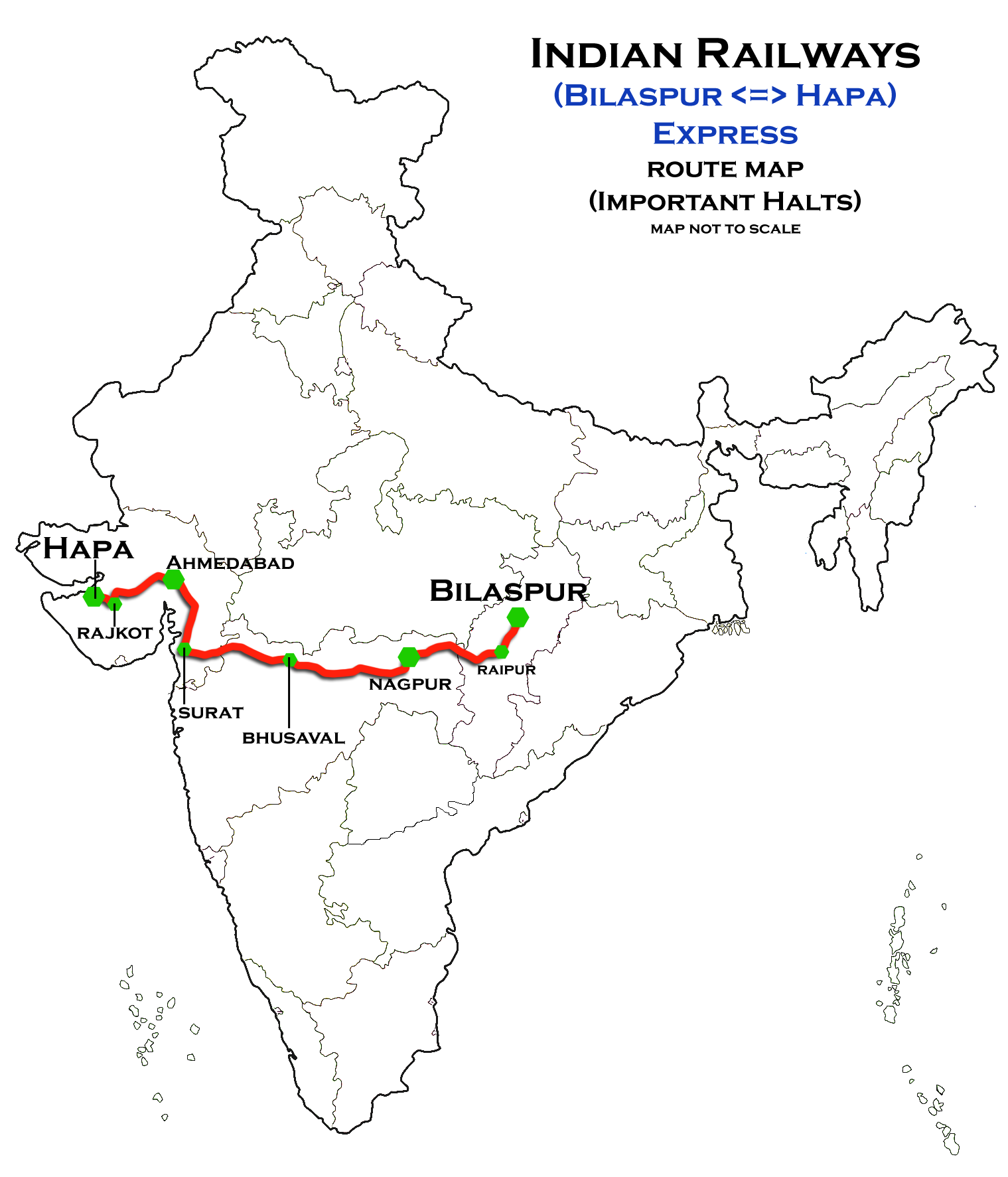

The 22939 / 22940 Okha-Bilaspur Superfast Express is a Superfast express train belonging to Western Railway zone that runs between Okha and Bilaspur Junction in India. It is currently being operated with 22939/22940 train numbers on a weekly basis.

== Coach composition ==
The train has LHB rakes with max speed of 130 kmph. The train consists of 23 coaches :

- 1 AC II Tier
- 5 AC III Tier
- 11 Sleeper
- 4 General Unreserved
- 2 Seating cum Luggage Rake

== Service ==
The 22939/Hapa - Bilaspur Superfast Express has an average speed of 58 km/h and covers 1693 km in 29 hrs 05 mins.

The 22940/Bilaspur - Hapa Superfast Express has an average speed of 59 km/h and covers 1693 km in 28 hrs 45 mins.

== Route and halts ==
The important halts of the train are:

- Hapa
- Rajkot Junction
- Surendranagar Junction
- Ahmedabad Junction
- Vadodara Junction
- Surat
- Nandurbar
- Jalgaon Junction
- Bhusaval Junction
- Akola Junction
- Badnera Junction
- Nagpur Junction
- Gondia Junction
- Durg Junction
- Raipur Junction
- Bilaspur Junction

== Schedule ==
Train number	Station code	Departure station	Departure time	Departure day	Arrival station	Arrival time	Arrival day
22907	Okha	Okha	21:55 PM	Saturday	Bilaspur	03:00 AM	Monday
22908	BSP	Bilaspur	10:45 AM	Monday	Okha	15:30 PM	Tuesday

== Traction ==
Both trains are hauled by a Vadodara based WAP5/WAP7 electric locomotive throughout the journey.

== Rake sharing ==
The train shares its rake with 19575/19576 Okha - Nathdwara Express.

== See also ==
- Hapa railway station
- Bilaspur Junction railway station
- Okha - Nathdwara Express
