= Bhatiya, Gujarat =

Bhatiya
- Village
- Location in Gujarat, India Bhatiya (India)
- Coordinates: 22.091615°N 69.273049°E
- Country: India
- State: Gujarat
- District: Devbhumi Dwarka

Population (2011)
  - Total: 17,352

Languages
  - Official: Gujarati, Hindi
- Time zone: UTC+5:30 (IST)
- PIN: 361315
- Vehicle registration: GJ
- Website: gujaratindia.com

Bhatiya is a large village in the Devbhumi Dwarka district in the Indian state of Gujarat.

== Demographics ==
As of 2011 India census, Bhatiya had a population of 17,352: Males constitute 49.31% of the population and females 50.69%. Bhatiya has an average literacy rate of 73.68%: male literacy is 81.55%, and female literacy is 66.16%. In Bhatiya, 12.81% of the population is under 6 years of age.

== Transport ==
=== Railway ===
Bhatiya railway station is located on the Western Railway Okha – Ahmedabad Segment. It is 70 km from Okha, 96 km from Jamnagar.
