= Okha–Varanasi Superfast Express =

Indian train

Overview
- Service type: Superfast
- First service: 29 March 2012; 14 years ago
- Current operator: Western Railways

Route
- Termini: Okha (OKHA); Varanasi Junction (BSB)
- Stops: 21
- Distance travelled: 2,042 km (1,269 mi)
- Average journey time: 34 hours 30 mins
- Service frequency: Weekly
- Train number: 22969 / 22970

On-board services
- Classes: AC 2 tier, AC 3 tier, Sleeper class, General Unreserved
- Seating arrangements: Yes
- Sleeping arrangements: Yes
- Catering facilities: On-board catering E-catering
- Observation facilities: Rake sharing with 20952/20951Okha–Jaipur Weekly Express
- Baggage facilities: No
- Other facilities: Below the seats

Technical
- Rolling stock: LHB coach
- Track gauge: 1,676 mm (5 ft 6 in)
- Operating speed: 55 km/h (34 mph) average including halts

The 22969 / 22970 Okha–Varanasi Superfast Express is a superfast train belonging to Western Railway zone that runs between Okha and Varanasi Junction in India. It is currently being operated with 22969/22970 train numbers on a weekly basis.

== Coach composition ==
The train has standard ICF rakes with a maximum speed of 110 km/h. The train consists of 23 coaches:

- 1 AC II Tier
- 5 AC III Tier
- 10 Sleeper coaches
- 1 Pantry Car
- 4 General Unreserved
- 2 Seating cum Luggage Rake

== Service ==
22969/Okha–Varanasi Superfast Express has an average speed of 55 km/h and covers 2042 km in 35 hrs 55 mins.

22970/Varanasi–Okha Superfast Express has an average speed of 58 km/h and covers 2042 km in 33 hrs 50 mins.

== Route and halts ==
The important halts of the train are :

- Okha
- Dwarka
- Jamnagar
- Rajkot Junction
- Ahmedabad Junction
- Vadodara Junction
- Ratlam Junction
- Nagda Junction
- Kota Junction
- Sawai Madhopur Junction
- Gangapur City
- Agra Fort
- Tundla Junction
- Kanpur Central
- Prayagraj Junction
- Varanasi Junction

== Schedule ==
Train number	Station code	Departure station	Departure time	Departure day	Arrival station	Arrival time	Arrival day
22969	OKHA	Okha	14:05 PM	Thursday	Varanasi Junction	02:00 AM	Saturday
22970	BSB	Varanasi Junction	21:55 PM	Saturday	Okha	07:45 AM	Monday

== Rake sharing ==
The train shares its rake with 20951/20952 Okha–Jaipur Weekly Express.

== Direction reversal ==
Train reverses its direction 1 times at:

- Vadodara Junction

== Traction ==
Both trains are hauled by an Electric Loco Shed, Vadodara-based WAP-5 WAP-7 locomotive.

== See also ==
- Okha railway station
- Varanasi Junction railway station
- Sabarmati Express
