= Ernakulam–Okha Express =

Train in India

Overview
- Service type: Express
- Locale: Kerala, Karnataka, Goa, Maharashtra & Gujarat
- First service: 1 April 1987; 39 years ago
- Current operator: Southern Railway

Route
- Termini: Ernakulam (ERS); Okha (OKHA)
- Stops: 47
- Distance travelled: 2,253 km (1,400 mi)
- Average journey time: 43 hrs 30 mins
- Service frequency: Bi-Weekly
- Train number: 16337 / 16338

On-board services
- Classes: AC 2 tier, AC 3 tier, Sleeper class, General Unreserved
- Seating arrangements: Yes
- Sleeping arrangements: Yes
- Catering facilities: Available
- Observation facilities: Large windows
- Baggage facilities: Available
- Other facilities: Below the seats

Technical
- Rolling stock: LHB coach
- Track gauge: 1,676 mm (5 ft 6 in)
- Operating speed: 51 km/h (32 mph) average including halts.
Route map
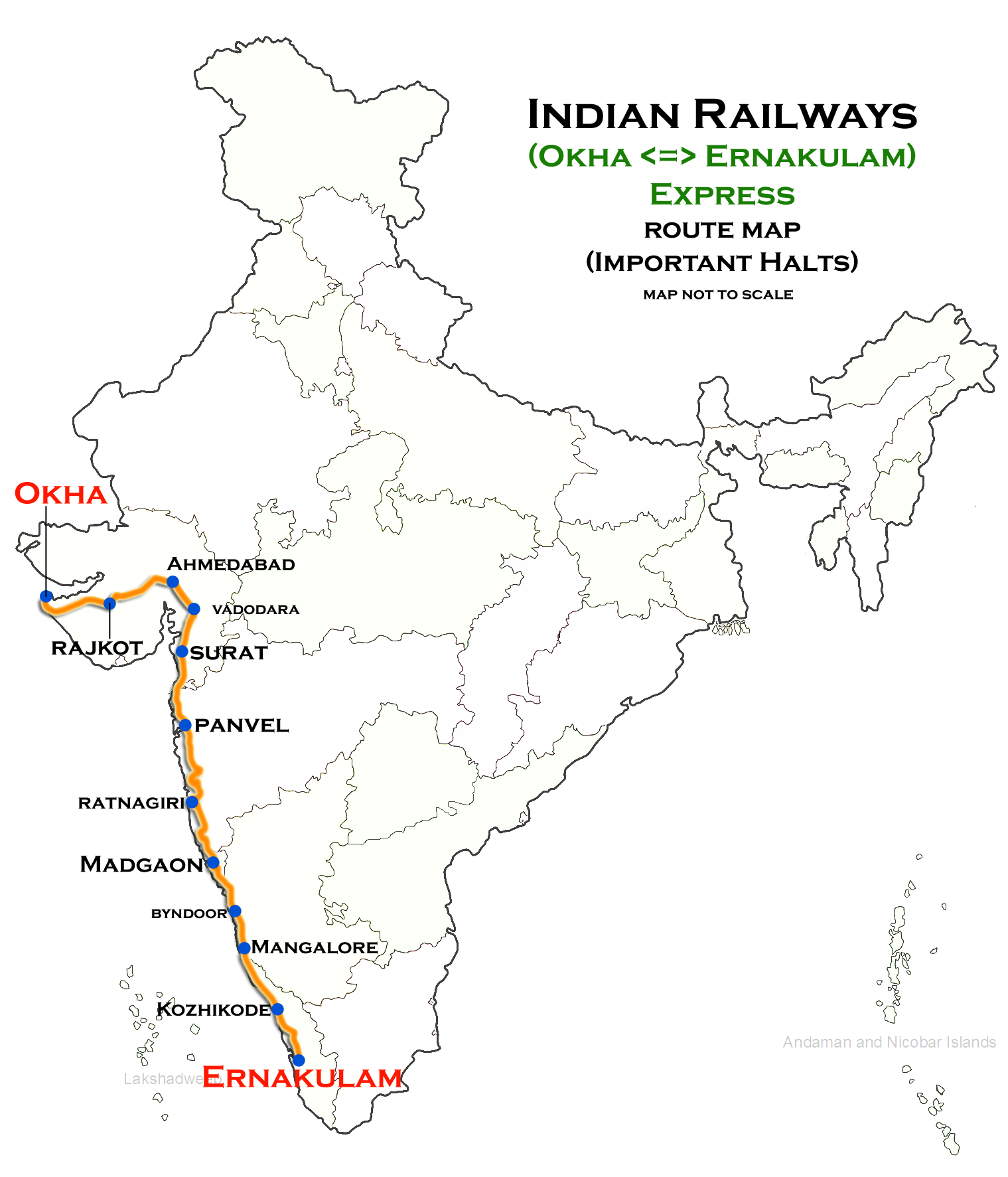

The 16337 / 16338 Ernakulam–Okha Express is bi-weekly Express train running between the cities of Kochi in Kerala and Okha in Gujarat. It mainly connects the people of Kerala living in Saurashtra region. It mainly runs and serve the people of the states of Goa, Maharashtra, Karnataka, Gujarat and Kerala. The time table of the train is amended during monsoon season and the train reaches Ernakulam Junction late by 2 to 3 hours of the original time but the monsoon time table does not affects its return journey. Few years before during monsoon season the train had its service only till Hapa but after that during monsoon also the train run till Okha.

The train first used to run between Cochin and Ahmedabad as Cochin–Ahmedabad Express and then it was extended up to Rajkot Junction making it Cochin–Rajkot Express. During that time the train used to start from Cochin Harbour Terminus station. At that time the train had a single service in a week. After Ernakulam Junction railway station was developed the train's origin was shifted to Ernakulam Junction. One more train was introduced after which train had bi-weekly service.

== Coach composition ==
earlier the train runs with ICF coach. And Now The train has standard LHB rakes with a maximum speed of 130 km/h. The train consists of 22 coaches.

- 2 AC II Tier
- 3 AC III Tier
- 12 Sleeper coaches
- 2 General Unreserved
- 1 Seating cum Luggage Rake
- 1 Pantry Car
- 1 Generator Car

== Service ==
16337/ Okha–Ernakulam Express has an average speed of 53 km/h and covers 2250 km in 41 hrs 10 mins.

16338/ Ernakulam–Okha Express has an average speed of 50 km/h and covers 2250 km in 44 hrs 15 mins.

== Route and halts ==
The important halts of the train are:

- Ernakulam Junction
- Thrissur
- Shoranur Junction
- Tirur
- Kozhikode
- Quilandi
- Kannur
- Payyanur
- Kasaragod
- Mangalore Junction
- Surathkal
- Udupi
- Karwar
- Madgaon Junction
- Ratnagiri
- Panvel
- Vasai Road
- Valsad
- Navsari
- Surat
- Vadodara Junction
- Ahmedabad Junction
- Rajkot Junction
- Jamnagar
- Dwarka
- Okha

== Schedule ==
Train number	Station code	Departure station	Departure time	Departure day	Arrival station	Arrival time	Arrival day
16337	OKHA	Okha	06:45 AM	Mon, Sat	Ernakulam	22:55 PM	Sun, Tue
16338	ERS	Ernakulam	20:25 PM	Wed, Fri	Okha	16:40 PM	Sun, Fri

== Traction ==
Earlier the train was hauled by WDM-3A Twins from Diesel Loco Shed Ernakulam to and fro. As the route is now fully electrified, it is hauled by an Erode Loco Shed or Royapuram Loco Shed based WAP-7 electric locomotive from Ernakulam to Okha.

== See also ==
- Ernakulam railway station
- Okha railway station
- Netravati Express
