= Rameswaram–Okha Express =

Train in India

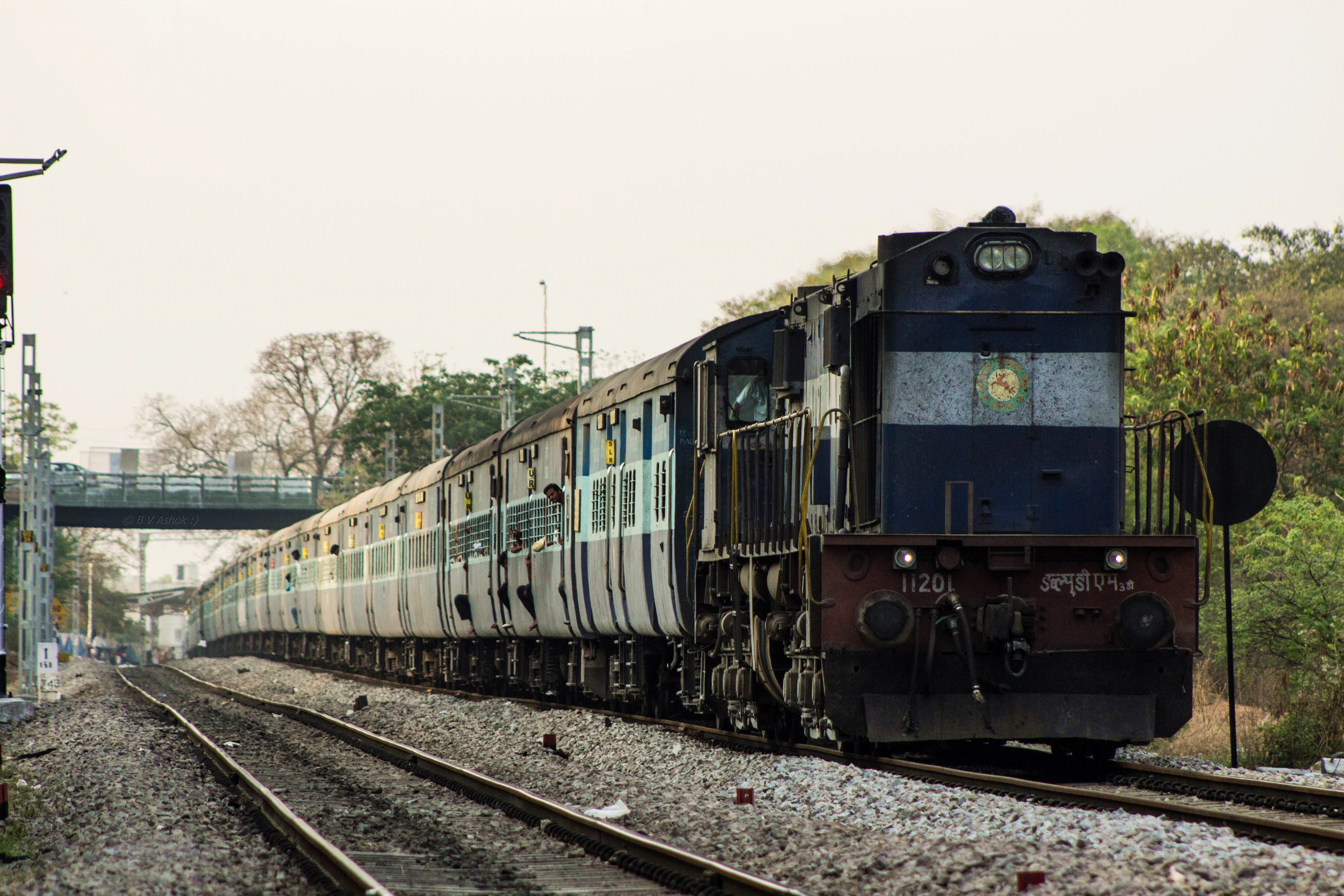
- Okha–Rameswaram Express near Dwarka.

Overview
- Service type: Express
- First service: 9 November 2006; 19 years ago
- Current operator: Southern Railways

Route
- Termini: Rameswaram (RMM); Okha (OKHA)
- Stops: 43
- Distance travelled: 3,153 km (1,959 mi)
- Average journey time: 58 hours 15 mins
- Service frequency: Weekly
- Train number: 16733 / 16734

On-board services
- Classes: AC 2 tier, AC 3 tier, Sleeper class, General Unreserved
- Seating arrangements: Yes
- Sleeping arrangements: Yes
- Catering facilities: Available
- Observation facilities: Large windows
- Baggage facilities: Available

Technical
- Rolling stock: LHB coach
- Track gauge: 1,676 mm (5 ft 6 in)
- Operating speed: 53 km/h (33 mph) average including halts
Route map
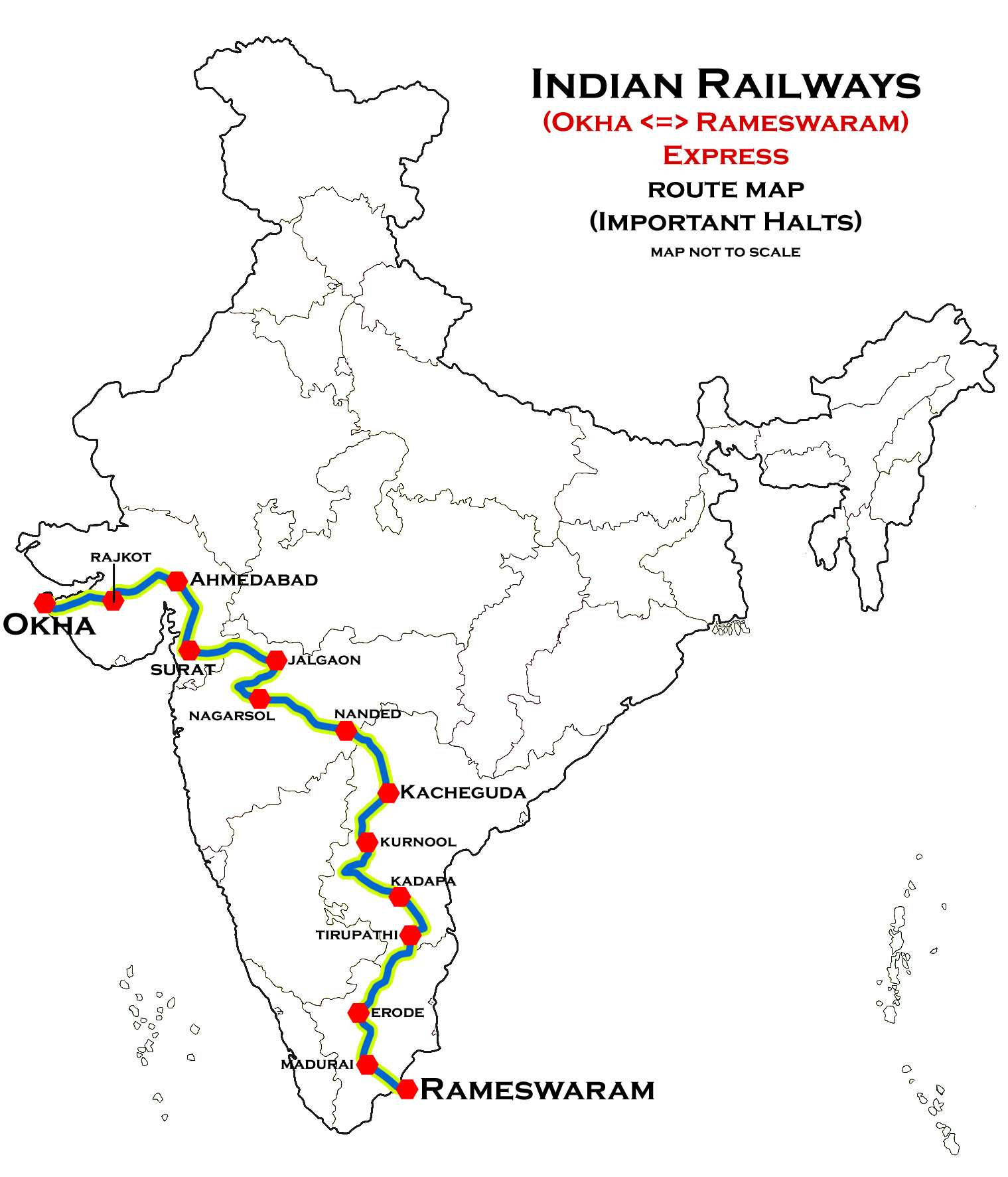

The 16733 / 16734 Rameswaram–Okha Express is an Express train belonging to Indian Railways – Madurai Division of the Southern Railway zone that runs between Rameswaram and Okha in India.

It operates as train number 16733 from Rameswaram to Okha and as train number 16734 in the reverse direction, serving the states of Tamil Nadu, Andhra Pradesh, Telangana, Maharashtra and Gujarat. Since 8th March 2024, this train runs with LHB coach.

== History ==
It is one of the first trains to be operated from Rameswaram immediately after Gauge Conversion of Manamadurai–Rameswaram line from Meter Gauge to Broad Gauge. This train is operated in such a long circuitous route because during its introduction, most of the railway lines in India are under gauge conversion from narrower gauges to broad gauge, so this train is operated using existing railway routes at that time. This train was originally introduced between Madurai and Manamad. Later this train was extended in both sides i.e. From Madurai it was extended until Rameswaram and from Manamad it was extended until Okha. At initial days of operation, its maintenance is done at Madurai, after constructing a railway maintenance yard at Rameswaram, the maintenance of this train has been shifted from Madurai to Rameswaram. At present, It is the only train from southern part of Tamil Nadu such as Madurai, Rameswaram which are directly connected with the Manamad, Aurangabad areas of Maharashtra.

== Coaches ==
The train has standard LHB rakes with a maximum speed of 130 km/h. The train consists of 21 coaches:

- 2 AC II Tier
- 8 AC III Tier
- 6 Sleeper coaches
- 2 General Unreserved
- 2 EOG cars
- 1 Pantry car

As is customary with most train services in India, coach composition may be amended at the discretion of Indian Railways depending on demand.

== Service ==
16733/Rameswaram–Okha Express covers the distance of 3,153 km (1,959 mi) in 59 hours 50 mins (49 km/h)

16734/Okha–Rameswaram Express covers the distance of 3,153 km (1,959 mi) in 58 hours 35 mins (53 km/h).

== Route & halts ==
The 16733 / 16734 Rameswaram–Okha Express runs from Rameswaram via Manamadurai Junction, Madurai Junction, Salem Junction, Jolarpettai Junction, Katpadi Junction, Tirupati, Yerraguntla Junction, Dhone Junction, Kacheguda, Nizamabad Junction, Hazur Sahib Nanded, Parbhani Junction, Jalna, Chhatrapati Sambhajinagar, Manmad Junction, Jalgaon Junction, Surat, Vadodara Junction, Ahmedabad Junction, Viramgam Junction, Surendranagar Junction, Wankaner Junction, Rajkot Junction, Jamnagar, Dwarka to Okha.

At present it is the only direct express train that runs from Rameswaram to nearby places of Mumbai such as Manmad and Surat.

== Schedule ==
Train number	Station code	Departure station	Departure time	Departure day	Arrival station	Arrival time	Arrival day
16733	RMM	Rameswaram	22:30 PM	Friday	Okha	10:20 AM	Monday
16734	OKHA	Okha	08:40 AM	Tuesday	Rameswaram	19:15 PM	Thursday

== Traction ==
Both trains are hauled by a Golden Rock Loco Shed based WDP-4D or Golden Rock Loco Shed based WDG-3A diesel locomotive between Rameswaram and Manamadurai Junction. After Manamadurai, both trains are hauled by a Royampuram Loco Shed based WAP-7 electric locomotive up to Okha and vice versa.
