= Okha–Shalimar Superfast Express =

Train in India

Okha - Shalimar Superfast Express

Overview
- Service type: Superfast
- First service: 22 November 2009; 16 years ago
- Current operator: Western Railways

Route
- Termini: Okha (OKHA); Shalimar (SHM)
- Stops: 30
- Distance travelled: 2,582 km (1,604 mi)
- Average journey time: 42 hrs 15 mins
- Service frequency: Weekly
- Train number: 22905 / 22906

On-board services
- Classes: AC First Class, AC 2 Tier, AC 3 Tier, Sleeper Class, General Unreserved
- Seating arrangements: No
- Sleeping arrangements: Yes
- Catering facilities: On-board Catering; Pantry car
- Baggage facilities: No
- Other facilities: Below the seats

Technical
- Rolling stock: ICF coach
- Track gauge: 1,676 mm (5 ft 6 in)
- Operating speed: 58 km/h (36 mph) average including halts

The 22905 / 22906 Okha–Shalimar Superfast Express is a Superfast Express train which belongs to Western Railway zone that runs between Okha of Gujarat and Shalimar of West Bengal in India. It is currently operated with 22905/22906 train numbers on weekly basis.

== Coach composition ==
Each train on the Express has standard ICF rakes and a maximum speed of 110 km/h, and consist of 23 coaches:

- 1 AC First Class
- 2 AC II Tier
- 5 AC III Tier
- 9 Sleeper Coaches
- 1 Pantry Car
- 3 General Unreserved
- 2 Seating cum Luggage Rake

== Service ==
The 22905/Okha–Shalimar Express has average speeds of 58 km/h and covers 2582 km in 42 hrs 40 mins.

The 22906/Shalimar–Okha Express has average speeds of 51 km/h and covers 2582 km in 43 hrs 25 mins.

== Route and halts ==
The important stops are:

- Okha
- Jamnagar
- Hapa
- Rajkot Junction
- Surendranagar Junction
- Ahmedabad Junction
- Vadodara Junction
- Surat
- Nandurbar
- Bhusaval Junction
- Akola Junction
- Badnera Junction
- Nagpur Junction
- Durg Junction
- Raipur Junction
- Bilaspur Junction
- Rourkela Junction
- Chakradharpur
- Tatanagar Junction
- Kharagpur Junction
- Shalimar

== Schedule ==
Train number	Station code	Departure station	Departure time	Departure day	Arrival station	Arrival time	Arrival day
22905	OKHA	Okha	08:40 AM	Sunday	Shalimar	03:20 AM	Tuesday
22906	SHM	Shalimar	21:05 PM	Tuesday	Okha	16:30 PM	Thursday

== Traction ==
From Okha both trains are hauled by a Vadodara Loco Shed-based WAP-4E electric locomotive up until Shalimar and vice versa.

== Rake sharing ==
The train was used to share its rake with 12905/12906 Howrah–Porbandar Express. Now, it is running independently.

== See also ==
- Okha railway station
- Shalimar railway station
- Howrah–Porbandar Express
