= Nathdwara railway station =

Railway Station in Rajasthan, India

Nathdwara

General information
- Location: Nathdwara, Rajsamand district, Rajasthan; India
- Coordinates: 24.911949°N 73.914129°E
- System: Indian Railways station
- Owner: Indian Railways
- Operator: North Western Railway
- Line: Marwar–Mavli line
- Platforms: 3
- Tracks: 3

Construction
- Structure type: Standard (on-ground station)
- Parking: Yes
- Cycle facilities: No

Other information
- Status: Functioning
- Station code: NDT
- Zone(s): North Western Railway
- Division(s): Ajmer

History
- Electrified: 2025
Location
- Location within India Location within Rajasthan

Nathdwara railway station is a railway station in Rajsamand district, Rajasthan. Its code is NDT. It serves Nathdwara town. The station consisted of two platforms on metre gauge. Now it has three platforms after conversion to broad gauge. Passenger, Express trains halt here.

Nathdwara is well known for Shrinathji Temple, Nathdwara.

== History ==
Nathdwara railway station existed on the 1,000 mm (3 ft 3 3/8 in) metre gauge track from Mavli Jn. to Marwar Jn. since 1930s southeast of Mandiyana village. Services on Mavli Jn. to Kamli Ghat section ceased on 26 April 2024 as the work on conversion of the track to 1,676 mm (5 ft 6 in) broad gauge started in 2018 progressed. A new station building and three platforms were built for Nathdwara. One train started from the newly commissioned Nathdwara station. The track is electrified.

The track from Nathdwara to Devgarh Madriya (station code DOHM) has been converted and awaiting approval from the Commissioner of Railway Safety.. This section is also electrified. The section from Devgarh Madriya to Kamli Ghat (station code KBK) to Goram Ghat (station code GGO) to (station code FLD) may not be converted and may be retained as a heritage track on which Metre gauge trains will be run for tourists.

== Nathdwara Town railway station ==
The existing station is 12 km from the main temple in Nathdwara town. A new 10 km long railway line is being constructed from the station to the edge of the town and a new railway station Nathdwara Town railway station (station code NDTWN) is being constructed. It will be a terminus where the track will end.

== Trains ==
The following train starts from Nathdwara railway station:

- 19575 Okha–Nathdwara Express (This train reaches Nathdwara at 6:30 am on Thursdays. The return service(19576) to Okha starts the same night at 8:45 pm.) It has a dedicated broad gauge platform which is not fully developed.

The following metre gauge trains halted at Nathdwara station before the services were discontinued in April 2024.

- 09695 Mavli - Marwar Metre Gauge Passenger
- 09696 Marwar - Mavli Metre Gauge Passenger.
