= Dwarka Express =

Train in India

Overview
- Service type: Express
- First service: 15 December 2003; 21 years ago
- Current operator(s): Northeast Frontier Railway

Route
- Termini: Okha (OKHA); Guwahati (GHY)
- Stops: 42
- Distance travelled: 3,237 km (2,011 mi)
- Average journey time: 64 hours 55 minutes
- Service frequency: Weekly
- Train number(s): 15635 / 15636

On-board services
- Class(es): AC 2 Tier, AC 3 Tier, Sleepar Class, General Unreserved
- Seating arrangements: Yes
- Sleeping arrangements: Yes
- Catering facilities: Available
- Observation facilities: Large windows
- Baggage facilities: Available
- Other facilities: Below the seats

Technical
- Rolling stock: LHB coach
- Track gauge: 1,676 mm (5 ft 6 in)
- Operating speed: 49 km/h (30 mph) average including halts.

The 15635 / 15636 Dwarka Express is an express train of the Indian Railways connecting Okha in Gujarat and Guwahati Junction in Assam. It is currently being operated with 15635/15636 train numbers on a weekly basis.

== Coach composition ==
The train consists of 22 coaches:

- 2 AC II Tier
- 6 AC III Tier
- 7 Sleeper coaches
- 4 General Unreserved
- 2 Seating cum Luggage Rake
- 1 Pantry car

== Service ==
15635/Okha–Guwahati Dwarka Express has an average speed of 48 km/h and covers 3237 km in 66 hrs 50 mins.

15636/Guwahati–Okha Dwarka Express has an average speed of 53 km/h and covers 3237 km in 61 hrs 00 mins.

== Route & halts ==
- Okha
- Hapa
- Rajkot
- Viramgam
- Ahmedabad Junction
- Chhayapuri
- Ratlam Junction
- Kota Junction
- Sawai Madhopur
- Agra Fort
- Kanpur Central
- Lucknow Charbagh
- Varanasi
- Pt. Deen Dayal Upadhyaya Junction
- Buxar
- Patna Junction
- Barauni Junction
- Katihar Junction
- Kishanganj
- New Jalpaiguri (Siliguri)
- New Alipurduar
- Kamakhya
- Guwahati.

== Schedule ==
Train number	Station code	Departure station	Departure time	Departure day	Arrival station	Arrival time	Arrival day
15635	OKHA	Okha	11:40 AM	Friday	Guwahati Junction	06:30 AM	Monday
15636	GHY	Guwahati Junction	10:45 AM	Monday	Okha	23:45 PM	Wednesday

== Traction ==
The route is now fully electrified, it is hauled by a Vadodara Loco Shed-based WAP-7 electric locomotive on its entire journey.

== See also ==
- Gandhidham–Kamakhya Express
- Sabarmati Express
