= Uttaranchal Express =

Train in India

Overview
- Service type: Express
- Locale: Gujarat, Rajasthan, Haryana, Delhi, Uttar Pradesh & Uttarakhand
- First service: 7 July 2000; 25 years ago
- Current operator: Western Railway

Route
- Termini: Okha (OKHA); Dehradun (DDN)
- Stops: 33
- Distance travelled: 1,681 km (1,045 mi)
- Average journey time: 32 hrs 40 mins
- Service frequency: Weekly
- Train number: 19565 / 19566

On-board services
- Classes: AC 2 Tier, AC 3 Tier, Sleeper Class, General Unreserved
- Seating arrangements: Yes
- Sleeping arrangements: Yes
- Catering facilities: E-catering, On-board catering
- Observation facilities: Large windows
- Baggage facilities: Available
- Other facilities: Below the seats

Technical
- Rolling stock: both ICF coach and LHB coach
- Track gauge: 1,676 mm (5 ft 6 in)
- Operating speed: 130 km/h (81 mph) maximum, 52 km/h (32 mph) average including halts.
Route map
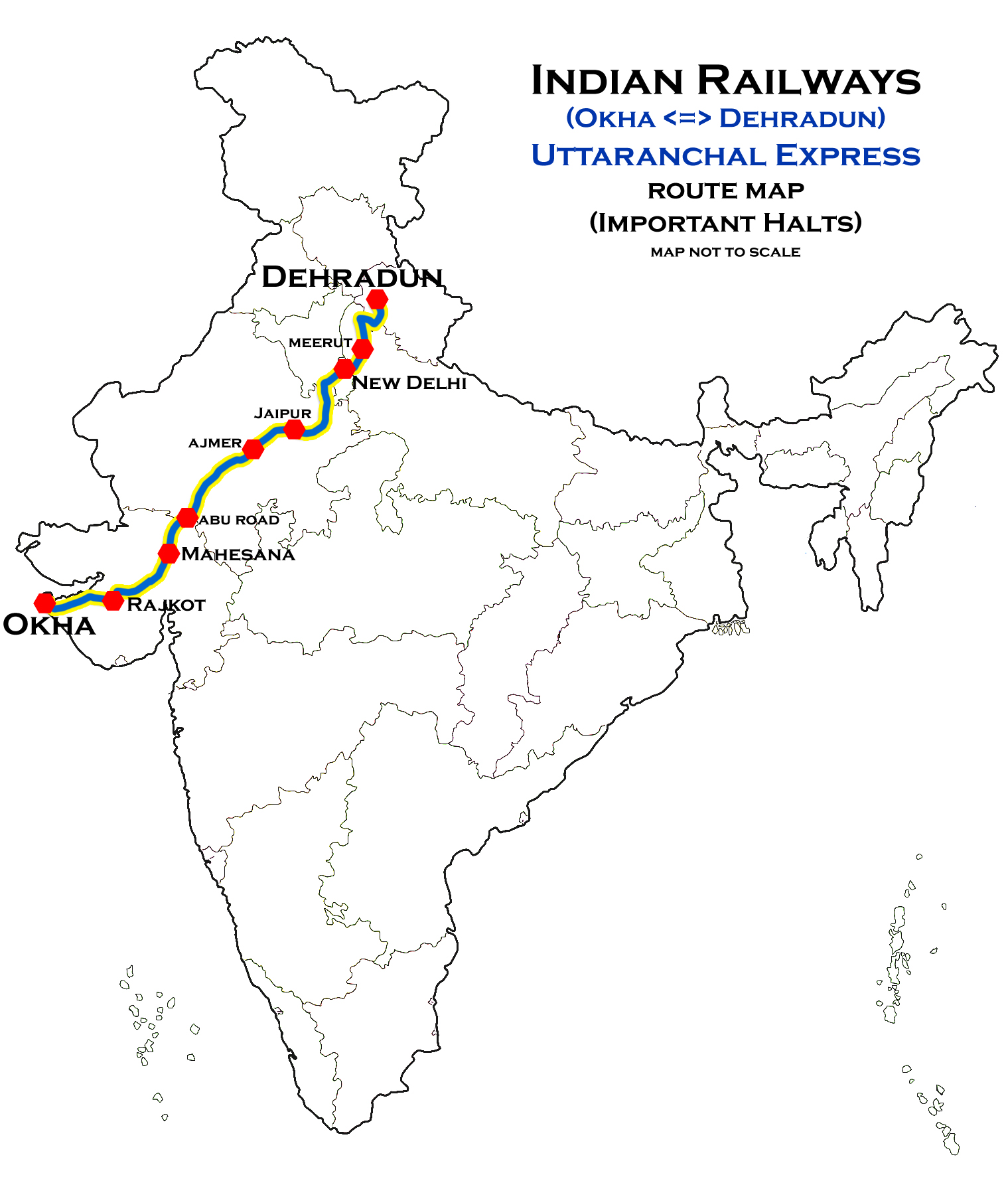

The 19565 / 19566 Uttaranchal Express is an express train belonging to Indian Railways – Western Railway zone that runs between Okha, Gujarat & Dehradun, Uttarakhand in India.

It operates as train number 19565 from Okha to Dehradun and as train number 19566 in the reverse direction, serving the states of Gujarat, Rajasthan, Haryana, Delhi, Uttar Pradesh and Uttarakhand.

It is named after the state of Uttarakhand which until October 2006 was known as Uttaranchal.

== Coach composition ==
The train has LHB rakes with max speed of 130 km/h. The train consists of 16 coaches;

- 1 AC II Tier
- 3 AC III Tier
- 6 Sleeper coaches
- 4 General Unreserved
- 2 Seating cum Luggage Rake.

== Introduction and history ==
Uttaranchal Express was introduced as a weekly train to connect religious places of Haridwar & Okha after formation of Uttaranchal(NowUttarakhand) state in the 2000s era. By 2000s, Ahmedabad - Rajkot - Okha line was converted to Broad Gauge from earlier Meter Gauge & this train was the 1st train to connect Okha with Delhi via Ahmedabad & Jaipur. Train was numbered 9465/9466 that time & used to cover 1,752 kilometres (1,089 mi) in 33 hours 40 mins running at 52 kilometres per hour (32 mph) speed. The schedule was as follows: -

| Train number | Station code | Departure station | Departure time | Departure day | Arrival station | Arrival time | Arrival day |
|---|---|---|---|---|---|---|---|
| 9465 | OKHA | Okha | 20:00 PM | Thursday | Dehradun | 05:40 AM | Saturday |
| 9466 | DDN | Dehradun | 21:50 PM | Saturday | Okha | 07:30 AM | Monday |

The train used to run via Ahmedabad, having a reversal there. Timings of 9465 at Ahmedabad was 05.30 AM/05.55 AM, timings at Ajmer Junction was 14.45 PM/14.55 PM, timings at Jaipur was 17.10 PM/17.25 PM & timings at New Delhi was 22.40 PM/22.55 PM. Like wise timings of 9466 at New Delhi was 04.25 AM/04.40 AM, timings at Jaipur was 09.55 AM/10.10 AM, timings at Ajmer Junction was 12.25 PM/12.35 PM & timings at Ahmedabad was 21.25 PM/21.50 PM. Later the train number was changed to 9565/9566 & schedule was changed. The timings were as follows: -

| Train number | Station code | Departure station | Departure time | Departure day | Arrival station | Arrival time | Arrival day |
|---|---|---|---|---|---|---|---|
| 9565 | OKHA | Okha | 09:35 AM | Friday | Dehradun | 19:15 PM | Saturday |
| 9566 | DDN | Dehradun | 06:00 AM | Sunday | Okha | 15:40 PM | Monday |

== Current service with route and halts ==
With the completion of Viramgram - Katosan - Mahesana gauge conversion work from Meter Gauge to Broad Gauge in 2010s era, Uttaranchal Express now avoids Ahmedabad & travels 71 kilometres (44 mi) less, saving journey time of 1 hour 15 minutes now. Currently 19565/Okha–Dehradun Uttaranchal Express covers the distance of 1,681 km (1,045 mi) in 32 hrs 15 mins (52.00 km/h). 19566/Dehradun–Okha Uttaranchal Express covers the distance of 1,681 km (1,045 mi) in 32 hrs 15 mins (52.00 km/h).

The 19565 / 19566 Okha–Dehradun Uttaranchal Express runs from Okha via Jamnagar, Rajkot Junction, Palanpur Junction, Abu Road, Ajmer Junction, Jaipur, Delhi Sarai Rohilla, New Delhi, Ghaziabad, Meerut City jn., Muzaffarnagar, Haridwar Junction to Dehradun and vice versa.

== Schedule ==
| Train number | Station code | Departure station | Departure time | Departure day | Arrival station | Arrival time | Arrival day |
|---|---|---|---|---|---|---|---|
| 19565 | OKHA | Okha | 10:00 AM | Friday | Dehradun | 18:15 PM | Saturday |
| 19566 | DDN | Dehradun | 05:50 AM | Sunday | Okha | 14:05 PM | Monday |

== Traction ==
As the entire route is fully electrified, it is hauled by a Vadodara Loco Shed based WAP-7 electric locomotive or Vatva Diesel Loco Shed WDM-3D diesel locomotive from end to end.
