= Okha railway station =

Railway station in Gujarat, India

General information
- Location: Okha, Gujarat; India
- Coordinates: 22°28′18″N 69°04′36″E
- Elevation: 5 m (16 ft)
- System: Indian Railways station
- Owner: Indian Railways
- Operator: Western Railway
- Line: Viramgam–Okha line
- Platforms: 3
- Tracks: 3

Construction
- Structure type: Standard
- Parking: Yes

Other information
- Status: Functioning
- Station code: OKHA
- Zone(s): Western Railway
- Division(s): Rajkot

History
- Opened: 1922; 104 years ago
- Former names: Jamnagar & Dwarka Railway

Services
Preceding station	Indian Railways	Following station
Terminus	Western Railway zone	Dwarka towards Rajkot Junction
Route map
- Source:Google Maps; 59503 Viramgam–Okha Passenger
Location
- Location within India Location within Gujarat

Okha railway station is a railway station in Okha, Gujarat. It belongs to Rajkot Division of Western Railway in India.

== Geography ==
The Okha railway station is one of the western broad-gauge railway stations in India. It serves the port of Okha. There are trains to destinations in India like Mumbai, Somnath, Howrah, Nathdwara, Gorakhpur, Puri, Guwahati, Rameswaram, Kochi, Tuticorin, Varanasi, Dehradun and Jaipur.

== History ==
Jamnagar–Okha metre-gauge line was opened for traffic in the year 1922 by Jamnagar & Dwarka Railway. Later Jamnagar & Dwaraka Railway was merged into Saurashtra Railway in April 1948. Later it was undertaken by Western Railway. Gauge Conversion of Hapa–Okha section was later completed in 1984 by Indian Railways.

== Major trains ==
Following Express/Superfast trains originate from Okha railway station:

- 15635/15636 Dwarka Express
- 15045/15046 Gorakhpur–Okha Express
- 19567/19568 Okha–Tuticorin Vivek Express
- 16337/16338 Ernakulam–Okha Express
- 19251/19252 Somnath–Okha Express
- 22969/22970 Okha–Varanasi Superfast Express
- 22905/22906 Okha–Shalimar Superfast Express
- 16733/16734 Rameswaram–Okha Express
- 19575/19576 Okha–Nathdwara Express
- 20819/20820 Puri–Okha Dwarka Express
- 19565/19566 Uttaranchal Express
- 19573/19574 Okha–Jaipur Weekly Express
- 22945/22946 Saurashtra Mail
