= Saurashtra Mail =

Train in India

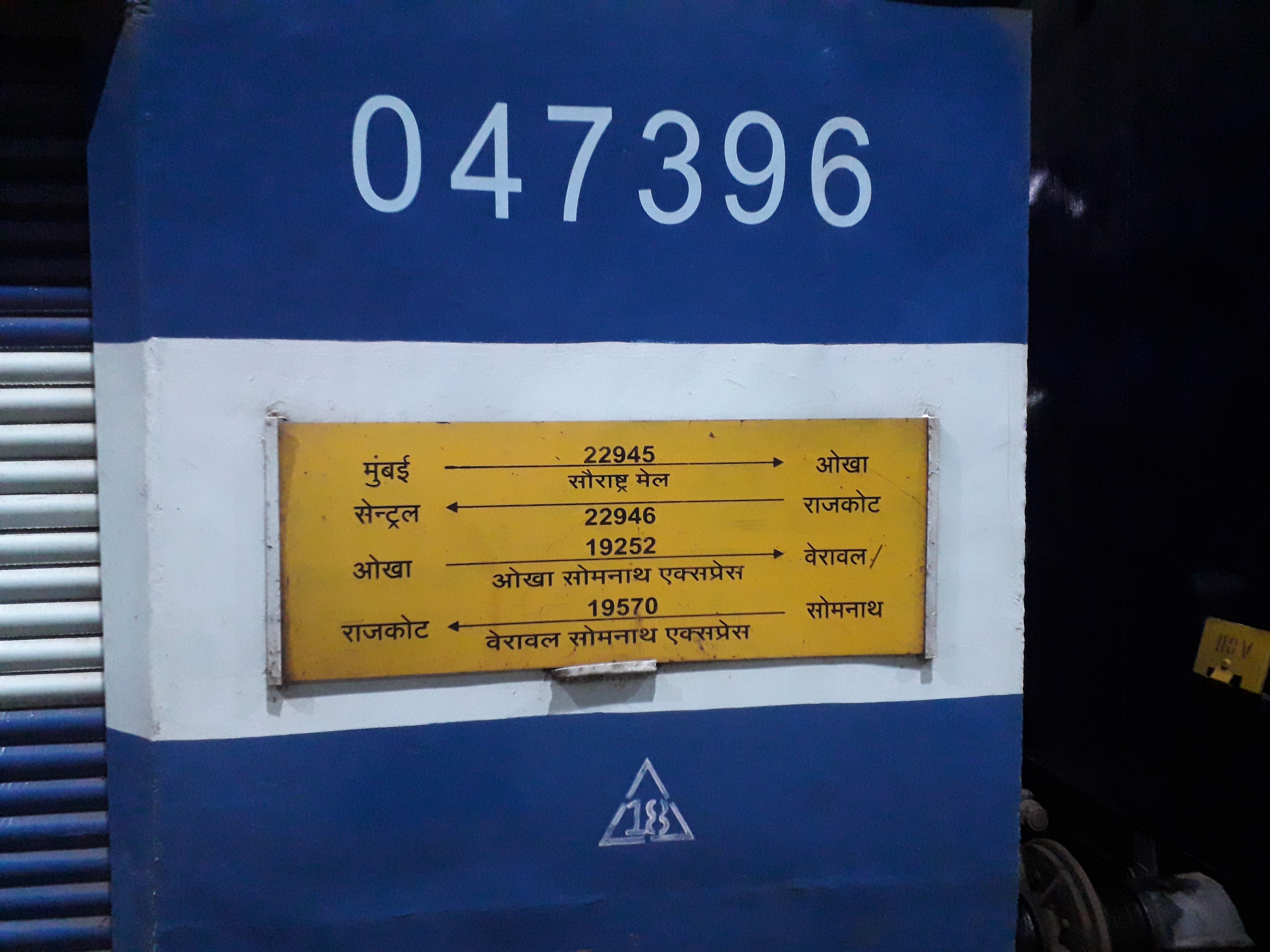

Overview
- Service type: Mail
- First service: 1 October 1925; 101 years ago
- Current operator: Western Railways

Route
- Termini: Mumbai Central (MMCT); Okha (OKHA)
- Stops: 29
- Distance travelled: 990 km (615 mi)
- Average journey time: 17 hours 50 minutes
- Service frequency: Daily
- Train number: 22945 / 22946

On-board services
- Classes: AC 1st Class, AC 2 tier, AC 3 tier, Sleeper class, General Unreserved
- Seating arrangements: Yes
- Sleeping arrangements: Yes
- Catering facilities: On-board catering, E-catering
- Observation facilities: Large windows

Technical
- Rolling stock: LHB coach
- Track gauge: 1,676 mm (5 ft 6 in)
- Operating speed: 56 km/h (35 mph) average including halts
Route map
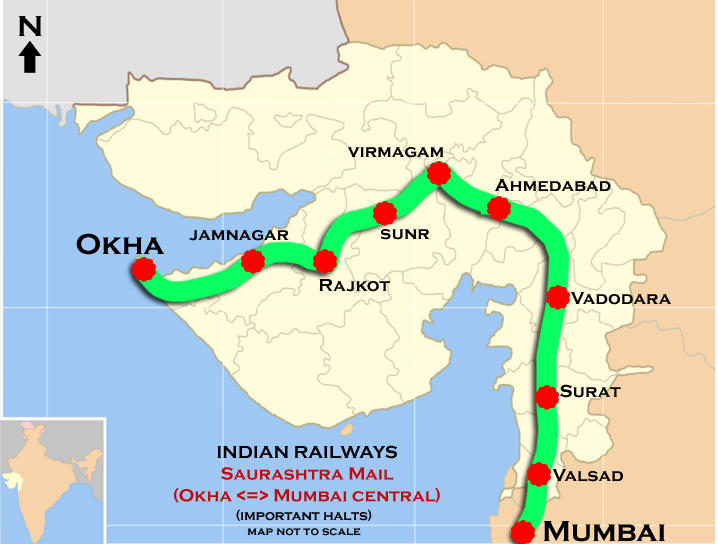

The 22945 / 22946 Mumbai Central–Okha Saurashtra Mail is an Express train belonging to Indian Railways – Western Railway zone that runs between Mumbai Central and Okha in India.

It operates as train number 22945 from Mumbai Central to Okha and as train number 22946 in the reverse direction, serving the state of Maharashtra & Gujarat.

== Coaches ==
The 22945 / 46 Mumbai Central–Okha Saurashtra Mail presently has 1 Dedicated AC 1st Class, 3 AC 2 tier, 4 AC 3 tier,2 AC 3 tier economy, 6 Sleeper class, 4 General Unreserved and 2 EOG (End-On-Generation cum luggage car) coaches. It does not have a pantry car.

As is customary with most train services in India, coach composition may be amended at the discretion of Indian Railways depending on demand.

== Service ==
The 22945 Mumbai Central–Okha Saurashtra Mail covers the distance of 990 kilometres in 17 hours 50 mins (55.21 km/h) & in 17 hours 50 mins as 22946 Okha–Mumbai Central Saurashtra Mail (55.80 km/h).

As the average speed of the train is above 55 km/h, as per Indian Railways rules, its fare includes a Mail surcharge.

== Routeing ==
The 22945 / 22946 Mumbai Central–Okha Saurashtra Mail runs from Mumbai Central via Palghar, Surat, Vadodara Junction, Ahmedabad Junction, Rajkot Junction, Jamnagar to Okha.

== Gallery ==
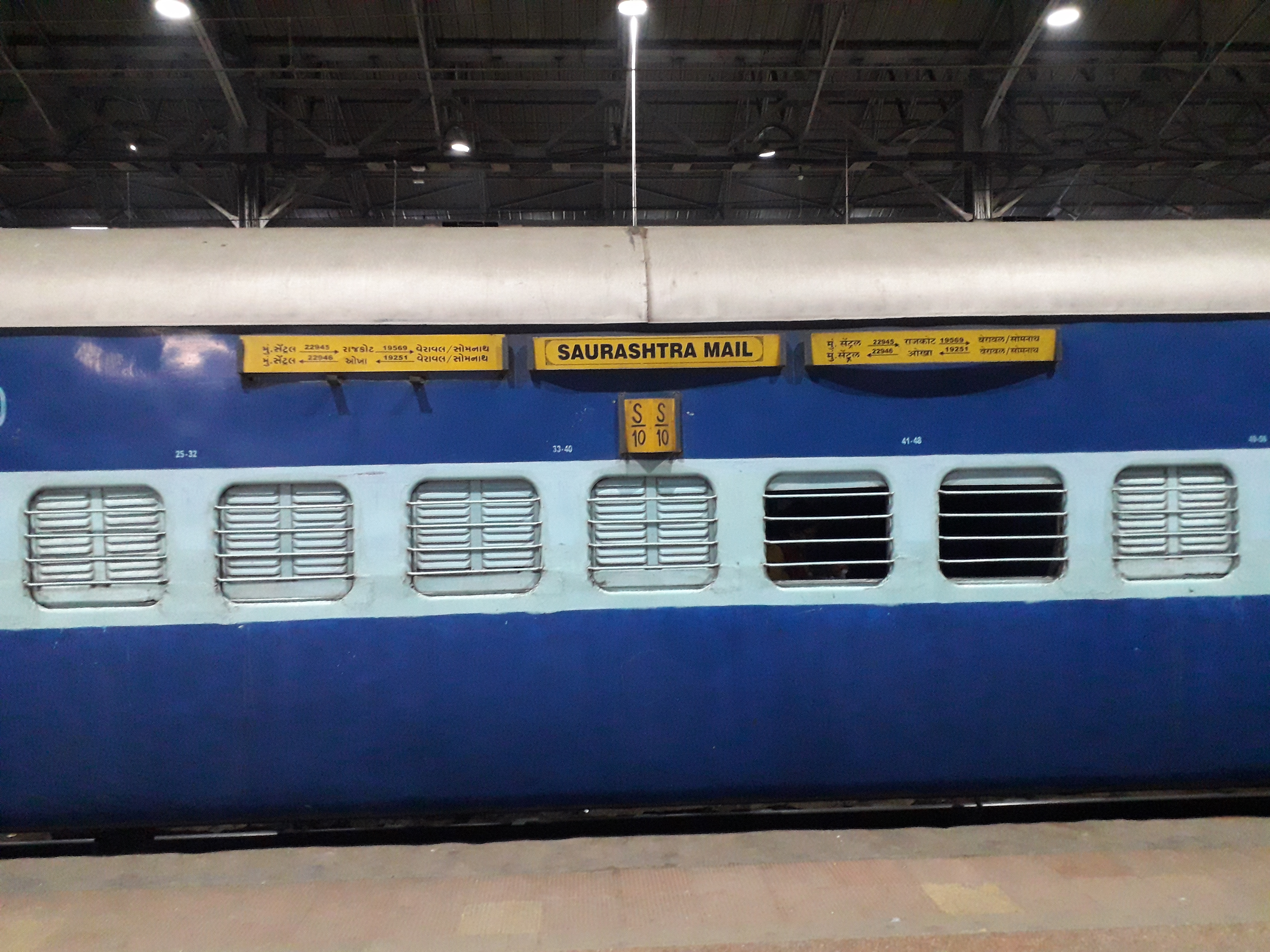
22945 Saurashtra Mail – Sleeper class coach

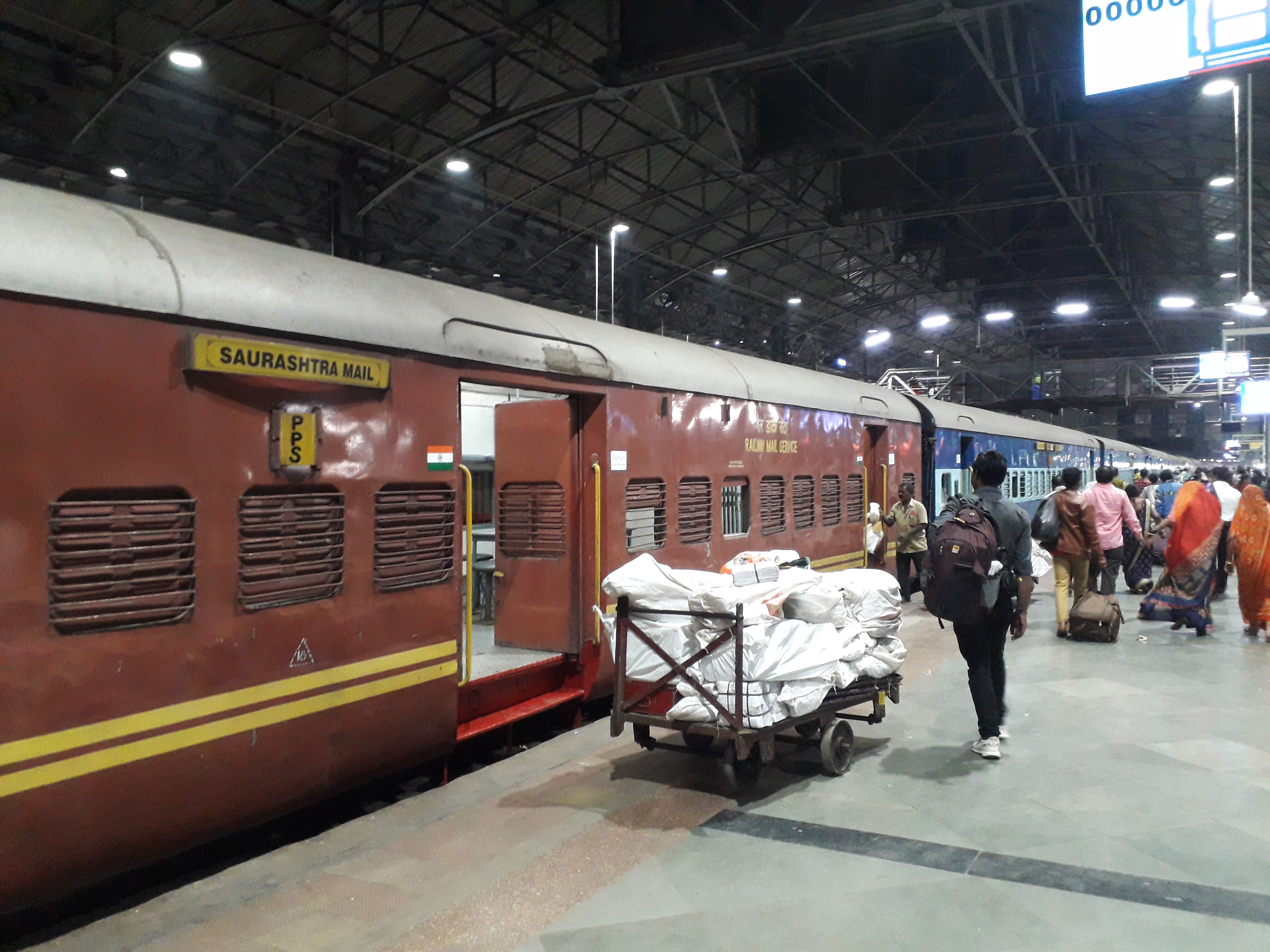
22945 Saurashtra Mail – RMS coach

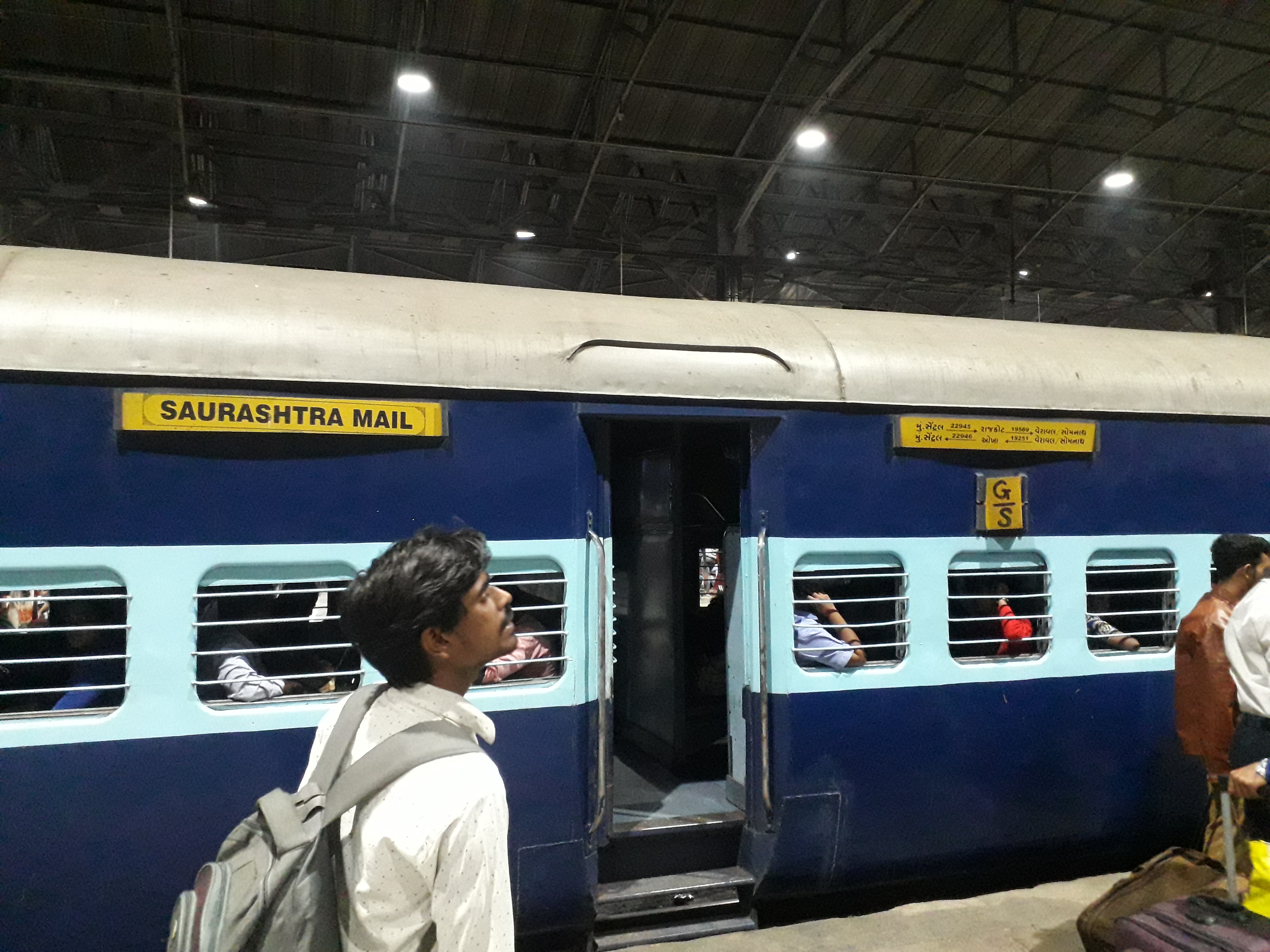
22945 Saurashtra Mail – General coach

== Schedule ==
Train number	Station code	Departure station	Departure time	Departure day	Arrival station	Arrival time	Arrival day
22945	MMCT	Mumbai Central	21:05 PM	Daily	Okha	14:55 PM	Daily
22946	OKHA	Okha	11:05 AM	Daily	Mumbai Central	04:55 AM	Daily

== Traction ==
Prior to February 2012, dual-traction Valsad-based WCAM-1 locomotives would haul the train between Mumbai Central & Ahmedabad Junction handing over to a Ratlam or Vatva-based WDM-3A locomotive or WAM-4 for the remainder of the journey.

Western Railway completed DC electric conversion to AC on 5 February 2012 & it is now regularly hauled by a Vadodara-based WAP-4E / WAP-5 locomotive for the entire journey.
