= Viramgam–Okha line =

Railway line in Gujarat, India

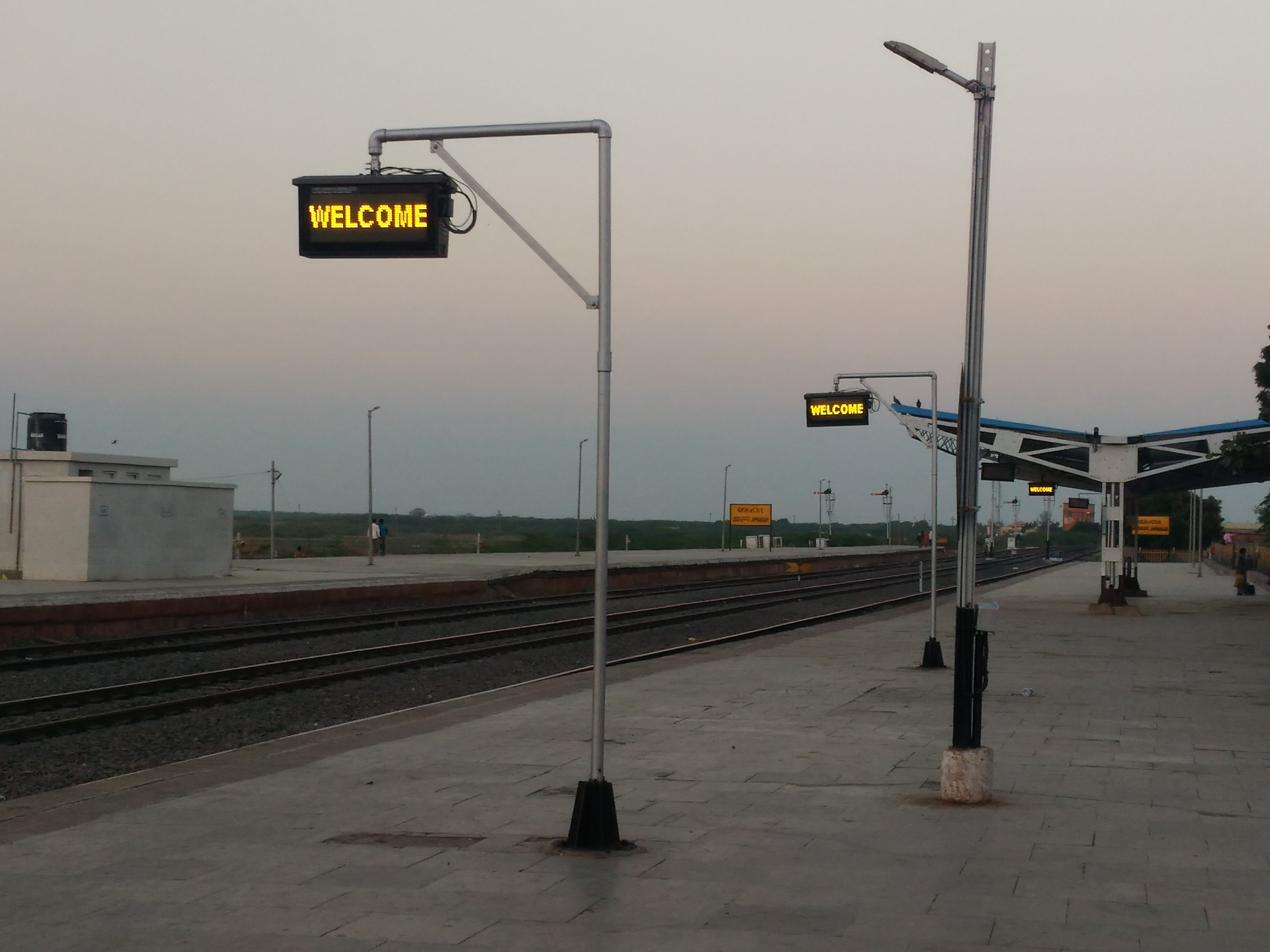
- Jamnagar, an important railway station on Viramgam–Okha line

Overview
- Status: Operational
- Owner: Indian Railways
- Locale: Gujarat
- Termini: Viramgam; Okha

Service
- Type: Regional rail Light rail
- Operator: Western Railway zone

History
- Opened: 1922; 104 years ago

Technical
- Track length: 433 km (269 mi)
- Number of tracks: 2 (between Rajkot and Viramgam) 1 (between Rajkot and Okha)
- Track gauge: 5 ft 6 in (1,676 mm) broad gauge
- Electrification: Yes
- Operating speed: 100 kilometres per hour (62 mph)

The Viramgam–Okha line is a railway passing through Gujarat state, in western India. Which is branch of Gandhidham–Ahmedabad main line that connects Ahmedabad with major cities like Rajkot, Jamnagar, Surendranagar, Dwarka and also produces branch line for Bhavnagar, Junagadh, Morbi, Veraval and Porbander. Recently it has been fully electrified and there is double line section up to Rajkot.

== Geography ==
The Viramgam–Okha line passes through Central part of Gujarat connecting Surendranagar, Wankaner Junction, Rajkot and Jamnagar. It covers a distance of 433 kilometres (269 mi) in Gujarat. It is explained in detailed in sections:

1. Viramgam–Surendra Nagar section
2. Wankaner–Surendra Nagar section
3. Rajkot–Wankaner section

== History ==
Viramgam–Okha section was laid by a number of Princely States and is initially a metre-gauge line. Ahmedabad–Viramgam section was opened by Bombay, Baroda and Central India Railway by 1871 and was extended to Wadhwan by 1872. Surendra Nagar–Rajkot section was opened by Morvi State Railway in 1890. Rajkot–Jamnagar line was opened by 1897, and Jamnagar–Okha section was opened in 1922 by Jamnagar & Dwarka Railway. Rajkot–Junagadh-Veraval section was merged with Saurashtra Railway in April 1948. Saurashtra Railway was merged into Western Railway on 5 November 1951. Gauge conversion of Viramgam–Hapa section completed on 17 June 1980 and Hapa–Okha section by 24 April 1984 by Indian Railways.
