= Jamnagar railway station =

Railway station in Gujarat, India

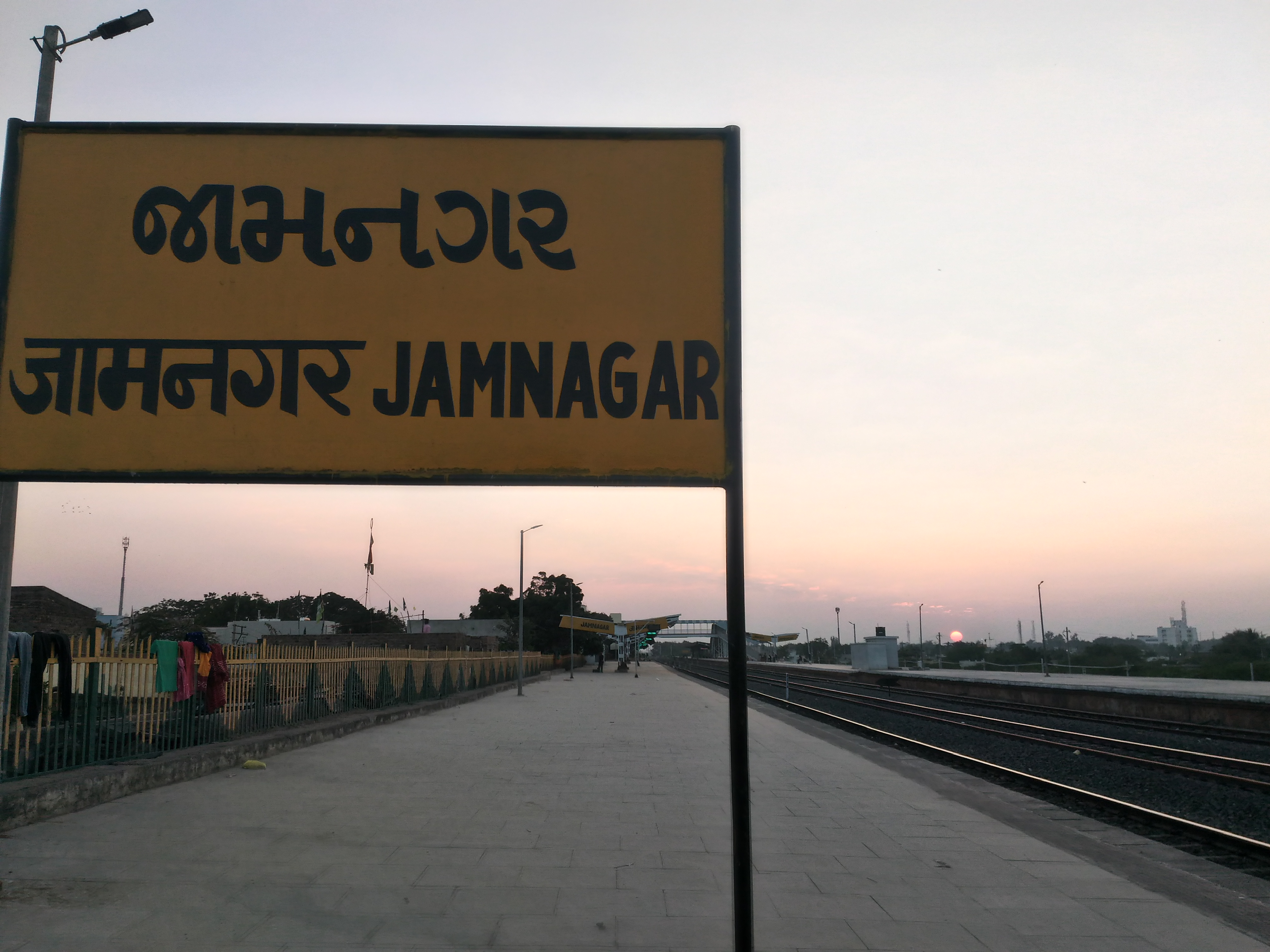
- In 2018 Platform of Jamnagar railway station at dusk

General information
- Location: Jamnagar, Gujarat; India
- Coordinates: 22°29′35″N 70°03′13″E
- Elevation: 12 m (39 ft)
- System: Indian Railways station
- Owner: Indian Railways
- Operator: Western Railway
- Lines: Viramgam–Okha line Jamnagar–Porbandar line
- Platforms: 3
- Tracks: 4

Construction
- Structure type: Standard
- Parking: Yes

Other information
- Status: Functioning
- Station code: JAM
- Zone(s): Western Railway
- Division(s): Rajkot

History
- Opened: 1897
- Former names: Jamnagar & Dwarka Railway
Route map
- Source:Google Maps; 59503 Viramgam–Okha Passenger
Location
- Location within India Location within Gujarat

Jamnagar railway station is the main railway station in the city of Jamnagar in Gujarat, India. It is located in the Western Railways zone of Rajkot Division. Jamnagar railway station is connected to various parts of India by long-distance trains. Hapa is another railway station located on the eastern outskirts of Jamnagar.

== History ==
Jamnagar railway station was owned by Jamnagar & Dwarka Railway during Princely rule. The Rajkot–Jamnagar line was opened by 1897 and the Jamnagar–Okha section was opened in 1922 by Jamnagar & Dwaraka Railway. Jamnagar & Dwarka Railway was merged into Saurashtra Railway in April 1948. Saurashtra Railway was merged into Western Railway on 5 November 1951. Gauge conversion of Viramgam–Hapa section were completed by 1980 and on the Hapa–Okha section by 1984 by Indian Railways. It has seven daily trains and many weekly trains to various parts of India.

== Trains ==
A total of 48 trains halt at Jamnagar railway station in both directions.

=== Originating trains ===
Train no.	Train name	Destination
12477 / 12478	Jamnagar–Shri Mata Vaishno Devi Katra Superfast Express	Shri Mata Vaishno Devi Katra
19577 / 19578	Tirunelveli–Jamnagar Express	Tirunelveli
22923 / 22924	Bandra Terminus–Jamnagar Humsafar Express	Bandra Terminus
22959 / 22960	Vadodara-Jamnagar Intercity express	Vadodara
22925/ 22926	Jamnagar-Ahmedabad Vande Bharat Express	Ahmedabad

== Facilities ==
Jamnagar railway station has an ATM run by the State Bank of India. It has numerous stalls selling packed foods, flavoured milk, ice creams and other hot snacks. It also has a dormitory for passengers looking to stay overnight. There is an air conditioned waiting room for passengers with 3AC or higher tickets. It has an escalator in PF No.1 to facilitate movement of personnel and luggages. Work for second foot overbridge is in progress.
