= Dahinsara Junction railway station =

Railway station in Gujarat, India

General information
- Location: Dahinsara, Morbi district India
- Coordinates: 22°57′21″N 70°37′07″E
- System: Indian Railways station
- Owner: Ministry of Railways, Indian Railways
- Operator: Western Railway
- Line: Maliya Miyana–Wankaner section
- Platforms: 2
- Tracks: 2

Construction
- Structure type: Standard (on ground)
- Parking: No

Other information
- Status: Functioning
- Station code: DAC
- Zone(s): Western Railway
- Division(s): Rajkot
Location
- Location within India Location within Gujarat

Dahinsara Junction railway station is a railway station on the Western Railway network in the state of Gujarat, India. Dahinsara Junction railway station is 27 km from Morbi railway station. Passenger trains halt here. Navlakhi Port is well connected to Dahinsara Junction by rail.

== See also ==
- Morbi district
