= Chandlodiya railway station =

Railway station in Gujarat, India

Chandlodiya railway station

General information
- Location: Chandlodiya, Ahmedabad; India
- Coordinates: 23°04′30″N 72°32′38″E
- Elevation: 59 metres (194 ft)
- System: Indian Railway Station
- Owner: Ministry of Railways, Indian Railways
- Operator: Western Railway
- Line: Gandhidham - Ahmedabad main line
- Platforms: 2 (CLDY) and 2 (CBCC)
- Tracks: 3 (CLDY) and 2 (CBCC)
- Connections: AMTS

Construction
- Structure type: Standard (On Ground)
- Parking: No

Other information
- Status: Functioning
- Station code: CLDY
- Zone(s): Western Railway
- Division(s): Ahmedabad
Location
- Location within Ahmedabad Location within Gujarat Location within India

Chandlodiya railway station is a railway station in Ahmedabad district, Gujarat, India on the Western line of the Western railway network. It serves Chandlodiya area of Ahmedabad city. Chandlodiya railway station is 10 km from Ahmedabad Junction. Passenger, Express, and Superfast trains halt here. Its station code is CLDY.

== Nearby stations ==
Ambli road is the nearest railway station towards Viramgam Junction, whereas Sabarmati Junction is the nearest railway station towards Ahmedabad Junction. The other part of Chandlodiya railway station is Chandlodiya B on the Mehsana line.

== Chandlodiya B Railway station ==
The Chandlodiya B Cabin railway station, designated by the code CBCC, is located approximately 1 kilometer from the Chandlodiya railway station. Situated on the Jaipur-Ahmedabad and Viramgam-Khodiyar lines, this station features two platforms and three tracks. It is a strategic junction for trains traveling from Saurashtra and Kutch towards Delhi, Rajasthan, and Uttar Pradesh offering a time-saving route that bypasses both Ahmedabad Junction and Sabarmati Junction. Notable trains passing through this station include:

- Gandhinagar Capital - Indore Shanti Express
- Ala Hazrat Express (via Ahmedabad)
- Porbandar–Delhi Sarai Rohilla Superfast Express
- Porbandar–Muzaffarpur Express
- Anand - Gandhinagar MEMU

== Trains ==
The following Express and Superfast trains halt at Chandlodiya railway station in both directions:

- Mumbai Central - Porbandar Saurashtra Express
- Somnath - Jabalpur Express (via Itarsi)
- Somnath - Jabalpur Express (via Bina)
- Mumbai Central - Okha Saurashtra Mail
- Gorakhpur - Okha Express
- Ahmedabad - Bhuj Namo Bharat Rapid Rail
- Vadodara - Jamnagar Intercity Superfast Express
- Ahmedabad - Viramgam MEMU
