= Sabarmati (Ahmedabad)–Okha Vande Bharat Express =

Mini Vande Bharat Express train route in India

Sabarmati (Ahmedabad) - Okha Vande Bharat Express
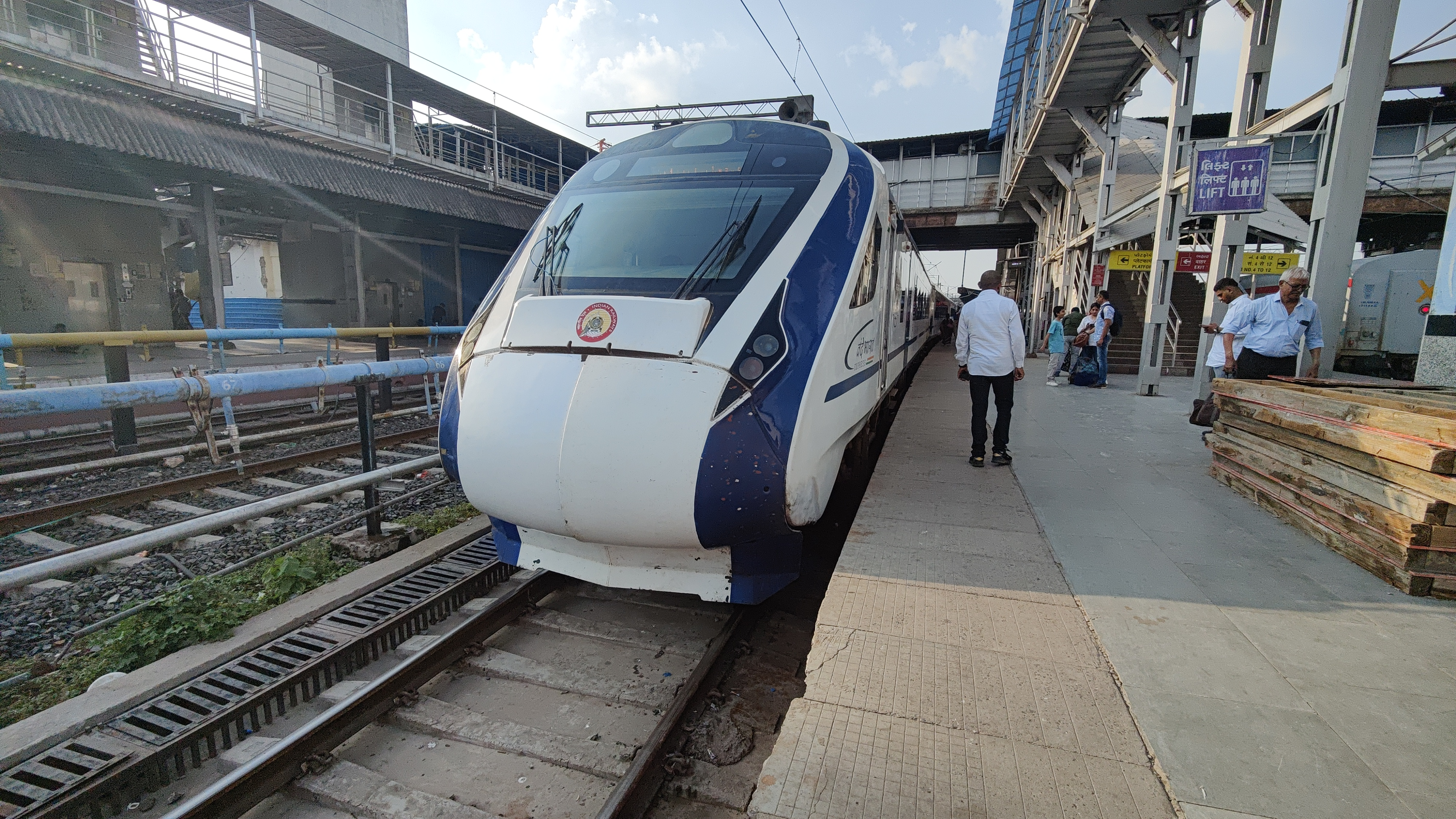

Overview
- Service type: Vande Bharat Express
- Locale: Gujarat
- First service: September 24, 2023 (Inaugural run); 25 September 2023; 2 years ago (Commercial run)
- Current operator: Western Railway (WR)

Route
- Termini: Sabarmati Junction (SBT); Okha (OKHA)
- Stops: 8
- Distance travelled: 493 km (306 mi)
- Average journey time: 07 hrs
- Service frequency: Six days a week (Note: Except Tuesdays)
- Train number: 22925 / 22926
- Lines used: Ahmedabad–Viramgam section; Viramgam–Okha line

On-board services
- Classes: AC Chair Car, AC Executive Chair Car
- Seating arrangements: Airline style; Rotatable seats
- Sleeping arrangements: No
- Catering facilities: On board Catering
- Observation facilities: Large windows in all coaches
- Entertainment facilities: On-board WiFi; Infotainment System; Electric outlets; Reading light; Seat Pockets; Bottle Holder; Tray Table
- Baggage facilities: Overhead racks
- Other facilities: Kavach

Technical
- Rolling stock: Mini Vande Bharat 2.0
- Track gauge: Indian gauge 1,676 mm (5 ft 6 in) broad gauge
- Electrification: 25 kV 50 Hz AC Overhead line
- Operating speed: 70 km/h (43 mph) (Avg.)
- Average length: 192 metres (630 ft) (08 coaches)
- Track owner: Indian Railways
- Rake maintenance: Sabarmati Jn (SBT)

The 22925/22926 Sabarmati (Ahmedabad) - Okha Vande Bharat Express is India's 34th Vande Bharat Express train, connecting the city of Ahmedabad with Okha in Gujarat. This train was inaugurated on 24 September 2023 by Prime Minister Narendra Modi via video conference from New Delhi between Sabarmati Junction and Jamnagar, which was later extended to Okha on 12 March 2024 and terminal changed to Sabarmati Junction on August 17, 2026.

== Overview ==
This train is operated by Indian Railways, connecting Sabarmati Jn, Ambli Road, Sanand, Viramgam Jn, Surendranagar Jn, Wankaner Jn, Rajkot Jn, Jamnagar, Dwarka and Okha. It is currently operated with train numbers 22925/22926 on 6 days a week basis.

== Rakes ==
It is the thirty-second 2nd Generation and twentieth Mini Vande Bharat 2.0 Express train which was designed and manufactured by the Integral Coach Factory at Perambur, Chennai under the Make in India Initiative.

== Service ==
The 22925/22926 Sabarmati (Ahmedabad) - Okha Vande Bharat Express operates six days a week except Tuesdays, covering a distance of 493 km (306 mi) in a travel time of 7 hours with an average speed of 70 km/h (43 mph). The service has 8 intermediate stops. The Maximum Permissible Speed is 110 km/h (68 mph).

== See also ==
- Vande Bharat Express
- Tejas Express
- Gatimaan Express
- Sabarmati Junction railway station
- Okha railway station
