= Rajkot–Wankaner section =

Railway line in Gujarat, India

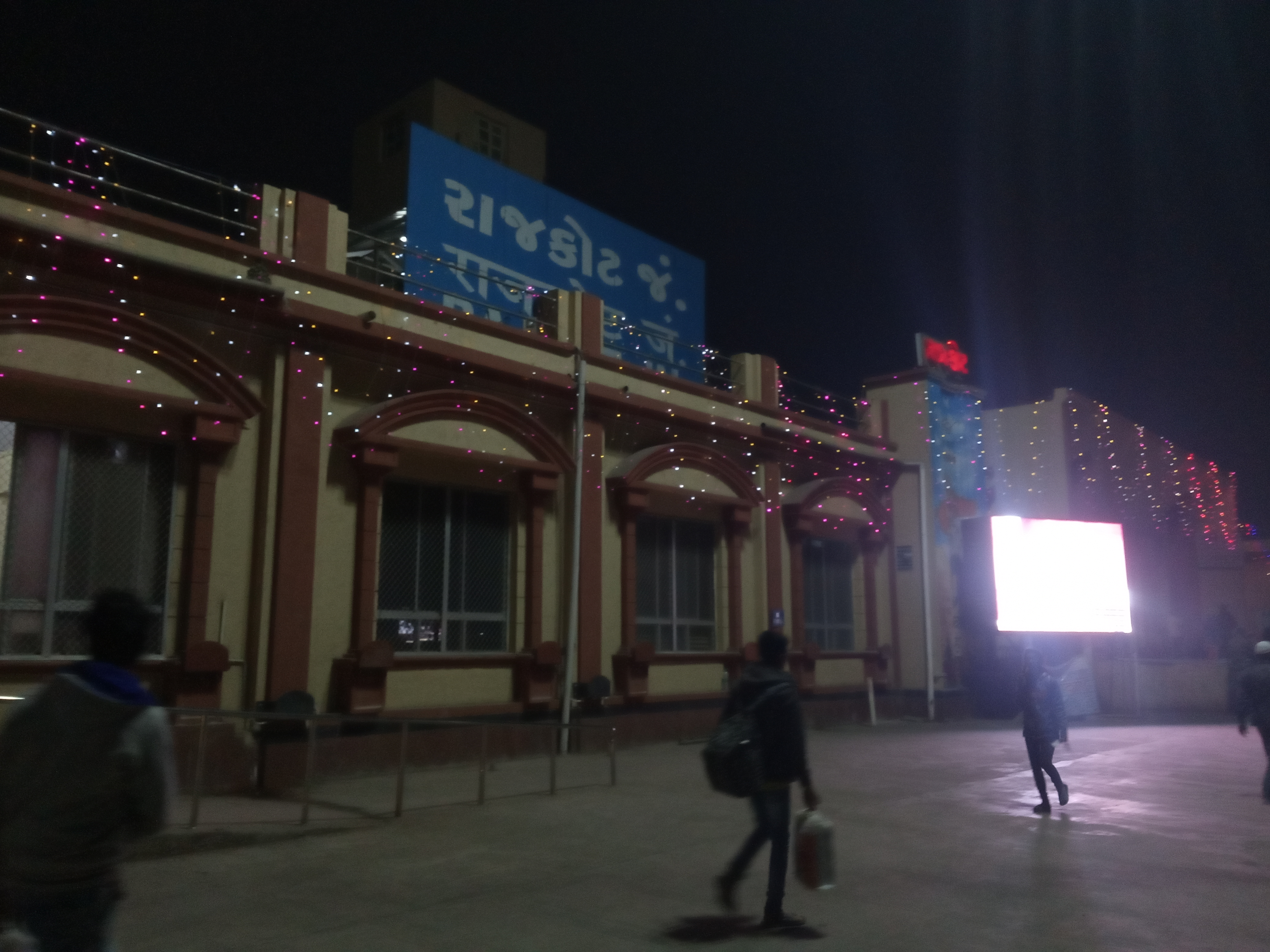
- Rajkot Junction the starting station on Rajkot–Wankaner section

Overview
- Status: Operational
- Owner: Indian Railways
- Locale: Gujarat
- Termini: Rajkot; Wankaner

Service
- Operator(s): Western Railway

History
- Opened: 1890

Technical
- Track length: 42 km (26 mi)
- Number of tracks: 1
- Track gauge: 5 ft 6 in (1,676 mm) broad gauge

The Rajkot–Wankaner section belongs to Western Railway of Rajkot Division in Gujarat State.

== History ==
The Maliya Miyana–Wankaner section was laid as a 2 ft 6inch roadside tramway in the year 1890 by Morvi State Railway. Wadhwan–Rajkot metre gauge section of Morvi State Railway laid in the year 1890. Sir Lakhdhiraji Waghji, who ruled from 1922 until 1948. Sir Waghji acted as a ruler, manager, patron and policeman of the state with great authority. Sir Waghji, like other contemporary rulers of Saurashtra, built roads and a railway network (of seventy miles), connecting Wadhwan and Morbi and the two small ports of Navlakhi and Vavania, for exporting the state's production of salt and cloth. Later Maliya Miyana–Wankaner section was converted to metre gauge between 1905 and 1930s. Rajkot–Wankaner section gauge conversion completed in the year 1924 by Morvi State Railway. Morvi State Railway was merged into the Western Railway on 5 November 1951.

== Freight ==
About 16 express trains pass through this section daily. Goods trains from Porbander and Veraval Port pass through this line.

== Doubling ==
Doubling work on this section is expected to be commenced by December 2016.
