= Sanand railway station =

Railway station in Gujarat, India

Sanand railway station

General information
- Location: Sanand, Gujarat; India
- Coordinates: 23°01′27″N 72°23′05″E
- Elevation: 42 metres (138 ft)
- System: Indian Railways station
- Owner: Ministry of Railways, Indian Railways
- Operator: Western Railway
- Lines: Gandhidham–Ahmedabad main line Viramgam–Okha line
- Platforms: 3
- Tracks: 3

Construction
- Structure type: Standard (on ground)
- Parking: No

Other information
- Status: Functioning
- Station code: SAU
- Zone(s): Western Railway
- Division(s): Ahmedabad
Location
- Location within India Location within Gujarat Location within Ahmedabad

Sanand railway station is a railway station in Ahmedabad district, Gujarat, India on the Western line of the Western railway network. Sanand railway station is 28 km from Ahmedabad Junction. Two Passenger, two Express, and one Superfast trains halt here. Sanand is known for Sanand Plant (Tata Motors).

== Nearby stations ==
Vasan Iyawa is the nearest railway station towards Viramgam Junction, whereas Goraghuma is the nearest railway station towards Ahmedabad Junction.

== Trains ==
The following Express and Superfast trains halt at Sanand railway station in both directions:

- 19015/16 Saurashtra Express
- 22945/46 Saurashtra Mail
