= Ambli Road railway station =

Railway station in Gujarat, India

Ambli Road
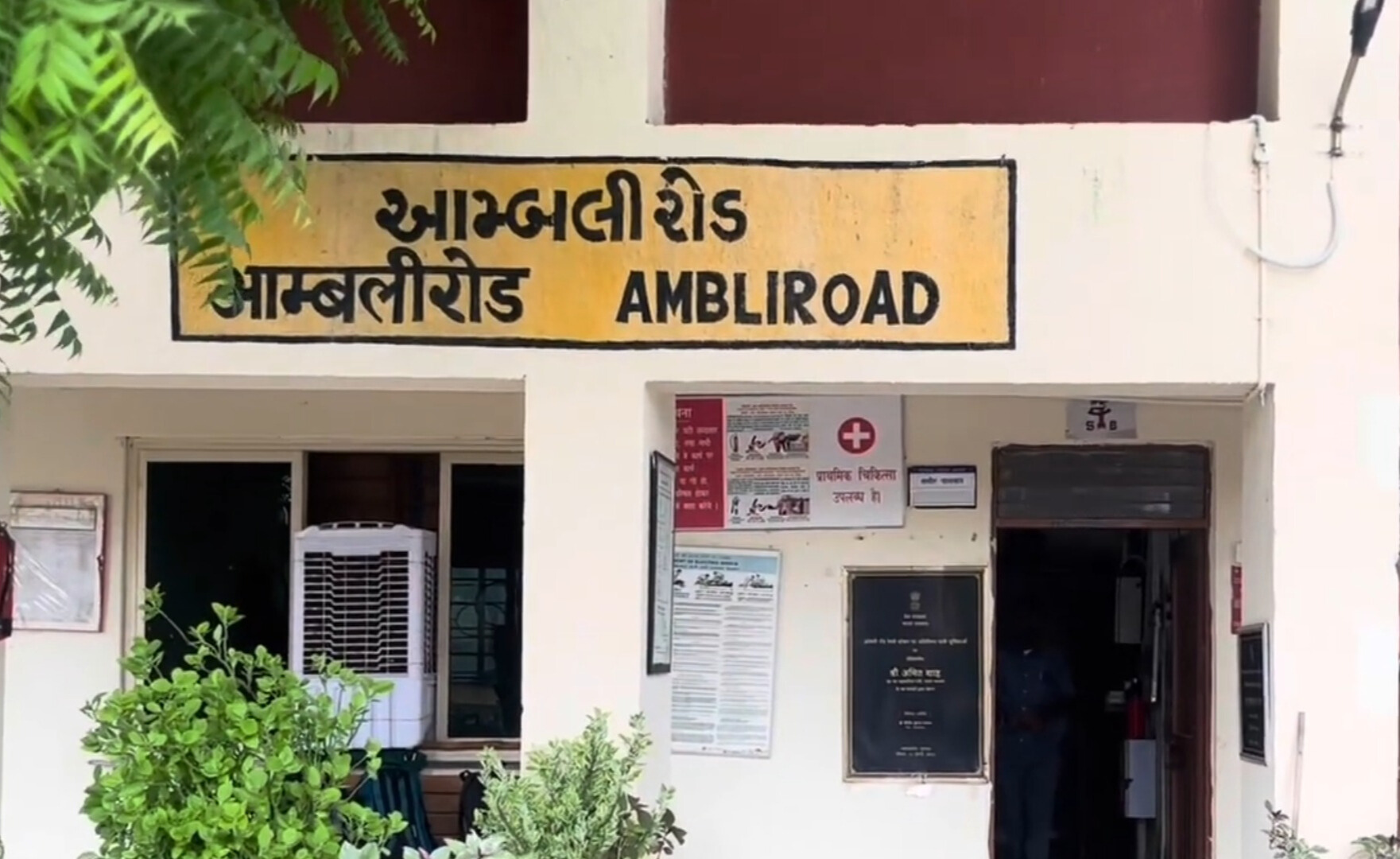
- Entrance station board

General information
- Location: Ambli Road, Ahmedabad, Gujarat; India
- Coordinates: 23.0537°N 72.4932°E
- Elevation: 60 m (200 ft)
- System: Indian Railways station
- Owner: Indian Railways
- Operator: Western Railways
- Line: Gandhidham–Ahmedabad main line
- Platforms: 3
- Tracks: 4

Construction
- Structure type: Standard (on-ground station)
- Parking: Yes
- Cycle facilities: Yes
- Accessible: (Available)

Other information
- Status: Functioning
- Station code: ABD
- Zone(s): Western Railway zone
- Division(s): Ahmedabad

History
- Opened: 1 January 1900

Passengers
- 2023: 1,000 per day (Daily) ▲5% (Unreserved)

Services
Preceding station	Indian Railways	Following station
Chandlodiya towards ?	Western Railway zone	Goraghuma towards ?
Location
- Location within Gujarat Location within India
- Interactive map

Ambli Road railway station (station code: ABD) is a railway station in west of Ahmedabad city. It is operated by Indian Railways under the Western Railway zone. The station facilitates passenger movement, connecting the nearby local town and areas within city along the Western Railway network. Its location along local roadways ensures convenient accessibility for travelers. Over the years, Ambli Road has served as an important stop for commuter trains, supporting daily transportation needs in the region.

== History ==
Ambli Road railway station was established to serve the local population of Ambli and surrounding areas in Gujarat. It became operational as part of the Western Railway expansion aimed at improving connectivity between smaller towns and major cities. Over the years, the station has witnessed gradual development, including platform improvements, electrification, and better passenger amenities. It has played a key role in facilitating daily commuter traffic as well as regional trade, helping in the socio-economic growth of the surrounding region.

== Major trains ==
● Bhavnagar Terminus–MCTM Udhampur Janmabhoomi Express (19107/19108)

● Ahmedabad–Somnath Intercity Express (19119/19120)

● Vadodara–Jamnagar Intercity Superfast Express (22959/22960)

● Ahmedabad–Bhuj Namo Bharat Rapid Rail (94801/94802)
