= Ahmedabad–Bhuj Namo Bharat Rapid Rail =

Namo Bharat Rapid Rail route in India

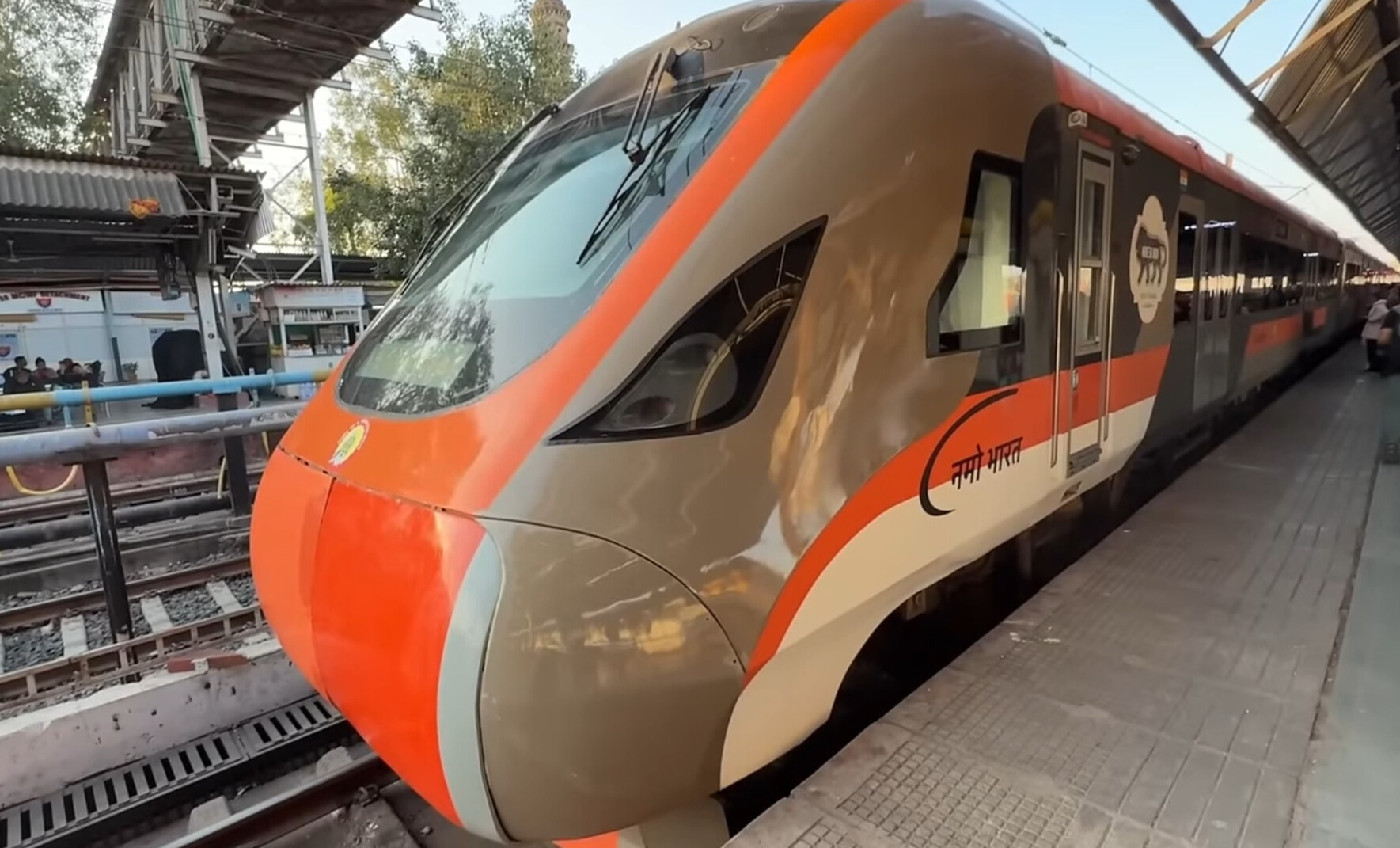
- Namo Bharat standing on Ahmedabad Junction

Overview
- Service type: Inter-city rail, Namo Bharat Rapid Rail
- Status: Active
- Locale: Gujarat
- First service: 16 September 2024; 2 years ago (Inaugural) 17 September 2024; 2 years ago (Commercial)
- Current operator: Western Railway (WR)

Route
- Termini: Ahmedabad Junction (ADI); Bhuj (BHUJ)
- Stops: 13
- Distance travelled: 359 km (223 mi)
- Average journey time: 5h 45m
- Service frequency: Weekly
- Train number: 94801 / 94802

On-board services
- Class: Unreserved AC Chair Car (CC)
- Seating arrangements: Yes
- Sleeping arrangements: No
- Catering facilities: No
- Observation facilities: Wide Windows
- Entertainment facilities: Onboard WiFi; Electric outlets
- Baggage facilities: Overhead racks
- Other facilities: Automatic doors; smoke alarms; bio-vacuum toilets

Technical
- Track gauge: Indian gauge
- Electrification: 25 kV 50 Hz AC overhead line
- Operating speed: 130 km/h (81 mph) maximum 62 km (39 mi) (Avg.)
- Track owner: Indian Railways
- Rake sharing: No

The 94801/94802 Ahmedabad–Bhuj Namo Bharat Rapid Rail is India's 1st semi-high speed Intercity train which connects the Ahmedabad Junction and terminates in Bhuj of Gujarat in India. It categorized under the Vande Metro/Namo Bharat Rapid Rail Network.

The train is inaugurated on 16 September 2024 by Honorable Prime Minister Narendra Modi in Ahmedabad of Gujarat in India.

== Overview ==
The train is operated by Indian Railways, connecting Ahmedabad Junction and Bhuj. It is currently operated with 94801/94802 on weekly basis.

== Rakes ==
The Ahmedabad–Bhuj Namo Bharat Rapid Rail operates with a modern 12–coach formation. The standard configuration is arranged as C1 to C12. All coaches are fully air-conditioned and designed for rapid transit operations under Western Railway. The rake is maintained at the Ahmedabad Junction coaching depot. Coaches include reserved seating and dedicated arrangements for women and senior citizens. The train set uses stainless steel LHB design for enhanced safety and comfort. Maintenance and periodic overhauls are scheduled at Ahmedabad. The capacity of each coach allows for efficient passenger flow on this busy corridor. The formation is designed to provide both comfort and speed for medium-distance travel.

== Schedule ==
Train schedule: Ahmedabad ↔ Bhuj Namo Bharat Rapid Rail
Train no.	Station code	Departure station	Departure time	Departure day	Arrival station	Arrival time	Arrival hours
94801	ADI	Ahmedabad Junction	5:25 PM	Sunday, Monday, Tuesday, Wednesday, Thursday & Friday	Bhuj	11:10 PM	5h 45m
94802	BHUJ	Bhuj	5:15 AM	Monday, Tuesday, Wednesday, Thursday, Friday & Saturday	Ahmedabad Junction	10:50 AM	5h 35m

== Routes and halts ==
Route and halts of Ahmedabad–Bhuj Namo Bharat Rapid Rail (both directions)
Station Name (Ahmedabad → Bhuj) 94801 ↓	Station Name (Bhuj → Ahmedabad) 94802 ↓
Ahmedabad Junction	Bhuj
Sabarmati Junction	Anjar
Chandlodiya	Gandhidham Junction
Ambli Road	Bhachau
Sanand	Samakhiali Junction
Viramgam Junction	Halvad
Dharangadhra Junction	Dhrangadhra Junction
Halvad	Viramgam Junction
Samakhiali Junction	Sanand
Bhachau	Ambli Road
Gandhidham Junction	Chandlodiya
Anjar	Sabarmati Junction
Bhuj	Ahmedabad Junction

== Rake reversal ==
There is no rake reversal.

== See also ==
- Namo Bharat Rapid Rail
- Amrit Bharat Express
- Vande Bharat Express
- Ahmedabad Junction
- Bhuj

== Notes ==
a. Runs 6 days in a week for both directions.
