= Samakhiali–Maliya Miyana section =

Railway line in India

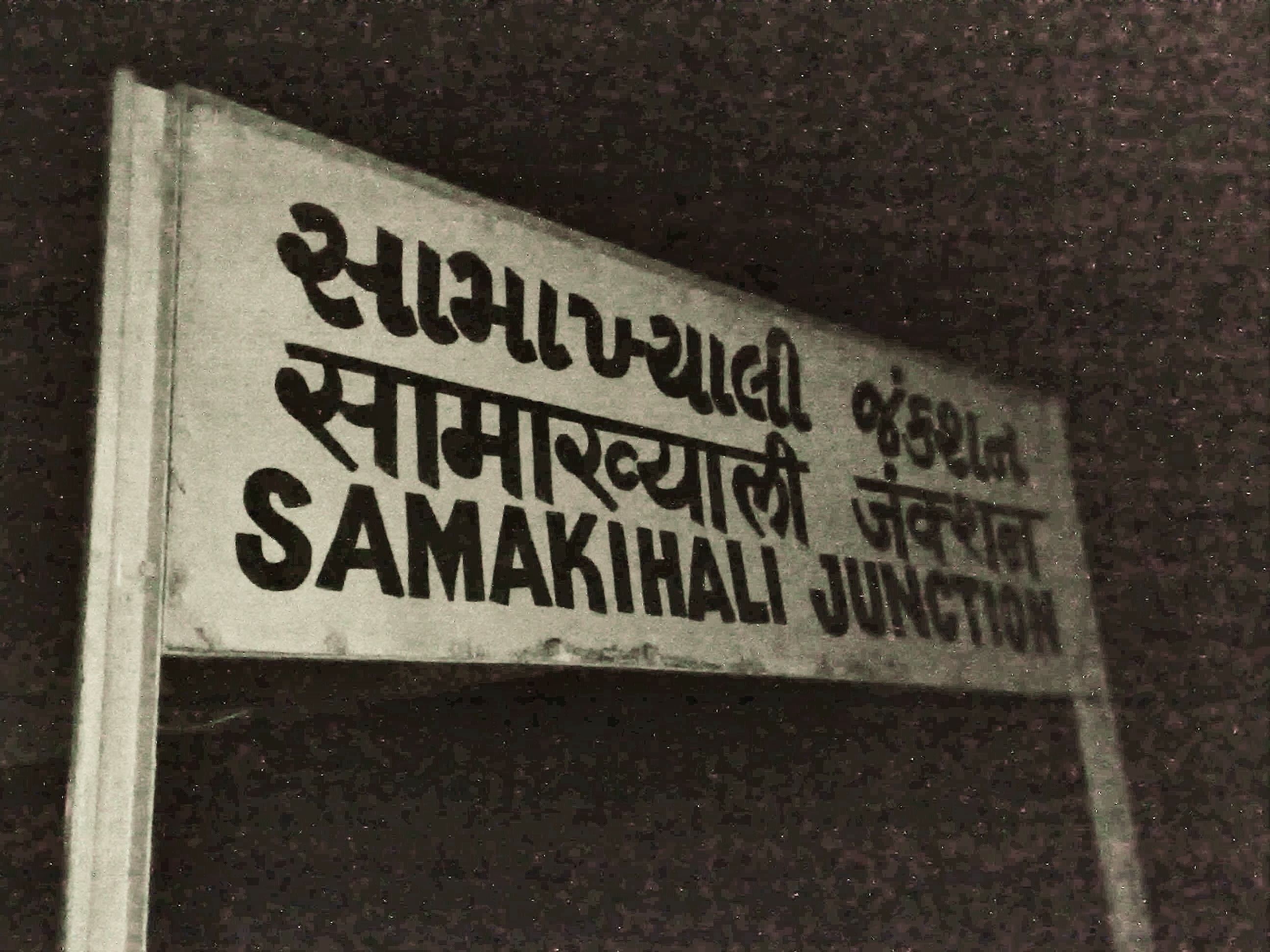
- Samakhiali Junction the starting railway station on Samakhiali–Maliya Miyana section

Overview
- Status: Operational
- Owner: Indian Railways
- Locale: Gujarat
- Termini: Samakhiali; Maliya Miyana

Service
- Operator: Western Railway

History
- Opened: 1969

Technical
- Track length: 39 km (24 mi)
- Number of tracks: 1
- Track gauge: 5 ft 6 in (1,676 mm) broad gauge
- Electrification: Yes
- Operating speed: 100 km/h

The Samakhiali–Maliya Miyana section belongs to Western Railway of Ahmedabad Division.

== Line ==
This line connects Samakhiali and Maliya Miyana. Further from Maliya Miyana, It divides into two sections Maliya Miyana–Viramgam section and Maliya Miyana–Wankaner section. About five express trains pass through this line daily. This is an important line for freight service to Kandla Port and Mundra Port. Later in October 2011, a goods train with 120 wagons plied on this section.
