= Gandhidham–Ahmedabad main line =

Railway line in India

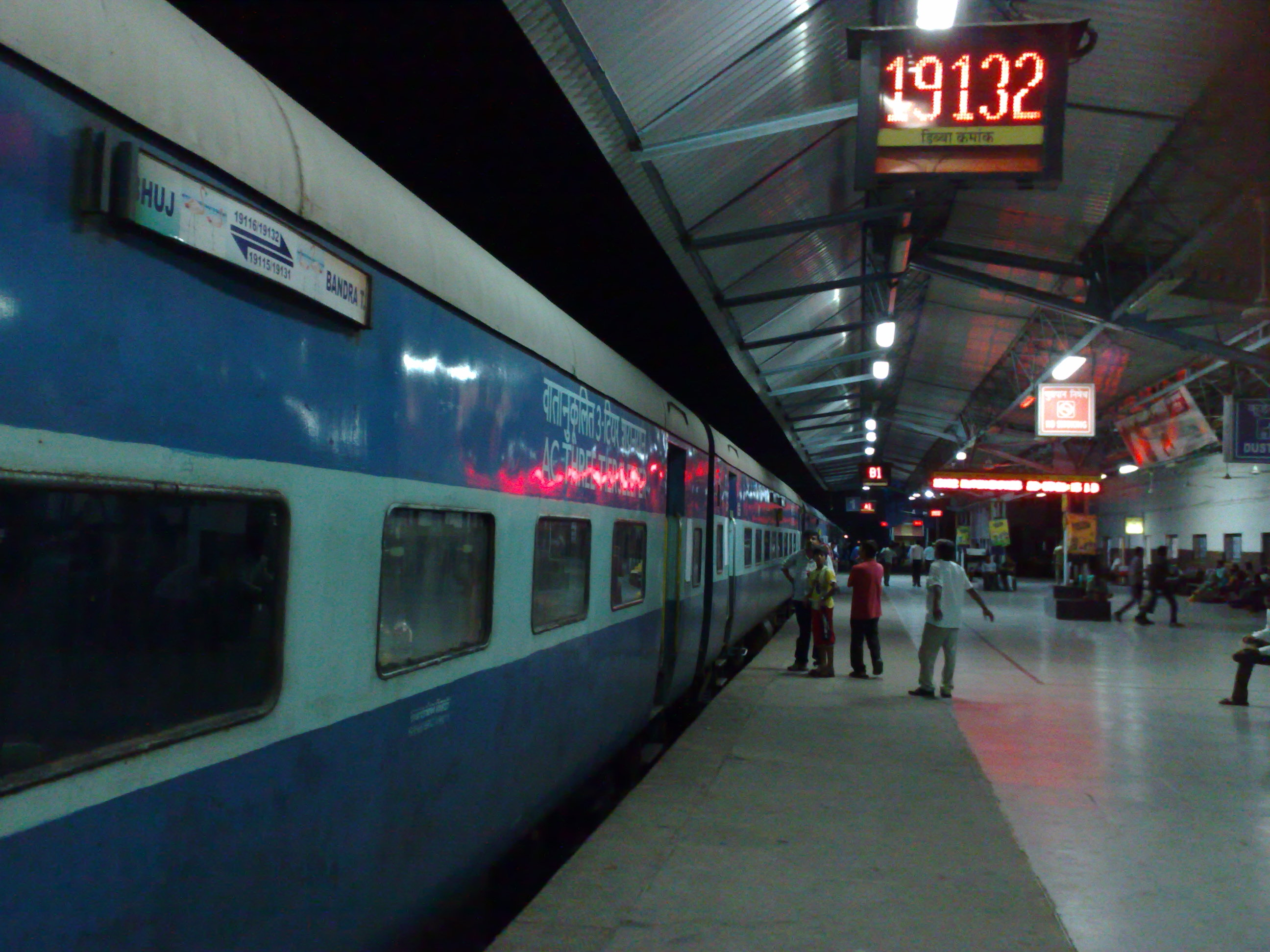
- Kutch Express, an important train on Gandhidham–Ahmedabad main line

Overview
- Status: Operational
- Owner: Indian Railways
- Locale: Gujarat
- Termini: Gandhidham; Ahmedabad
- Stations: Samakhiali, Viramgam

Service
- Operator: Western Railway

History
- Opened: 1969

Technical
- Line length: 299.2 km (186 mi)
- Number of tracks: 1
- Track gauge: 5 ft 6 in (1,676 mm) broad gauge
- Electrification: Yes
- Operating speed: 100 km/h

The Gandhidham–Ahmedabad main line belongs to Western Railway of Ahmedabad Division in Gujarat State.

== Geography ==
Gandhidham–Ahmedabad main line passes through beautiful Creeks and Salt dunes of Kutch. The railway line is about 300 km in length. This line is known in detail different sections:

- Gandhidham–Samakhiali section
- Samakhiali–Maliya Miyana section
- Maliya Miyana–Viramgam section
- Viramgam–Ahmedabad section

== History ==
Between 1850 and 1950 Gandhidham–Ahmedabad line was owned by different Princely States like Cutch State Railway, Bombay, Baroda and Central India Railway, Morvi State Railway. Ahmedabad–Viramgam section was laid in 1871 by BB&CI. Later BB&CI line was extended to Wadhwan. The Cutch State Railway was financed by the Maharao Khengarji Bawa of Cutch, and the initial section to Anjar was opened in 1905. An extension from Anjar to the state capital of Bhuj was later made and lines opened in 1908. Varshamedi to Bhachau was opened in 1910. 15 miles from Anjar to Kandla was opened in 1930. After the formation of Gandhidham, Kandla station was renamed in 1947. Another line was laid from Kandla to Disa in 1950.

== Railway reorganization ==
Cutch State Railway was merged into the Western Railway on 5 November 1951, at which time the total length was 72 miles. The foundation stone was laid on 7 April 1955 to Gandhidham Bg railway station. The Gandhidham–Ahmedabad line was complete in the year 1969. Gauge conversion of Viramgam–Wankaner–Gandhidham section was completed in the earlier 1980s. The first train from Gandhidham to Mumbai was introduced on 2 October 1984.

== Passenger movement ==
This line passes through Samakhiali, Maliya Miyana railway station, Dharangadhra and Viramgam. Passengers of Kutch are benefited through this line to go to rest of the parts of India. There are trains to some important cities like Mumbai, Bangalore, Visakhapatnam, Kamakhya Junction, Nagercoil Junction, Pune, Delhi Junction, Howrah, Kolkata, Vijayawada, Nagpur and Puri
