= Namo Bharat Rapid Rail =

Series of Indian inter-city express train services

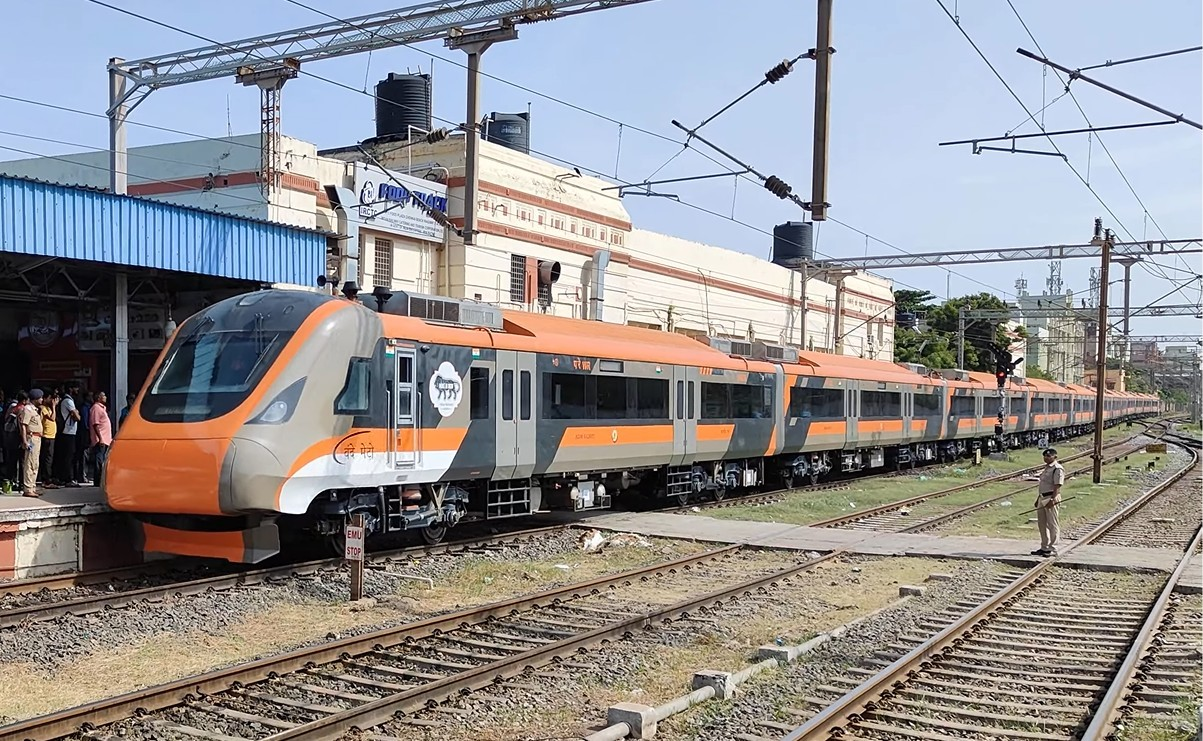
- Namo Bharat Rapid Rail on its trial run

Overview
- Service type: Inter-city rail
- Status: Operating
- Predecessor: MEMU
- Website: indianrail.gov.in

Route
- Distance travelled: 100–250 km (62–155 mi)
- Line used: 2

On-board services
- Seating arrangements: Yes
- Catering facilities: No
- Observation facilities: Wide windows
- Baggage facilities: Overhead racks
- Other facilities: Automatic doors; smoke alarms; bio-vacuum toilets

Technical
- Track gauge: 1,676 mm (5 ft 6 in)
- Electrification: 25 kV 50 Hz AC via Overhead line
- Operating speed: 130 km/h (81 mph) (maximum)
- Average length: 8–16 Coaches

Namo Bharat Rapid Rail (also referred to as Vande Metro) is a short-distance service that operates on an inter-city rail network to connect major cities within a distance of around 100–250 km (62–155 mi). The Rail Coach Factory, Kapurthala had rolled out the first Basic Unit (4 coaches) of the train in April 2024. This train is part of the 'Make in India' initiative by the Government of India and entered commercial service in September 2024.

== History ==
=== Announcement ===
Following the success of the Vande Bharat Express in the medium-distance segment, Namo Bharat Rapid Rail as Vande Metro was first announced by then Minister of Railways Ashwini Vaishnav in April 2023 as a short-distance version intended for regional travel.

=== Trial runs ===
With the trainsets getting into the final stages, trial runs for the trainsets were scheduled for July 2024. These trials were to be focused on metropolitan cities, satellite cities, and large urban centres.

A successful trial run was conducted on 3 August 2024 which ran from Chennai's Villivakkam railway station and terminated at Katpadi Junction.

Another trial run was conducted on 8 September 2024 which ran from Ahmedabad Jn. railway station to Bhuj railway station. During the trial run, the train covered the distance in five hours, one and a half hours less than then-operational trains. During the trial, the train achieved a maximum speed of 110 km/h (68 mph).

=== Entry into service ===
The first Ahmedabad–Bhuj train service started on 16 September 2024. It consists of 12 cars, covering a distance of 359 km (223 mi). The travel time is approximately 5 hours and 40 minutes, with a maximum speed of 110 km/h (68 mph) and an average speed of 63 km/h (39 mph).

== Rolling stock ==
The Namo Bharat Rapid Rail is a self-propelled trainset similar to the Vande Bharat Express. The self-propelled feature eliminates the need for a separate locomotive and offers faster acceleration and deceleration. Designed to replace MEMU trains, its primary aim is to reduce the inter-city travel time. With a maximum operational speed of 130 km/h (81 mph), it surpasses the current running MEMUs.

Each coach features lightweight, cushioned seats accommodating 100 seated passengers and space for 200 standing. It is fully air-conditioned and equipped with modern amenities, including sealed gangways for easy movement. It also has aluminium luggage racks, LCD displays for passenger information, automatic doors, mobile charging sockets, diffused lighting, route displays, and panoramic windows with roller blinds.

Safety features include the KAVACH anti-collision system, CCTV cameras, Emergency talk-back units, fire detection systems, and modular bio-vacuum toilets. Initially, the trainsets will consist of 12 to 16 coaches depending on route demand.

=== Rake formation ===
Abbreviations:

DTC – Driving Trailer Coach; NDTC – Non-Driving Trailer Coach; MC – Motor Coach; MC2 – Motor Coach with electrical change-over switch; MC3 – 180° rotated MC2; TC – Trailer Coach having Pantograph

Rake Formation of 12 coach Namo Bharat Rapid Rail trainsetTotal Seating Capacity= 1150 Total Standing Capacity= 2058 Total Capacity= 3208
Coach No.	1	2	3	4	5	6	7	8	9	10	11	12
Power Configuration	DTC	MC	TC	MC2	NDTC	MC	TC	MC2	MC3	TC	MC	DTC
Basic Power Units	Unit 1				Unit 2				Unit 3			
Seating Capacity	57	104	104	104	104	104	104	104	104	104	104	57
Standing Capacity	104	185	185	185	185	185	185	185	185	185	185	104

== Services ==
=== Operational services ===
S.No.	Service	Zone	Cars	Distance	Travel time	Speed		Inaugural run	Ref
S.No.	Service	Zone	Cars	Distance	Travel time	Maximum (Note: Maximum permissible speed over different sections as approved by the Commissioner of Railway Safety)	Average	Inaugural run	Ref
1	Ahmedabad–Bhuj	WR	12	359 km (223 mi)	5h 40m	110 km/h (68 mph)	63 km/h (39 mph)	16 September 2024	
2	Jaynagar–Patna	ECR	16	266 km (165 mi)	5h 30m	130 km/h (81 mph)	48 km/h (30 mph)	24 April 2025	

=== Proposed services ===
S.No	Service		Zone	Distance	Ref
1	Mumbai Suburban Railway	Central Line	CR	180 km (110 mi)	
1	Mumbai Suburban Railway	Harbour Line	CR	66 km (41 mi)	
1	Mumbai Suburban Railway	Trans–Harbour Line	CR	38 km (24 mi)	
1	Mumbai Suburban Railway	Port Line	CR	26.7 km (16.6 mi)	
1	Mumbai Suburban Railway	Vasai Road–Roha Line	CR	100 km (62 mi)	
1	Mumbai Suburban Railway	Western Line	WR	123.78 km (76.91 mi)	
2	Lucknow–Unnao–Kanpur		NR	72 km (45 mi)	
3	Chennai–Tirupati		SR	147 km (91 mi)	
4	Coimbatore - Salem		SR	160 km (100 mi)	
5	Agra–Mathura		NR	54 km (34 mi)	
6	Bhubaneswar–Balasore		ECoR	206 km (128 mi)	
7	Thiruvananthapuram–Ernakulam		SR	205 km (127 mi)	
8	Thrissur–Kozhikode		SR	120 km (75 mi)	
9	Delhi–Narnaul		NR	82 km (51 mi)	
10	Durg–Nagpur		SECR	265 km	

== See also ==
- RapidX
- MEMU
- Vande Bharat Express
- Amrit Bharat Express
