= Gandhidham–Samakhiali section =

Railway line in India

Overview
- Status: Operational
- Owner: Indian Railways
- Locale: Gujarat
- Termini: Gandhidham; Samakhiali

Service
- System: Freight
- Operator: Western Railway

History
- Opened: 1950

Technical
- Track length: 53 km (33 mi)
- Number of tracks: 2
- Track gauge: 5 ft 6 in (1,676 mm) broad gauge

The Gandhidham–Samakhiali section is a rail line belonging to the Western Railway of Kutch district in Gujarat state, India. It passes through Bhimasar, Chirai and Bhachau.

== History ==
The railway was financed by the Maharao Khengarji Bawa of Cutch, and the initial section to Anjar was opened in 1905. An extension from Anjar to the state capital of Bhuj was later made and lines opened in 1908.

Varshamedi to Bhachau was opened in 1910. 15 miles from Anjar to Kandla was opened in 1930. After the formation of Gandhidham, Kandla station was renamed in 1947. Another line was laid from Kandla to Disa in 1950. Cutch State Railway was merged into the Western Railway on 5 November 1951.

== Route ==
Gandhidham–Samakhiali section connects Samakhiali–Palanpur section and Samakhiali–Maliya Miyana section.

== Freight ==
More freight traffic passes through this section. First Python goods train of Western Railway plied on this section on 12 April 2011. Later in October 2011, a goods train with 120 wagons plied on this section.
