= Viramgam–Maliya Miyana section =

Railway line in India

Overview
- Status: Operational
- Owner: Indian Railways
- Locale: Gujarat
- Termini: Viramgam; Maliya Miyana

Service
- Operator(s): Western Railway

History
- Opened: 1942

Technical
- Track length: 142 km (88 mi)
- Number of tracks: 1
- Track gauge: 5 ft 6 in (1,676 mm) broad gauge
- Electrification: Yes
- Operating speed: 100 km/h

The Viramgam–Maliya Miyana section belongs to Western Railway's Ahmedabad Division.

== History ==
Viramgam–Maliya Miyana section was opened in the early 1940s. A small line from Jhund to Kharagoda was laid by 1909.

== Freight service ==
About five express trains pass through this line daily. This line is a dedicated freight corridor to Kandla Port and Mundra Port from the remaining parts of India. Later in October 2011, a goods train with 120 wagons plied on this section.
