= Barauni–Mokama section =

Railway line in India

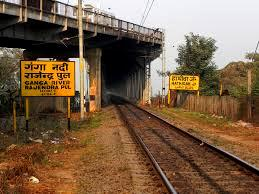
- Rajendra Setu on Barauni–Mokama section

Overview
- Status: Operational
- Owner: Indian Railways
- Locale: Bihar
- Termini: Barauni Junction; Mokama Junction
- Stations: 9

Service
- Type: Electrified
- System: Broad gauge
- Services: Barauni- Patna Rail Route
- Operator: East Central Railway

Technical
- Line length: 20 km (12 mi)
- Track length: 20 Km
- Track gauge: 5 ft 6 in (1,676 mm) broad gauge
- Operating speed: 100 Kmph

The Barauni–Mokama section connects Mokama Junction and Barauni Junction in the Indian state of Bihar.

The Howrah–Delhi main line on the southern side of the Ganges was opened to through traffic in 1866 and the railway lines on the northern side of the Ganges also came up in the subsequent years of the nineteenth century. The lines could only be connected with the construction of 2-kilometre (1.2 mi) long Rajendra Setu in 1959.

A new two line railway bridge officially came into service on 5th October 2026 adjacent to the existing single line Old bridge, making the total railway line to 3, enhancing the overall capacity of railways on river Ganga.

The 3.19-kilometre (1.98 mi)-long Munger Ganga Bridge, 55 km downstream of the Rajendra Setu, links Jamalpur station on the Sahibganj loop line of Eastern Railway to the Barauni–Katihar section of East Central Railway.

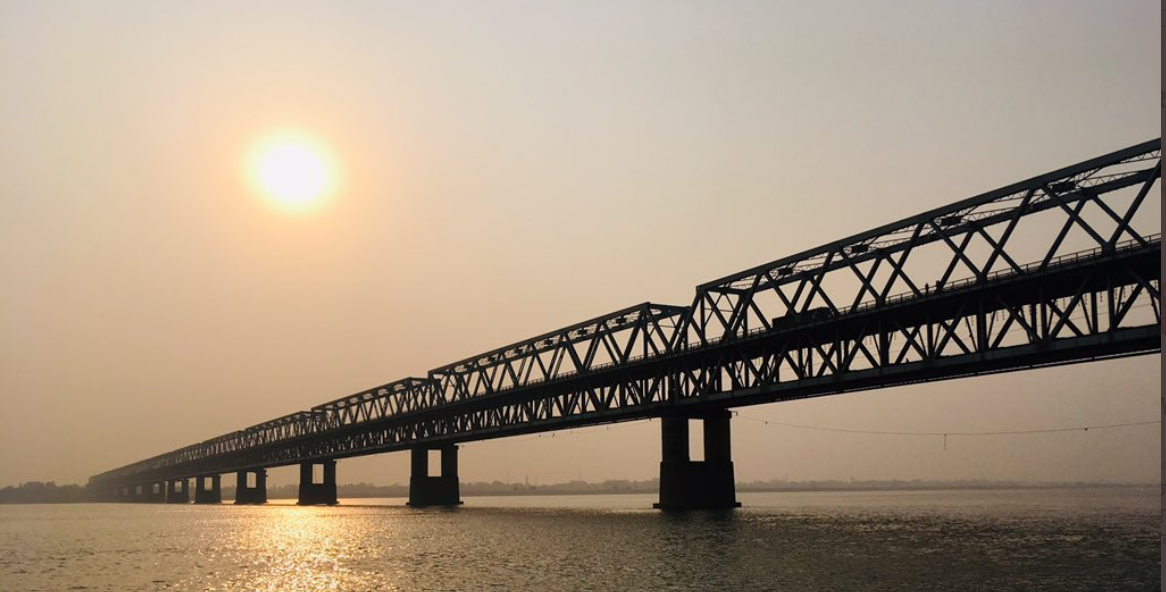
Rajendra Setu

The 4.56-kilometre (2.83 mi) long Digha–Sonpur Bridge located near Patna, link to Sonpur.

== Trains ==
These trains have a stop in this section while there are many other trains.

- Jaynagar–Anand Vihar Garib Rath Express
- Jaynagar-Udhna Antyodaya Express
- Bagmati Express
- Jaynagar-Patna Namo Bharat Rapid Rail
- Kamla Ganga Express
