= Morbi railway station =

Railway station in Gujarat, India

General information
- Location: Morbi, Morbi district, Gujarat; India
- Coordinates: 22°49′28″N 70°49′53″E
- Elevation: 49 m (161 ft)
- System: Indian Railways station
- Owner: Indian Railways
- Operator: Western Railway
- Line: Maliya Miyana–Wankaner section
- Platforms: 1
- Tracks: 4

Construction
- Structure type: Standard (on-ground station)
- Parking: Yes

Other information
- Status: Functioning
- Station code: MVI
- Zone(s): Western Railway
- Division(s): Rajkot

History
- Opened: 1890
- Former names: Morvi State Railway
Location
- Location within India Location within Gujarat

The Morbi railway station belongs to the Western Railway of Rajkot Division. It is located in the Morbi district of Gujarat State.

== History ==
The Maliya Miyana–Wankaner section was initially laid as a 2 ft 6 in (762 mm) gauge roadside tram way in the year 1890 by Waghji Thakor of Morvi State Railway. This was done for the convenience of the people and for transportation of salt and cloth. Sir Lakhdhiraji Thakor, ruled from 1922 to 1948 after the death of Waghji Thakor. Sir Lakhdiraji acted as a ruler, manager, patron and policeman of the state with great authority. Sir Lakhdiraji, like other contemporary rulers of Saurashtra, built roads and a railway network (of seventy miles), connecting Wadhwan and Morbi and the two small ports of Navlakhi and Vavania, for exporting the state's production of salt and cloth. The Morbi railway station combines Indian and European architectural elements. In 1924 all the lines were converted to metre gauge to match the rail lines of other Princely States. Before railbuses took over on Wankaner–Morvi, there were two-coach trains hauled by YG or YP steam locos (these were the last steam-hauled trains on those routes). The conversion to broad gauge was completed in the year 2001.

== Passenger amenities ==
More goods trains pass through this station than passenger trains. Only two express trains (weekly once each) arrive at this station. Six passenger trains terminate and start at this station. It has trains to Mumbai, Kamakhya, Rajkot, Gandhidham and Wankaner Junction.
