= Mokama Junction railway station =

Railway station in Patna, Bihar, India

MOKAMA JUNCTION

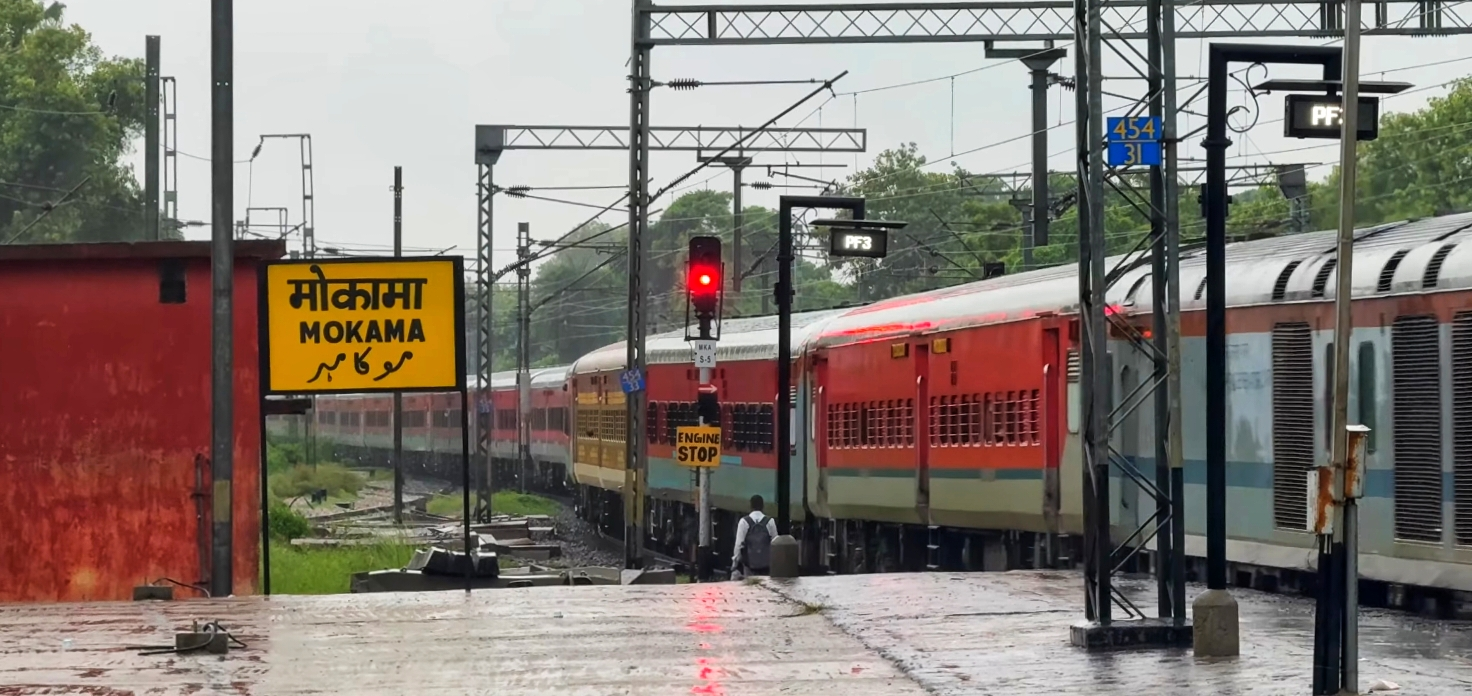
- View of the station board from three of the platforms

General information
- Location: Mokama, Patna, Bihar; India
- Coordinates: 25°23′31″N 85°54′52″E
- Elevation: 48 metres (157 ft)
- System: Indian Railways
- Owner: Indian Railways
- Lines: Howrah–Delhi main line Asansol–Patna section Barauni–Mokama section Barauni–Mokama–Patna line Harnaut–Mokama section
- Platforms: 3
- Tracks: 5
- Connections: Kiul Junction; Patna Junction; Barauni Junction

Construction
- Structure type: Standard (on-ground station)
- Parking: Available

Other information
- Status: Functioning
- Station code: MKA
- Zone(s): East Central Railway
- Division(s): Danapur Division

History
- Former names: Mokameh Junction

Passengers
- 2013: 50,000
Route map
- Source: Indian Railways Time Table, Eastern Zone
Location
- Location within Bihar Location within India
- Interactive map of Mokama Junction

Mokama Junction railway station also known as Mokameh station, station code MKA, is a railway station in Danapur division of East Central Railway. Mokama is connected to metropolitan areas of India, by the Delhi–Kolkata main line via Mugalsarai–Patna route. Mokama is located in Mokama city in Patna district in the Indian state of Bihar. Due to its location on the Howrah–Patna–Mughalsarai main line many Patna, Barauni-bound express trains coming from Howrah, Sealdah, Ranchi, Tatanagar stop here. Mokama station is an important of the Danapur division as it links, Assam through the Mokama–Barauni section and North Bihar by the Rajendra Bridge on the Ganga river.

== Facilities ==
The major facilities available are waiting rooms, computerized reservation facility, Vehicle parking. The vehicles are allowed to enter the station premises. The station also has STD/ISD/PCO Telephone booth, toilets, tea stall and book stall. The Mokama–Kiul section has optical fibre for improved communication and railway safety.

=== Platforms ===
It has four platforms that are interconnected with two foot overbridges.

Its platform number 1 has now IRCTC restaurant.

== Trains ==
Many passenger and express trains serve Mokama station.
