= Ahmedabad–Viramgam section =

Section of railway line in India

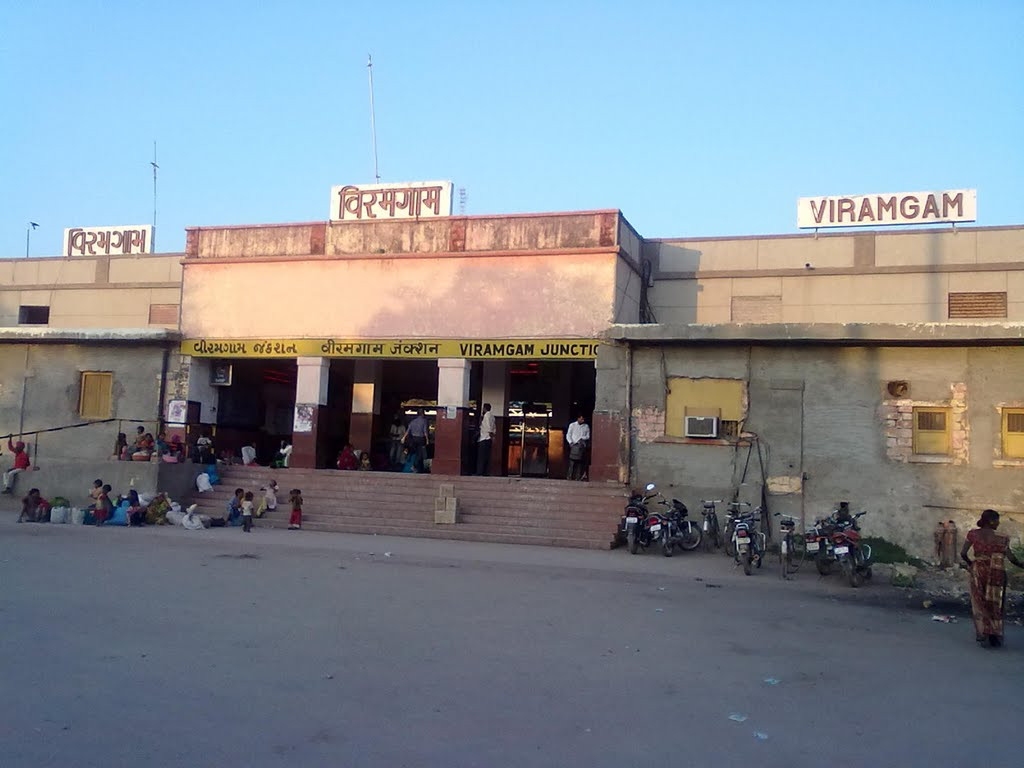
- Viramgam Junction is an Important railway station in Ahmedabad–Viramgam section

Overview
- Status: Operational
- Owner: Indian Railways
- Locale: Gujarat
- Termini: Ahmedabad; Viramgam

Service
- Operator: Western Railway

History
- Opened: 1871

Technical
- Track length: 65 km (40 mi)
- Number of tracks: 2
- Track gauge: 5 ft 6 in (1,676 mm) broad gauge

The Ahmedabad–Viramgam section belongs to Western Railway of Ahmedabad Division.

== History ==
During 19th century Ahmedabad–Viramgam section was owned by BB&CI. During which Ahmedabad–Viramgam section was laid in 1871 by BB&CI. Later BB&CI line was extended to Surendranagar in 1872. After then Broad gauge network to Surendranagar was extended by BB&CI Railway in 1879. Bombay, Baroda and Central India Railway was merged into the Western Railway on 5 November 1951. Later gauge conversion of Ahmedabad–Viramgam section has completed in earlier 1980's.

== Freight ==
Later in October 2011, a goods train with 120 wagons plied on this section.

== Speed limits ==
The Ahmedabad–Viramgam section is classified as a Group D-special class line in which speeds up to 100 km/h is allowed.
