= Jaynagar–Patna Namo Bharat Rapid Rail =

Namo Bharat Rapid Rail route in India

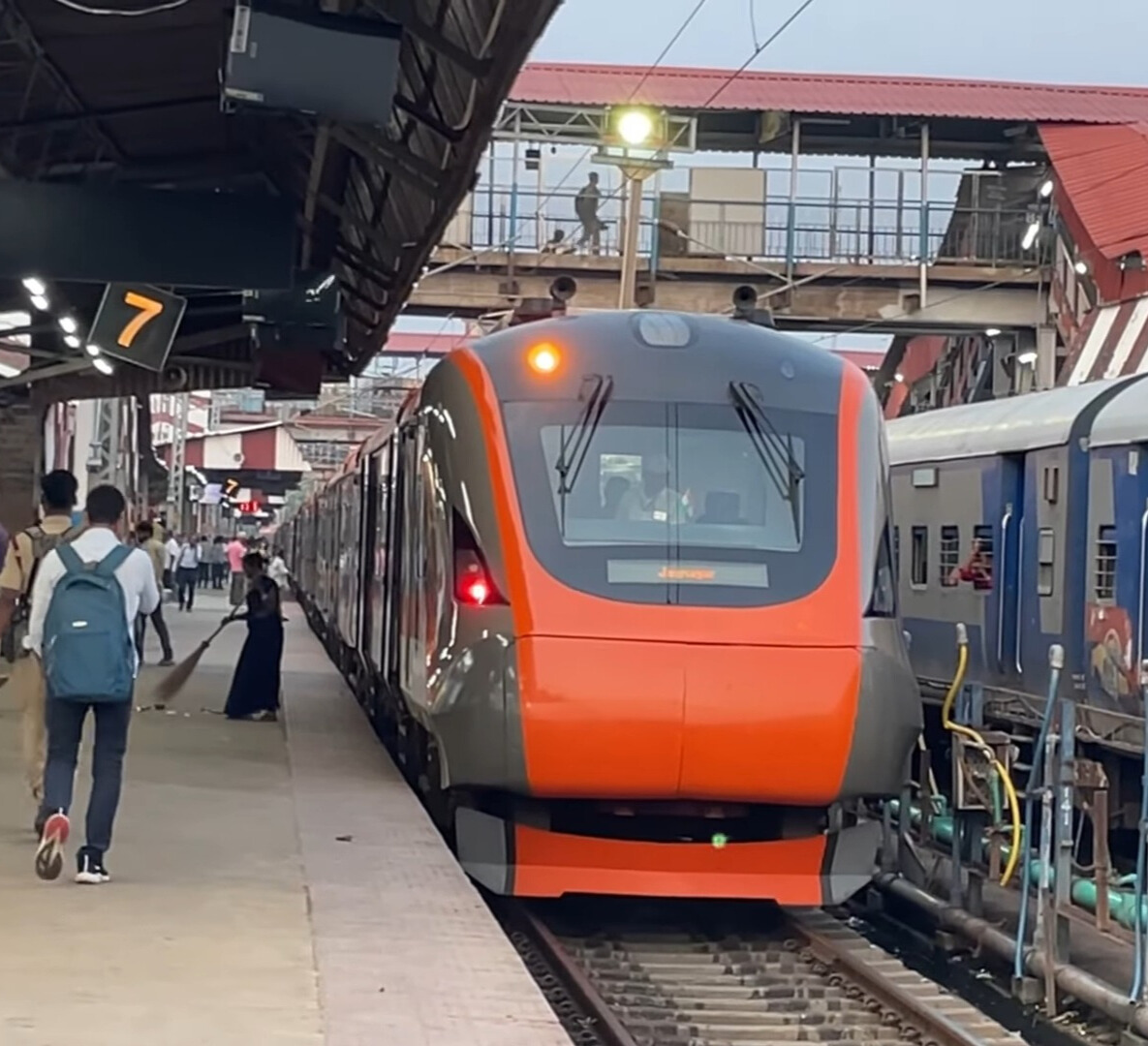
- Train of Namo Bharat Rapid Rail

Overview
- Service type: Inter-city rail, Namo Bharat Rapid Rail
- Status: Active
- Locale: Bihar
- First service: 24 April 2025; 17 months ago (Inaugural) 25 April 2025; 17 months ago (Commercial)
- Current operator: East Central Railway (ECR)

Route
- Termini: Jaynagar (JYG); Patna Junction (PNBE)
- Stops: 9
- Distance travelled: 266 km (165 mi)
- Average journey time: 5h 30m
- Service frequency: Weekly
- Train number: 94803 / 94804
- Lines used: Darbhanga–Jaynagar line; Barauni–Samastipur section; Barauni–Mokama section; Barh–Patna section

On-board services
- Class: AC Unreserved Chair Car (CC)
- Seating arrangements: Yes
- Sleeping arrangements: No
- Catering facilities: No
- Observation facilities: Wide windows
- Entertainment facilities: Onboard Wi-Fi; Electric outlets
- Baggage facilities: Overhead racks
- Other facilities: Automatic doors; smoke alarms; bio-vacuum toilets

Technical
- Track gauge: Indian gauge
- Electrification: 25 kV 50 Hz AC overhead line
- Operating speed: 130 km/h (81 mph) maximum, 48 km (30 mi)
- Track owner: Indian Railways
- Rake sharing: No

The 94803/94804 Jaynagar–Patna Namo Bharat Rapid Rail is India's 2nd semi-high speed Intercity train which connects the Jaynagar and terminates in Patna Junction of Bihar in India. It categorized under the Vande Metro/Namo Bharat Rapid Rail Network.

The train was inaugurated on 24 April 2025 by Honorable Prime Minister Narendra Modi via video conference from Patna, Bihar in India.

== Overview ==
The train is operated by Indian Railways, connecting Jaynagar and Patna Junction. It is currently operated with 94803/94804 with weekly services.

== Rakes ==
The Jaynagar–Patna Namo Bharat Rapid Rail operates with a 16-coach formation designed for high-speed and passenger comfort. It consists of AC Chair Cars and Executive Class coaches, along with a power car and luggage/parcel compartments. The rake features modern amenities including large windows for observation, digital screens for entertainment, and overhead baggage racks. Advanced safety systems such as fire detection, emergency brakes, and reinforced coach structures are included. The coaches are optimized for efficiency, smooth rides, and a premium travel experience, reflecting the modern design of India's Namo Bharat Rapid Rail series.

== Schedule ==
Train schedule: Jaynagar ↔ Patna Namo Bharat Rapid Rail
Train no.	Station code	Departure station	Departure time	Departure day	Arrival station	Arrival Time	Arrival hours
94803	JYG	Jaynagar	5:00 AM	Monday, Tuesday, Wednesday, Thursday, Friday & Saturday	Patna Junction	10:30 AM	5h 30m
94804	PNBE	Patna Junction	6:05 PM	Sunday, Monday, Tuesday, Wednesday, Thursday & Friday	Jaynagar	11:45 PM	5h 40m

== Routes and halts ==
Route and halts of Jaynagar–Patna Namo Bharat Rapid Rail (Both Directions) 94803/ 94804
Station name (Jaynagar → Patna)	Station name (Patna → Jaynagar)
Jaynagar	Patna Junction
Madhubani	Barh
Sakri Junction	Mokama
Darbhanga Junction	Barauni Junction
Samastipur Junction	Samastipur Junction
Barauni Junction	Darbhanga Junction
Mokama	Sakri Junction
Barh	Madhubani
Patna Junction	Jaynagar

== Rake reversal ==
There is no rake reversal or rake share.

== See also ==
- Amrit Bharat Express
- Namo Bharat Rapid Rail
- Vande Bharat Express
- Jaynagar
- Patna Junction

== Notes ==
a. Runs 6 days in a week with both directions.
