= Maliya Miyana–Wankaner section =

Railway line in India

Overview
- Status: Operational
- Owner: Indian Railways
- Locale: Gujarat
- Termini: Maliya Miyana; Wankaner Junction
- Stations: Morbi (or Morvi)

Service
- Operator: Western Railway

History
- Opened: 1890 up to Morvi; 1940 up to Maliya Miyana

Technical
- Track length: 80 km (50 mi)
- Number of tracks: 1
- Track gauge: 5 ft 6 in (1,676 mm) broad gauge
- Old gauge: 2 ft 6 in (762 mm) (1890–1924); 1,000 mm (3 ft 3 3/8 in) (1924–1997) narrow gauge
- Electrification: Yes

The Maliya Miyana–Wankaner section to Western Railway of Rajkot Division in Gujarat State.

== History ==
The Morvi–Wankaner section was laid as a 2 ft 6 in (762 mm) (narrow gauge) roadside tram way in the year 1890 by Morvi Railway up to Morvi under the regime of Sir Waghji Thakor. Later it was converted to 1,000 mm (3 ft 3 3/8 in) metre gauge in 1924. Later it was extended to Maliya Miyana before the 1940s. Sir Lakhdhiraji Thakor who ruled from 1922 until 1948. Sir Lakhdiraji acted as a ruler, manager, patron and policeman of the state with great authority. Sir Lakhdiraji, like other contemporary rulers of Saurashtra, built roads and a railway network (of seventy miles), connecting Wadhwan and Morbi and the two small ports of Navlakhi and Vavania to export salt and cloth. It was the last steam engine hauled section in India. Before railbuses took over on Wankaner–Morvi, there were two-coach trains hauled by YG or YP steam locos (these were the last steam-hauled trains on those routes). Running of Steam trains stopped in April 1999.

== Gauge conversion ==
Gauge conversion of Maliya–Miyana section was taken up in 1996–97. Conversion to broad gauge was completed in the year 2001.

== Freight ==
Maliya Miyana–Wankaner section is mainly a freight line for salt transportation from Dahinsar. Due to income in freight this line is not closed otherwise it would have been closed. Less passenger trains pass through this line.
