= Maliya Miyana Junction railway station =

Railway station in Gujarat, India

Maliya Miyana Junction

General information
- Location: Maliya, Morbi district, Gujarat; India
- Coordinates: 23°06′13″N 70°45′19″E
- Elevation: 6 m (20 ft)
- System: Indian Railways station
- Owner: Indian Railways
- Operator: Western Railway
- Lines: Gandhidham–Ahmedabad main line Maliya Miyana–Wankaner section
- Platforms: 2
- Tracks: 4

Construction
- Structure type: Standard (on-ground station)
- Parking: Yes

Other information
- Status: Functioning
- Station code: MALB
- Zone(s): Western Railway
- Division(s): Ahmedabad

History
- Opened: 1940
- Former names: Morvi State Railway
Location
- Location within India Location within Gujarat

Maliya Miyana Junction railway station is a railway station in Maliya of Morbi district in Gujarat. It belongs to the Western Railway of Ahmedabad Division.

Maliya Miyana Junction is well connected by rail to Bandra Terminus, Dadar, Visakhapatnam Junction, Nagercoil, Bareilly Junction, Gandhidham Junction, Bhuj and Kamakhya.

== History ==
Maliya Miyana–Wankaner section is a road-side tram way laid down in 1880 by Morvi State Railway. It was built with a gauge of 2 feet 6 inches (0.76 m), but was converted to metre gauge between 1905 and the 1930s. The last steam-engine hauled section in India, it was subsequently converted to broad gauge, the work being completed in 2001.

== Major trains ==
Following trains halt at Maliya Miyana Junction railway station in both direction:

- 22955/56 Kutch Express
- 18501/02 Visakhapatnam–Gandhidham Express
- 19115/16 Sayajinagari Express
- 14311/12 Ala Hazrat Express (via Ahmedabad)
- 16335/36 Gandhidham–Nagercoil Express
- 15667/68 Kamakhya–Gandhidham Express

Maliya Miyana–Morbi DEMU train starts from here.
