= Chandlodiya =

Chandlodiya (Chandlodia)
- town
- Location in Gujarat, India Chandlodiya (Chandlodia) (India)
- Coordinates: 23.096189°N 72.53817°E
- Country: India
- State: Gujarat
- District: Ahmedabad

Government
  - Type: Municipal Corporation

Population (2001)
  - Total: 56,135

Languages
  - Official: Gujarati, Hindi
- Time zone: UTC+5:30 (IST)
- Postal code: 382481
- Vehicle registration: GJ01
- Website: gujaratindia.com

Chandlodia is an area under Ahmedabad Municipal Corporation in Ahmedabad district in the state of Gujarat, India.

== Demographics ==
As of 2001 India census, Chandlodiya had a population of 56,135. Males constitute 54% of the population and females 46%. Chandlodiya has an average literacy rate of 74%, higher than the national average of 59.5%; with male literacy of 79% and female literacy of 68%. 12% of the population is under 6 years of age.
