= Viramgam Junction railway station =

Railway station in Gujarat, India

Viramgam Junction
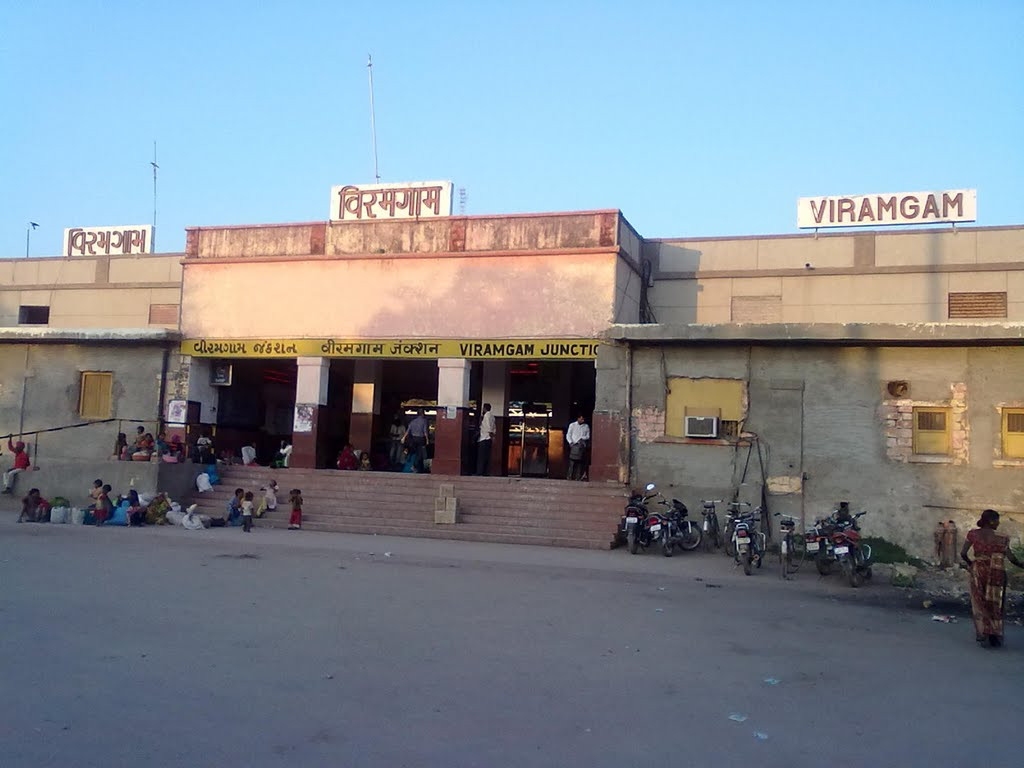

General information
- Location: Viramgam, Ahmedabad district, Gujarat; India
- Coordinates: 23°07′43″N 72°03′10″E
- Elevation: 29 metres (95 ft)
- System: Indian Railways station
- Owner: Indian Railways
- Operator: Western Railway
- Lines: Viramgam–Mahesana section Gandhidham–Ahmedabad main line Viramgam–Okha line
- Platforms: 5
- Tracks: 7

Construction
- Structure type: Standard
- Parking: Yes

Other information
- Status: Functioning
- Station code: VG
- Zone(s): Western Railway
- Division(s): Ahmedabad

History
- Opened: 1871; 155 years ago
- Former names: Bombay, Baroda and Central India Railway
Location
- Location within India Location within Gujarat

Viramgam Junction railway station is located in Ahmedabad district of Gujarat state of India. It serves Viramgam town. Its code is VG. It comes under Ahmedabad division of Western Railway Zone. Passenger, Express and Superfast trains halt here.

== History ==
During 19th century Viramgam railway station owned by BB&CI. During which Ahmedabad–Viramgam section was laid in 1871 by BB&CI. Later BB&CI line was extended to Wadhwan.

== Railway reorganization ==
Bombay, Baroda and Central India Railway was merged into the Western Railway on 5 November 1951. Later gauge conversion of Ahmedabad–Viramgam section in 1969 and Viramgam–Hapa section has completed in 1980.

== Major trains ==
- Ahmedabad–Okha Vande Bharat Express
- Ala Hazrat Express (via Ahmedabad)
- Saurashtra Express

== Features ==
It is on Gandhidham–Ahmedabad main line. It is a junction railway station connecting Rajkot, Visakhapatnam, Ahmedabad, Bandra Terminus, Dadar Western, Mumbai Central, Okha, Mahesana and Bhavnagar Terminus. About 40 trains pass through this station daily.
