= Port of Navlakhi =

- Interactive map of Port of Navlakhi
- Location within Gujarat Location within India

Location
- Coordinates: 22°58′N 70°27′E

Navlakhi Port is an all-weather lighterage non-major intermediate port on the southwest end of the Gulf of Kutch in Hansthal Creek, India. The port is about 45 km from Morbi and 160 km from Kandla. Navigation is permitted only during daylight hours; boats use channel buoys for navigation. The port unloads 8,000 to 9,000 MT of coal per day. It is governed by the Gujarat Maritime Board. The nearest airports are in Rajkot (120 km) and Jamnagar (135 km).
