= Western Railway zone =

One of the 18 zones of Indian Railways

Western Railway

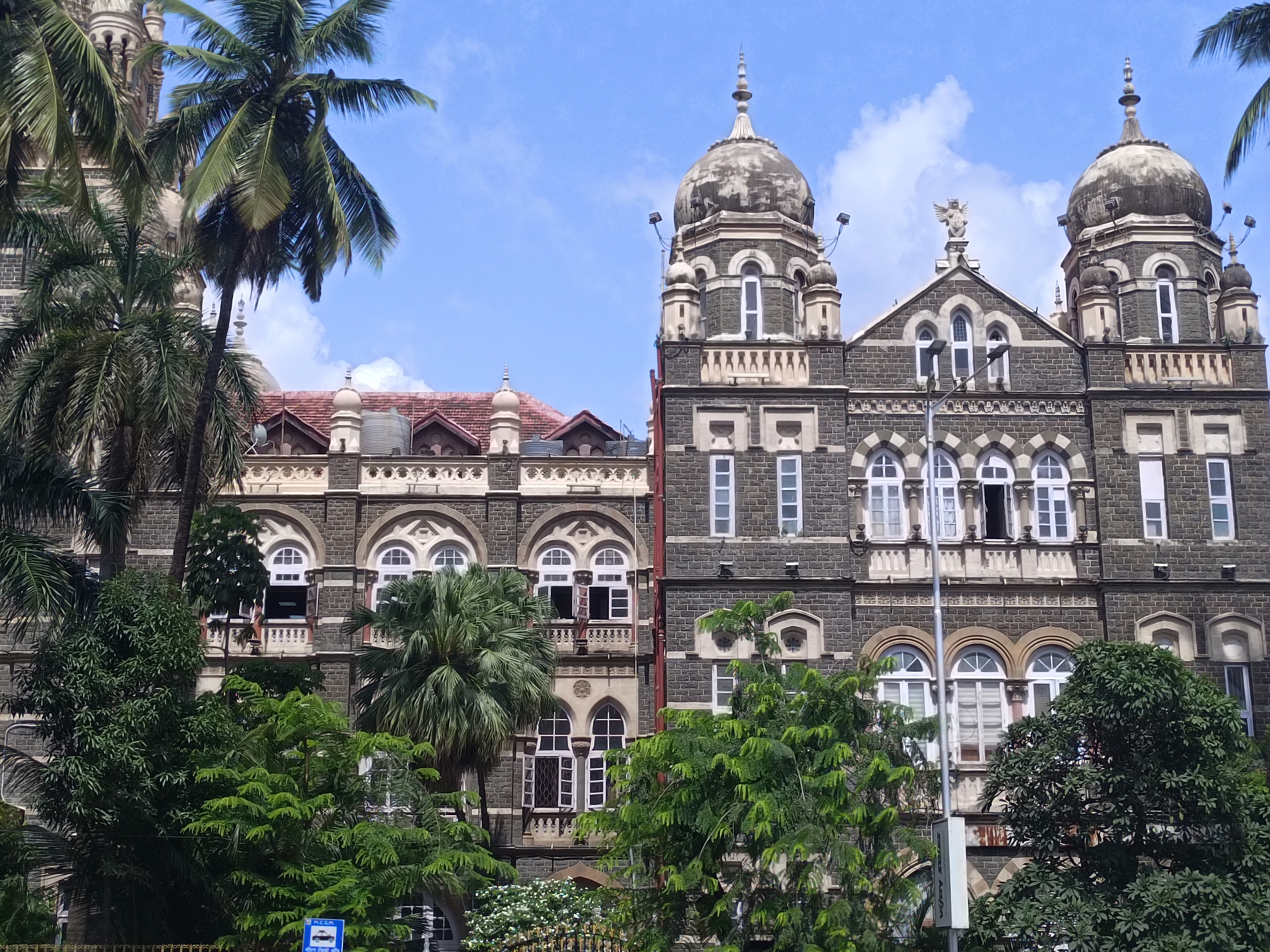

Overview
- Headquarters: Churchgate, Mumbai, Maharashtra, India
- Reporting mark: WR
- Locale: Maharashtra, Gujarat, Rajasthan, Madhya Pradesh
- Dates of operation: 5 November 1951; 74 years ago – present
- Predecessor: Bombay, Baroda and Central India Railway (BB&CI); Saurashtra Railway; Rajputana Railway; Jaipur State Railway; Cutch State Railway

Technical
- Track gauge: broad gauge, metre gauge & narrow gauge

Other
- Website: WR official website

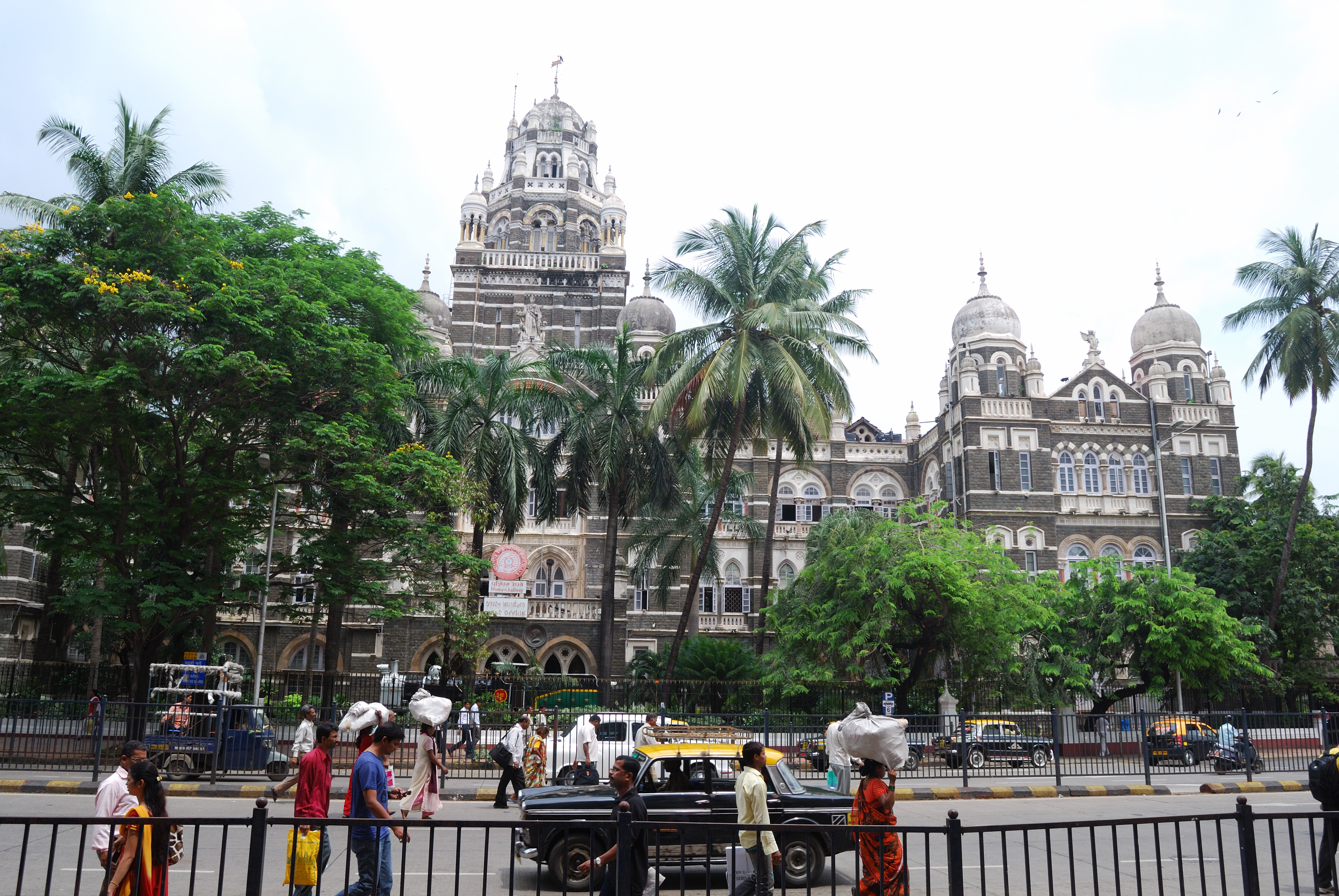
Western Railway HQ, Mumbai

The Western Railway (abbreviated WR) is one of the 19 zones of Indian Railways and is among the busiest railway networks in India, headquartered at Mumbai, Maharashtra. The major railway routes of Indian Railways which come under Western Railways are: Mumbai Central–Ratlam, Mumbai Central–Ahmedabad and Palanpur–Ahmedabad. The railway system is divided into six operating divisions: Ahmedabad, Vadodara, Rajkot, Bhavnagar, Ratlam, and Mumbai WR. Vadodara railway station, being the junction point for the Ahmedabad–Mumbai route and the Mumbai–Ratlam route towards New Delhi, is the busiest junction station in Western Railways and one of the busiest junctions of Indian Railways too, while Ahmedabad Division earns highest revenue followed by Mumbai Division and Vadodara Division. Surat railway station is one of the busiest railway station in Western Railway in non-junction category where more than 180 trains pass per day.

Western Railway General Manager's official bungalow 'Bombarci' (abbreviation of Bombay, Baroda and Central India) is located on Altamont road in Cumbala hill, Mumbai.

== History ==
The Western Railway was created on 5 November 1951 by merging several state-owned railways, including the Bombay, Baroda and Central India Railway (BB&CI), and the Saurashtra Railway, Rajputana Railway and Jaipur State Railway. The narrow-gauge lines of Cutch State Railway was also merged into it in 1951.

The BB&CI Railway was itself inaugurated in 1855, starting with the construction of a 29-mile (47-km) broad-gauge track from Ankleshwar to Utran in Gujarat state on the west coast. In 1864, the railway was extended to Mumbai and the first train was flagged off from Grant Road Station in Mumbai to Ahmedabad on 28 November 1864. Subsequently, the project was further extended beyond Vadodara in a north easterly direction towards Godhra, Ratlam, Nagda and thereafter northwards towards Kota and Mathura, to eventually link with the Great Indian Peninsular Railway, now the Central Railway, which had already started operating in Mumbai in 1853. In 1860 Surat railway station was built. In 1883, a metre-gauge railway system, initially linking Delhi with Agra, Jaipur and Ajmer, was established.

The first suburban service in Mumbai with steam traction was introduced in April 1867. It was extended to Churchgate in 1870. By 1900 45 trains in each direction were carrying over one million passengers annually.

The railways of several princely states were also integrated into the Western Railway. The Gaekwars of Baroda built the Gaekwar's Baroda State Railway (GBSR), which was merged into the BB&CI in 1949. Several railways of western Gujarat, including the Bhavnagar, Kathiawar, Jamnagar & Dwarka, Gondal, and Morvi railways were merged into the Saurashtra Railway in 1948. The Jodhpur–Bikaner Railway was taken over by Rajasthan state in 1949, after the western portion was ceded to the government of Pakistan.

In 2002, the Jaipur and Ajmer divisions of the Western Railway became part of the newly created North Western Railway, and in April 2003 the Kota division of the Western Railway became part of the newly created West Central Railway.

== Present ==
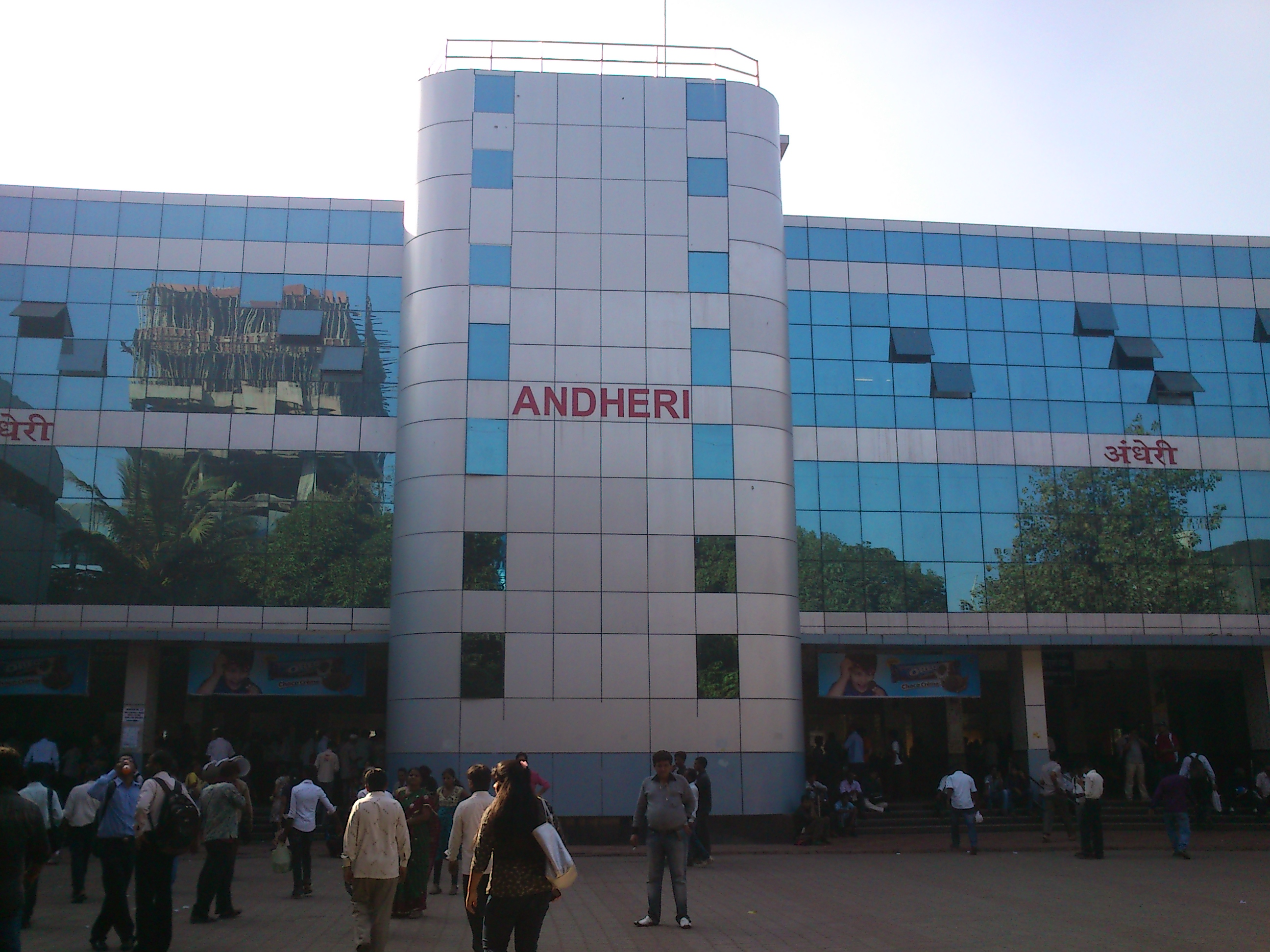
Newly built Andheri Station East Side

Western Railway headquarters is in Mumbai's Churchgate station and serves the entire state of Gujarat, some portions of Western Madhya Pradesh, and coastal Maharashtra and some parts of Rajasthan. The Western coast of India served by Western Railway has a number of ports, most important among them being Kandla, Hajira, Surat, Dahej, Mundra, Okha, Veraval, Porbandar, Bhavnagar in Gujarat state and Mumbai in Maharashtra.

Navapur railway station is unique as it falls in both the states of Gujarat and Maharashtra because both were part of Bombay State before 1960 and after States Reorganization Act the Navapur station was divided equally among Gujarat and Maharashtra. The Surat railway station is also unique. It was the first rail station in Asia with an above ground floor platform.

The Western Railway operates electric multiple units (EMUs) on the Western line of the Mumbai Suburban Railway, which forms part of the Ahmedabad–Mumbai main line. The EMUs ply between Churchgate and Virar (60 km) and was extended until Dahanu Road and Services actually started on 16 April 2013. EMUs are of 12-car or 15-car rakes and are differentiated as slow and fast locals. Slow trains halt at all stations, while fast ones halt at important stations only and are preferable over longer distances. The first electric train on this section was introduced in 1928 between Churchgate and Andheri. AC EMUs were introduced on Mumbai Suburban section of Western Railway on 25 December 2017.

Today, Western Railway runs 1394 suburban services, including 96 AC services, with the AC services increasing in popularity. The suburban services are the lifeline of the city, with the working class commuting daily, covering more than 60 km per day. Western Railway is upgrading its suburban system for commuter comfort.

== Western Railway's Mumbai Suburban Section ==
Western Railway's Mumbai Suburban section extends from Churchgate to Dahanu Road (123 km). Western Railway operates 1394 EMU services on this section with 96 being AC services. The suburban section is the lifeline of city, with commuters travelling more than 60 km distances to reach their workplace. To make commuting more comfortable, Western Railway has done several upgradations in recent past. Many Foot Over Bridges have been constructed, Esclators and Lifts have been installed, elevated decks have been made at Andheri, Borivali and Goregaon stations and work is in progress at Khar Road, Mira Road and other stations.

== Developments on Western Railway ==
Many developments have taken place on Western railway in recent past. The unstaffed level crossings have been eliminated. The staffed level crossings are also being closed by constructing Road Over Bridges and Road Under Bridges. Electrification is being carried out in mission mode to convert whole of Western Railway to electric traction.

Gauge Conversion, Doubling and New Line work in recent years:

- Ahmedabad-Himatnagar-Udaipur Gauge Conversion
- Ahmedabad-Botad GC
- Dhasa-Jetalsar GC
- Dabhoi-Samlaya GC
- Dr. Ambedkar Nagar-Patalpani section GC
- Junagadh-Visavdar GC
- Samni-Jambusa GC
- Ratlam-Fatehabad Chandravatiganj-Indore GC
- Rajkot-Surendranagar doubling
- Udhana-Jalgaon doubling
- Viramgam - Surendranagar doubling
- Viramgam - Samakhiali doubling
- Palanpur - Samakhiali doubling
- Patan - Bhildi New Line
- Chandod-Ektanagar New Line
- Bhimnath-Dholera New Line

== Vande Bharat trains ==
The new upgraded Vande Bharat version 2.0 was first introduced on 30/09/2022 between Gandhinagar and Mumbai Central. The train set boasts of several passenger friendly features. Today, Western Railway runs six Vande Bharat trains viz:

1. Mumbai Central–Gandhinagar Capital Vande Bharat Express
2. Surat – Udaipur City Vande Bharat Express
3. Ahmedabad–Okha Vande Bharat Express
4. Jodhpur–Sabarmati (Ahmedabad) Vande Bharat Express
5. Ahmedabad–Mumbai Central Vande Bharat Express
6. Sabarmati (Ahmedabad) – Veraval Vande Bharat Express

== Namo Bharat Rapid Rail ==
India's first Vande Metro train was renamed to the Namo Bharat Rapid Rail and launched on September 16, 2024, connecting Ahmedabad and Bhuj in Gujarat.

=== Operational services ===
S.No.	Service	Zone	Cars	Distance	Travel time	Speed		Inaugural run	Ref
S.No.	Service	Zone	Cars	Distance	Travel time	Maximum (Note: Maximum permissible speed over different sections as approved by the Commissioner of Railway Safety)	Average	Inaugural run	Ref
1	Ahmedabad–Bhuj	WR	12	359 km (223 mi)	5h 40m	110 km/h (68 mph)	63 km/h (39 mph)	16 September 2024	
2	Jaynagar–Patna	ECR	16	266 km (165 mi)	5h 30m	130 km/h (81 mph)	48 km/h (30 mph)	24 April 2025	

=== Proposed services ===
S.No	Service		Zone	Distance	Ref
1	Mumbai Suburban Railway	Central Line	CR	180 km (110 mi)	
1	Mumbai Suburban Railway	Harbour Line	CR	66 km (41 mi)	
1	Mumbai Suburban Railway	Trans–Harbour Line	CR	38 km (24 mi)	
1	Mumbai Suburban Railway	Port Line	CR	26.7 km (16.6 mi)	
1	Mumbai Suburban Railway	Vasai Road–Roha Line	CR	100 km (62 mi)	
1	Mumbai Suburban Railway	Western Line	WR	123.78 km (76.91 mi)	
2	Lucknow–Unnao–Kanpur		NR	72 km (45 mi)	
3	Chennai–Tirupati		SR	147 km (91 mi)	
4	Agra–Mathura		NR	54 km (34 mi)	
5	Bhubaneswar–Balasore		ECoR	206 km (128 mi)	
6	Thiruvananthapuram–Ernakulam		SR	205 km (127 mi)	
7	Thrissur–Kozhikode		SR	120 km (75 mi)	
8	Delhi–Narnaul		NR	82 km (51 mi)	
9	Durg–Nagpur		SECR	265 km	

== LNG Trains ==
India's first LNG liquefied natural gas-powered train was launched by Union Home Minister Amit Shah and Gujarat's CM Bhupendra Patel at Sabarmati Railway Station in Ahmedabad, Gujarat on September 27, 2026.

- Key Details of India's First LNG *Train technology:

Liquefied Natural Gas (LNG)-diesel dual-fuel system fitted on two 1,400 HP Driving Power Cars of an 11-coach DEMU (Diesel Electric Multiple Unit) train.

- Fuel Substitution:

Replaces up to 40% of traditional diesel consumption, automatically switching between fuels as needed.

- Range & Capacity:

Equipped with a 2,200-litre LNG tank carrying about 950–1,000 kg of usable gas, offering a range of up to 444 km on a single refill.

- Cost & Savings:

Estimated to save roughly ₹23.9 lakh annually for a full eight-coach rake in fuel costs.

- Environmental Impact:

Lowers emissions of carbon dioxide, nitrogen oxides, and particulate matter compared to standard diesel operation.

1. 79431/32 Ahmedabad(Sabarmati BG) - Mahesana Junction Demu

== Western Railway Connects Statue of Unity ==
On 17 January 2021, the Statue of Unity came on the railways map. Western Railway connected the Statue of Unity with the Broad Gauge electrified line with Mumbai-Delhi main line at Vadodara. The project included gauge conversion of Dabhoi-Chandod section, new line from Chandod to Kevadiya (Statue of Unity) and electrification of Pratapnagar (Vadodara) to Kevadiya. The project was completed in a record time in close coordination with state government by Western Railway. It was inaugurated by Shri Narendra Modi, Prime Minister through video conferencing from New Delhi. 8 inaugural trains were flagged off from various parts of the country on same day. Vistadome coach has been introduced in Ahmedabad-Kevadiya Janshatabdi express.

There is one special train - 09409/09410 Ahmedabad Jn (ADI) - Ekta Nagar (EKNR) Steam Heritage Special. Inaugurated on 30 October 2023. Runs every Saturday and Sunday. 182 km. 1 stop, Vadodara Jn (BRC). Although locomotive looks like steam engine, it's an electric locomotive.

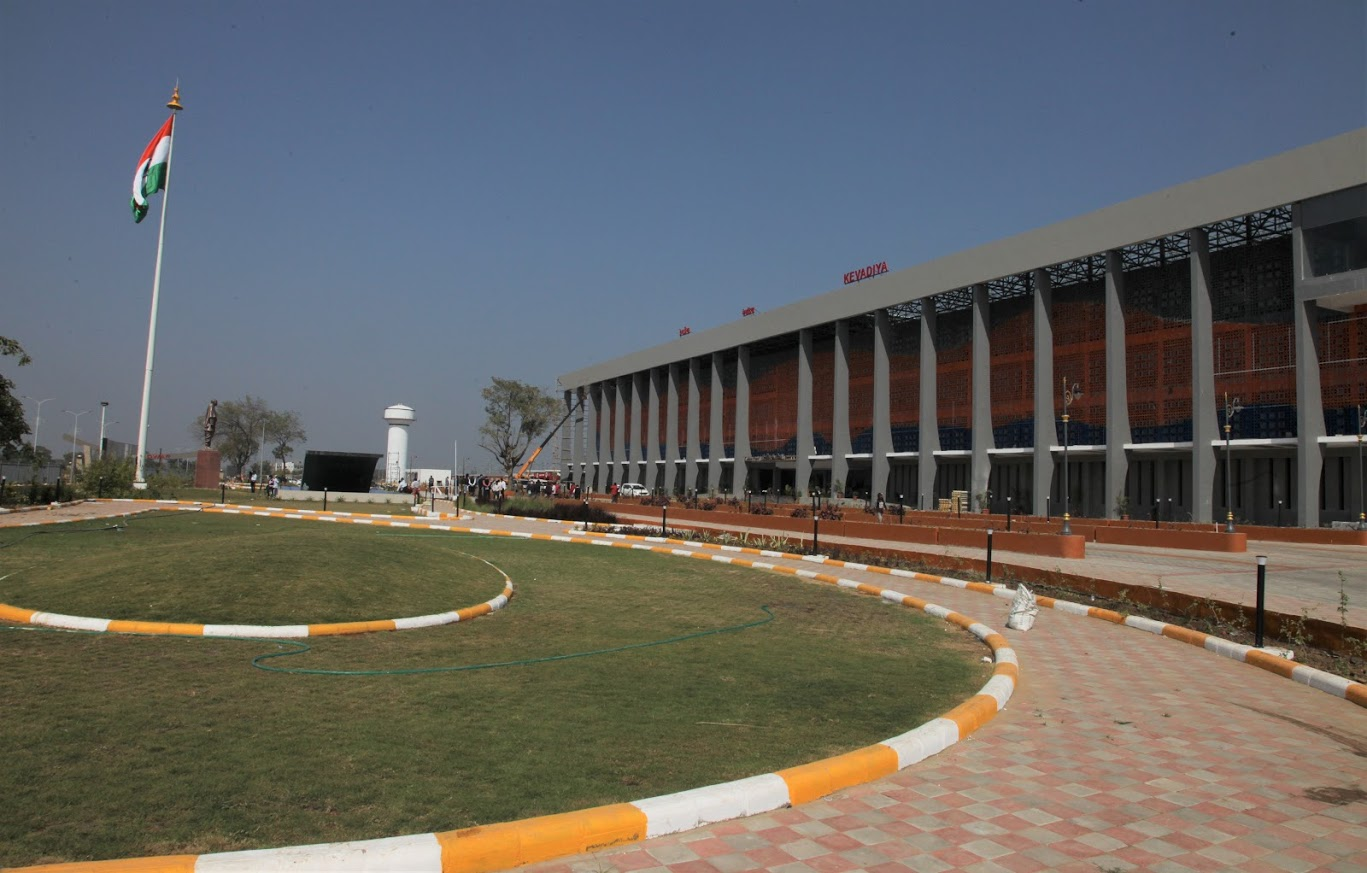
Kevadiya Station Building, Rail Connectivity to Statue of Unity

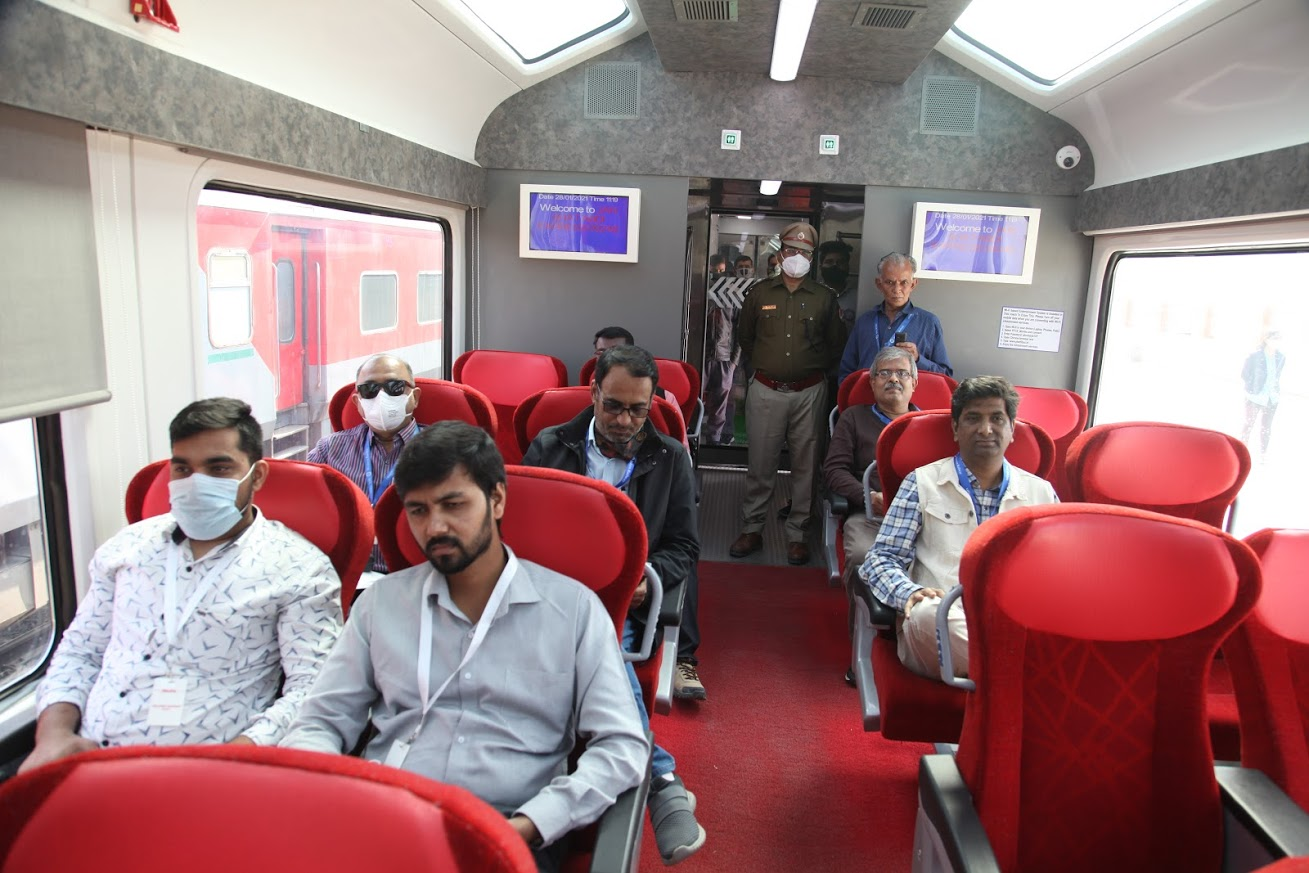
Vistadome Coach of Kevadiya-Ahmedabad Janshatabdi Express

== 125 years of Western Railway Headquarters Building ==
Western Railway Headquarters Building constructed in the year 1899 will be completing 125 years in January 2024. The Headquarters building was designed by renowned architect, Frederick William Stevens. Stevens successfully blended the Venetian Gothic and Indian Sarcenic styles, creating in the process a style excellently adapted to the climate and environment of Bombay and the superb vantage site on which the building was constructed. Initially, Rs 4,75,000 were sanctioned for the building plus Rs 50,000 for the architect's design fees. The final estimate including a supplementary estimate of Rs 83,426 sanctioned was Rs 7,52,556. F W Stevens appointed Raosaheb Sitaram Khanderao Vaidya as the resident engineer. He had worked with Stevens in same capacity on Municipal Building and other projects. He also appointed Ranganath Krishna Deshmukh as assistant to Resident Engineer Khanderao. F W Stevens was also assisted by his son, Charles Fedrick Stevens, who worked as Chief Assistant with him. Charles Fedrick Stevens is known for Art Deco style designs for buildings in Bombay including the famous Regal Cinema building.

The completed building with a 276 foot we276-footstern façade supporting a central tower of 160 feet was an imposing sight facing the sea situated at the intersection of Churchgate Street (Veer Nariman Road) and Queen's road (Maharashi Karve road). As detailed by Stevens, the outline and massing were the most prominent and defining character of the building which was otherwise plain because it lacked ornament. The unique central tower was square from the base up to 100 feet, then became an octagon diminishing into a smaller octagon culminating in a circular dome. This dome was noticeable from all parts of Esplanade and formed a new landmark for ships entering Bombay. Two porches on the western and southern façades provided additional character to the building. A sculpture of ‘Engineering’ made in Bath stone was placed atop the central gable. The sculpture consisted of a lady accompanied by two children on either side, with her holding a locomotive in her right hand while supporting herself on a wheel to her left. Seven other carved figures in Porebunder stone of griffins holding BB&CI monogrammed shield were placed on smaller gables. Statues of Colonel French and Colonel Kennedy were placed between the arches of carriage porch on west. The flawless Porebunder stone was brought from a four mile long quarry in the Kathiawar region in today's Gujarat. The bases of columns and piers were of finely dressed Coorla(Kurla) stone and Kalyan brock and lime masonry for jams, piers and coigns. Chamfered and moulded arches were made of finely dressed Porebunder and Dhrangdhara red stone. Blue basalt stone was used for long steps of overhanging staircase provided with ornamental railing of wrought iron topped with French polished teak handrail. The domes, mouldings, capitals, columns, cornices and carved enrichments in Porebunder stone, white Coorla (Kurla) and Dhrangdhara red stone were in synergy with neighboring buildings.

Western Railway has planned a series of activities to mark completion of 125 years which include the restoration of this heritage building, Exhibitions, conduction heritage tours etc.

== Heritage Gallery, Mumbai ==
Conserving heritage, Western Railway has opened Heritage Gallery at its headquarters building at Churchgate, Mumbai. The Gallery has recently been renovated. It is a collection of various models of BB&CI era, the precursor of Western Railway. Many notes of agents of BB&CI dating back to 1860s have also been displayed. Suburban timetable of 1948, steam engine model, signalling equipment, Model of 1928 EMUs, working model of Auxiliary Warning System, etc. have been beautifully displayed.

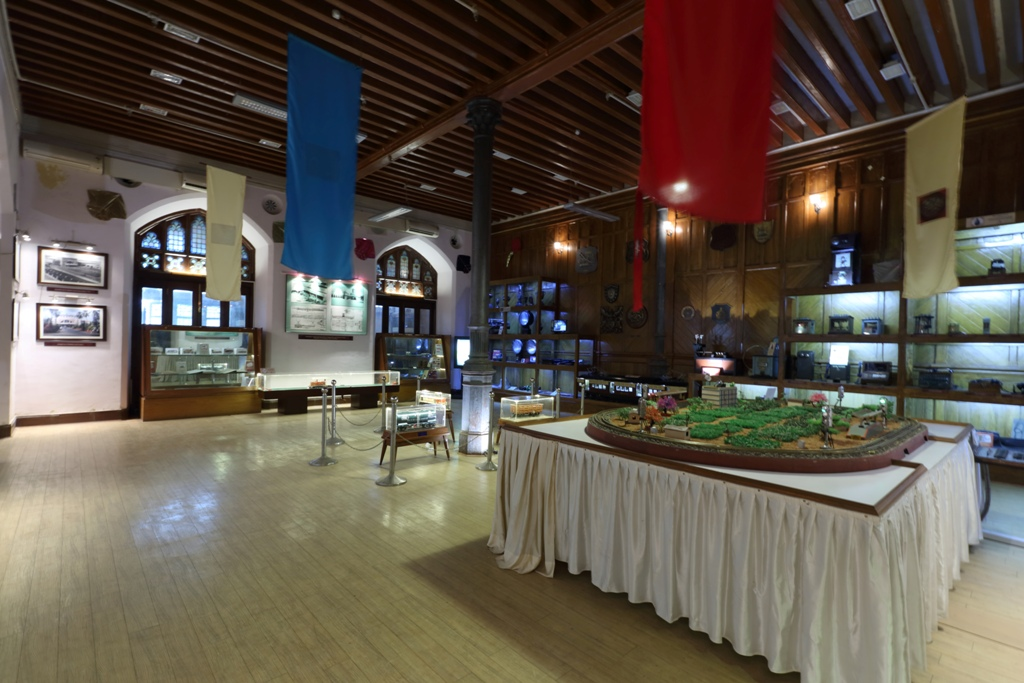
A view of Heritage Gallery, at Western Railway Headquarters, Churchgate, Mumbai

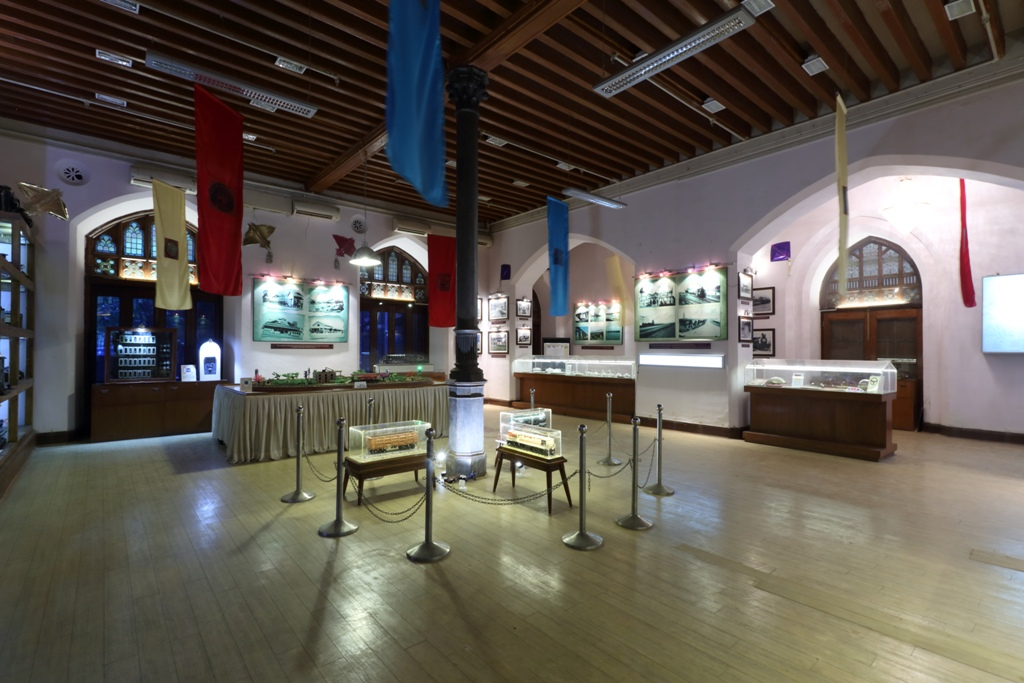
Heritage Gallery of Western Railway at Churchgate, Mumbai

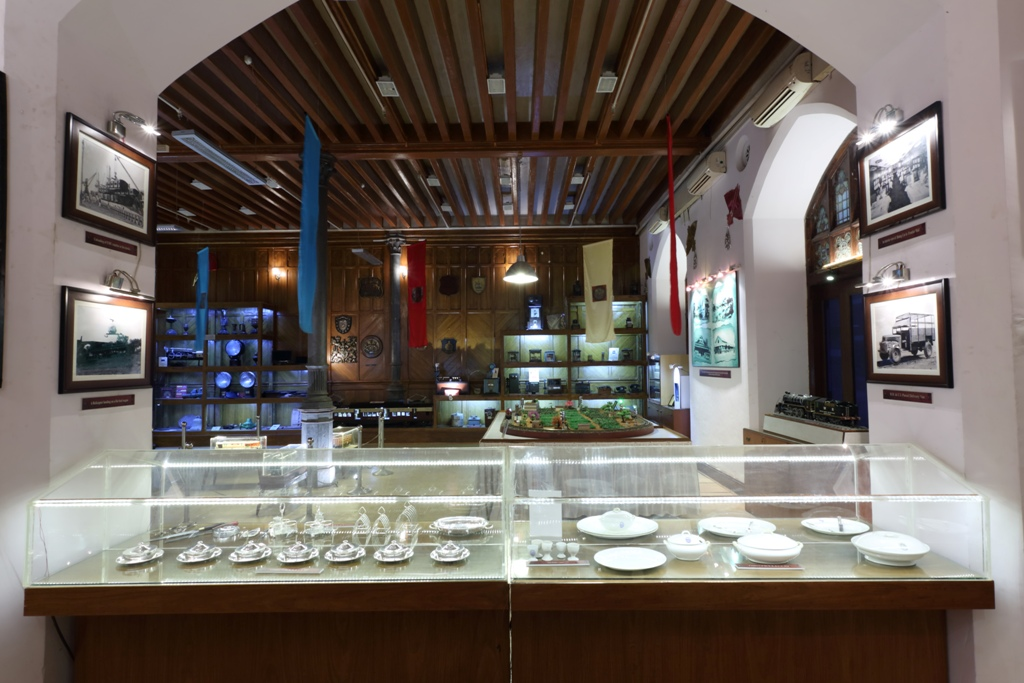
Artifacts displayed in the gallery

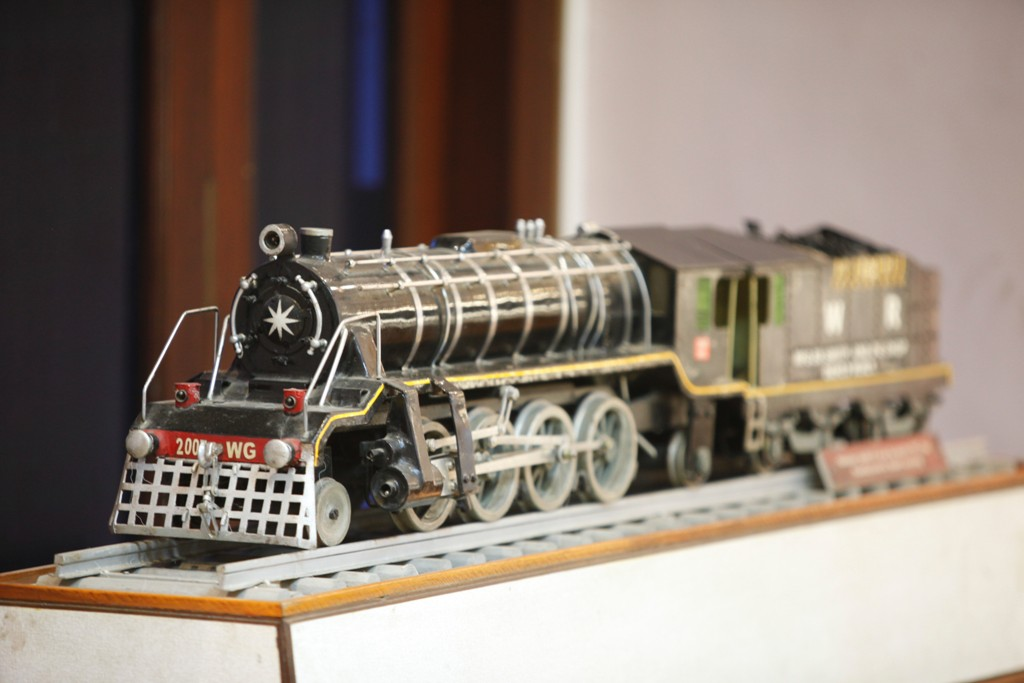
Model of steam engine on display

The gallery gives an insight about the development of lines on Western Region of India. The BB&CI map dating back to 1930s shows us that the Western line started from Mumbai via Vadodara, Ratlam connected GIP Railway at Mathura to reach Delhi and further Peshawar. The Frontier Mail (Golden Temple Mail) used to run up to Peshawar. The Gallery is open for public free of cost during working hours and on special occasions.

== Divisions ==
- Mumbai WR railway division
- Ahmedabad railway division
- Vadodara railway division
- Ratlam railway division
- Rajkot railway division
- Bhavnagar railway division

== Trains ==
Some of the major trains operated by Western Railway zone are as follows:

Number	Train Name	Starting Station	Terminating Station	AC available
12951/12952	Mumbai Rajdhani Express	Mumbai Central	New Delhi	Yes
12953/12954	August Kranti Rajdhani Express	Mumbai Central	Hazrat Nizamuddin	Yes
12907/12908	Maharashtra Sampark Kranti Express	Bandra Terminus	Hazrat Nizamuddin	Yes
12925/12926	Paschim Express	Mumbai Central	Amritsar Jn.	Yes
12909/12910	Bandra Terminus–Hazrat Nizamuddin Garib Rath Express	Bandra Terminus	Hazrat Nizamuddin	Yes
12247/12248	Bandra Terminus–Hazrat Nizamuddin Yuva Express	Bandra Terminus	Hazrat Nizamuddin	Yes
12901/12902	Gujarat Mail	Dadar Western	Ahmedabad Jn.	Yes
22209/22210	Mumbai Central–Hazrat Nizamuddin Duronto Express	Mumbai Central	Hazrat Nizamuddin	Yes
12903/12904	Golden Temple Mail	Mumbai Central	Amritsar Jn.	Yes
12267/12268	Mumbai Central–Hapa Duronto Express	Mumbai Central	Hapa	Yes
12239/12240	Mumbai Central–Hisar Duronto Express	Mumbai Central	Hisar	Yes
12961/12962	Avantika Express	Mumbai Central	Indore Jn.	Yes
12921/12922	Flying Ranee	Mumbai Central	Surat	No
12933/12934	Karnavati Express	Mumbai Central	Ahmedabad Jn.	Yes
12009/12010	Mumbai Central–Ahmedabad Shatabdi Express	Mumbai Central	Ahmedabad Jn.	Yes
20901/20902	Mumbai Central - Gandhinagar Capital Vande Bharat Express	Mumbai Central	Gandhinagar Capital	Yes

== Major routes ==
- New Delhi–Mumbai main line
- Ahmedabad–Mumbai main line
- Ahmedabad–Delhi main line
- Jaipur–Ahmedabad line
- Udhna–Jalgaon line
- Gandhidham–Ahmedabad main line
- Viramgam–Okha line
- Surendranagar–Bhavnagar line
- Jamnagar–Porbandar line
- Rajkot–Somnath line
- Gandhidham–Palanpur section
- Gandhidham–Bhuj section
- Gandhidham–Kandla Port section
- Gandhidham–Samakhiali section
- Porbandar–Jetalsar section
- Maliya Miyana–Wankaner section
- Rajkot–Wankaner section
- Viramgam–Mahesana section
- Viramgam–Maliya Miyana section
- Viramgam–Surendra Nagar section
- Wankaner–Surendra Nagar section
- Dharangadhra–Surendra Nagar section
- Samakhiali–Maliya Miyana section
- Ujjain–Bhopal section

== Major stations ==
- Ahmedabad Junction
- Amalner
- Anand Junction
- Andheri
- Ankleshwar Junction
- Badnagar
- Bandra Terminus
- Bharuch Junction
- Bhavnagar Terminus
- Bhildi Junction
- Bhuj
- Bilimora Junction
- Boisar
- Borivali
- Botad Junction
- Chhayapuri
- Chittaurgarh Junction
- Churchgate
- Dabhoi Junction
- Dadar
- Dahanu Road
- Dahod
- Dewas Junction
- Dhola Junction
- Dhrangadhra Junction
- Dondaicha
- Dr. Ambedkar Nagar (Mhow)
- Fatehabad Chandrawatiganj Junction
- Gandhidham Junction
- Gandhinagar Capital
- Godhra Junction
- Goregaon
- Hapa
- Indore Junction
- Jamnagar
- Jaora
- Jetalsar Junction
- Junagadh Junction
- Kalol Junction
- Mahesana Junction
- Mahuva Junction
- Maliya Miyana Junction
- Mandsaur
- Maninagar
- Meghnagar
- Morbi
- Mumbai Central
- Nadiad Junction
- Nagda Junction
- Nandurbar
- Navapur
- Navsari
- Neemuch
- Okha
- Palanpur Junction
- Palghar
- Palitana
- Pardi
- Patan Junction
- Porbandar
- Rajkot Junction
- Ratlam Junction
- Sabarmati Junction
- Saphale
- Siddhpur
- Sihor Junction
- Somnath
- Surat
- Surendranagar Junction
- Udhna Junction
- Ujjain Junction
- Unjha
- Vadodara Junction
- Valsad
- Vapi
- Vasai Road
- Veraval Junction
- Viramgam Junction
- Virar
- Vyara
- Wankaner Junction

== Loco sheds ==
- Electric Loco Shed, Vadodara
- Electric Loco Shed, Valsad
- Diesel Loco Shed, Vatva
- Diesel Loco Shed, Sabarmati
- Diesel Loco Shed, Ratlam
- Diesel Loco Shed, Gandhidham
- Diesel Loco Shed, Mhow (MG loco shed)
- Diesel Loco Shed, Pratapnagar (NG loco shed)

== See also ==
- Zones and divisions of Indian Railways
- All India Station Masters' Association (AISMA)
