= Adipur Junction railway station =

Railway station in Gujarat, India

Adipur Junction railway station

General information
- Location: Adipur, Gujarat; India
- Coordinates: 23°04′36″N 70°04′41″E
- System: Indian Railways station
- Owner: Ministry of Railways, Indian Railways
- Operator: Western Railway
- Line: Gandhidham–Bhuj section
- Platforms: 2
- Tracks: 2

Construction
- Structure type: Standard (on ground)
- Parking: No

Other information
- Status: Functioning
- Station code: AI
- Zone(s): Western Railway
- Division(s): Ahmedabad
Location
- Location within India Location within Gujarat

Adipur Junction railway station is a railway station in Kutch district, Gujarat, India on the Western line of the Western railway network. Adipur Junction railway station is 49 km far away from Bhuj. It is connected to Mundra Port by rail.

== Nearby stations ==
Gandhidham is nearest railway station towards Gandhidham Junction, whereas Anjar is nearest railway station towards Bhuj.

== Major trains ==
Following trains halt at Adipur Junction railway station:

- 19115/16 Sayajinagari Express
- 22955/56 Kutch Express
- 14321/22 Ala Hazrat Express (via Bhildi)
- 14311/12 Ala Hazrat Express (via Ahmedabad)
- 11091/92 Bhuj–Pune Express
- 19151/52 Palanpur–Bhuj Intercity Express
- 22829/30 Shalimar–Bhuj Weekly Superfast Express
