= Anjar railway station =

Railway station in Gujarat, India

Anjar railway station

General information
- Location: Anjar, Gujarat; India
- Coordinates: 23°07′10″N 70°02′11″E
- System: Indian Railways station
- Owner: Ministry of Railways, Indian Railways
- Operator: Western Railway
- Line: Gandhidham–Bhuj section
- Platforms: 1
- Tracks: 1

Construction
- Structure type: Standard (on ground)
- Parking: No

Other information
- Status: Functioning
- Station code: AJE
- Zone(s): Western Railway
- Division(s): Ahmedabad
Location
- Location within India Location within Gujarat

Anjar railway station is a railway station in Kutch district, Gujarat, India on the Western line of the Western Railway network. Anjar railway station is 42 km away from Bhuj.

== Nearby stations ==
Adipur Junction is the nearest railway station towards Gandhidham Junction, whereas Sapda is the nearest railway station towards Bhuj.

== Major trains ==
Following trains halt at Anjar railway station:

- 19115/16 Sayajinagari Express
- 22955/56 Kutch Express
- 14321/22 Ala Hazrat Express (via Bhildi)
- 14311/12 Ala Hazrat Express (via Ahmedabad)
- 11091/92 Bhuj–Pune Express
- 19151/52 Palanpur–Bhuj Intercity Express
