= Dhrangadhra Junction railway station =

Railway station in Gujarat, India

Dhrangadhra Junction

General information
- Location: Dhrangadhra, Gujarat; India
- Coordinates: 22°59′13″N 71°28′45″E
- Elevation: 54 m (177 ft)
- System: Indian Railways station
- Owner: Indian Railways
- Operator: Western Railway
- Lines: Gandhidham–Ahmedabad main line Dharangadhra–Surendra Nagar section
- Platforms: 3
- Tracks: 6

Construction
- Structure type: Standard (on-ground station)
- Parking: Yes

Other information
- Status: Functioning
- Station code: DHG
- Zone(s): Western Railway
- Division(s): Ahmedabad

History
- Opened: 1905
- Former names: Morvi State Railway
Location
- Location within India Location within Gujarat

Dhrangadhra Junction railway station is a major railway station in Dhrangadhra town of Surendranagar district, Gujarat. It serves Dhrangadhra town. Its code is DHG. DEMU, Passenger, Express, and Superfast trains halt here. Two trains start from here.

Dhrangadhra Junction is connected by rail to Bandra Terminus, Dadar, Puri, Visakhapatnam Junction, Nagercoil, Shri Mata Vaishno Devi Katra, Bareilly Junction, Bangalore City, Pune Junction, Gandhidham Junction, Howrah Junction, Bhuj and Shalimar.

== Trains ==
- 22955/56 Kutch Express
- 12993/94 Gandhidham–Puri Weekly Superfast Express
- 18501/02 Visakhapatnam–Gandhidham Express
- 19115/16 Sayajinagari Express
- 14311/12 Ala Hazrat Express (via Ahmedabad)
- 16505/06 Gandhidham–Bangalore City Express
- 16335/36 Gandhidham–Nagercoil Express
- 11091/92 Bhuj–Pune Express
- 22829/30 Shalimar–Bhuj Weekly Superfast Express
- 12937/38 Garbha Express
- 12473/74 Gandhidham–Shri Mata Vaishno Devi Katra Sarvodaya Express

== History ==
Dhrangadhra Railway was owned by Princely state of Dhrangadhra. It was opened to traffic in 1898.

== See also ==
Dhrangadhra Railway
