= Halvad railway station =

Railway station in Gujarat, India

Halvad

General information
- Location: Halvad, Gujarat; India
- Coordinates: 23°01′06″N 71°11′01″E
- Elevation: 45 metres (148 ft)
- System: Indian Railway Station
- Owner: Ministry of Railways, Indian Railways
- Operator: Western Railway
- Line: Gandhidham–Ahmedabad main line
- Platforms: 1
- Tracks: 1

Construction
- Structure type: Standard (On Ground)
- Parking: No

Other information
- Status: Functioning
- Station code: HVD
- Zone(s): Western Railway
- Division(s): Ahmedabad
Location
- Location within India Location within Gujarat

Halvad railway station is a railway station in Morbi district, Gujarat, India on the Western line of the Western railway. It serves Halvad town. Halvad railway station is 162 km far away from Ahmedabad Junction. Railway Yard is started at Sukhpar Terminal of Halvad. Three Express and two Superfast trains halt here.

== Nearby Stations ==
Dhanala is the nearest railway station towards Gandhidham Junction, whereas Sukhpar is the nearest railway station towards Ahmedabad Junction.

== Major Trains ==
Following Express and Superfast trains halt at Halvad railway station in both direction:

- 19115/16 Dadar - Bhuj Sayajinagari Express
- 22955/56 Bandra Terminus - Bhuj Kutch Superfast Express
- 14311/12 Ala Hazrat Express (via Ahmedabad)
- 11091/92 Bhuj - Pune Express
