= Gandhidham–Kandla Port section =

Indian railway line

Overview
- Status: Operational
- Owner: Indian Railways
- Locale: Gujarat
- Termini: Gandhidham; Kandla Port

Service
- System: Freight
- Operator: Western Railway

History
- Opened: 1930

Technical
- Track length: 11 km (7 mi)
- Num of tracks: 2
- Track gauge: 5 ft 6 in (1,676 mm)
- Electrification: Yes

The Gandhidham–Kandla Port section is a railway line in the Kutch district of Gujarat, operating under the Western Railway zone of Indian Railways.

== History ==
The railway was financed by Maharao Khengarji Bawa of Kutch, with the initial section to Anjar opening in 1905. An extension from Anjar to Bhuj opened in 1908, followed by a 15-mile (24 km) branch from Anjar to Kandla in 1930. The Cutch State Railway was later integrated into the Western Railway on 5 November 1951.

== Route ==
The section connects Gandhidham to Kandla Port and is primarily used for freight operations serving the port.
