= Samakhiali Junction railway station =

Railway station in Gujarat

Samakhiali Junction
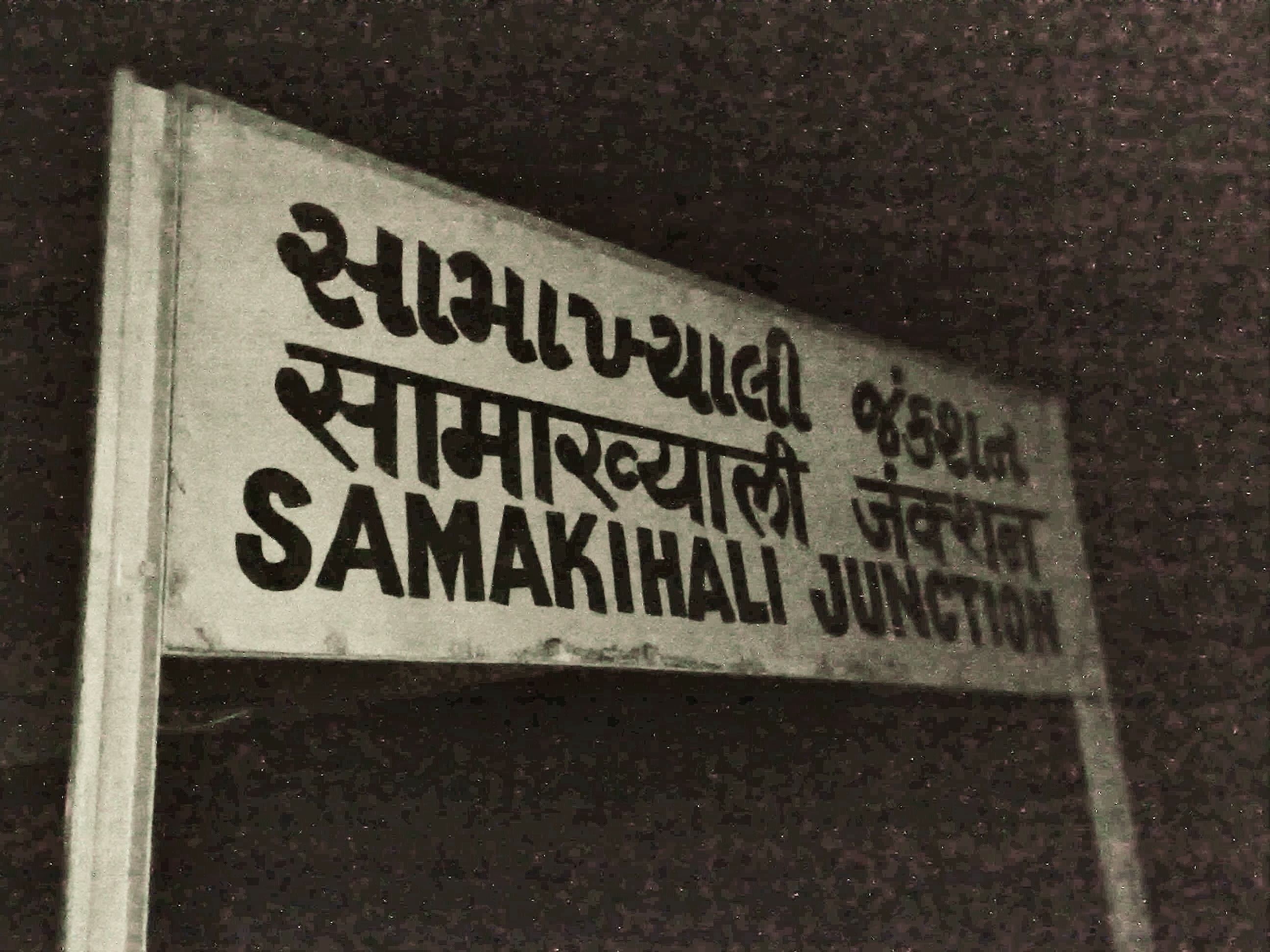

General information
- Location: Samakhiali, Kutch, Gujarat; India
- Coordinates: 23°18′35″N 70°30′11″E
- Elevation: 42 m (138 ft)
- System: Indian Railways station
- Owner: Indian Railways
- Operator: Western Railway
- Lines: Gandhidham–Palanpur section Samakhiali–Maliya Miyana section
- Platforms: 3
- Tracks: 5

Construction
- Structure type: Standard (on-ground station)
- Parking: Yes

Other information
- Status: Functioning
- Station code: SIOB
- Zone(s): Western Railway
- Division(s): Ahmedabad

History
- Opened: 1950
- Former names: Cutch State Railway
Location
- Location within India Location within Gujarat

Samakhiali Junction railway station is a railway station belonging to the Western Railway of Ahmedabad division.

== History ==
The railway ran north from the port of Tuna towards Anjar in the Kutch. The railway was financed by the Maharao Khengarji Bawa of Cutch, and the initial section to Anjar was opened in 1905. An extension from Anjar to the state capital of Bhuj was later made and lines opened in 1908. Varshamedi to Bhachau was opened in 1910. 15 miles from Anjar to Kandla was opened in 1930. Another line was laid from Kandla to Disa in 1950. Samakhiali railway station was opened during this time.

== Railway reorganization ==
Kutch State Railway was merged into the Western Railway on 5 November 1951, at which time the total length was 72 miles. After the gauge conversion of Viramgam–Wankaner–Gandhidham section in the earlier 1980s. The first train from Gandhidham to Mumbai was introduced on 2 Oct 1984. Gauge conversion of Palanpur–Gandhidham was completed on 24 March 2006. New services were introduced via Palanpur.

== Major trains ==
- 15667/68 Kamakhya–Gandhidham Express
- 12937/38 Garba Superfast Express
- 22973/74 Gandhidham–Puri Weekly Express
- 12993/94 Gandhidham–Puri Weekly Superfast Express
- 18501/02 Visakhapatnam–Gandhidham Express
- 22483/84 Gandhidham–Jodhpur Express
- 16505/06 KSR Bangalore–Gandhidham Express
- 16335/36 Gandhidham–Nagercoil Express
- 59425/26 Gandhidham–Palanpur Passenger
- 19335/36 Gandhidham–Indore Weekly Express
- 12473/74 Gandhidham–Shri Mata Vaishno Devi Katra Sarvodaya Express
- 19115/16 Sayajinagari Express
- 22955/56 Kutch Express
- 14321/22 Ala Hazrat Express (via Bhildi)
- 14311/12 Ala Hazrat Express (via Mahesana)
- 11091/92 Bhuj–Pune Express
- 19151/52 Palanpur–Bhuj Intercity Express
- 22829/30 Shalimar–Bhuj Weekly Superfast Express
- 12959/60 Dadar–Bhuj Superfast Express
