= Bhuj–Pune Express =

Train in India

Bhuj - Pune Express
Overview
- Service type: Express
- Current operator: Central Railway zone

Route
- Termini: Bhuj (BHUJ); Pune Junction (PUNE)
- Stops: 23
- Distance travelled: 985 km (612 mi)
- Average journey time: 19 hours 45 minutes
- Service frequency: Weekly (Note: Runs one days in a week for every direction.)
- Train number: 11091/11092

On-board services
- Classes: AC First Class, AC 2 tier, AC 3 tier, Sleeper Class, General Unreserved
- Seating arrangements: Yes
- Sleeping arrangements: Yes
- Catering facilities: E-Catering; On-board Catering
- Observation facilities: Rake sharing with 11087/11088, 11089/11090, 11091/11092, 11095/11096, 12103/12104
- Entertainment facilities: No

Technical
- Rolling stock: 2
- Track gauge: 1,676 mm (5 ft 6 in)
- Operating speed: 50 km/h (31 mph)

The 11091/11092 Bhuj - Pune Express is an express train of the Indian Railways connecting Pune in Maharashtra and Bhuj of Kutch. It is currently being operated with 11091/11092 train numbers on a weekly basis.

== Coach composition ==
The train has standard ICF rakes with max speed of 110 kmph. The train consists of 22 coaches :

- 1 AC First Class
- 1 AC II Tier
- 6 AC III Tier
- 10 Sleeper Coaches
- 2 General Unreserved
- 2 Seating cum Luggage Rake

Loco	1	2	3	4	5	6	7	8	9	10	11	12	13	14	15	16	17	18	19	20	21	22
	SLR	GEN	A1	H1	B1	B2	B3	B4	B5	B6	S1	S2	S3	S4	S5	S6	S7	S8	S9	S10	GEN	SLR

== Service ==
The 11091/Bhuj - Pune Express has an average speed of 50 km/h and covers 985 km in 19 hrs 45 mins.

The 11092/Pune - Bhuj Express has an average speed of 51 km/h and covers 985 km in 19 hrs 30 mins.

As the average speed of the train is below 55 km/h, its fare does not include a superfast surcharge.

== Route and halts ==
The important halts of the train are:

- Bhuj
- Anjar
- Adipur Junction
- Gandhidham Junction
- Bhachau
- Samakhiali Junction
- Halvad
- Dhrangadhra Junction
- Viramgam Junction
- Ahmedabad Junction
- Nadiad Junction
- Anand Junction
- Vadodara Junction
- Bharuch Junction
- Surat
- Navsari
- Valsad
- Vapi
- Vasai Road
- Bhiwandi Road
- Kalyan Junction
- Karjat
- Lonavala
- Shivaji Nagar
- Pune Junction

== Schedule ==
Train Number	Station Code	Departure Station	Departure Time	Departure Day	Arrival Station	Arrival Time	Arrival Day
11091	BHUJ	Bhuj	08:55 AM	Wed	Pune Junction	04:40 AM	Thu
11092	PUNE	Pune Junction	19:50 PM	Mon	Bhuj	15:20 PM	Tue

== Rake sharing ==
The train shares its rake with:

- 11087/11088 Veraval - Pune Express
- 11089/11090 Bhagat Ki Kothi – Pune Express
- 11095/11096 Ahimsa Express
- 12103/12104 Pune - Lucknow Superfast Express

== Direction reversal ==
Train reverses its direction one times at:

- Gandhidham Junction

== Traction ==
Both trains are hauled by a Vatva Loco Shed based WDP-4 from Bhuj to Ahmedabad and from Ahmedabad it is hauled by a Vadodara Loco Shed based WAP-5 Electric loco shed, Valsad based WAP4 electric locomotive up til Pune.
