= Gandhidham–Indore Weekly Express =

Train in India

Gandhidham-Indore Weekly Express
Overview
- Service type: Express
- First service: 3 February 2019; 6 years ago
- Current operator(s): Western Railway

Route
- Termini: Gandhidham Junction (GIMB); Indore Junction (INDB)
- Stops: 9
- Distance travelled: 806 km (501 mi)
- Average journey time: 16 hrs 30 mins
- Service frequency: Weekly
- Train number(s): 19335 / 19336

On-board services
- Class(es): AC 2 tier, AC 3 tier, Sleeper Class, General Unreserved
- Seating arrangements: Yes
- Sleeping arrangements: Yes
- Catering facilities: E-Catering
- Observation facilities: Large windows
- Baggage facilities: No
- Other facilities: Below the seats

Technical
- Rolling stock: LHB coach
- Track gauge: 5 ft 6 in (1,676 mm)
- Operating speed: 48 km/h (30 mph) average including halts.

The 19335 / 19336 Gandhidham - Indore Weekly Express is an express train belonging to Western Railway zone that runs between Gandhidham Junction and Indore Junction. It is currently being operated with 19335/19336 train numbers on a weekly basis.

== Coach composition ==
The train has LHB rakes with max speed of 130 kmph. The train consists of 16 coaches :

- 1 AC II Tier
- 2 AC III Tier
- 7 Sleeper Class
- 4 General Unreserved
- 2 Seating cum Luggage Rake

== Service ==
The 19335/Gandhidham - Indore Weekly Express runs with an average speed of 46 km/h and completes 806 km in 17 hrs 25 mins.

The 19336/Indore - Gandhidham Weekly Express runs with an average speed of 51 km/h and completes 806 km in 15 hrs 45 mins.

== Route and halts ==
The important halts of the train are:

- Gandhidham Junction
- Samakhiali Junction
- Viramgam Junction
- Ahmedabad Junction
- Nadiad Junction
- Godhra Junction
- Dahod
- Ratlam Junction
- Ujjain Junction
- Dewas Junction
- Indore Junction

== See also ==
- Gandhidham Junction railway station
- Indore Junction railway station
