= Tirunelveli–Gandhidham Humsafar Express =

Train in India

Tirunelveli - Gandhidham Humsafar Express

Overview
- Service type: Humsafar Express
- First service: 5 July 2018; 7 years ago (inaugural run); 16 July 2018; 7 years ago (regular service)
- Current operator(s): Western Railways

Route
- Termini: Tirunelveli Junction (TEN); Gandhidham Junction (GIMB)
- Stops: 21
- Distance travelled: 2,400 km (1,491 mi)
- Average journey time: 45 hours 10 mins
- Service frequency: Weekly (Note: Runs once in a week for every direction.)
- Train number(s): 20923 / 20924

On-board services
- Class(es): AC 3 tier, Sleeper class
- Seating arrangements: Yes
- Sleeping arrangements: Yes
- Catering facilities: Available
- Observation facilities: Large windows
- Baggage facilities: No

Technical
- Rolling stock: LHB Humsafar
- Track gauge: 1,676 mm (5 ft 6 in)
- Operating speed: 54 km/h (34 mph) average including halts
- Rake maintenance: Gandhidham Junction

The 20923 / 20924 Tirunelveli - Gandhidham Humsafar Express is a superfast express train belonging to Western Railway zone that runs between Gandhidham Junction and Tirunelveli Junction in India.

It was announced to be operated with 19423/19424 train numbers on weekly basis.

The inaugural special service of Gandhidham - Tirunelveli Humsafar Express (09424) was flagged off by Minister of States of Railways Rajen Gohain on 5 July 2018. The regular service started from 16th of that month.

== Coach composition ==
The Tirunelveli – Gandhidham Humsafar Express operates with 3-Tier AC coaches and sleeper class coaches with LED screens to display information about stations, train speed etc. and has announcement system as well, Vending machines for tea, coffee and milk, Bio toilets in compartments as well as CCTV cameras.

Loco	1	2	3	4	5	6	7	8	9	10	11	12	13	14	15	16	17	18	19	20	21	22	23	24
	EOG	B12	B11	B10	B9	B8	B7	B6	B5	B4	B3	B2	B1	PC	S9	S8	S7	S6	S5	S4	S3	S2	S1	EOG

== Traction ==
Both trains are hauled by a Vadodara Loco Shed based WAP-7 electric locomotive on its entire journey.

== Demands ==
There are also demands to extend this train from Tirunelveli Junction to Madurai Junction.There is also demand that the train needed stopping in Valliyoor (VLY) and Parassala (PASA) railway station.

== See also ==
- Humsafar Express
