= Dharangadhra–Surendra Nagar section =

Railway line in Gujarat, India

Dharangadhra–Surendranagar section

Overview
- Status: Operational
- Owner: Indian Railways
- Locale: Gujarat
- Termini: Dharangadhra; Surendranagar

Service
- Operator(s): Western Railway

History
- Opened: 1905

Technical
- Track length: 35 km (22 mi)
- Number of tracks: 1
- Track gauge: 5 ft 6 in (1,676 mm) broad gauge
- Electrification: Yes

The Dharangadhra–Surendranagar section belongs to Western Railway of Ahmedabad Division.

== History ==
The Dharangadhra–Surendranagar line was opened in 1905 by Dhrangadhra Railway. The gauge conversion of this section completed in 2011. This line belongs to Dhrangadhra Railway during the Princely rule.

== Rail traffic ==
Only one passenger train passes through this line at present. Another passenger train was announced in Rail budget 2013.
