= Sayajinagari Express =

Train in India

Sayaji Nagari Express
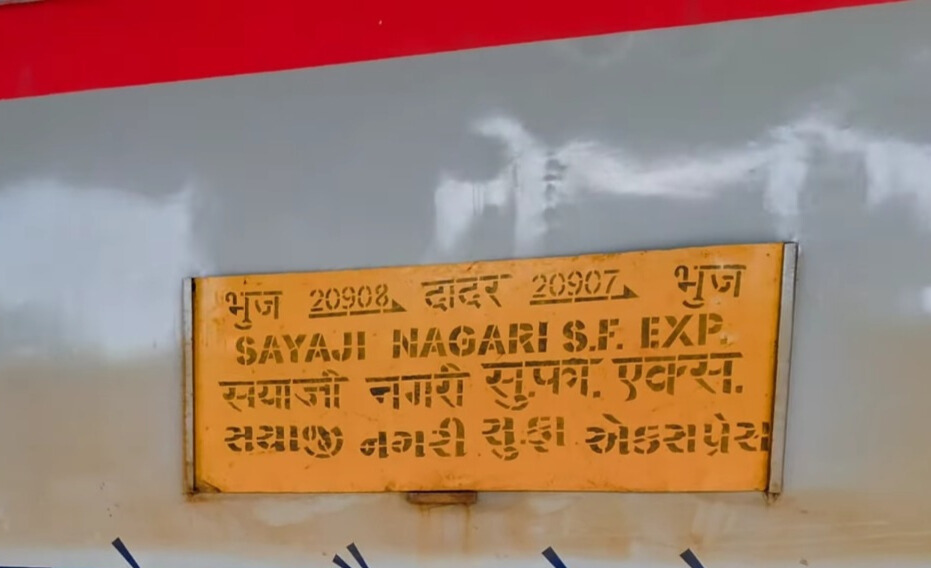
- Sayajinagari Express train board.

Overview
- Service type: Superfast
- Locale: Maharashtra & Gujarat
- First service: 1 January 2001; 25 years ago
- Current operator: Western Railway

Route
- Termini: Dadar (DDR); Bhuj (BHUJ)
- Stops: 26
- Distance travelled: 845 km (525 mi)
- Average journey time: 15 hours 15 minutes
- Service frequency: Daily
- Train number: 20907 / 20908

On-board services
- Classes: AC First, AC 2 tier, AC 3 tier, Sleeper class, General Unreserved
- Seating arrangements: Yes
- Sleeping arrangements: Yes
- Catering facilities: On-board catering, E-catering
- Observation facilities: Large windows
- Baggage facilities: Available
- Other facilities: Below the seats

Technical
- Rolling stock: LHB coach
- Track gauge: 1,676 mm (5 ft 6 in)
- Operating speed: 55 km/h (34 mph) average including halts
Route map
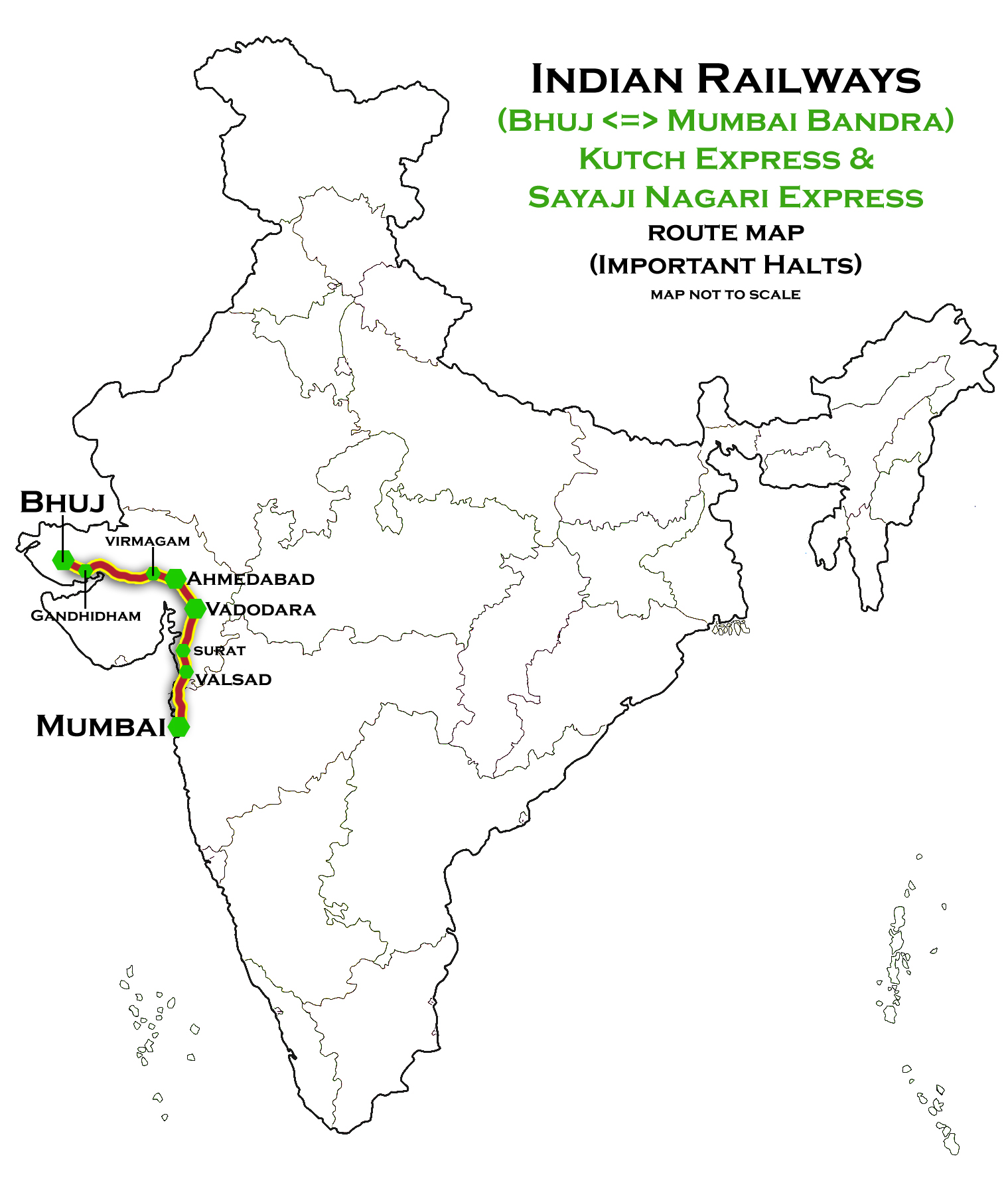

The 20907 / 20908 Sayaji Nagari Express is a Superfast train belonging to Indian Railways that runs between Dadar and Bhuj. It operates as train number 20907 from Dadar to Bhuj and as train number 20908 in the reverse direction. It is a daily service.

== Coaches ==
The Sayajinagari Express has 1 AC 1st Class, 2 AC 2 tier, 6 AC 3 tier, 7 Sleeper class, 4 General unreserved and 2 EOG cum sleeper & luggage. As with most train services in India, coach composition may be amended at the discretion of Indian Railways depending on demand.

Loco	1	2	3	4	5	6	7	8	9	10	11	12	13	14	15	16	17	18	19	20	21	22
	EOG	H1	A1	A2	B1	B2	B3	B4	B5	B6	S7	S6	S5	S4	S3	S2	S1	UR	UR	UR	UR	EOG

== Service ==
The Sayajinagri Express covers the distance of 839 km in 15 hours 15 mins as 20907 Sayajinagri Express averaging 55 km/h & 15 hours 15 mins as 20908 Sayajinagri Express averaging 55 km/h. As the average speed of the train in both directions is 55 km/h.

It is one of 2 daily trains between Mumbai & Bhuj, the other being Kutch Express. It has 29 halts as opposed to 22 halts for Kutch Express.

== Route & halts ==
They important halts of the train are:

- Dadar
- Borivali
- Dahanu Road
- Vapi
- Valsad
- Bilimora Junction
- Navsari
- Surat
- Kosamba Junction
- Ankleshwar Junction
- Bharuch Junction
- Vadodara Junction
- Anand Junction
- Nadiad Junction
- Maninagar
- Ahmedabad Junction
- Viramgam Junction
- Dhrangadhra Junction
- Maliya Miyana Junction
- Samakhiali Junction
- Bhachau
- Gandhidham Junction
- Anjar
- Bhuj

== Schedule ==
Train number	Station code	Departure station	Departure time	Departure day	Arrival station	Arrival time	Arrival day
20907	DDR	Dadar	15:15 PM	Daily	Bhuj	06:30 AM	Daily
20908	BHUJ	Bhuj	22:35 PM	Daily	Dadar	13:50 PM	Daily

== Traction ==
Both trains are hauled by a Vadodara Loco Shed-based WAP-7 electric locomotive from Dadar Western to Bhuj and vice versa

== Images ==
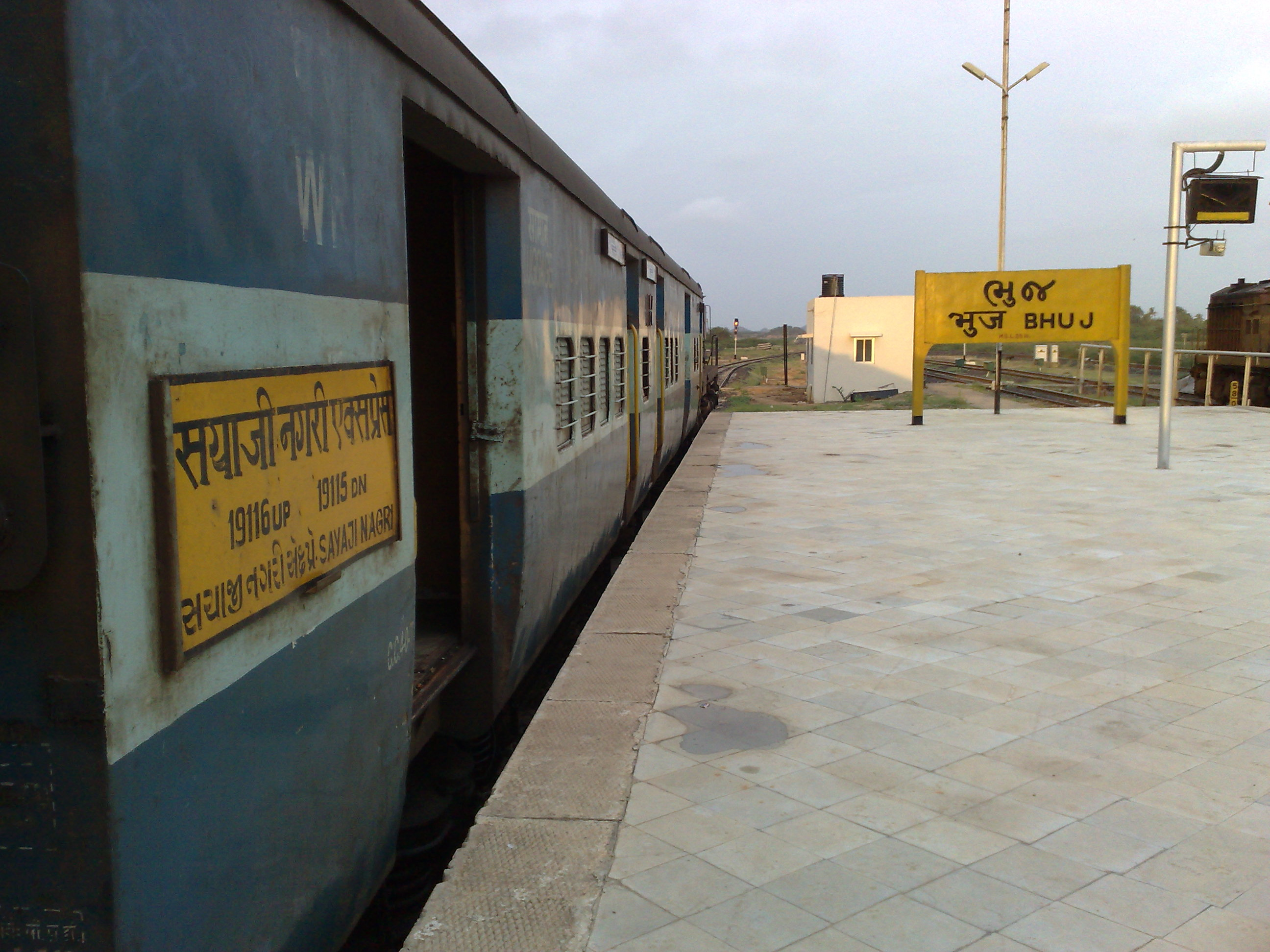
20908 Sayajinagri Express at Bhuj railway station

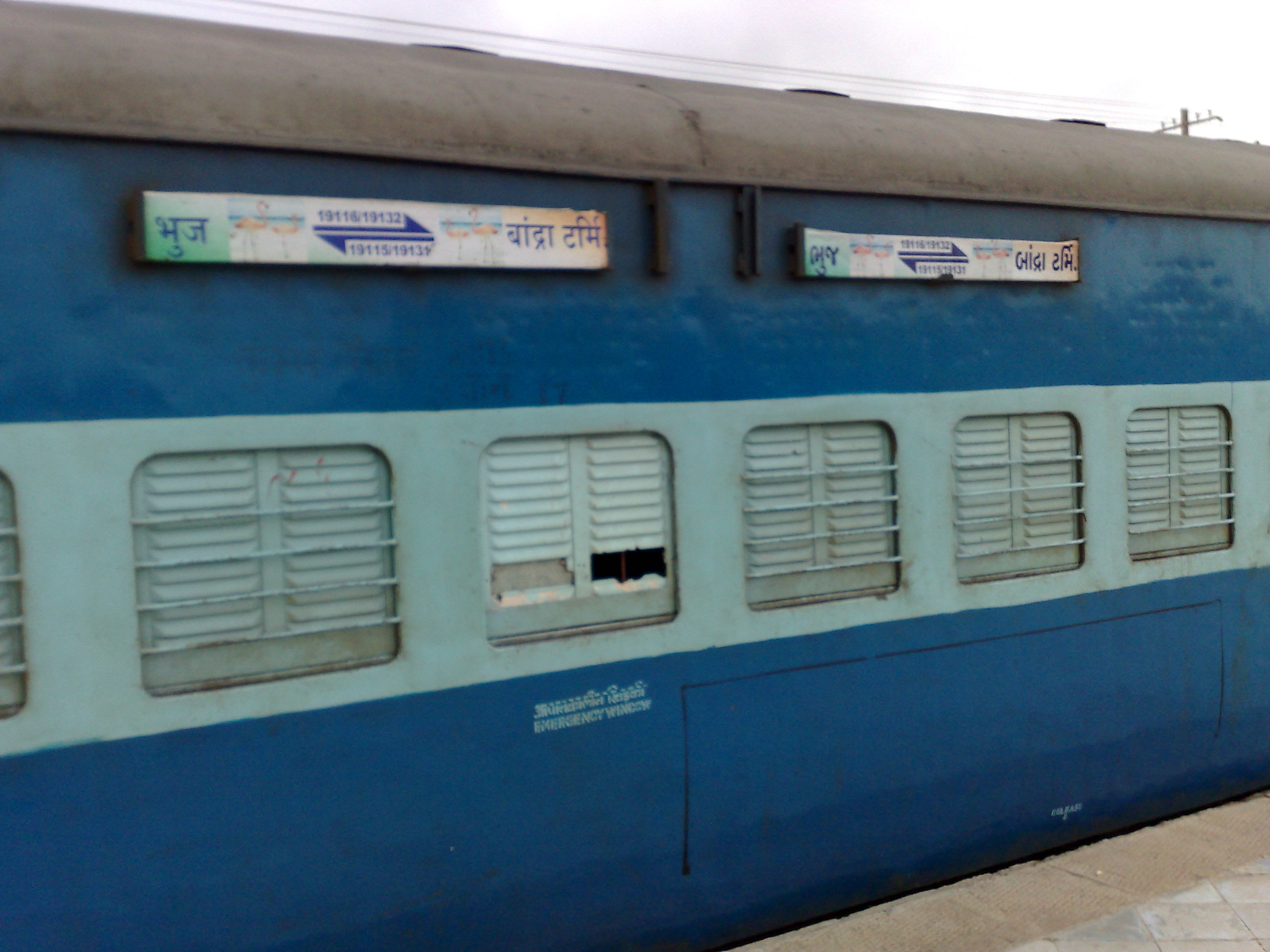
20908 Sayajinagri Express sleeper coach

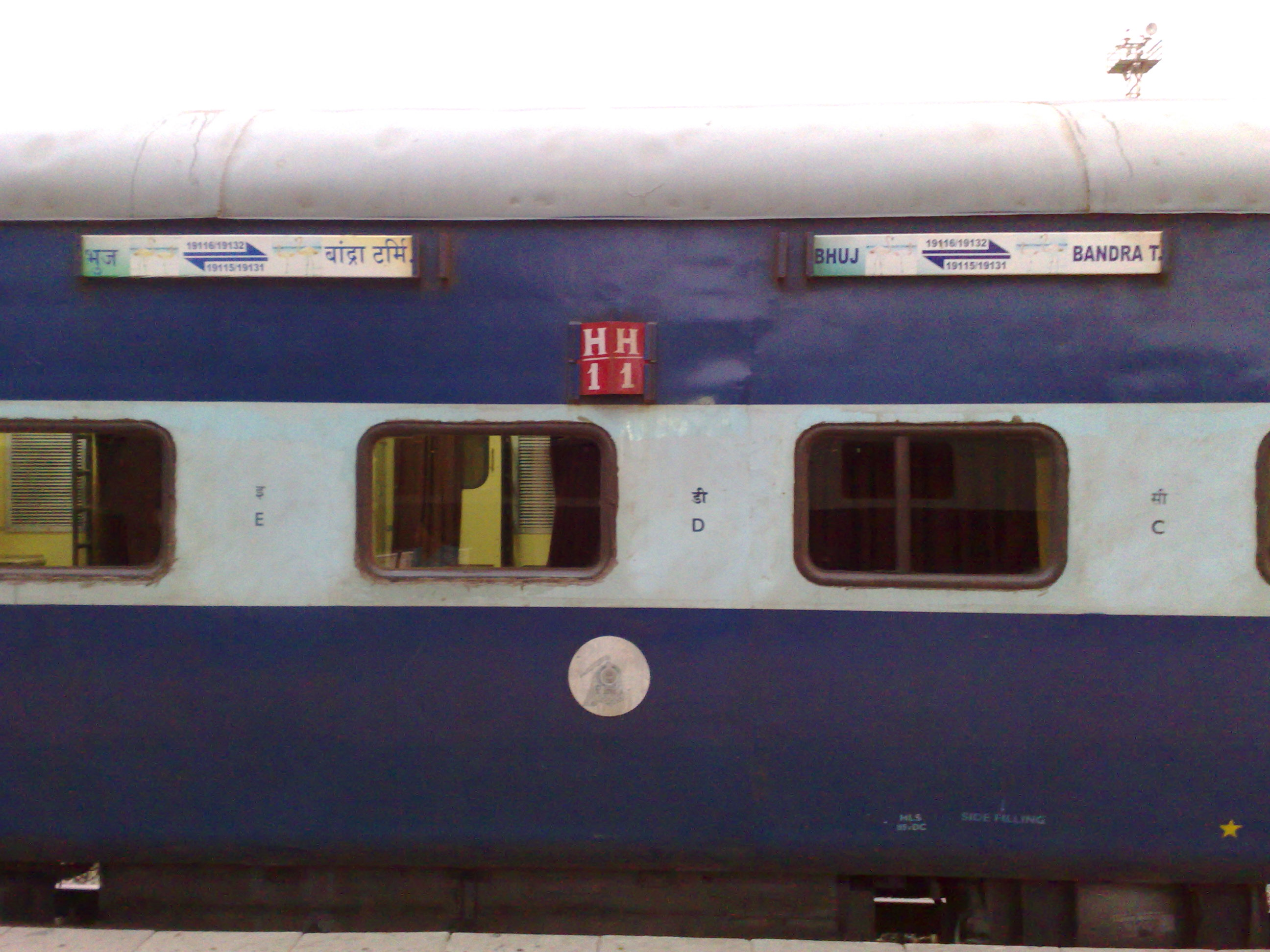
20908 Sayajinagri Express – AC 1st class coach

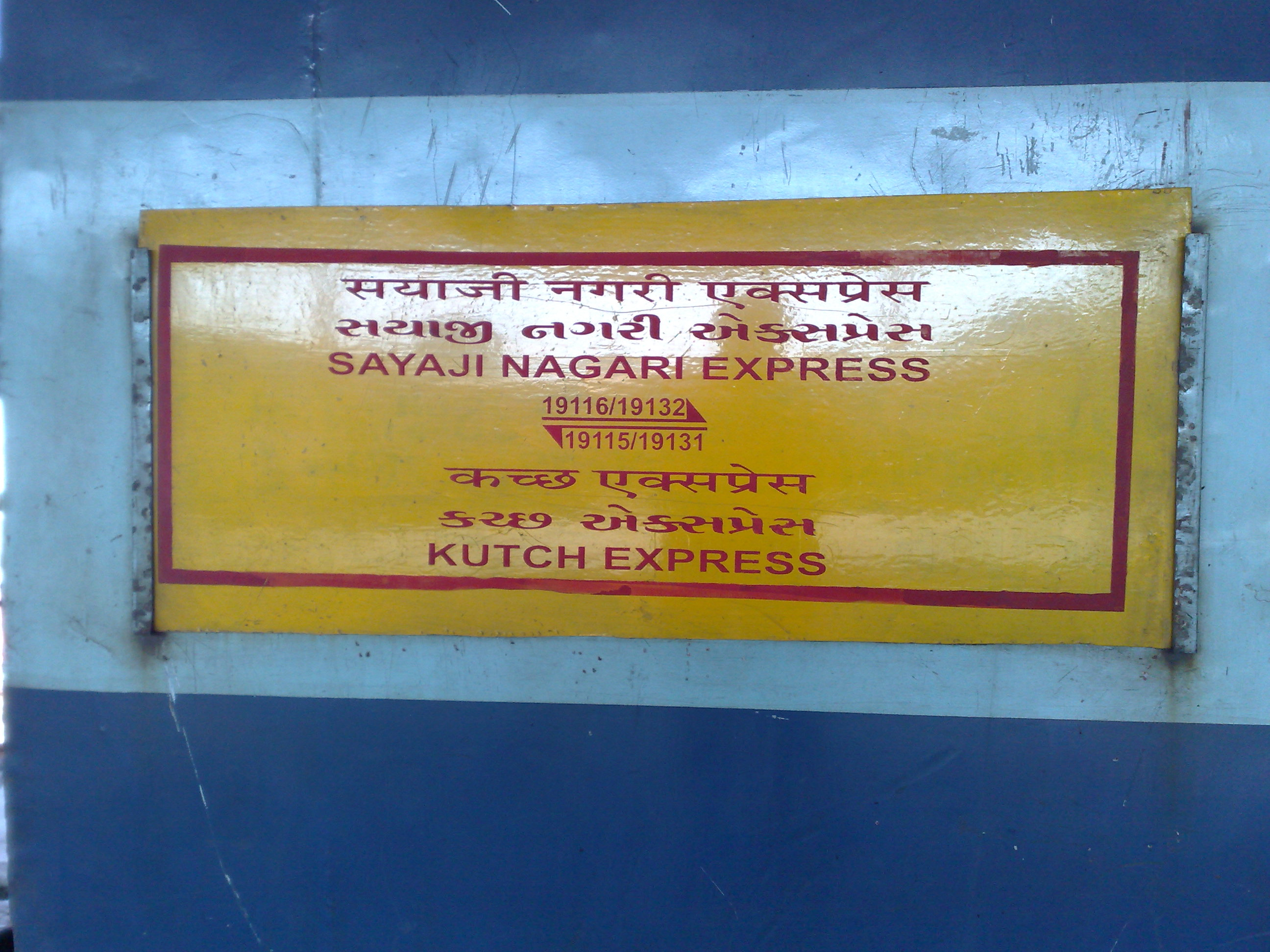
New RSA board of the Kutch & Sayajinagari Express
