= Garba Superfast Express =

Train in India

Overview
- Service type: Express
- Locale: Gujarat, Rajasthan, Madhya Pradesh, Uttar Pradesh, Bihar, Jharkhand & West Bengal
- First service: 20 March 2010; 16 years ago
- Current operator: Western Railways

Route
- Termini: Gandhidham (GIMB); Howrah (HWH)
- Stops: 16
- Distance travelled: 2,526 km (1,570 mi)
- Average journey time: 42 hours 30 mins
- Service frequency: Weekly
- Train number: 12937 / 12938

On-board services
- Classes: AC 2 Tier, AC 3 Tier, Sleeper class, General Unreserved
- Seating arrangements: Yes
- Sleeping arrangements: Yes
- Catering facilities: E-catering, On-board catering
- Observation facilities: Large windows
- Other facilities: Below the seats

Technical
- Rolling stock: LHB coach
- Track gauge: 1,676 mm (5 ft 6 in)
- Operating speed: 60 km/h (37 mph) average with halts
Route map
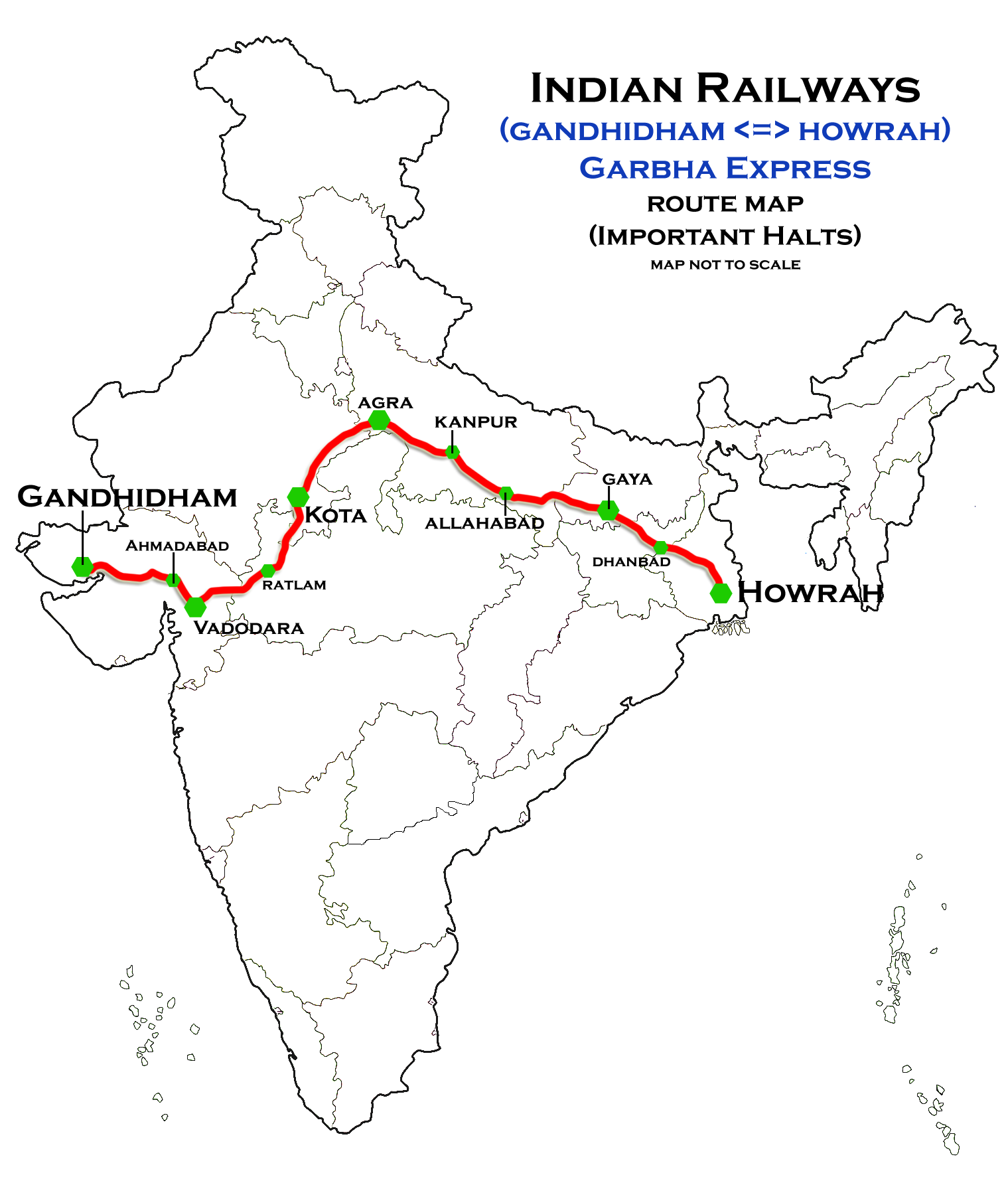

The 12937 / 12938 Garba Superfast Express is an express train belonging to Western Railway zone that runs between Gandhidham Junction and Howrah in India. It is currently being operated with 12937/12938 train numbers on a weekly basis.

== Coaches ==
The train has standard LHB rakes with max speed of 130 kmph. The train consists of 22 coaches:

- 1 AC II Tier
- 5 AC III Tier
- 8 Sleeper coaches
- 6 General Unreserved
- 2 EOG cum Luggage Rake

As with most train services in India, coach composition may be amended at the discretion of Indian Railways depending on demand.

Loco	1	2	3	4	5	6	7	8	9	10	11	12	13	14	15	16	17	18	19	20	21	22	23
	EOG	UR	UR	UR	S8	S7	S6	S5	S4	S3	S2	S1	B6	B5	B4	B3	B2	B1	A1	UR	UR	UR	EOG

== Service ==
- 12937/Gandhidham–Howrah Garbha Express has an average speed of 58 km/h and covers 2525 km in 43 hrs 30 mins.
- 12938/Howrah–Gandhidham Garbha Express has an average speed of 61 km/h and covers 2525 km in 41 hrs 30 mins.

== Route and halts ==
The important halts of the train are:

- Gandhidham Junction
- Samakhiali Junction
- Dhrangadhra Junction
- Ahmedabad Junction
- Chhayapuri (Vadodara)
- Ratlam Junction
- Kota Junction
- Agra Fort
- Tundla
- Kanpur Central
- Prayagraj Junction
- Pt. Deen Dayal Upadhyaya Jn.
- Sasaram
- Gaya Junction
- Koderma Junction
- Dhanbad Junction
- Asansol
- Howrah

== Schedule ==
Train number	Station code	Departure station	Departure time	Departure day	Arrival station	Arrival time	Arrival day
12937	GIMB	Gandhidham Junction	17:40 PM	Sat	Howrah Junction	13:10 PM	Mon
12938	HWH	Howrah Junction	23:00 PM	Mon	Gandhidham Junction	16:30 PM	Wed

== Rake sharing ==
The train shares its rake with 22951/22952 Bandra Terminus–Gandhidham Weekly Superfast Express.

== Traction ==
It is hauled by a Vadodara Loco Shed based WAP-7 electric locomotive on its entire journey.
