= Kamakhya–Gandhidham Express =

Train in India

Gandhidham–Kamakhya Express
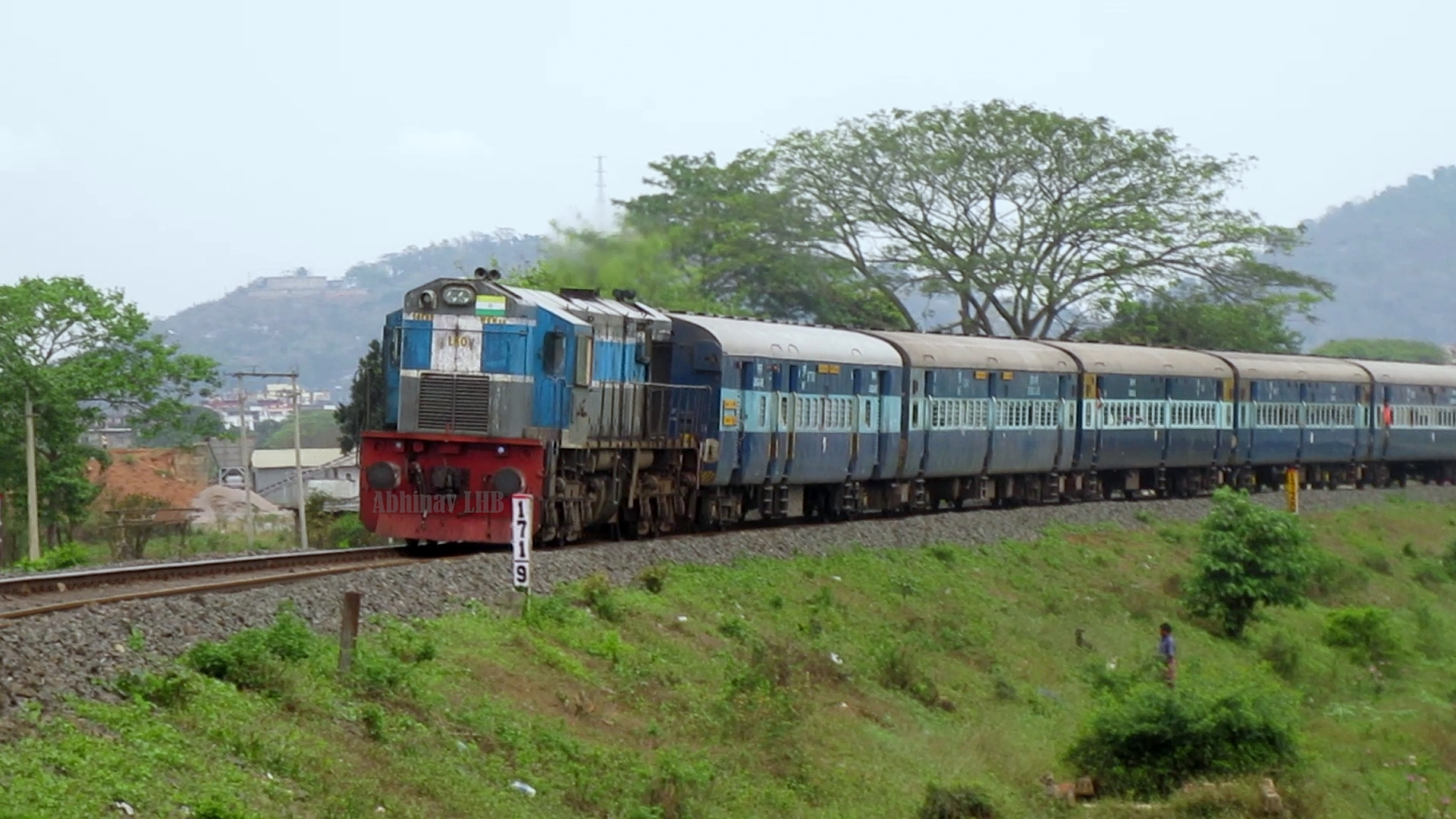
- LKO WDM3B with 15668 Kamakhya–Gandhidham Express

Overview
- Service type: Express
- First service: 28 February 2009; 17 years ago
- Current operator: Northeast Frontier Railway

Route
- Termini: Gandhidham Junction (GIMB); Kamakhya Junction (KYQ)
- Stops: 34
- Distance travelled: 3,117 km (1,937 mi)
- Average journey time: 63 hours 15 mins
- Service frequency: Weekly
- Train number: 15667/15668

On-board services
- Classes: AC 3 tier, AC 2 tier, Sleeper class, General Unreserved
- Seating arrangements: Yes
- Sleeping arrangements: Yes
- Catering facilities: Pantry car E-catering; On-board catering
- Observation facilities: LHB coach
- Entertainment facilities: No
- Baggage facilities: Available

Technical
- Rolling stock: 2
- Track gauge: 1,676 mm (5 ft 6 in)
- Operating speed: 49 km/h (30 mph)
Route map
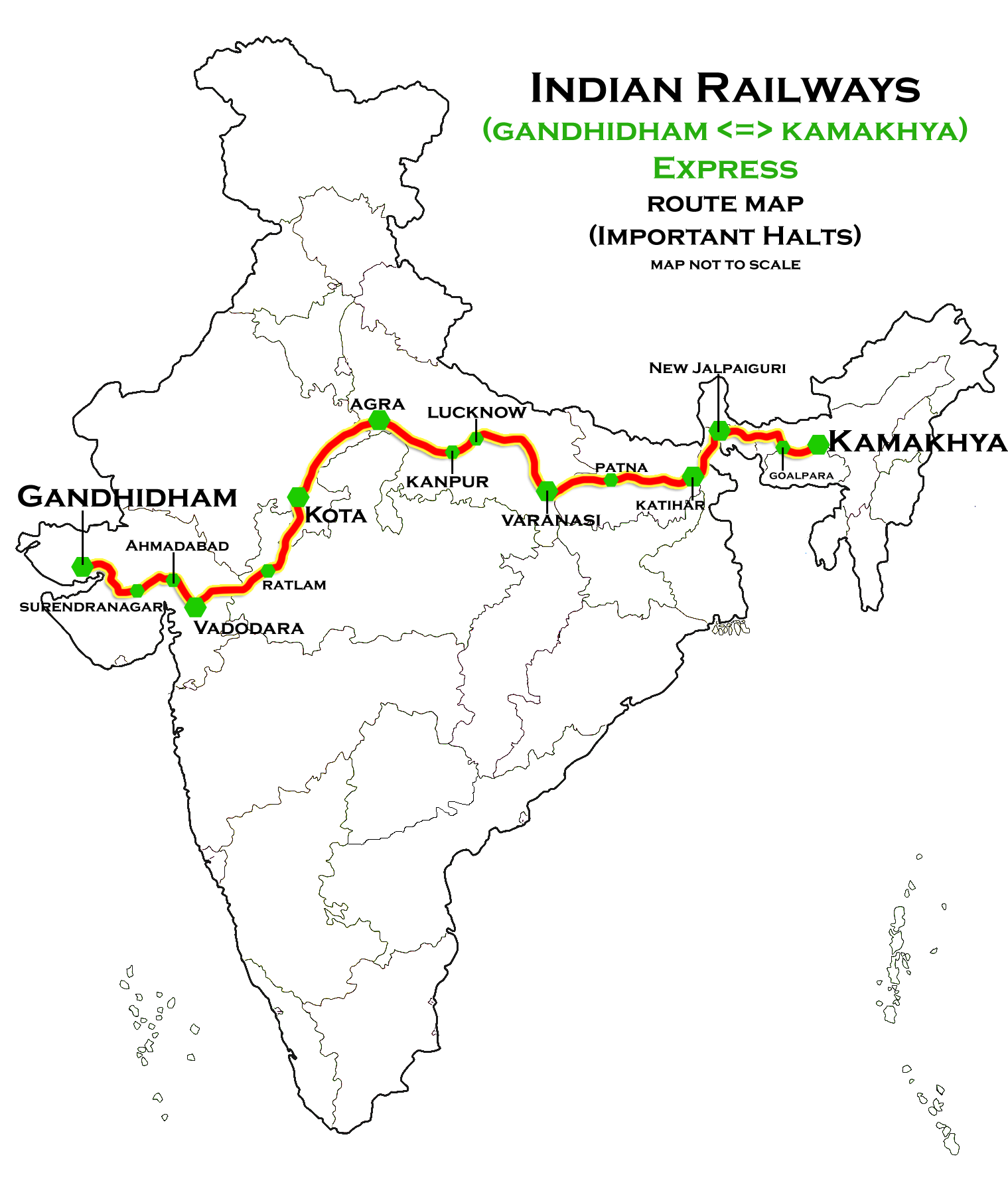

The 15667/15668 Gandhidham–Kamakhya Express is an Express train of the Indian Railways connecting Gandhidham Junction in Gujarat and Kamakhya Junction in Assam. It is currently operated with 15667/15668 train numbers on a weekly basis.

== Service ==
- The 15667/Gandhidham–Kamakhya Express has an average speed of 48 km/h and covers 3118 km in 64 hrs 30 mins.
- The 15668/Kamakhya–Gandhidham Express has an average speed of 49 km/h and covers 3118 km in 63 hrs 40 mins.

== Route and halts ==
The important halts of the train are:

GUJARAT

1. Gandhidham Junction (Starts)
2. Bhachau
3. Samakhiali Junction
4. Morbi
5. Wankaner Junction
6. Surendranagar Junction
7. Viramgam Junction
8. Ahmedabad Junction
9. Chhayapuri (Vadodara)
10. Dahod

MADHYA PRADESH

1. Ratlam Junction

RAJASTHAN

1. Kota Junction
2. Sawai Madhopur Junction

UTTAR PRADESH

1. Agra Fort
2. Tundla Junction
3. Kanpur Central
4. Lucknow Charbagh
5. Ayodhya cantt Junction
6. Varanasi Junction
7. Pt. Deen Dayal Upadhyaya Junction

BIHAR

1. Patna Junction
2. Barauni Junction
3. Katihar Junction

WEST BENGAL

1. New Jalpaiguri (Siliguri)
2. New Cooch Behar
3. New Alipurduar

ASSAM

1. Kokrajhar
2. New Bongaigaon Junction
3. Goalpara
4. Kamakhya Junction (Ends)

== Coach composition ==
The train consists of 21 coaches:

- 1 AC II Tier
- 4 AC III Tier
- 10 Sleeper coaches
- 3 General Unreserved
- 2 End-on generator
- 1 Pantry car

Train bypass vadodara jnuction stops at chayapuri,13km from vadodara junction

== Traction ==
As the route is yet to be fully electrified, it is hauled by a Sabarmati Diesel Loco Shed-based WAP7 from Gandhidham, NEW COOCH BAHAR |Vadodara Electric Loco Shed]]-based WAP-7 locomotive which takes the train to upto New Cooch Behar where Siliguri Diesel Loco Shed-based WDP-4D completes the remainder of the journey to Kamakhya Junction.

== See also ==
- Dwarka Express
- Sabarmati Express
