= Visakhapatnam–Gandhidham Express =

Train in India

Visakhapatnam-Gandhidham Superfast Express
Overview
- Service type: Superfast
- Locale: Andhra Pradesh, Maharastra, Gujarat
- First service: 24 December 2013; 12 years ago
- Current operator: South Coast Railway

Route
- Termini: Visakhapatnam (VSKP); Gandhidham (GIMB)
- Stops: 27
- Distance travelled: 2,112 km (1,312 mi)
- Average journey time: 36 hours 40 minutes
- Service frequency: Weekly
- Train number: 20803 / 20804

On-board services
- Classes: AC 2 Tier, AC 3 Tier, Sleeper Class, General Unreserved
- Disabled access: Disabled access
- Seating arrangements: Yes
- Sleeping arrangements: Yes
- Catering facilities: Available
- Observation facilities: Large Windows
- Baggage facilities: No
- Other facilities: Below the seats

Technical
- Rolling stock: LHB coach
- Track gauge: 1,676 mm (5 ft 6 in)
- Operating speed: 130 km/h (81 mph) maximum, 58 km/h (36 mph) average including halts.
Route map
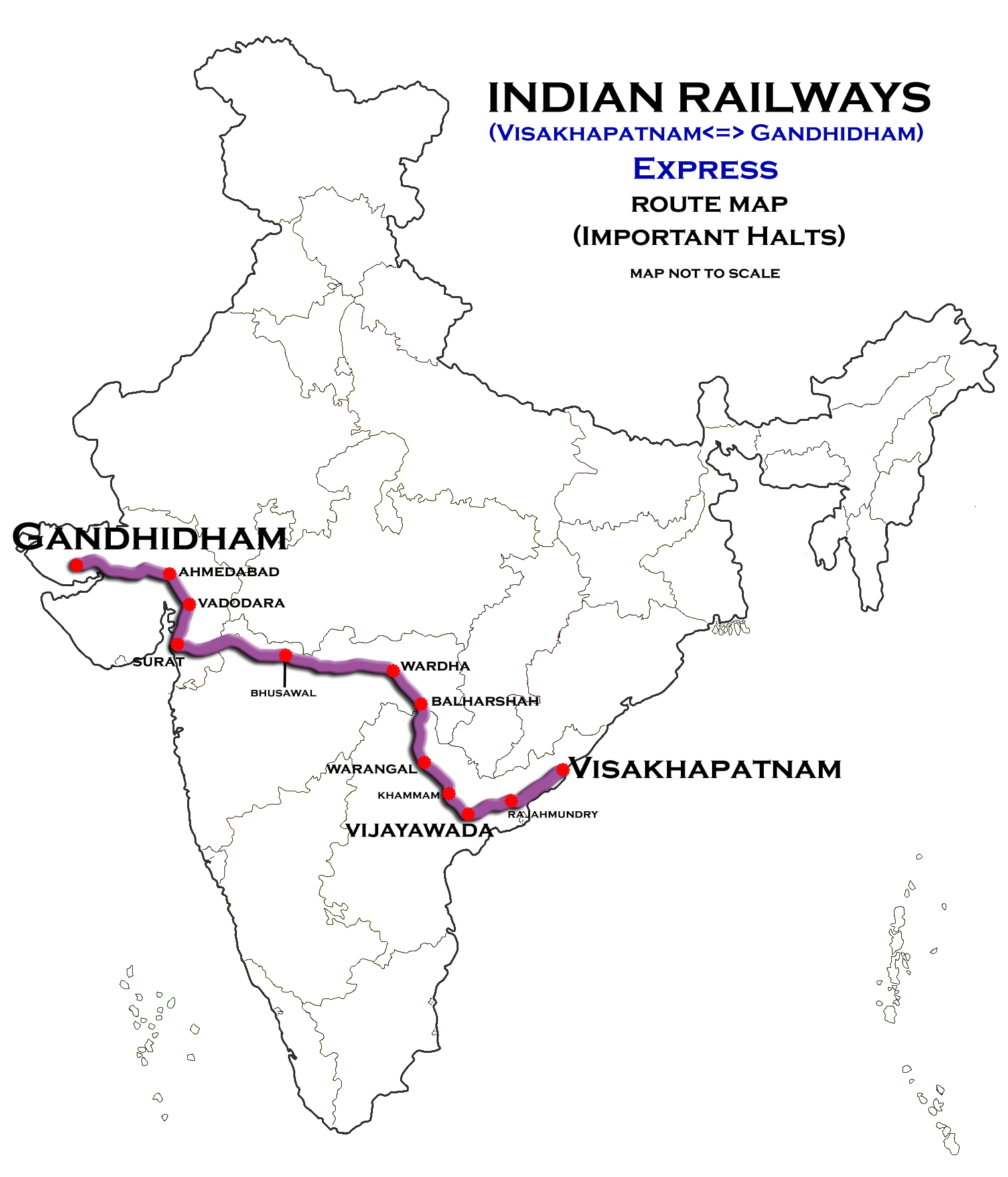

The 20803 / 20804 Visakhapatnam–Gandhidham Superfast Express is an Express train belonging to Indian Railways that runs between Visakhapatnam Junction and Gandhidham Junction as a weekly service. It is maintained by South Coast Railway Zone.

== Special runs and inaugural ==
It operates as train number 20803 from Visakhapatnam to Gandhidham and as train number 20804. It first ran as holiday special on 19, 26 December 2013. Later it was inaugurated on 24 December by Union minister of state for commerce and industry, D.Purandeswari with train number as 08503 from Visakhapatnam and from Gandhidham as 08504 inaugural special. Its regular run commenced on 2 January 2014 with train numbers 18501/18502.

== Coach composition ==
The train has standard LHB rakes with max speed of 110 kmph. The train consists of 23 coaches :

- 1 AC I Tier
- 3 AC II Tier
- 6 AC III Tier
- 6 Sleeper Coaches
- 2 General Unreserved
- 1 Luggage Rake
- 1 Pantry Car

Loco	1	2	3	4	5	6	7	8	9	10	11	12	13	14	15	16	17	18	19	20	21	22	23
	SLR	UR	UR	UR	A1	B3	B2	B1	S10	S9	PC	S8	S7	S6	S5	S4	S3	S2	S1	UR	UR	UR	SLR

== Service ==
The 20803/Visakhapatnam - Gandhidham Express has an average speed of 54 km/h and covers 2112 km in 39 hrs 25 mins.

The 20804/Gandhidham - Visakhapatnam Express has an average speed of 53 km/h and covers 2112 km in 39 hrs 50 mins.

== Route and halts ==
The halts of the train are:

- Visakhapatnam Junction
- Duvvada
- Samalkot Junction
- Rajahmundry
- Eluru
- Vijayawada Junction
- Khammam
- Warangal
- Ramagundam
- Sirpur Kaghaznagar
- Balharshah Junction
- Chandrapur
- Wardha Junction
- Badnera Junction
- Akola Junction
- Malkapur
- Bhusaval Junction
- Jalgaon Junction
- Nandurbar
- Surat
- Ankleshwar Junction
- Vadodara Junction
- Anand Junction
- Ahmedabad Junction
- Viramgam Junction
- Dhrangadhra Junction
- Samakhiali Junction
- Bhachau
- Gandhidham Junction

== Schedule ==
Train Number	Station Code	Departure Station	Departure Time	Departure Day	Arrival Station	Arrival Time	Arrival Day
20803	VSKP	Visakhapatnam Junction	17:35 PM	Thu	Gandhidham Junction	06:15 AM	Sat
20804	GIMB	Gandhidham Junction	23:05 PM	Sun	Visakhapatnam Junction	10:10 AM	Tue

== Direction reversal ==
Train reverses its direction one time at:

- Vijayawada Junction

== Traction ==
It is hauled by a Lallaguda Loco Shed-based WAP-7 electric locomotive from Visakhapatnam to Gandhidham and vice-versa .
