= Gandhidham–Bhuj section =

Railway line in India

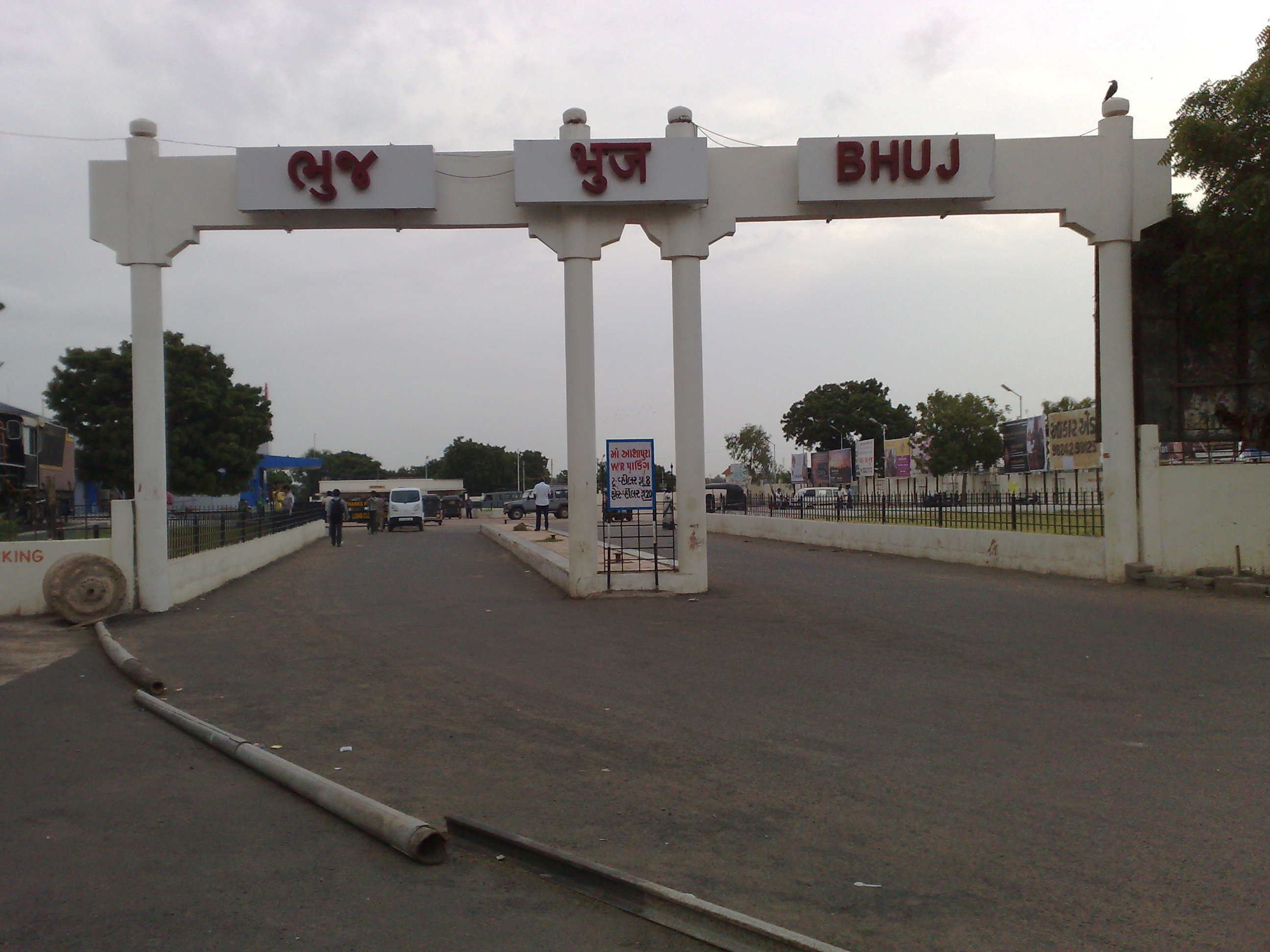
- Bhuj railway station the last station on Gandhidham–Bhuj section

Overview
- Status: Operational
- Owner: Indian Railways
- Locale: Gujarat
- Termini: Gandhidham; Bhuj

Service
- Operator: Western Railway

History
- Opened: 1908; 118 years ago

Technical
- Track length: 59 km (37 mi)
- Number of tracks: 1
- Track gauge: 5 ft 6 in (1,676 mm) broad gauge
- Electrification: Yes

The Gandhidham–Bhuj section belongs to Western Railway of Kutch district in Gujarat state. It passes through Adipur and Anjar

== History ==
Initially Gandhidham–Bhuj section was a meter gauge and later it was converted to broad gauge. The railway ran north from the port of Tuna towards Anjar in the Kutch. The railway was financed by the Maharao Khengarji Bawa of Cutch, and the initial section to Anjar was opened in 1905. An extension from Anjar to the state capital of Bhuj was later made and lines opened in 1908.

== Railway reorganization ==
Cutch State Railway was merged into the Western Railway on 5 November 1951, at which Gandhidham–Bhuj section was metre gauge. After the gauge conversion, Gandhidham–Bhuj section on 1 June 2001. Some of the trains were extended to Bhuj.

== Route ==
Gandhidham–Bhuj section connects Adipur, Mundra Port, and New Bhuj. Mundra Port link separates at Adipur.

== Speed limits ==
The Gandhidham–Bhuj Section is classified as a Group E-special class line in which speed should be below 100 km/h.
