= Gandhidham–Nagercoil Express =

Train in India

Gandhidham-Nagercoil Weekly Express
Overview
- Service type: Express
- First service: 1 July 1992; 34 years ago
- Current operator: Southern Railway

Route
- Termini: Gandhidham Junction (GIMB); Nagercoil Junction (NCJ)
- Stops: 55
- Distance travelled: 2,341 km (1,455 mi)
- Average journey time: 47 hours 25 mins
- Service frequency: Weekly
- Train number: 16335 / 16336

On-board services
- Classes: AC 2 tier, AC 3 tier, Sleeper Class, General Unreserved
- Seating arrangements: Yes
- Sleeping arrangements: Yes
- Catering facilities: Available
- Observation facilities: Large windows
- Baggage facilities: Available
- Other facilities: Below the seats

Technical
- Rolling stock: LHB coach
- Track gauge: 1,676 mm (5 ft 6 in)
- Electrification: yes
- Operating speed: 49 km/h (30 mph) average including halts.
Route map
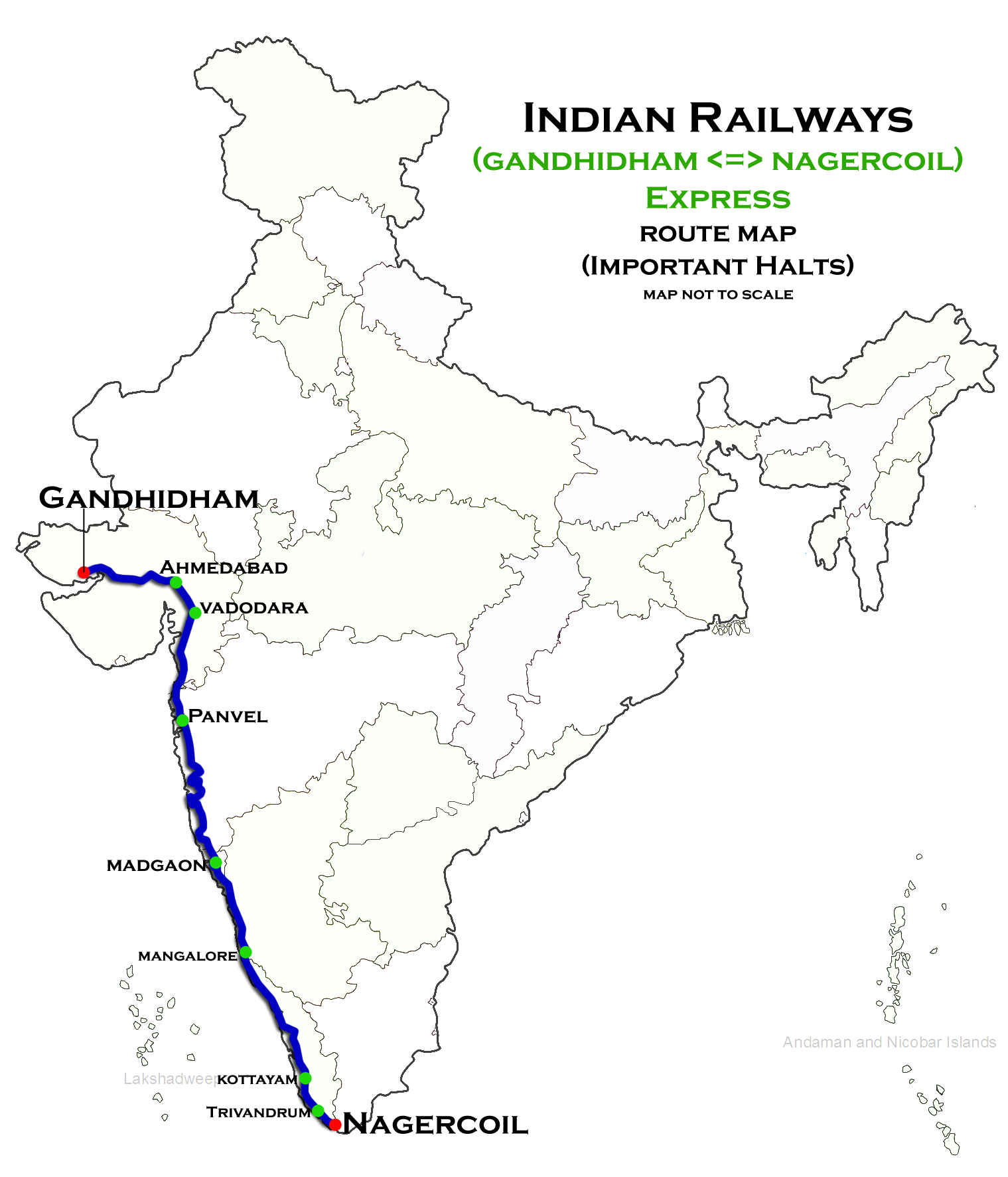

The 16335 / 16336 Gandhidham-Nagercoil Weekly Express is an express train belonging to Southern Railway zone that runs between Gandhidham Junction and Nagercoil Junction in India. It runs through Konkan Railway route of west coast of India. It runs only in Friday from Gandhidham Junction to Nagercoil Junction & it runs Tuesday from Nagercoil Junction to Gandhidham Junction in India.

It operates as train number 16335 from Gandhidham Junction to Nagercoil and as train number 16336 in the reverse direction serving the states of Gujarat, Maharashtra, Goa, Karnataka, Kerala & Tamil Nadu.

== Coach composition ==
before LHB coach upgrade the train runs on ICF coach. And now The train has standard LHB rakes with max speed of 140 kmph. The train consists of 24 coaches:

- 2 AC II Tier
- 4 AC III Tier
- 2 AC III Tier Economy
- 9 Sleeper Tier
- 1 Pantry Car
- 4 General Unreserved
- 1 Seating cum Luggage Car
- 1 Generator Car

Loco	1	2	3	4	5	6	7	8	9	10	11	12	13	14	15	16	17	18	19	20	21	22	23	24
	EOG	UR	UR	S1	S2	S3	S4	S5	S6	S7	S8	S9	PC	M2	M1	B4	B3	B2	B1	A2	A1	UR	UR	SLR

(Coach position of 16335 Gandhidham Nagercoil Express)

No rake sharing. One Dedicated LHB rakeset

As is customary with most train services in India, coach composition may be amended at the discretion of Indian Railways depending on demand.

== Service ==
The 16335/Gandhidham - Nagercoil Express covers the distance of 2,341 km (1,455 mi) in 45 hours 40 mins (51 km/h).

The 16336/Nagercoil - Gandhidham Express covers the distance of 2,341 km (1,455 mi) in 46 hours 15 mins (51 km/h).

As the average speed of the train is lower than 55 km/h (34 mph), as per railway rules, its fare doesn't includes a Superfast surcharge.

== Routing ==
The 16335 / 36 Gandhidham - Nagercoil Express runs from Gandhidham Junction via Ahmedabad Junction, Vasai Road, Panvel, Ratnagiri, Madgaon Junction,Udupi, Surathkal, Mangalore Junction, Ernakulam Town, Kottayam, Tiruvalla, Kollam Junction, Thiruvananthapuram Central to Nagercoil Junction and vice versa.

== Schedule ==
Train Number	Station Code	Departure Station	Departure Time	Departure Day	Arrival Station	Arrival Time	Arrival Day
16335	GIMB	Gandhidham Junction	10:35 AM	Fri	Nagercoil Junction	06:15 AM	Sun
16336	NCJ	Nagercoil Junction	14:45 PM	Tue	Gandhidham Junction	12:00 PM	Thu

== Traction ==
earlier the train was used with diesel loco link of WDP-4. As the route is fully electrified, it is hauled by an Erode Loco Shed based WAP-4 / WAP-7 electric locomotive on its entire journey.

== See also ==
- Netravati Express
- Ernakulam-Okha Express
