= Cutch State Railway =

Indian railway company

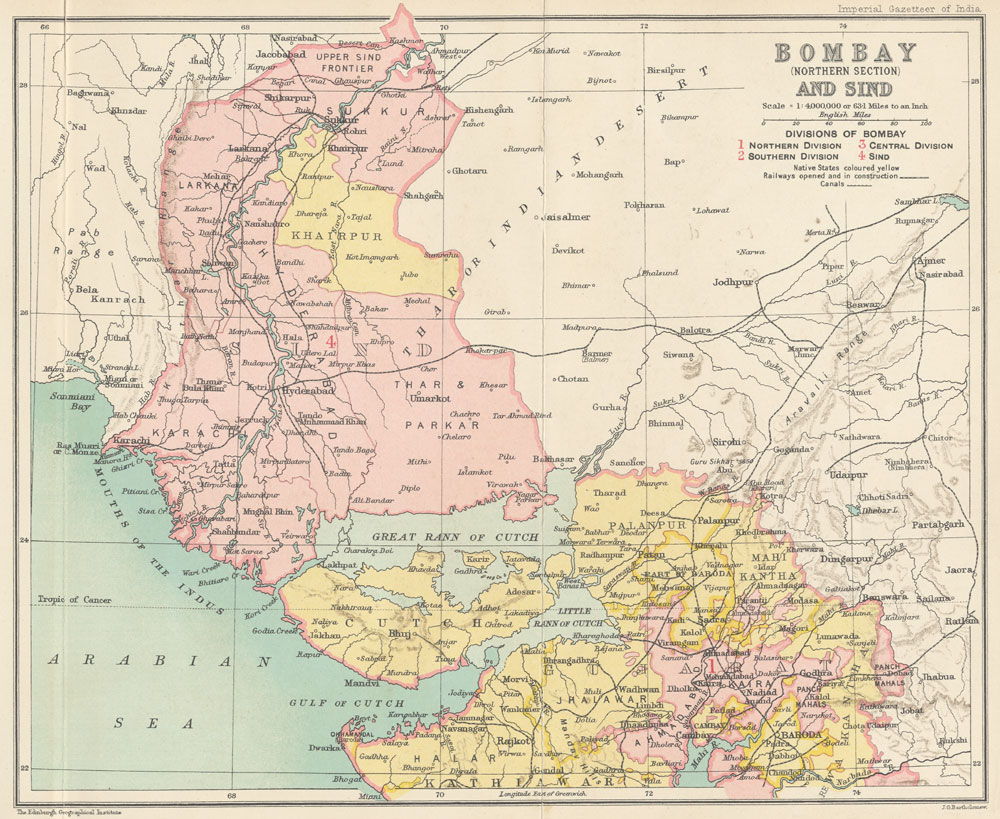
The 1909 map of Bombay Presidency shows Cutch State Railway line linking Bhuj to Tuna via Anjar. Other additions to Railway, made later, are obviously, not there.

Cutch State Railway (CSR) was an isolated 2 ft 6 in (762 mm) narrow gauge railway in Cutch State, one of the princely states allied to Britain in India.

== History ==
The railway was financed by the Maharao Khengarji Bawa of Cutch State. The laying of first rails started in 1900–01, from Tuna to Anjar, which became operational in 1905. The works for lines from Anjar to the then state capital Bhuj started in 1901-02 and completed in 1908. A further addition of 32 miles was done in 1912 from Varsamedi (near Anjar) to Bhachau and further extension of 15 miles up to Kandla port was started at the end of 1930 and completed in 1932. The narrow gauge lines of CSR were laid by hiring of British engineers and labor contractor works were mostly entrusted to Mistris of Kutch, who were skilled in Railway contract works. The railway was owned, managed and operated by Cutch State.

In 1940 the railway carried 300,000 passengers, while the main freight traffic was cotton, grain and sugar. The railway used four small 4-4-0 type locomotives, later supplemented by three 25 ton 4-6-0 locomotives. The Maharao owned a petrol railcar designed by Everard Calthrop, which the Maharao used as a shooting car on his hunting expeditions.

The Cutch State Railways continued to operate as separate system (even after independence of India and merger of the Princely State of Cutch) until the railway was merged into the Western Railway on 5 November 1951, at which time the total length was 72 miles.

== Rolling stock ==
In 1936, the company owned 6 locomotives, 7 railcars, 15 coaches and 66 goods wagons.

== Classification ==
It was labeled as a Class III railway according to Indian Railway Classification System of 1926.

== Conversion to broad gauge ==
The railway has been connected to Indian Railways and is under conversion to 1,676 mm (5 ft 6 in) broad gauge.
