= Bhuj railway station =

Railway station in Bhuj, Gujarat

Bhuj
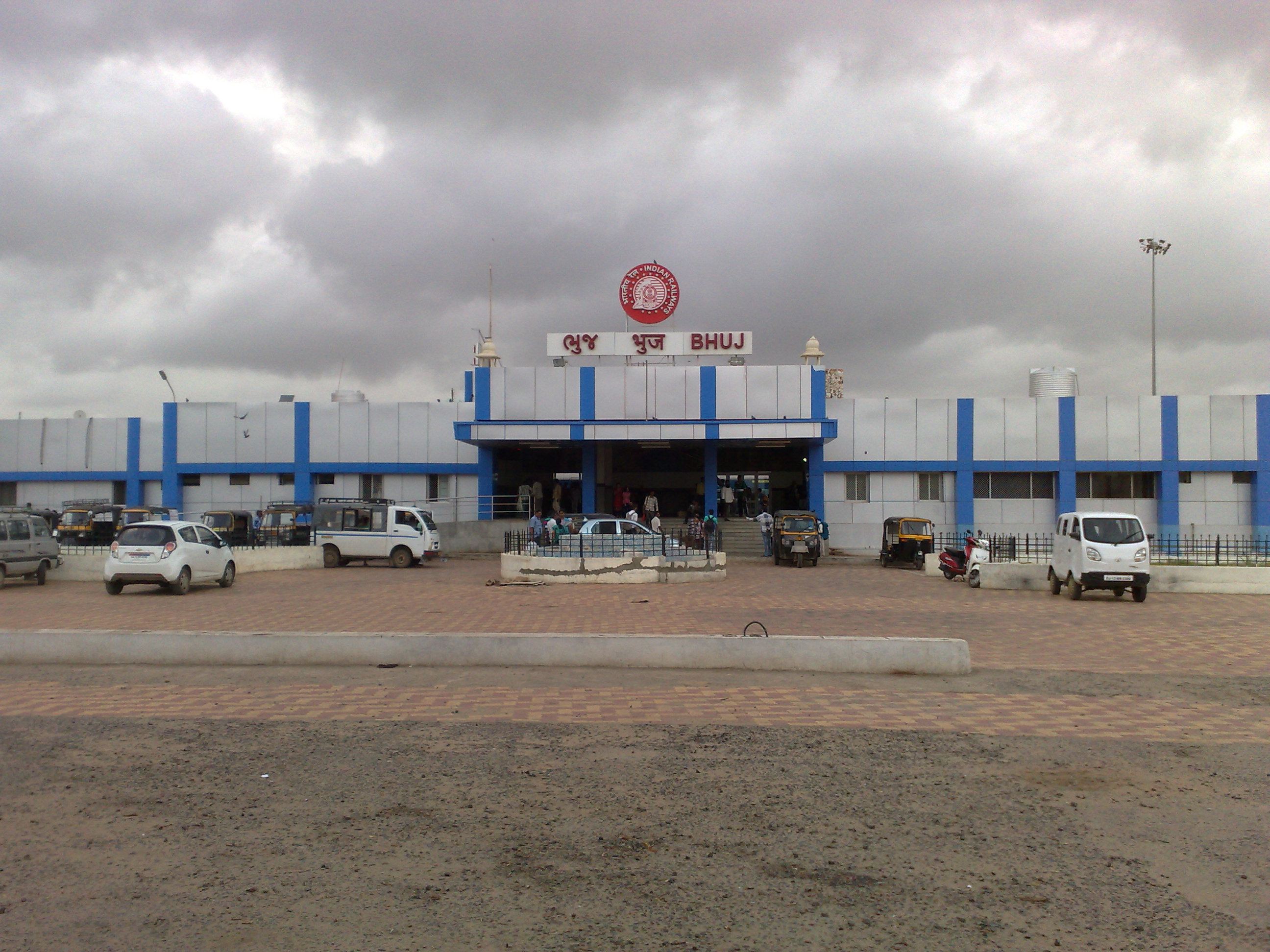
- Front view of Bhuj railway station

General information
- Location: Atmaram Marg, Bhuj, Gujarat; India
- Coordinates: 23°15′58″N 69°40′42″E
- Elevation: 85.00 metres (278.87 ft)
- System: Indian Railways station
- Owner: Indian Railways
- Operator: Western Railway
- Line: Gandhidham–Bhuj section
- Platforms: 3
- Tracks: 4

Construction
- Structure type: Standard (on ground)
- Parking: Yes
- Accessible: Disabled access

Other information
- Status: Functioning
- Station code: BHUJ
- Zone(s): Western Railway
- Division(s): Ahmedabad
Location
- Location within Gujarat Location within India

Bhuj railway station (station code:- BHUJ) is a Class-A railway station in Bhuj, Gujarat, India, on the Western line of the Western Railway network. It is the last station on the Western Railway line in the area. It handles nine trains.

== Major trains ==
The train which originates from Bhuj are :

● Bhuj–Pune Express (11091/11092)

● Dadar–Bhuj Superfast Express (12959/12960)

● Ala Hazrat Express (via Mahesana) (14311/14312)

● Ala Hazrat Express (via Bhildi) (14321/14322)

● Sayajinagari Express (20907/20908)

● Palanpur–Bhuj Intercity Express (20927/20928)

● Shalimar–Bhuj Weekly Superfast Express (22829/22830)

● Bhuj–Delhi Express (19403/19404)

● Kutch Express (22955/22956)
