= Kutch Express =

Train in India

Kutch Superfast Express
Overview
- Service type: Superfast
- Locale: Maharashtra & Gujarat
- First service: 2 October 1984; 41 years ago
- Current operator: Western Railway

Route
- Termini: Bandra Terminus (BDTS); Bhuj (BHUJ)
- Stops: 19
- Distance travelled: 840 km (522 mi)
- Average journey time: 14 hours 45 minutes
- Service frequency: Daily
- Train number: 22955 / 22956

On-board services
- Classes: AC First, AC 2 tier, AC 3 tier, Sleeper Class, General Unreserved
- Seating arrangements: Yes
- Sleeping arrangements: Yes
- Catering facilities: On-board catering, E-catering
- Observation facilities: Large windows
- Baggage facilities: Available
- Other facilities: Below the seats

Technical
- Rolling stock: LHB coach
- Track gauge: 1,676 mm (5 ft 6 in)
- Operating speed: 130 km/h (81 mph) maximum, 57 km/h (35 mph) average including halts
Route map
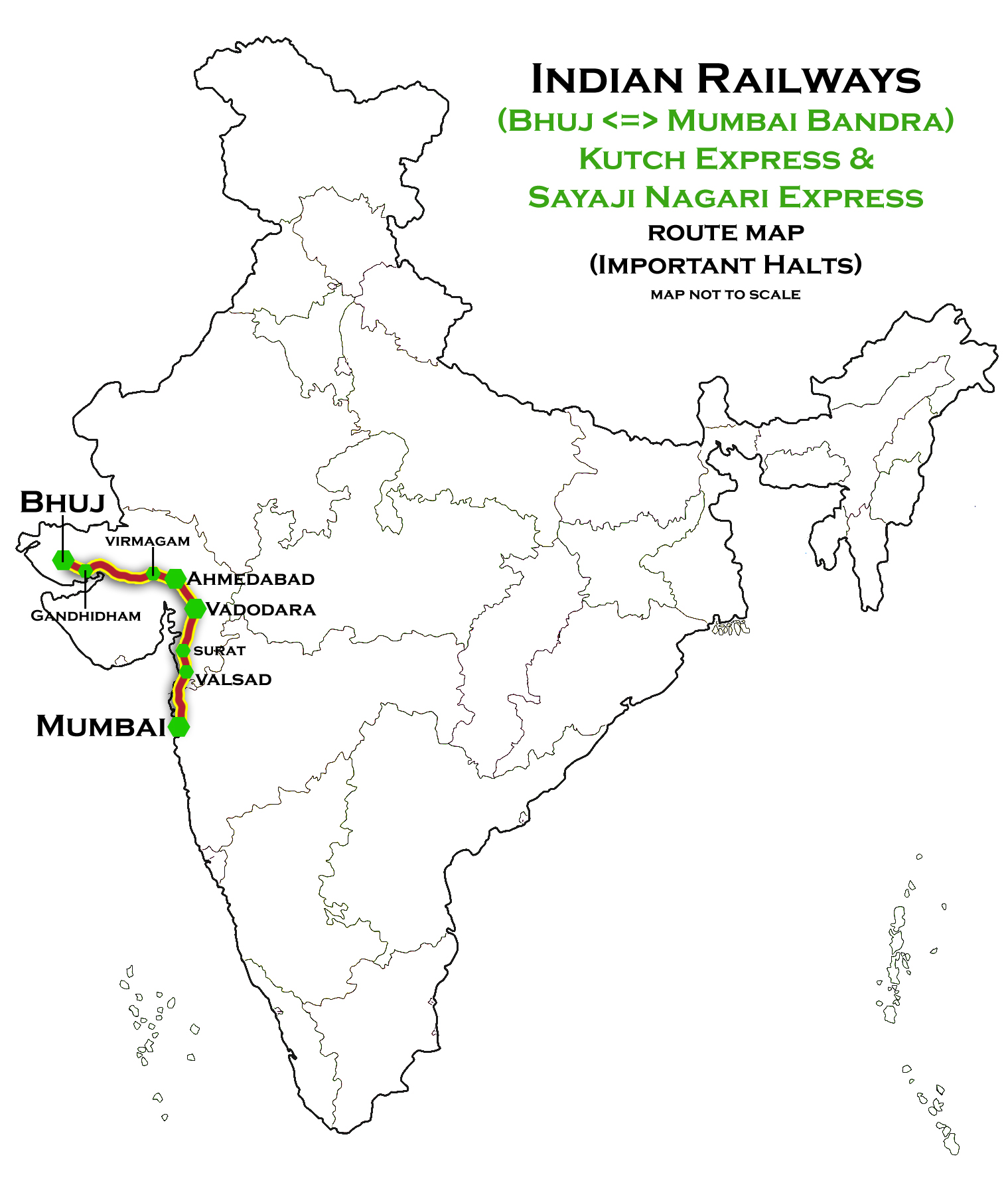

The 22955 / 22956 Kutch Superfast Express is a Superfast Express train belonging to Indian Railways that runs between Bandra Terminus and Bhuj. It is a daily service. It operates as train number 22955 from Bandra Terminus to Bhuj and as train number 22956 in the reverse direction.

Initially it ran to/from Mumbai Central later it was amended to Bandra Terminus.

== Coaches ==
22955/22956 Bandra Terminus–Bhuj Kutch Express has 1 AC 1st Class, 2 AC 2 tier, 6 AC 3 tier, 7 Sleeper Class & 4 Unreserved/General coaches.

As with most train services in India, coach composition may be amended at the discretion of Indian Railways depending on demand.

== Service ==
22955 Bandra Terminus–Bhuj Kutch Express covers the distance of 839 km in 15 hours 05 mins (55.48 km/h).

22956 Bhuj–Bandra Terminus Kutch Express covers the distance of 839 km in 15 hours 10 mins (55.19 km/h).

As the average speed of the train in both directions is above 55 km/h (34 mph), its fare includes a Superfast surcharge.

== Route and halts ==
The 22955/22956 Kutch Superfast Express runs from Bandra Terminus via Borivali, Palghar, Vapi, Valsad, Surat, Bharuch Junction, Vadodara Junction, Anand Junction, Ahmedabad Junction, Viramgam Junction, Samakhiali Junction, Gandhidham Junction, Adipur Junction to Bhuj.

== Traction ==
Both trains are hauled by a Vadodara Loco Shed based WAP-7 electric locomotive from Bandra Terminus to Bhuj and vice versa.

== Direction reversal ==
The train reverses its direction once at;

- Gandhidham Junction.

== Train history ==
- It was flagged off as 31DN/32UP Bombay Central–Gandhidham Express with 9 halts.
- It was extended to Bhuj railway station on 3 June 2001 after completion of the Gandhidham–Bhuj BG line.
- On 8 February 2008 this train was shifted to Bandra Terminus.
- It used to run as 9031/9032 BDTS–New Bhuj Kutch Express.
- It was further renumbered as 9131/9132 from 15 June 2008.
- It will be made a Superfast Train with new number 22955/22956 Kutch Superfast Express from Date 1 October 2016.

== Timetable ==
The 22955 Bandra Terminus–Bhuj Kutch Express leaves Bandra Terminus on a daily basis at 17:45 PM IST and reaches Bhuj at 08:50 AM IST the next day.

The 22956 Bhuj–Bandra Terminus Kutch Express leaves Bhuj on a daily basis at 20:15 PM IST and reaches Bandra Terminus at 11:25 AM IST the next day.

== Gallery ==
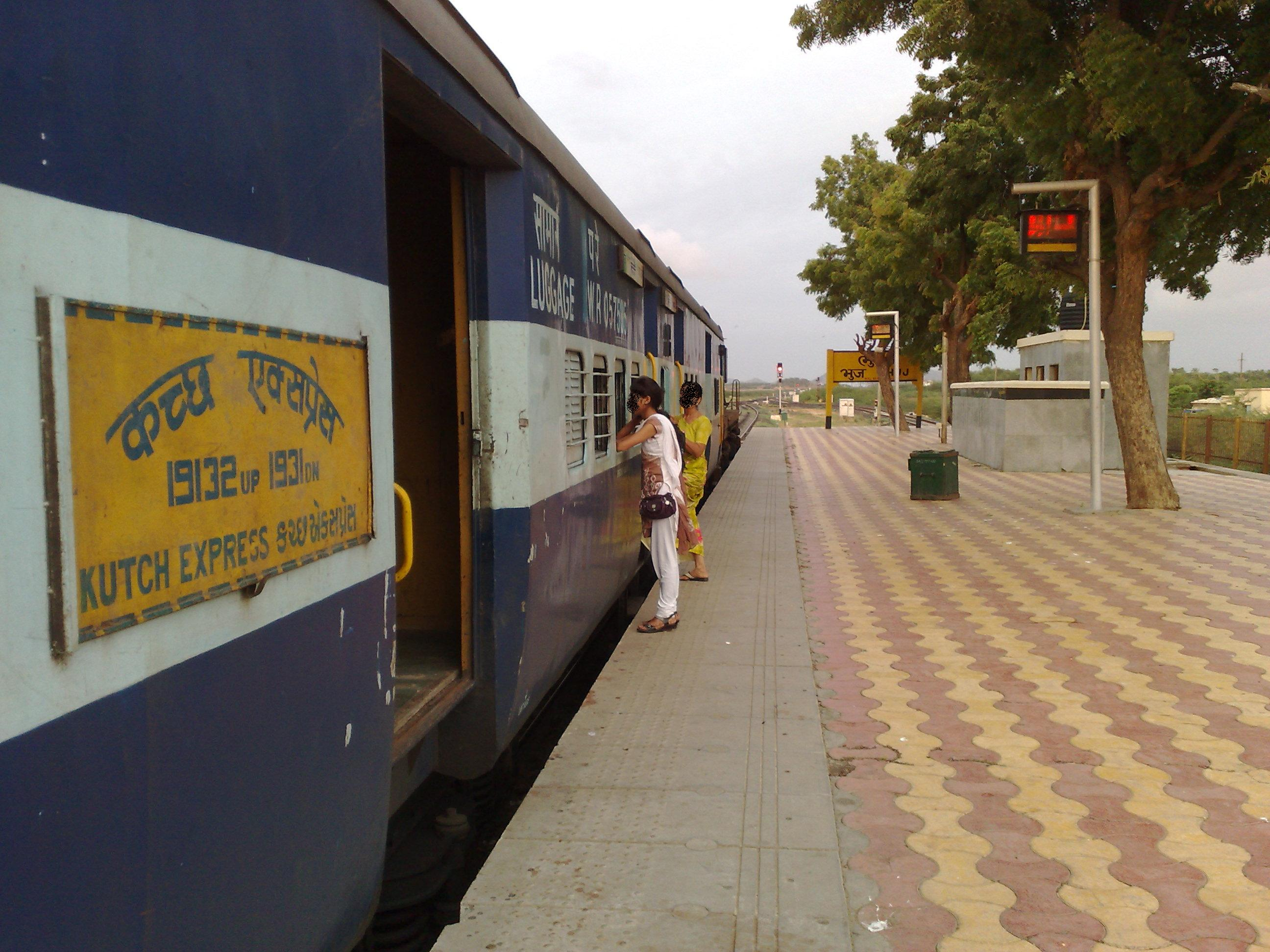
19132 Kutch Express at Bhuj railway station

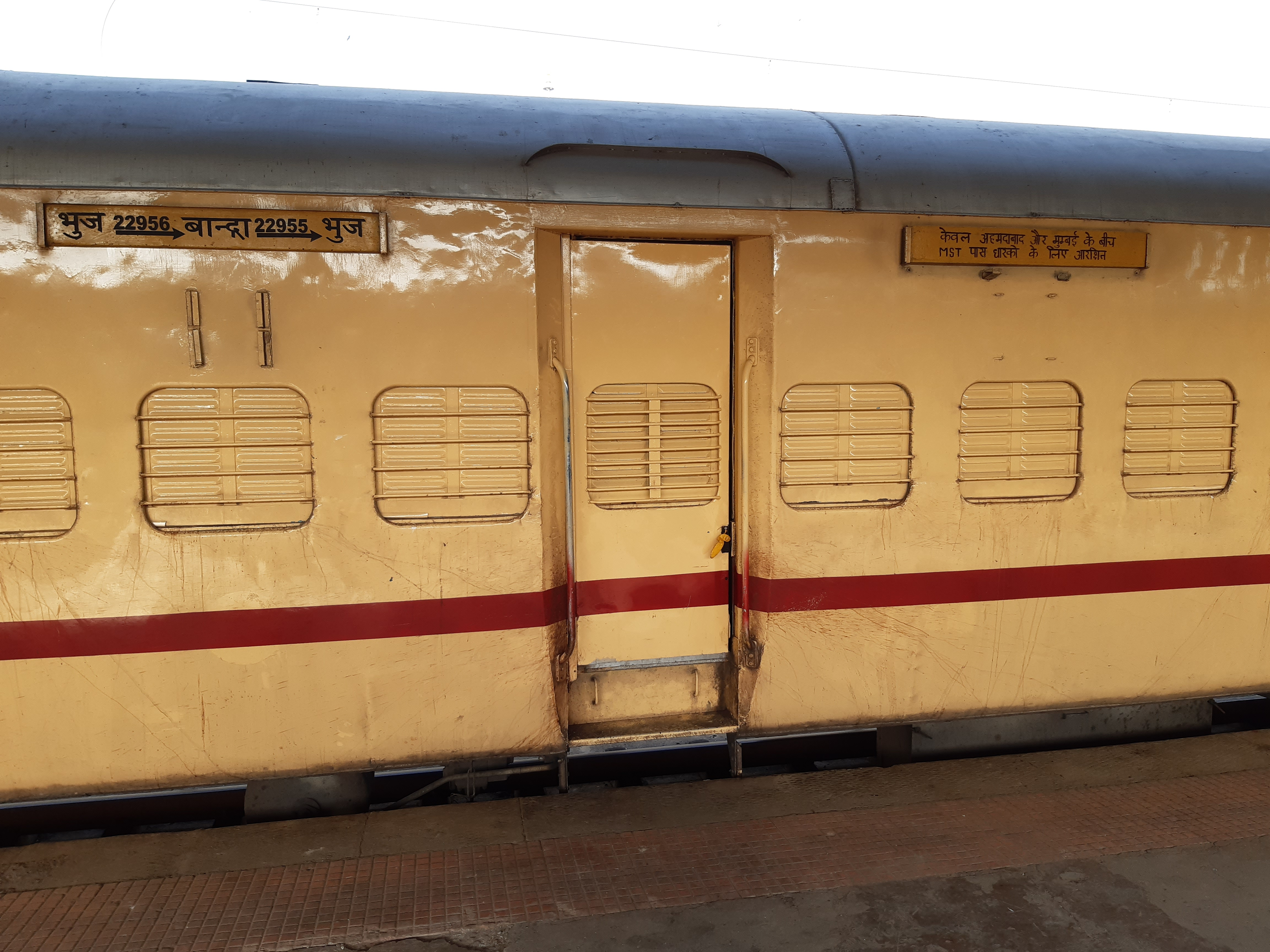
22955 Kutch Express – MST pass holder coach

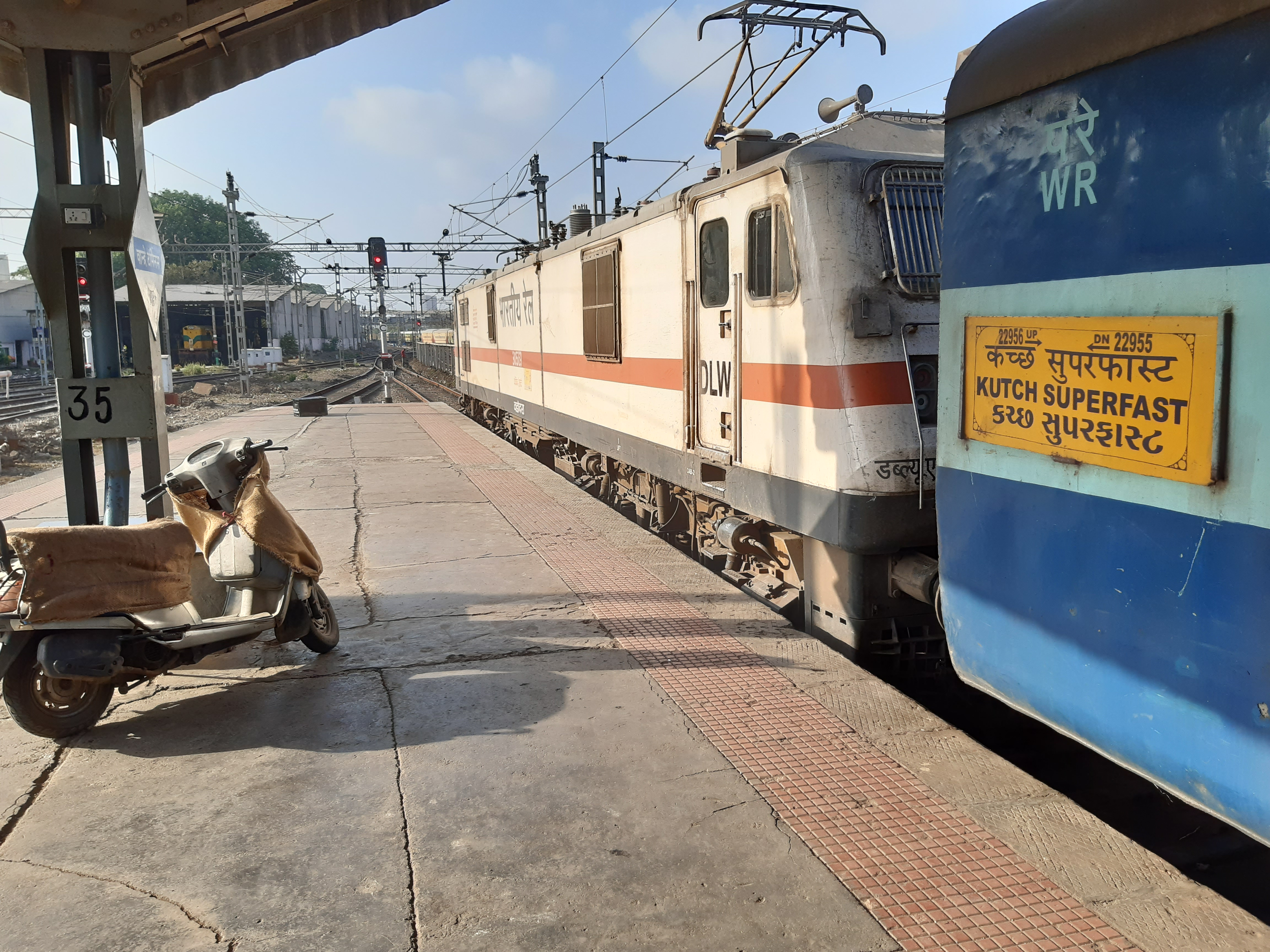
22955 Kutch Express with HOG-equipped Vadodara-based WAP-7 loco

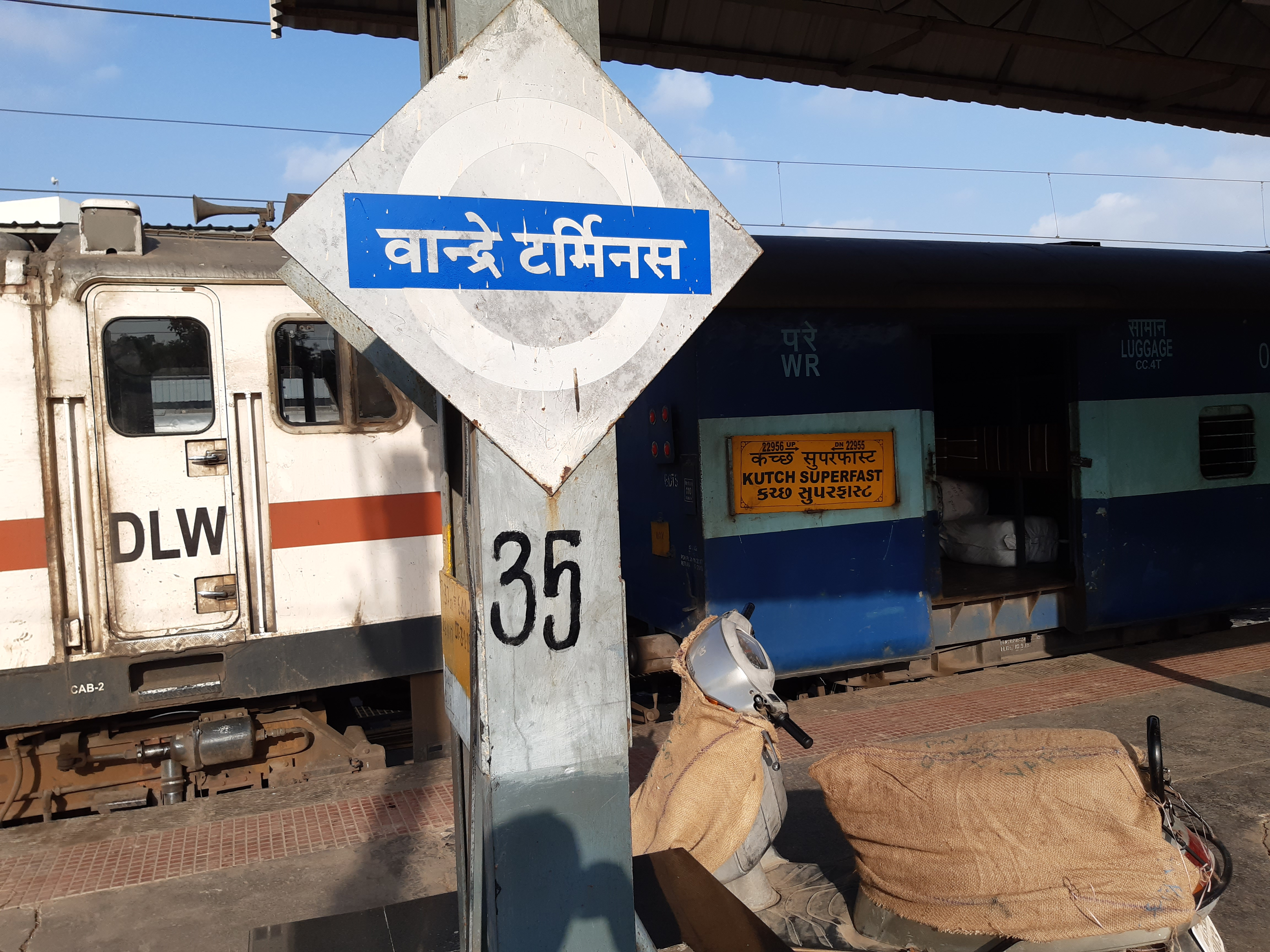
22955 Kutch Express at Bandra Terminus

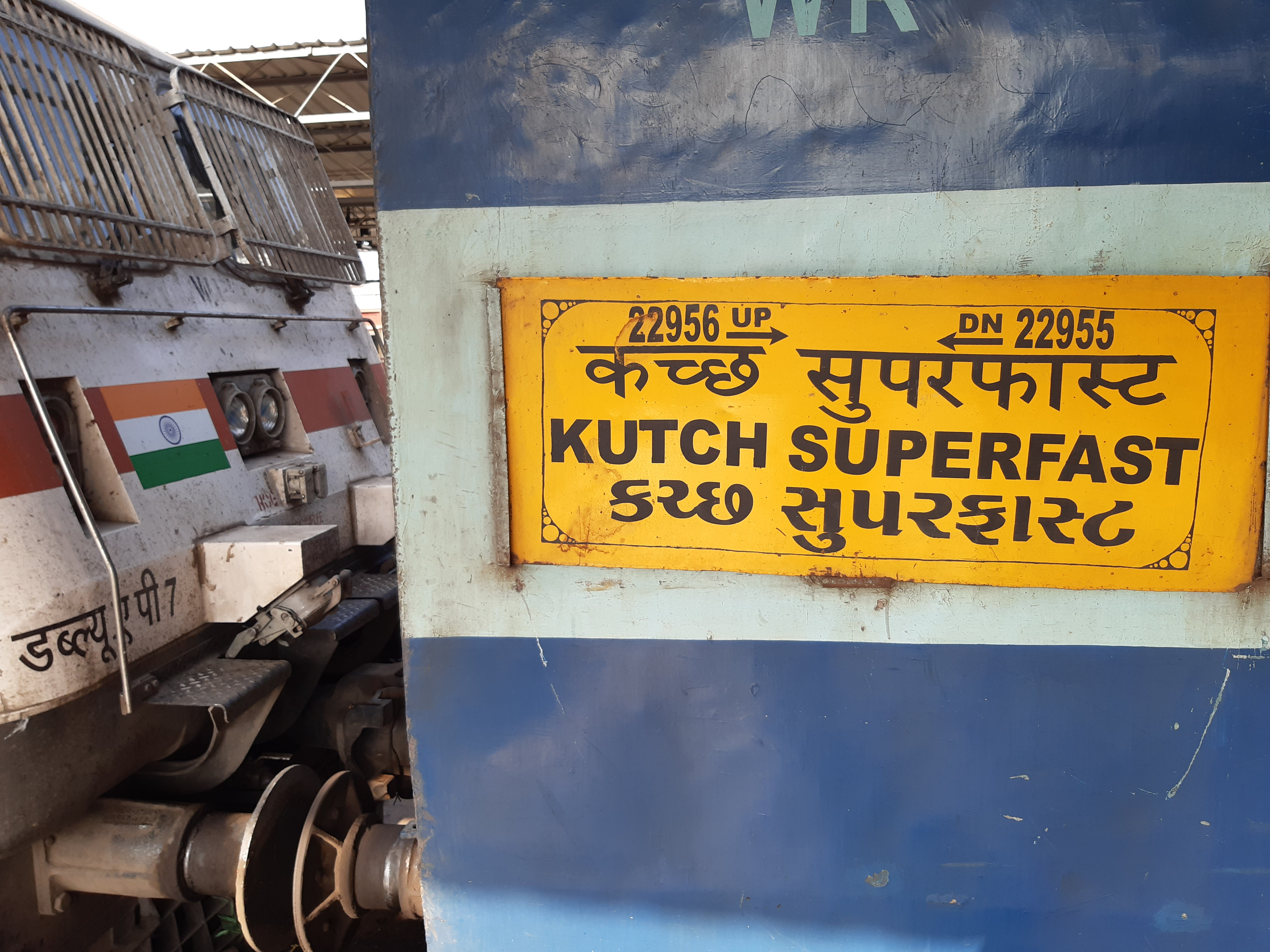
22955 Kutch Express – Trainboard with HOG-equipped Vadodara-based WAP-7 loco

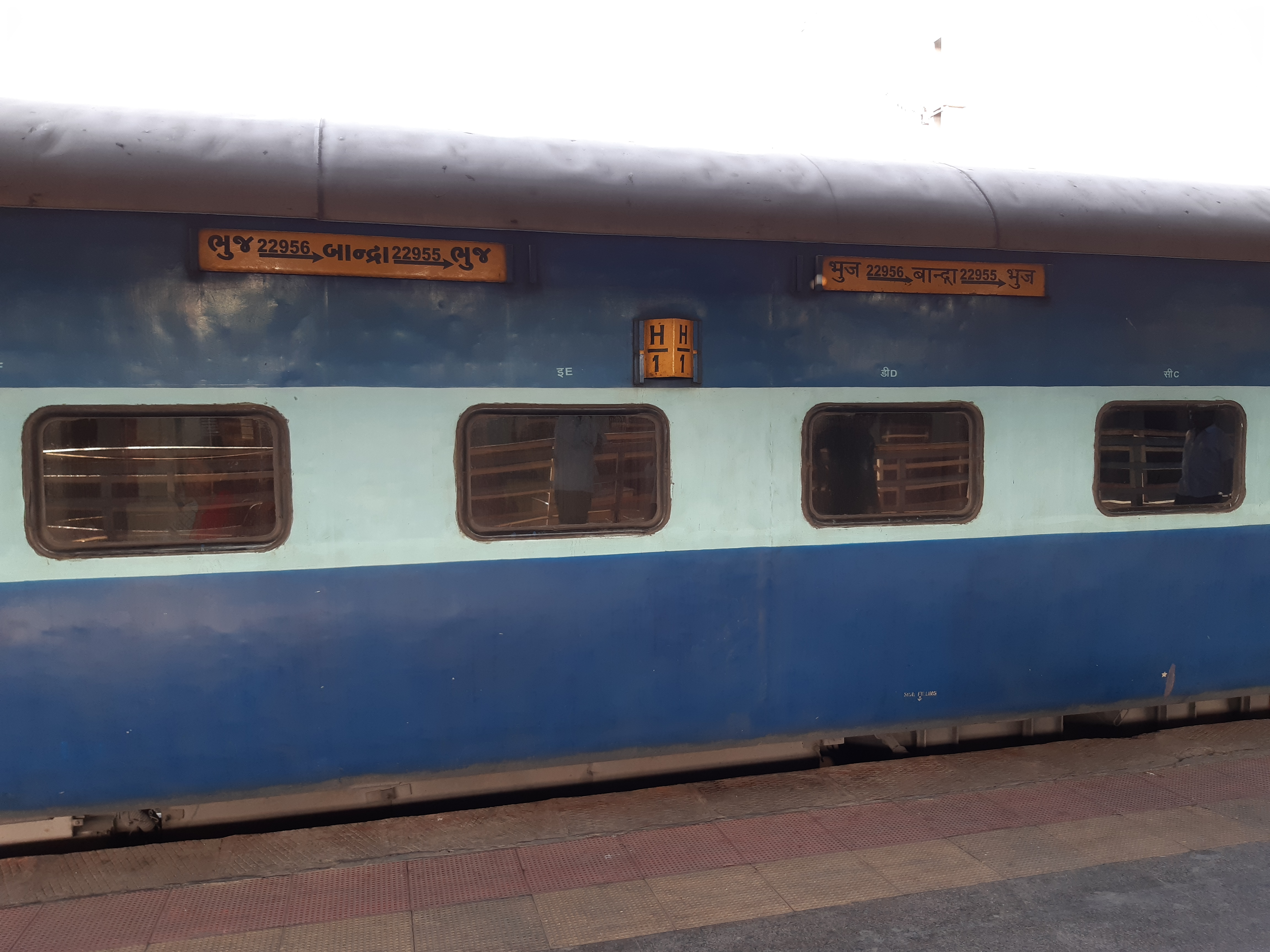
22955 Kutch Express – AC 1st Class coach

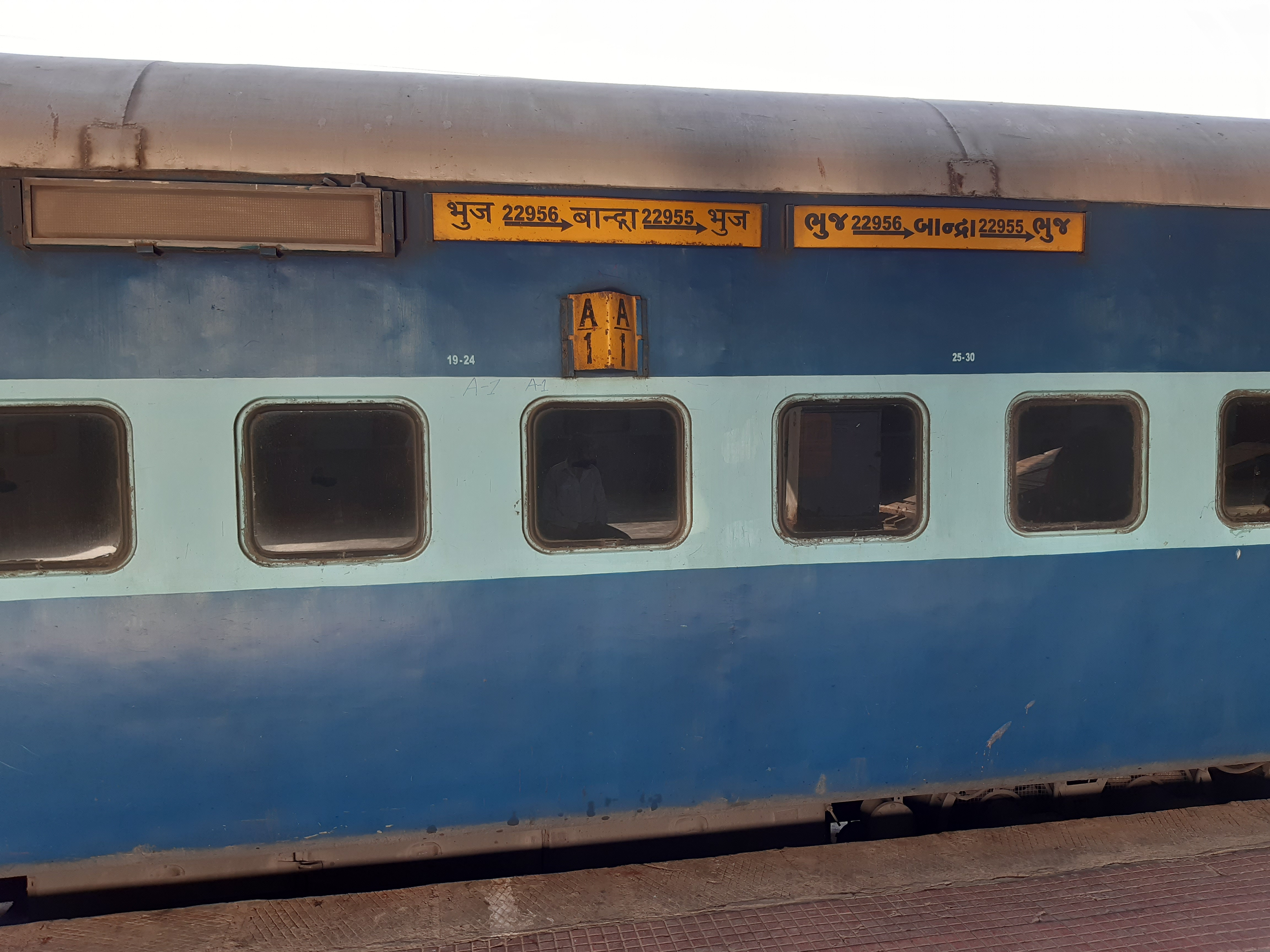
22955 Kutch Express – AC 2 tier coach

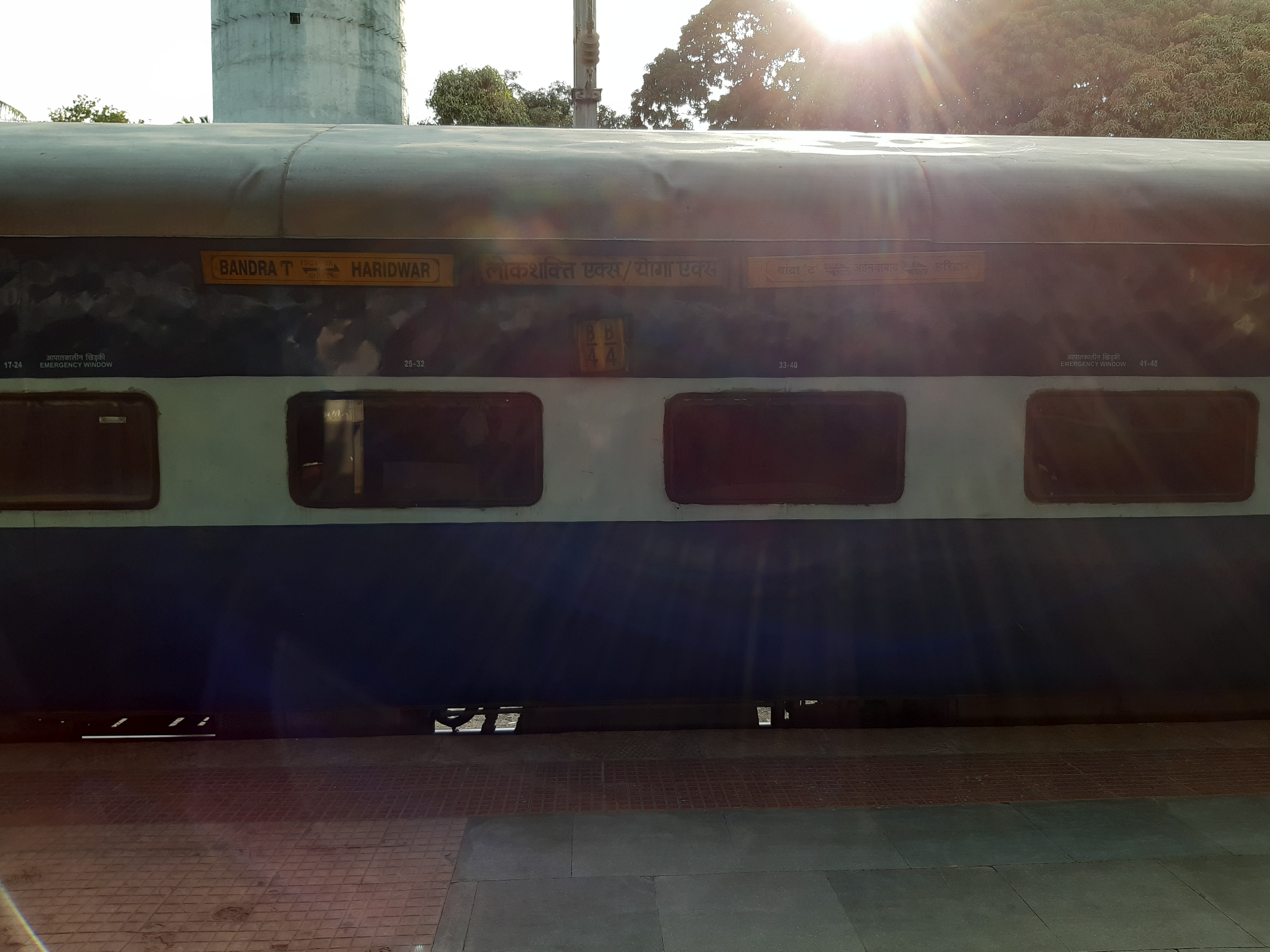
22955 Kutch Express – AC 3 tier coach

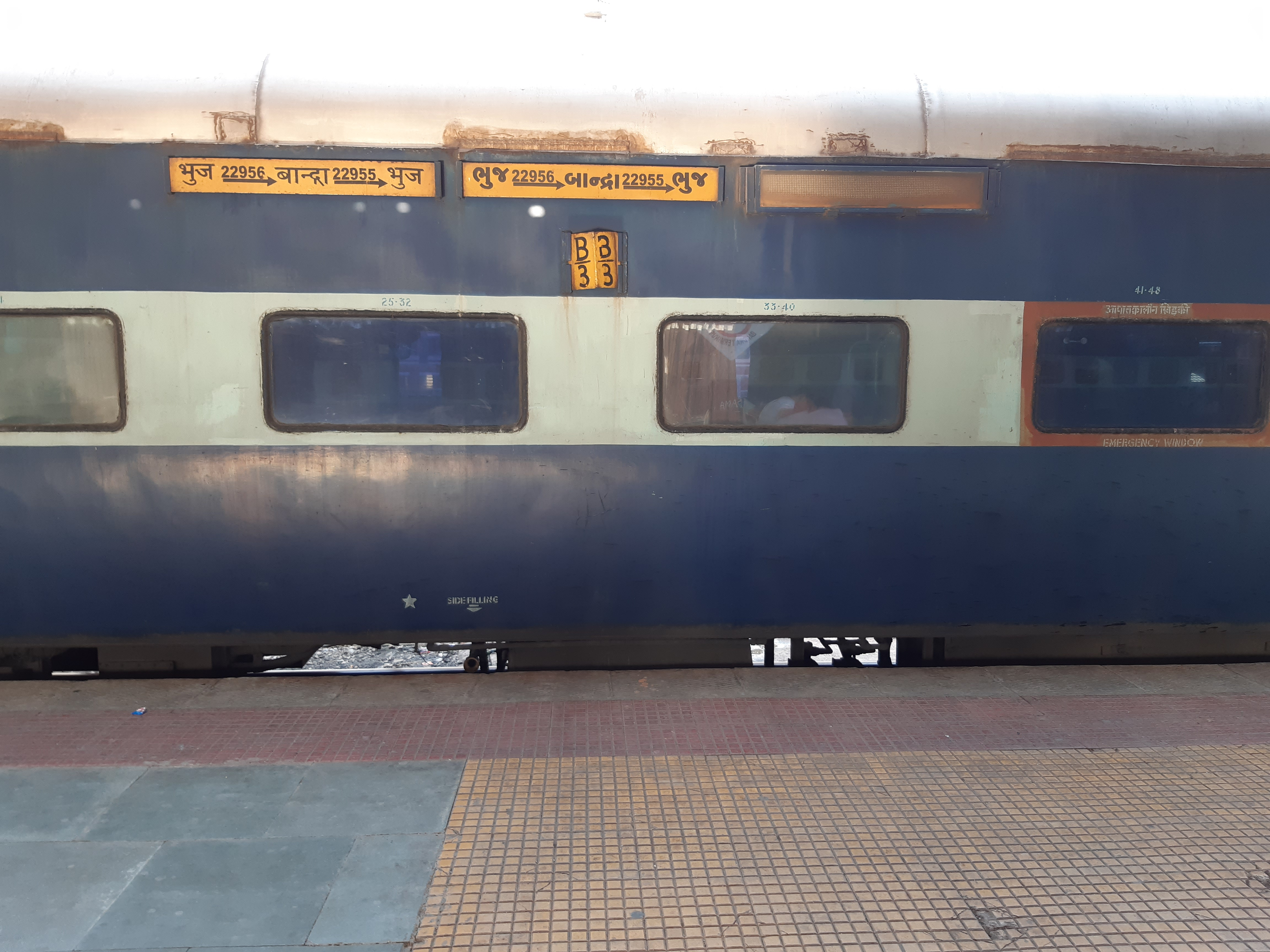
22955 Kutch Express – AC 3 tier coach – B3

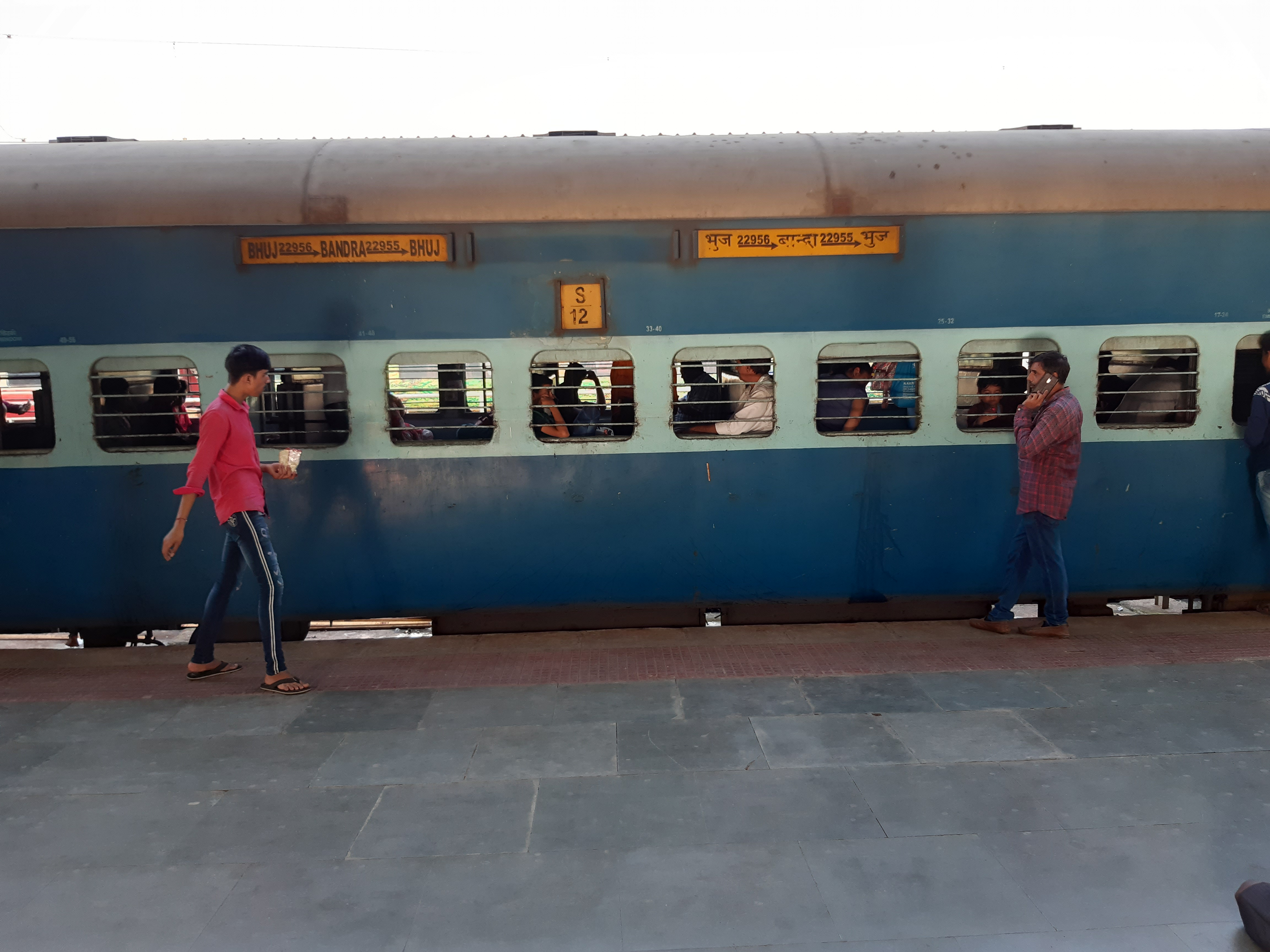
22955 Kutch Express – Sleeper Class coach
