= Kandla =

Kandla કંડલા
- Census Town
- Location in Gujarat, India Kandla (India)
- Coordinates: 23.03°N 70.22°E
- Country: India
- State: Gujarat
- District: Kutch
- Founder: Khengarji III

Government
  - Development Commissioner: Upendra Goyal, IOFS

Area
  - Total: 2.970 km^{2} (1.147 sq mi)
- Elevation: 3 m (9.8 ft)

Population
  - Total: 15,782
  - Density: 5,314/km^{2} (13,760/sq mi)

Languages
  - Official: Gujarati, Hindi
- Time zone: UTC+5:30 (IST)
- Vehicle registration: GJ-12
- Website: www.deendayalport.gov.in/Default.aspx

Kandla is a census town in the Kutch district of Gujarat state in Western India, near the city of Gandhidham. It occupies 2.970 km^{2} (1.147 sq mi) on the coast of Gulf of Cutch along the banks of the Kandla Creek. According to the 2011 Census of India, Kandla is the census town in India with more than 15 thousand inhabitants within the urban area. Located on the banks of Kandla Creek, it is home to Kandla Port, one of the major ports of India on the west coast. The entire economic activity of the city is centered on the port. Kandla known as India's hub for exporting grains and importing oil.

== Demographics ==
Consequently, the population increased by 0.72%, from 14,695 as of 2001 census to 15,782 as of 2011 census. As of 2011, the population density is 5,314/km2 and there are a total of 3,574 families residing in the Kandla. There are 9,028 male and 6,754 female citizens—a sex ratio of 748 females per 1000 males, lower than the national average of 926 per 1000. Among children aged 0–6 years, 1,323 are boys and 831 are girls—a ratio of 942 per 1000. Literacy stands at 51.5% (male 61.92%; female 37.24%), lower than the national average of 74.04%.

=== Religion ===
Religion in Kandla (2011)
Islam	54.32%
Hinduism	44.95%
Christianity	0.38%
Other or not stated	0.35%

Muslims are in the majority; Hindus form a very large minority. There are also Christian, Sikh, Jain and Buddhist communities. According to the 2011 census, the religious make-up of Kandla was: Muslims (54.32%), Hindus (44.95%%), Christians (0.38%), Sikhs (0.10%), Buddhists (0.06%) and Jains (0.04%); 0.15% did not state any religion.

== Climate ==
Kandla has a semi-desert climate (BSh) under the Koppen-Geiger classification of climates. The average annual temperature is 24.8 °C. The average rainfall is 420 mm, most of which occurs during the monsoon from June to September.

Climate data for Kandla (1991–2020, extremes 1952–present)
Month	Jan	Feb	Mar	Apr	May	Jun	Jul	Aug	Sep	Oct	Nov	Dec	Year
Record high °C (°F)	35.2 (95.4)	39.1 (102.4)	42.7 (108.9)	45.2 (113.4)	45.9 (114.6)	42.6 (108.7)	40.7 (105.3)	37.6 (99.7)	42.5 (108.5)	41.4 (106.5)	38.6 (101.5)	35.6 (96.1)	45.9 (114.6)
Mean daily maximum °C (°F)	26.8 (80.2)	29.6 (85.3)	33.3 (91.9)	35.7 (96.3)	36.2 (97.2)	36.0 (96.8)	33.6 (92.5)	32.3 (90.1)	33.6 (92.5)	35.4 (95.7)	32.7 (90.9)	28.4 (83.1)	32.8 (91.0)
Mean daily minimum °C (°F)	14.1 (57.4)	16.6 (61.9)	20.7 (69.3)	24.2 (75.6)	26.9 (80.4)	28.3 (82.9)	27.5 (81.5)	26.5 (79.7)	25.9 (78.6)	24.5 (76.1)	20.3 (68.5)	15.8 (60.4)	22.7 (72.9)
Record low °C (°F)	4.4 (39.9)	7.7 (45.9)	12.8 (55.0)	14.4 (57.9)	19.8 (67.6)	22.0 (71.6)	21.2 (70.2)	20.8 (69.4)	20.3 (68.5)	15.0 (59.0)	10.6 (51.1)	7.2 (45.0)	4.4 (39.9)
Average rainfall mm (inches)	0.2 (0.01)	0.2 (0.01)	0.8 (0.03)	0.1 (0.00)	1.4 (0.06)	58.3 (2.30)	179.2 (7.06)	133.5 (5.26)	70.2 (2.76)	11.7 (0.46)	2.6 (0.10)	0.5 (0.02)	458.6 (18.06)
Average rainy days	0.0	0.1	0.2	0.0	0.1	2.1	6.7	6.0	3.0	0.7	0.2	0.0	19.1
Average relative humidity (%) (at 17:30 IST)	42	39	41	48	56	61	68	69	63	49	44	44	52
Source: India Meteorological Department

Climate data for Kandla Airport (1991–2020)
Month	Jan	Feb	Mar	Apr	May	Jun	Jul	Aug	Sep	Oct	Nov	Dec	Year
Record high °C (°F)	34.3 (93.7)	38.0 (100.4)	42.6 (108.7)	46.8 (116.2)	48.4 (119.1)	45.0 (113.0)	40.6 (105.1)	38.6 (101.5)	41.0 (105.8)	41.9 (107.4)	37.5 (99.5)	35.2 (95.4)	48.4 (119.1)
Mean daily maximum °C (°F)	27.6 (81.7)	31.0 (87.8)	35.4 (95.7)	39.5 (103.1)	41.2 (106.2)	38.5 (101.3)	34.9 (94.8)	33.2 (91.8)	34.5 (94.1)	36.6 (97.9)	33.5 (92.3)	29.3 (84.7)	34.6 (94.3)
Mean daily minimum °C (°F)	11.6 (52.9)	14.6 (58.3)	19.1 (66.4)	23.3 (73.9)	26.4 (79.5)	28.1 (82.6)	27.2 (81.0)	25.9 (78.6)	24.7 (76.5)	22.4 (72.3)	18.1 (64.6)	13.2 (55.8)	21.2 (70.2)
Record low °C (°F)	2.9 (37.2)	4.3 (39.7)	10.7 (51.3)	15.2 (59.4)	19.2 (66.6)	19.4 (66.9)	22.6 (72.7)	21.8 (71.2)	18.3 (64.9)	13.7 (56.7)	8.8 (47.8)	5.4 (41.7)	2.9 (37.2)
Source: India Meteorological Department

== Economy ==
The Port of Kandla Special Economic Zone (KASEZ) at Kandla was the first special economic zone to be established in India and in Asia. Established in 1965, the Port of Kandla SEZ is the biggest multiple-product SEZ in the country. Kandla is the first Export Processing Zone in India. Covering over 310 hectares, the special economic zone is just nine kilometers from the Port of Kandla. Today, Port of the town is India's hub for exporting grains and importing oil and one of the highest-earning ports in the country. Major imports entering the Port of Kandla are petroleum, chemicals, and iron and steel and iron machinery, but it also handles salt, textiles, and grain. The town has grown up base on the port with a school and hotel etc.
