= Gandhidham Junction railway station =

Railway station in Gujarat, India

Gandhidham Junction
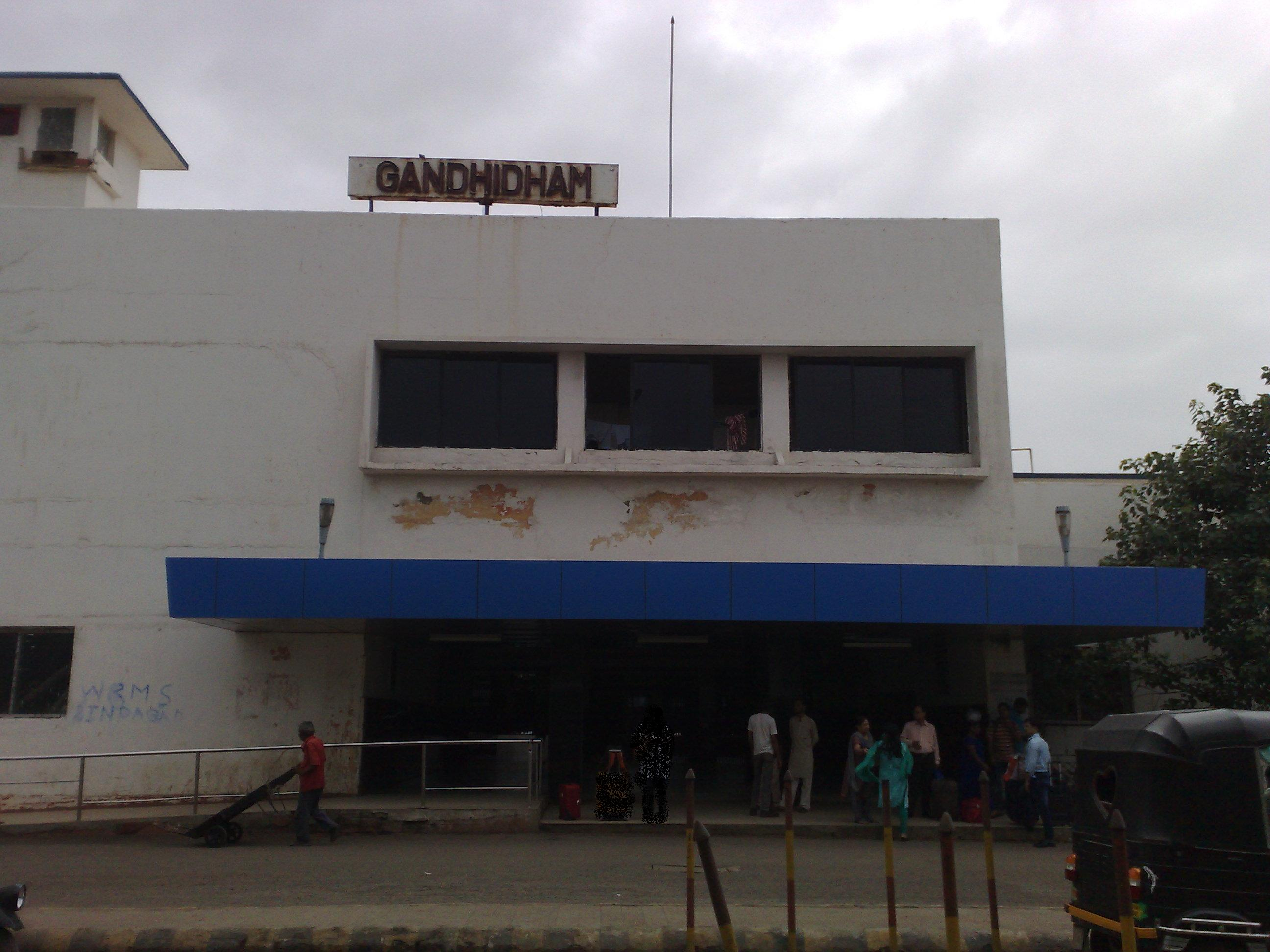

General information
- Location: Gandhidham, Gujarat; India
- Coordinates: 23°04′06″N 70°08′52″E
- Elevation: 10.500 metres (34.45 ft)
- System: Terminal station
- Owner: Indian Railways
- Operator: Western Railway
- Lines: Gandhidham–Bhuj section Gandhidham–Kandla Port section Gandhidham–Palanpur section Gandhidham–Ahmedabad main line
- Platforms: 3
- Tracks: 6
- Connections: Taxi stand, pre-paid auto service

Construction
- Structure type: Standard (on ground)
- Parking: Available

Other information
- Status: Functioning
- Station code: GIMB
- Zone(s): Western Railway
- Division(s): Ahmedabad

History
- Opened: 7 April 1955
- Former names: Cutch State Railway
Location
- Location within India Location within Gujarat

Gandhidham Junction railway station (code: GIMB), located in Gandhidham, Gujarat, India, serves the people residing in Gandhidham and Kandla areas.

== History ==
Before the formation of Gandhidham BG railway station by Indian Railways, the Cutch State Railway operated 2 ft 6inch narrow-gauge railway line. A train used to run towards Anjar from the port of Tuna. The railway was financed by the Maharao Khengarji Bawa of Cutch. This started in 1905.

The railway line was extended from Anjar to Bhuj in 1908.

The rail line from Varshamedi to Bhachau was opened in 1910. The 15 mile rail line from Anjar to Kandla was started in 1930. Another line was laid from Kandla to Disa in North Gujarat in 1950 by the Indian Railways.

== Major trains ==
The list of trains which originate from Gandhidham Junction is as follows:

- Gandhidham–Shri Mata Vaishno Devi Katra Sarvodaya Express (12473/12474)
- Garba Superfast Express (12937/12938)
- Gandhidham–Puri Weekly Superfast Express {via Bhubaneswar) (12993/12994)
- Kamakhya–Gandhidham Express (15567/15668)
- Gandhidham–Nagercoil Express (16335/16336)
- KSR Bangalore–Gandhidham Express (16505/16506)
- Visakhapatnam–Gandhidham Express (20803/20804)
- Tirunelveli–Gandhidham Humsafar Express (20923/20924)
- Gandhidham–Indore Weekly Express (20935/20936)
- Gandhidham–Jodhpur Express (22483/22484)
- Gandhidham–Puri Weekly Express (via Vizianagaram) (22973/22974)

== Railway reorganization ==
Cutch State Railway was merged with the Western Railway on 5 November 1951. The foundation stone of Gandhidham railway station was laid on 7 April 1955. After the gauge conversion of Viramgam–Wankaner–Gandhidham section in the earlier 1980s. the first train from Gandhidham to Mumbai was introduced on 2 October 1984. After the gauge conversion of Gandhidham–Bhuj section in 2001. some of the trains were extended to Bhuj. Gauge conversion of Palanpur–Gandhidham was completed on 24 March 2006. New services were introduced via Palanpur.

== Diesel Loco Shed, Gandhidham ==
Diesel Locomotive Shed, Gandhidham is situated at Gandhidham Junction railway station in Kutch, Gujarat, India. The shed code is GDLG.

Serial no.	Locomotive class	Horsepower	Quantity
1.	WDG-4G	4500	213
2.	WDG-6G	6000	37
Total active locomotives as of February 2026			250

== Achievements ==
In July 2016, Gandhidham was pronounced the second cleanest railway station in India, according to a passenger feedback survey conducted by the Indian Railways as part of the Swacch Bharat Abhiyaan.
