= Swarn Nagari Express =

Train in India

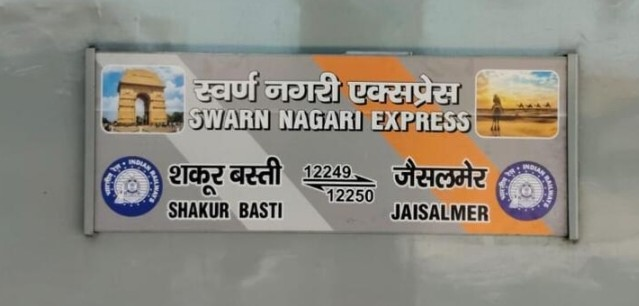

Overview
- Service type: Superfast
- Status: Active
- Locale: New Delhi, Haryana & Rajasthan
- First service: 1 December 2025; 9 months ago
- Current operator: Northern Railway

Route
- Termini: Shakur Basti (SSB); Jaisalmer (JSM)
- Stops: 20
- Distance travelled: 909 km (565 mi)
- Average journey time: 15h 50m
- Service frequency: Daily
- Train number: 12249 / 12250

On-board services
- Classes: AC 1 tier, AC 2 tier, AC 3 tier, Sleeper class, General Unreserved
- Seating arrangements: Yes
- Sleeping arrangements: Yes
- Catering facilities: Available
- Observation facilities: Large windows
- Baggage facilities: No
- Other facilities: Below the seats

Technical
- Rolling stock: LHB coach
- Track gauge: 1,676 mm (5 ft 6 in)
- Operating speed: 56 km/h (35 mph) average including halts.
Route map
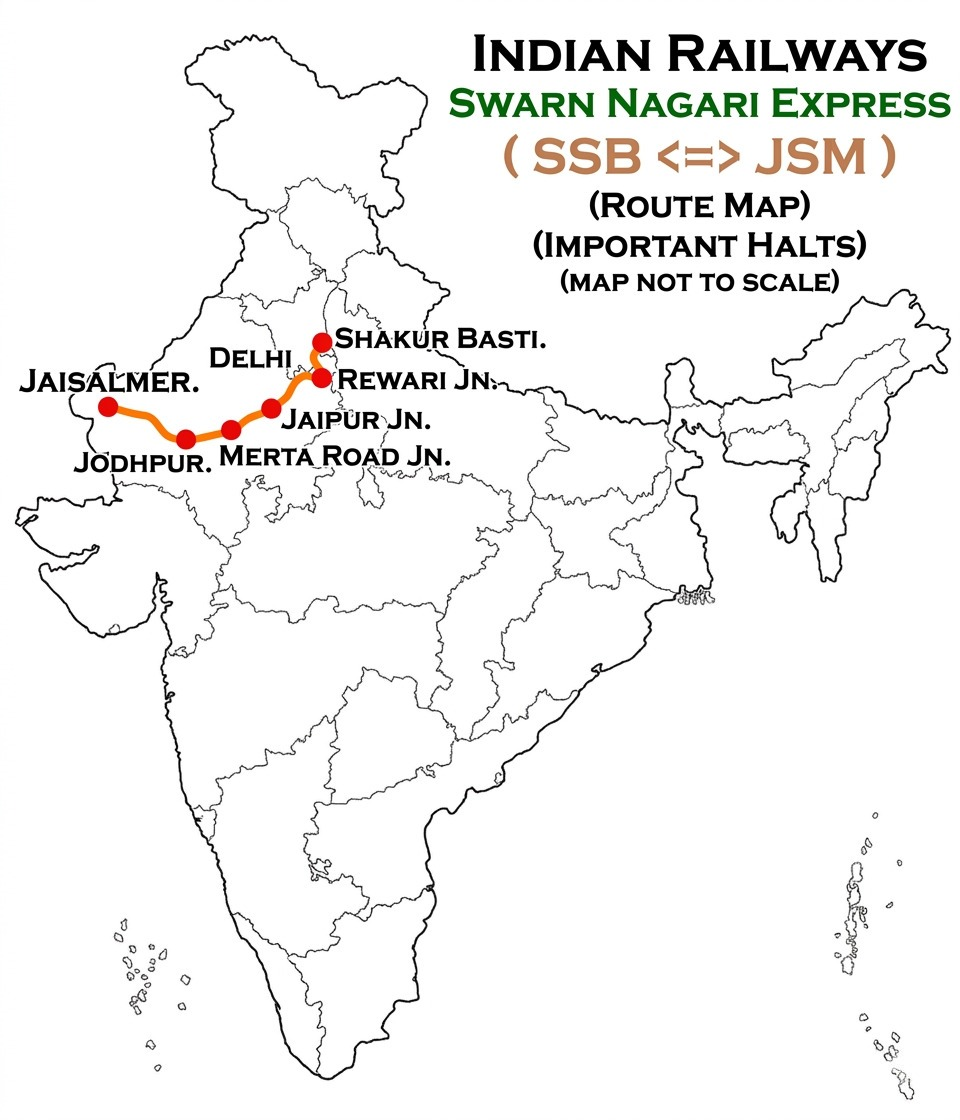

The 12249 / 12250 Swarn Nagari Express is an Superfast Express train belonging to Northern Railway zone that runs between Shakur Basti and Jaisalmer in India.

== Schedule ==
12249 / 12250 Swarn Nagari Express Schedule
| Train Type | Superfast Express |
| Distance | 911 km |
| Average Speed | ~56 km/h |
| Journey Time (SSB → JSM) | 15 hrs 50 min |
| Journey Time (JSM → SSB) | 16 hrs 30 min |
| Classes Available | 1A, 2A, 3A, SL, GEN |
| Operating Days | Daily in both directions |
| Operator | Northern Railway (NR) |

== Route & halts ==
12249 Swarn Nagari Express and 12250 Swarn Nagari Express Schedule
| Sr. | 12249 SSB–JSM EXPRESS (Daily) | | | | 12250 JSM–SSB EXPRESS (Daily) | | | |
| Sr. | Station | Day | Arr. | Dep. | Station | Day | Arr. | Dep. |
|---|---|---|---|---|---|---|---|---|
| 1 | Shakur Basti (SSB) | 1 | — | 17:10 | Jaisalmer (JSM) | 1 | — | 17:00 |
| 2 | Delhi Cantt (DEC) | 1 | 17:54 | 17:56 | Ashapura Gomat (AQG) | 1 | 18:08 | 18:10 |
| 3 | Gurgaon (GGN) | 1 | 18:11 | 18:13 | Ramdevra (RDRA) | 1 | 18:18 | 18:21 |
| 4 | Rewari Jn (RE) | 1 | 19:05 | 19:07 | Phalodi (PLCJ) | 1 | 19:05 | 19:10 |
| 5 | Alwar Jn (AWR) | 1 | 20:06 | 20:09 | Marwar Lohawat (MWT) | 1 | 19:41 | 19:43 |
| 6 | Dausa Jn (DO) | 1 | 21:10 | 21:12 | Osiyan (OSN) | 1 | 20:14 | 20:16 |
| 7 | Jaipur Jn (JP) | 1 | 22:30 | 22:40 | Jodhpur (JU) | 1 | 21:50 | 22:20 |
| 8 | Phulera Jn(FL) | 1 | 23:33 | 23:35 | Merta Road Jn (MTD) | 1 | 23:42 | 23:47 |
| 9 | Nawa City (NAC) | 2 | 00:13 | 00:15 | Degana Jn (DNA) | 2 | 00:18 | 00:21 |
| 10 | Kuchaman City (KMNC) | 2 | 00:29 | 00:31 | Makrana Jn (MKN) | 2 | 00:51 | 00:54 |
| 11 | Makrana Jn (MKN) | 2 | 00:44 | 00:47 | Kuchaman City (KMNC) | 2 | 01:16 | 01:18 |
| 12 | Degana Jn (DNA) | 2 | 01:17 | 01:20 | Nawa City (NAC) | 2 | 01:32 | 01:34 |
| 13 | Merta Road Jn (MTD) | 2 | 01:49 | 01:54 | Phulera Jn (FL) | 2 | 02:25 | 02:27 |
| 14 | Jodhpur (JU) | 2 | 03:40 | 04:00 | Jaipur Jn (JP) | 2 | 03:20 | 03:30 |
| 15 | Osiyan (OSN) | 2 | 05:01 | 05:03 | Dausa Jn (DO) | 2 | 04:14 | 04:16 |
| 16 | Marwar Lohawat (MWT) | 2 | 05:37 | 05:39 | Alwar Jn (AWR) | 2 | 05:29 | 05:32 |
| 17 | Phalodi (PLCJ) | 2 | 06:12 | 06:17 | Rewari Jn (RE) | 2 | 07:28 | 07:30 |
| 18 | Ramdevra (RDRA) | 2 | 07:01 | 07:04 | Gurgaon (GGN) | 2 | 08:18 | 08:20 |
| 19 | Ashapura Gomat (AQG) | 2 | 07:16 | 07:18 | Delhi Cantt (DEC) | 2 | 08:35 | 08:37 |
| 20 | Jaisalmer (JSM) | 2 | 09:00 | — | Shakur Basti (SSB) | 2 | 09:30 | — |

== Traction ==
As the entire route is fully electrified, it is hauled by a Ghaziabad Loco Shed-based WAP-7 electric locomotive from Shakur Basti to Jaisalmer and vice versa.

== Rake Reversal & Share ==
The train will reverse 1 time :

1. Jodhpur

=== The train has 1 Rake Share ===
Mussoorie Express (14041/14042)

== See also ==
No trains from Shakur Basti

Trains from Jaisalmer

1. Jaisalmer–Lalgarh Express
2. Leelan Express
3. Howrah–Jaisalmer Superfast Express
4. Jaisalmer–Jodhpur Express
5. Malani SF Express

== Notes ==
a. Runs daily in a week with both directions.
