= Bandra Terminus–Jaisalmer Superfast Express =

Train in India

- Bandra Terminus Jaisalmer Superfast Express - Train board

Overview
- Service type: Superfast
- Locale: Maharashtra
- Current operator: Western Railway

Route
- Termini: Bandra Terminus (BDTS); Jaisalmer (JSM)
- Stops: 30
- Distance travelled: 1,236 km (768 mi)
- Average journey time: 21 hours 25 mins
- Service frequency: Weekly
- Train number: 22931 / 22932

On-board services
- Classes: First Class, Second Class Seating, General Unreserved
- Seating arrangements: Yes
- Sleeping arrangements: Yes
- Catering facilities: E-catering
- Baggage facilities: Available

Technical
- Rolling stock: LHB coach
- Track gauge: 1,676 mm (5 ft 6 in)

The 22931 / 22932 Bandra Terminus–Jaisalmer Superfast Express is an Superfast train belonging to Indian Railways that run between Bandra Terminus and Jaisalmer in India. It operates as train number 22931 from Bandra Terminus to Jaisalmer and as train number 22932 in the reverse direction.

== History ==
The Bandra Terminus–Jaisalmer Superfast Express (22931/22932) started service on February 24, 2014.

== Coaches ==
Bandra Terminus–Jaisalmer Express presently has 20 coaches, 2 First Class, 4 Third AC, 8 Sleeper coaches, 4 General, 2 End-on Generator. coach composition may be amended at the discretion of Indian Railways depending on demand.

== Service ==
22931 Bandra Terminus–Jaisalmer Express covers the distance of 1236 kilometres in 21 hours 25 mins & 21 hours 25 mins as 22932 Jaisalmer-Bandra Terminus Express.

== Route and halts ==
The Bandra Terminus–Jaisalmer Express has total 30 halts the halts of the train are:

- Bandra Terminus
- Borivali
- Vapi
- Valsad
- Surat
- Bharuch Junction
- Vadodara Junction
- Anand Junction
- Nadiad Junction
- Ahmedabad Junction
- Sabarmati
- Kalol Junction
- Mahesana Junction
- Unjha
- Palanpur Junction
- Abu Road
- Jawai Bandh
- Falna
- Rani
- Marwar Junction
- Pali Marwar
- Luni Junction
- Jodhpur Junction
- Marwar Mathania
- Osiyan
- Phalodi Junction
- Ramdevra
- Pokaran
- Shri Bhadriya Lathi
- Jaisalmer

== Schedule ==
Train number	Station code	Departure station	Departure time	Departure day	Arrival station	Arrival time	Arrival day
22931	BDTS	Bandra Terminus	12:15 PM	Friday	Jaisalmer Railway Station	09:40 AM	Saturday
22932	JSM	Jaisalmer Railway Station	18:10 PM	Saturday	Bandra Terminus	15:50 PM	Sunday
