= Mandor railway station =

Railway station in Rajasthan

General information
- Location: National Highway 62, Jodhpur, Rajasthan; India
- Coordinates: 26.3507°N 73.0420°E
- Elevation: 244 metres (801 ft)
- System: Indian Railways station
- Owner: Indian Railways
- Operator: North Western Railway
- Line: Jodhpur–Jaisalmer line
- Platforms: 2
- Tracks: 3
- Connections: Auto stand

Construction
- Structure type: Standard (on-ground station)
- Parking: No
- Cycle facilities: No

Other information
- Status: Functioning
- Station code: MDB
- Zone(s): North Western Railway
- Division(s): Jodhpur
Location

Mandor railway station is a main railway station in Jodhpur district, Rajasthan. Its code is MDB. It serves Jodhpur city. The station consists of 2 platforms. The platform is not well sheltered. It lacks many facilities including water and sanitation. It is located approximately 8 km from Jodhpur railway station. The railway station is under the administrative control of North Western Railway of Indian Railways.

== Major trains ==
Some of the important trains that run from Mandor are:

- Ranikhet Express
- Corbett Park Link Express
- Jodhpur–Jaisalmer Passenger
