= Shalimar Express (India) =

Train in India

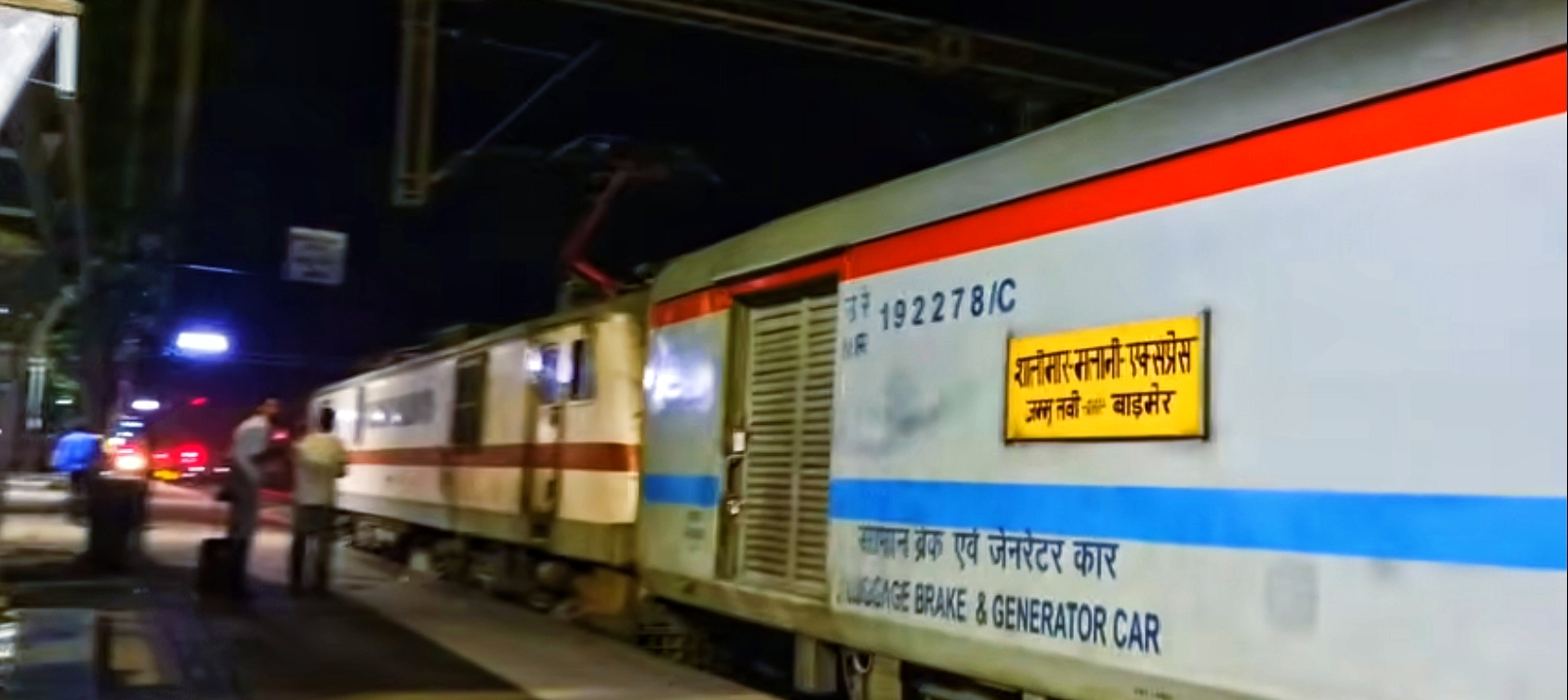
- Shalimar Express At Rajpura Junction

Overview
- Service type: Express
- First service: 1 October 1982; 43 years ago
- Last service: Permanently cancelled from 30 January 2024; 2 years ago
- Current operator: Northern Railways

Route
- Termini: Jaisalmer (JSM); Jammu Tawi (JAT)
- Stops: 57
- Distance travelled: 1,558 km (968 mi)
- Average journey time: 30 hrs 25 mins
- Service frequency: 4 days a week
- Train number: 14645 / 14646

On-board services
- Classes: AC First, AC 2 Tier, AC 3 Tier, Sleeper Class, General Unreserved
- Seating arrangements: Yes
- Sleeping arrangements: Yes
- Catering facilities: Available
- Baggage facilities: Available

Technical
- Rolling stock: ICF coach
- Track gauge: Broad Gauge
- Operating speed: 51 km/h (32 mph) average including halts

The 14645 / 14646 Shalimar Express is a daily train between Jaisalmer and Jammu Tawi. It is operated by the Northern Railways. Its number is 14645/14646. It comes in the Non Superfast (Mail/Express) trains category of the Indian Railways.

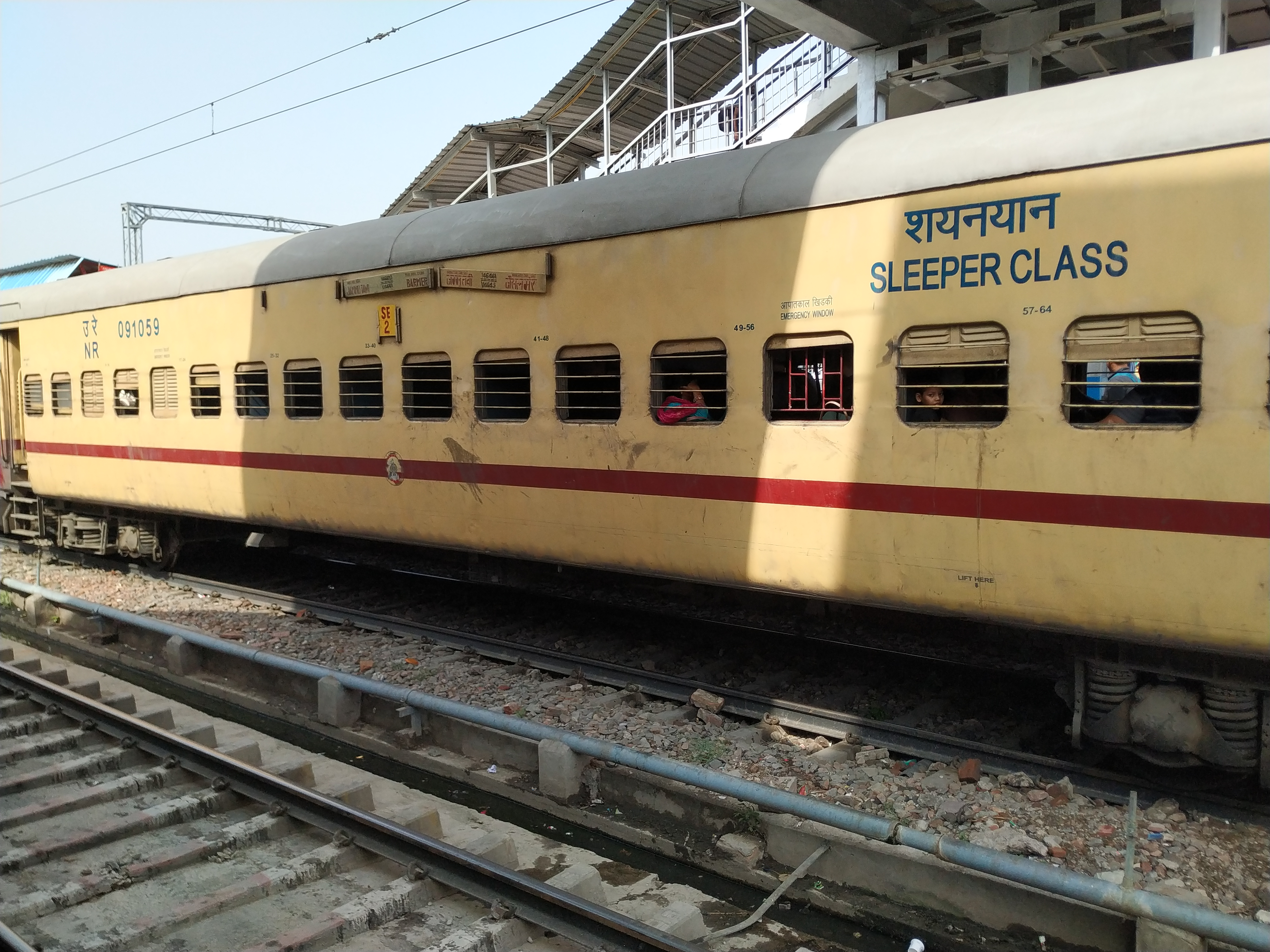
Shalimar Express standing at Meerut City Junction.

== History and etymology ==
The Shalimar Express is one of the oldest trains to Jammu Tawi. It has been given the name 'Shalimar' with reference to the Shalimar Gardens of Srinagar, as Jammu Tawi was the nearest railway station to Srinagar at that time.

== Arrival and departure ==
The train leaves at 15:50 every day from Delhi to Jammu Tawi. It reaches Jammu Tawi the next morning, early, at around 05:20. While heading towards the Capital, it leaves Jammu Tawi at 20:45 from #platform 3 and arrives at Delhi at about 10:50 at platform 1 at the next morning.

== Route and halts ==
It is runs from Jaisalmer via Pokaran, Phalodi Junction, Jodhpur Junction, Merta Road Junction, Phulera Junction, Jaipur Junction, Bandikui Junction, Alwar Junction, Rewari, Gurgaon, old Delhi, Ghaziabad, Meerut City Junction, Saharanpur, Ambala Cantonment, Ludhiana Junction, Jalandhar Cantonment, Pathankot Cantonment, Kathua to Jammu Tawi.

== See also ==
- Jhelum Express
- Vivek Express
- Jammu–Baramulla line
