= Ashapura Gomat railway station =

Railway station in Rajasthan, India

Ashapura Gomat

General information
- Location: Gomat, Jaisalmer district, Rajasthan; India
- Coordinates: 26.950531°N 71.893122°E
- Elevation: 245 metres (804 ft)
- System: Indian Railways station
- Owner: Indian Railways
- Operator: North Western Railway
- Line: Jodhpur–Jaisalmer line
- Platforms: 2
- Tracks: 3

Construction
- Structure type: Standard (on ground station)
- Parking: Yes

Other information
- Status: Active
- Station code: AQG
- Zone(s): North Western Railway
- Division(s): Jodhpur
Location
- Location within India Location within Rajasthan

Ashapura Gomat railway station is a railway station in Jaisalmer district, Rajasthan. Its code is AQG. It serves Gomat. The station consists of 3 platforms. Passenger, Express, and Superfast trains halt here.

== Trains ==
The following trains halt at Ashapura Gomat in both directions:

- Leelan Express
- Ranikhet Express
- Corbett Park Link Express
- Jaisalmer–Jodhpur Express
- Malani Express
- Jaisalmer–Lalgarh Express
