= Ramdevra railway station =

Railway station in Rajasthan, India

Ramdevra

General information
- Location: Ramdevra, Jaisalmer district, Rajasthan; India
- Coordinates: 27.006969°N 71.930438°E
- Elevation: 226 metres (741 ft)
- System: Indian Railways station
- Owner: Indian Railways
- Operator: North Western Railway
- Line: Jodhpur–Jaisalmer line
- Platforms: 2
- Tracks: 2

Construction
- Structure type: Standard (on-ground station)
- Parking: Yes
- Cycle facilities: No

Other information
- Status: Functioning
- Station code: RDRA
- Zone(s): North Western Railway
- Division(s): Jodhpur
Location
- Location within India Location within Rajasthan

Ramdevra railway station is a railway station in Jaisalmer district, Rajasthan. Its code is RDRA. It serves Ramdevra village. The station consists of a pair of platforms. Passenger, Express, and Superfast trains halt here.

== Trains ==
The following trains halt at Ramdevra railway station in both directions:

- Malani Express
- Leelan Express
- Jaisalmer–Jodhpur Express
- Ranikhet Express
- Howrah–Jaisalmer Superfast Express
- Jaisalmer–Lalgarh Express
- Corbett Park Link Express
