= Jaisalmer–Jodhpur Express =

Train in India

Overview
- Service type: Express
- First service: 24 February 2014; 12 years ago
- Current operator: North Western Railway zone

Route
- Termini: Jaisalmer (JSM); Jodhpur Junction (JU)
- Stops: 9
- Distance travelled: 299 km (186 mi)
- Average journey time: 6h 15m
- Service frequency: Daily (Note: Runs seven days in a week for every direction.)
- Train number: 14809/14810

On-board services
- Classes: AC 3 tier, Sleeper class, General Unreserved
- Seating arrangements: No
- Sleeping arrangements: Yes
- Catering facilities: On-board catering E-catering
- Observation facilities: ICF coach
- Entertainment facilities: No
- Baggage facilities: No
- Other facilities: Below the seats

Technical
- Rolling stock: 2
- Track gauge: 1,676 mm (5 ft 6 in)
- Operating speed: 48 km/h (30 mph), including halts

The Jaisalmer–Jodhpur Express is an Express train belonging to North Western Railway zone that runs between Jaisalmer and Jodhpur Junction in India. It is currently being operated with 14809/14810 train numbers on a daily basis.

== Service ==
The 14809/Jaisalmer–Jodhpur Express has an average speed of 48 km/h and covers 299 km in 6h 15m. The 14810/Jodhpur–Jaisalmer Express has an average speed of 43 km/h and covers 299 km in 7h.

== Route and halts ==
The important halts of the train are:

- Jaisalmer
- Shri Bhadriya Lathi
- Ashapura Gomat
- Pokaran
- Ramdevra
- Phalodi Junction
- Marwar Lohwat
- Osiyan
- Marwar Mathanya
- Raikabag Palace Junction
- Jodhpur Junction

== Coach composition ==
The train has standard ICF rakes with max speed of 110 kmph. The train consists of 18 coaches:

- 1 AC III Tier
- 2 Sleeper coaches
- 12 General Unreserved
- 2 Seating cum Luggage Rake

== Traction ==
Both trains are hauled by an Abu Road Loco Shed-based WDP-4D diesel locomotive from Jodhpur to Jaisalmer and vice versa.

== Direction reversal ==
The train reverses its direction 1 times:

- Pokaran

== See also ==
- Jodhpur Junction railway station
- Jaisalmer railway station
