= Pataudi Road railway station =

Railway station in Haryana, India

Pataudi Road Station

General information
- Location: Hailley Mandi, Haryana; India
- Coordinates: 28.3479°N 76.7522°E
- Elevation: 228 metres (748 ft)
- System: Indian Railways station
- Owner: Indian Railways
- Operator: Northern Railway
- Platforms: 3
- Tracks: 4
- Connections: Auto stand

Construction
- Structure type: Standard (on-ground station)
- Parking: No
- Cycle facilities: No

Other information
- Status: Functioning
- Station code: PTRD
- Zone(s): Northern Railway
- Division(s): Delhi
Location

Pataudi Road railway station is a major railway station in Gurgaon district, Haryana, India. Its code is PTRD. It serves Pataudi city. The station consists of three platforms. The platforms are not well sheltered. It lacks many facilities including water and sanitation. The station connects Pataudi town to Delhi and Gurgaon and other important cities in India like Mumbai, Kolkata, Ahmadabad, Ajmer, Jaisalmer, Bhagat Ki Kothi, Jaipur as well as near by areas. The station located on 4 km from Pataudi.

== Major trains ==
Some of the important trains that runs from Pataudi Road are :

- Ranikhet Express
- Ala Hazrat Express (via Ahmedabad)
- Ashram Express
- Ala Hazrat Express (via Bhildi)
- Bhagat Ki Kothi–Delhi Sarai Rohilla Express
- Corbett Park Link Express
- Delhi–Barmer Link Express
- Delhi–Rewari Passenger
- Jodhpur–Delhi Sarai Rohilla Superfast Express
- Malani Express
- Mandore Express
- Meerut Cantt.–Rewari Passenger
- Rewari–Delhi Sarai Rohilla Passenger
- Chetak Express
- Tilak Bridge–Rewari Junction Passenger
- Yoga Express
