= Mahamandir railway station =

Railway station in Rajasthan, India

Mahamandir

General information
- Location: State Highway 61, Jodhpur, Rajasthan; India
- Coordinates: 26.3094°N 73.0388°E
- Elevation: 252 metres (827 ft)
- System: Indian Railways station
- Owner: Indian Railways
- Operator: North Western Railways
- Line: Jodhpur–Jaisalmer line
- Platforms: 2
- Tracks: 3
- Connections: Taxi stand, Auto rickshaw

Construction
- Structure type: Standard (on-ground station)
- Parking: Yes
- Cycle facilities: Yes

Other information
- Status: Functioning
- Station code: MMC
- Zone(s): North Western Railway
- Division(s): Jodhpur

History
- Former names: Jodhpur–Bikaner Railway
Location
- Location within India Location within Rajasthan

Mahamandir railway station is a railway station on the North Western Railways network in the state of Rajasthan. Its code is MMC. It serves Jodhpur city. The station consists of two platforms. The platforms are not well sheltered. It lacks many facilities including water and sanitation. It is located approximately 3 km from Jodhpur railway station.

== Important trains ==
Some of the important trains that run from Mahamandir are:

- Jodhpur–Jaisalmer Passenger
- Jaisalmer–Jodhpur Passenger

== See also ==
- Jodhpur railway station
