= Shalimar Malani Express =

Train in India

Overview
- Service type: Express
- Locale: Rajasthan, Haryana, Delhi, Uttar Pradesh, Punjab & Jammu and Kashmir
- Current operator: Northern Railway

Route
- Termini: Jammu Tawi (JAT); Barmer (BME)
- Stops: 60
- Distance travelled: 1,467 km (912 mi)
- Average journey time: 28 hours 55 minutes
- Service frequency: Daily. (Note: Runs daily for every direction.)
- Train number: 14661 / 14662

On-board services
- Classes: AC 2 Tier, AC 3 Tier, Sleeper Class, General Unreserved
- Seating arrangements: No
- Sleeping arrangements: Yes
- Catering facilities: On-board catering, E-catering
- Observation facilities: Large windows
- Baggage facilities: No
- Other facilities: Below the seats

Technical
- Rolling stock: LHB coach
- Track gauge: 1,676 mm (5 ft 6 in)
- Operating speed: 51 km/h (32 mph) average including halts.

The 14661 / 14662 Shalimar Malani Express is an express train belonging to Northern Railway zone that runs between Jammu Tawi and Barmer in India. It is currently being operated with 14661/14662 train numbers on a daily basis.

== Service ==
The 14661/Shalimar Malani Express has an average speed of 51 km/h and covers 1467 km in 28 hrs 55 mins. The 14662/Shalimar Malani Express has an average speed of 50 km/h and covers 1467 km in 29 hrs 05 mins.

== Route and halts ==
The important halts of the train are:

- Jammu Tawi
- Pathankot Cantonment
- Jalandhar Cantonment
- Ludhiana Junction
- Sirhind
- Ambala Cantonment
- Saharanpur
- Muzaffarnagar
- Meerut City Junction
- Ghaziabad Junction
- Old Delhi Junction
- Delhi Sarai Rohilla
- Delhi Cantonment
- Gurgaon
- Rewari Junction
- Alwar Junction
- Dausa
- Gandhinagar Jaipur
- Jaipur Junction
- Phulera Junction
- Merta Road Junction
- Jodhpur Junction
- Luni Junction
- Samdari Junction
- Balotra
- Barmer

== Coach composition ==
The train has LHB rakes with max speed of 130 km/h. The train consists of 18 coaches:

- 1 First AC and Second AC
- 1 AC II Tier
- 1 AC III Tier
- 8 Sleeper coaches
- 5 General
- 2 Seating cum Luggage Rake

== Traction ==
Both trains are hauled by an Bhagat Ki Kothi Loco Shed-based WAP-7 electric locomotive from Jammu Tawi to Jodhpur. From Jodhpur it is hauled by a Bhagat Ki Kothi Loco Shed-based WDP-4 / WDP-4D diesel locomotive till Barmer and vice versa.

== Rake sharing ==
The train shares its rake with;

- 14646/14645 Shalimar Express
- 14659/14660 Malani Express

== See also ==
- Old Delhi railway station
- Barmer railway station
- Malani Express
