= Kolayat railway station =

Railway station in Rajasthan, India

Kolayat

General information
- Location: Kolayat, Bikaner district, Rajasthan; India
- Coordinates: 27.836095°N 72.955379°E
- Elevation: 215 metres (705 ft)
- System: Indian Railways station
- Owner: Indian Railways
- Operator: North Western Railway
- Line: Phalodi–Bikaner line
- Platforms: 2
- Tracks: 2

Construction
- Structure type: Standard (on ground station)
- Parking: Yes

Other information
- Status: Functioning
- Station code: KLYT
- Zone(s): North Western Railway
- Division(s): Bikaner
Location
- Location within India Location within Rajasthan

Kolayat railway station is a railway station in Bikaner district, Rajasthan. Its code is KLYT. It serves Kolayat town. The station consists of 2 platforms. Passenger, express, and superfast trains halt here.

== Trains ==
The following trains halt at Kolayat railway station in both directions:

- Leelan Express
- Jaisalmer–Lalgarh Express
- Bhavnagar Terminus–Udhampur Janmabhoomi Express
