= Khajwana railway station =

Railway station in Rajasthan, India

Khajwana

General information
- Location: State Highway 63, Khajwana, Nagaur district, Rajasthan; India
- Coordinates: 26.923262°N 73.861764°E
- Elevation: 329 metres (1,079 ft)
- System: Indian Railways station
- Owner: Indian Railways
- Operator: North Western Railway
- Line: Jodhpur–Bathinda line
- Platforms: 1
- Tracks: Single Electric-Line

Construction
- Structure type: Standard (on-ground station)

Other information
- Status: Functioning
- Station code: KJW
- Zone(s): North Western Railway
- Division(s): Jodhpur

Services
Preceding station	Indian Railways	Following station
Deswal towards ?	North Western Railway zone Jodhpur–Bathinda line	Marwar Mundwa towards ?
Location
- Interactive map

Khajwana railway station is a railway station located on the Jodhpur–Bathinda railway line operated by the North Western Railway zone under Jodhpur railway division. It is situated beside State Highway 63 at Khajwana in Nagaur district in the Indian state of Rajasthan.
