= MMY =

MMY or mmy may refer to:

== Transport ==
- Malmsbury railway station, Victoria, Australia (V/Line code: MMY)
- Marwar Mathania railway station, Rajasthan, India (IR code:MMY)
- Miyako Airport, Okinawa, Japan (IATA:MMY)
- Montmorency railway station, Melbourne, Victoria, Australia (Metro Trains:MMY)

== Other uses ==
- Mental Measurements Yearbook, an American reference book
- Migaama language, spoken in Chad (ISO 639-3:mmy)
- MMY, The Peggies' greatest hits albums
