= OSN (disambiguation) =

OSN may refer to:

- OSN, a multinational premium entertainment content company based in Dubai
- OSN (rapper), a Taiwanese rapper and singer
- Osan Air Base, the IATA code OSN
- Osiyan railway station, the station code OSN
- ISO 639:osn, the ISO 639 code for the Old Sundanese language
- Ocean State Networks, a channel that replaces NewsChannel 5
- Oregon Steam Navigation Company
