= MWT =

MWT or mwt may refer to:

- Melbourne Workers Theatre, a defunct Australian theatre company based in Melbourne
- MWT, the Indian Railways station code for Marwar Lohawat railway station, Rajasthan, India
- mwt, the ISO 639-3 code for Moken language, Thailand and Myanmar
