= Sanu railway station =

Railway station in Rajasthan, India

General information
- Location: Sanu, Rajasthan; India
- Elevation: 214 metres (702 ft)
- System: Indian Railways station
- Owner: Indian Railways
- Operator: North Western Railway
- Line: Jaisalmer–Sanu line
- Platforms: 2
- Tracks: 4
- Connections: Auto stand

Construction
- Structure type: Standard (on-ground station)
- Parking: No
- Cycle facilities: No

Other information
- Status: operational
- Station code: SANU
- Zone(s): North Western Railway
- Division(s): Jodhpur

History
- Opened: August 2020

Sanu railway station is a small railway station in Jaisalmer district, Rajasthan. Its code is SANU. It serves Sanu town. The station consists of two platforms. The station is the terminal on Jaisalmer–Sanu line and last Indian station in Jaisalmer district towards Pakistan. This station is for transport of limestone. There is no passenger train scheduled for this station.
