= Raikabag Palace Junction railway station =

Railway station in Rajasthan, India

Raikabag Palace Junction

General information
- Location: Jodhpur, Rajasthan; India
- Coordinates: 26.8549°N 75.7867°E
- Elevation: 237 metres (778 ft)
- System: Express train and Passenger train Station
- Owner: Indian Railways
- Operator: North Western Railway zone
- Lines: Jodhpur–Jaisalmer line Jodhpur–Luni section Jodhpur–Bathinda line
- Platforms: 2
- Tracks: 4
- Connections: Taxi stand, Autorickshaw, Rai Ka Bagh Bus Stand

Construction
- Structure type: Standard (on-ground station)
- Parking: Available

Other information
- Status: Functioning
- Station code: RKB
- Zone(s): North Western Railway zone
- Division(s): Jodhpur
Location

Raikabagh Palace Junction railway station is a railway station on the North Western Railways network in the state of Rajasthan, India. It is located approximately 2 km from Jodhpur railway station.

== Platform ==
The station has two platforms. Entry to platform no 1 is from Paota side.

== See also ==
- Jodhpur district
