= Deswal railway station =

Railway station in Rajasthan, India

Deswal

General information
- Location: Deshwal, Nagaur district, Rajasthan; India
- Coordinates: 26.850374°N 73.885443°E
- Elevation: 333 metres (1,093 ft)
- System: Indian Railways station
- Owner: Indian Railways
- Operator: North Western Railway
- Line: Jodhpur–Bathinda line
- Platforms: 1
- Tracks: Single Electric-Line

Construction
- Structure type: Standard (on-ground station)

Other information
- Status: Functioning
- Station code: DSL
- Zone(s): North Western Railway
- Division(s): Jodhpur

Services
| Preceding station | Indian Railways | Following station |
|---|---|---|
| Marwar Chhapri towards ? | North Western Railway zone Jodhpur–Bathinda line | Khajwana towards ? |
Location
- Interactive map

Deswal railway station is a railway station located on the Jodhpur–Bathinda railway line operated by the North Western Railway zone under Jodhpur railway division. It is situated at Deshwal in Nagaur district in the Indian state of Rajasthan.
