= AQG =

AQG or aqg may refer to:

- AQG, the IATA code for Anqing Tianzhushan Airport, Anhui, China
- AQG, the Indian Railways station code for Ashapura Gomat railway station, Rajasthan, India
- aqg, the ISO 639-3 code for Akoko language, Nigeria
