= Lalgarh Junction railway station =

Railway Station in Rajasthan, India

LALGARH JUNCTION

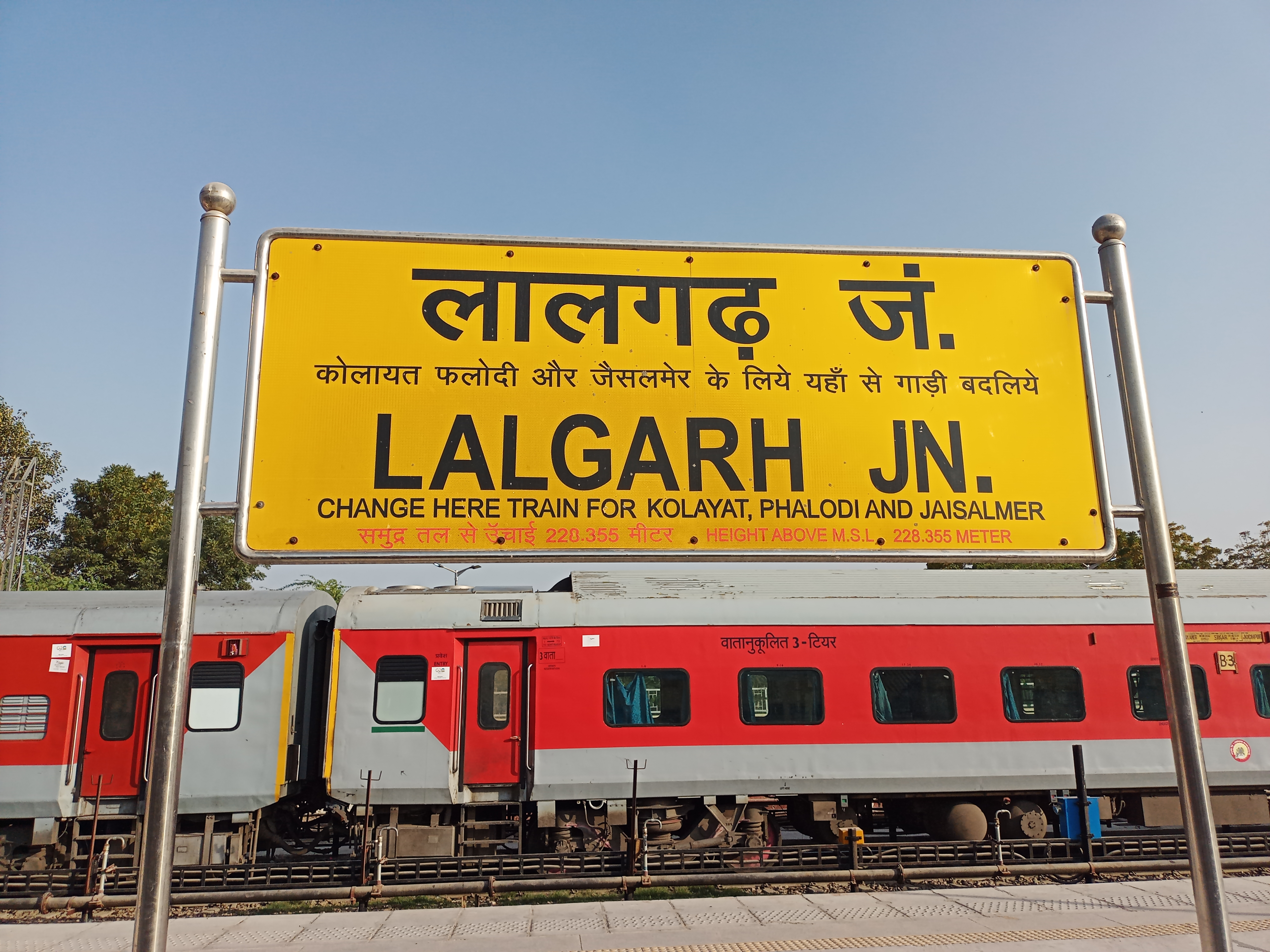
- Lalgarh railway station platform

General information
- Location: Lalgarh, Bikaner, Rajasthan; India
- Coordinates: 28.0436°N 73.3144°E
- Elevation: 225 metres (738 ft)
- System: Indian Railways station
- Owner: Indian Railways
- Operator: North Western Railway
- Lines: Jodhpur–Bathinda line, Phalodi–Lalgarh line
- Platforms: 3
- Tracks: 7
- Connections: Auto stand, Ola Cabs

Construction
- Structure type: Standard (on ground station)
- Parking: No
- Cycle facilities: No

Other information
- Status: Functioning
- Station code: LGH
- Zone(s): North Western Railway
- Division(s): Bikaner
Location
- Location within India Location within Rajasthan
- Interactive map of Lalgarh Junction

Lalgarh Junction railway station is a main railway station in Bikaner district, Rajasthan. Its code is LGH. It serves the northern part of Bikaner city. The station consists of three platforms. The platforms are not well sheltered. It lacks many facilities including water and sanitation.

== Major trains ==
Some of the important trains that run from Lalgarh are:

- Ranakpur Express
- Kalka–Barmer Express
- Bhavnagar Terminus–Udhampur Janmabhoomi Express
- Barmer–Haridwar Link Express
- Jaisalmer–Lalgarh Express
- Ahmedabad–Jammu Tawi Express
- Avadh Assam Express
- Kalka–Barmer Express
- Delhi Sarai Rohilla–Bikaner Express (via Sri Ganganagar)
- Delhi Sarai Rohilla–Bikaner Superfast Express
- Bikaner–Delhi Sarai Rohilla Intercity Express
- Jaisalmer–Bikaner Express
- Kota–Shri Ganganagar Superfast Expres
- Leelan Express
- Shri Ganganagar–Tiruchichirappalli Humsafar Express
- Howrah–Jaisalmer Superfast Express
