= Marwar Chhapri railway station =

Railway station in Rajasthan, India

Marwar Chhapri

General information
- Location: Kheduli, Nagaur district, Rajasthan; India
- Coordinates: 26.783488°N 73.907394°E
- Elevation: 319 metres (1,047 ft)
- System: Indian Railways station
- Owner: Indian Railways
- Operator: North Western Railway
- Line: Jodhpur–Bathinda line
- Platforms: 2
- Tracks: Double Electric-Line

Construction
- Structure type: Standard (on-ground station)

Other information
- Status: Functioning
- Station code: MCPE
- Zone(s): North Western Railway
- Division(s): Jodhpur

Services
Preceding station	Indian Railways	Following station
Merta Road Junction towards ?	North Western Railway zone Jodhpur–Bathinda line	Deswal towards ?
Location
- Interactive map

Marwar Chhapri railway station is a railway station located on the Jodhpur–Bathinda railway line operated by the North Western Railway zone under Jodhpur railway division. It is situated at Kheduli in Nagaur district in the Indian state of Rajasthan.
