= Ajmer–Chandigarh Vande Bharat Express =

Vande Bharat Express train route in India

Ajmer Junction – Chandigarh Junction Vande Bharat Express

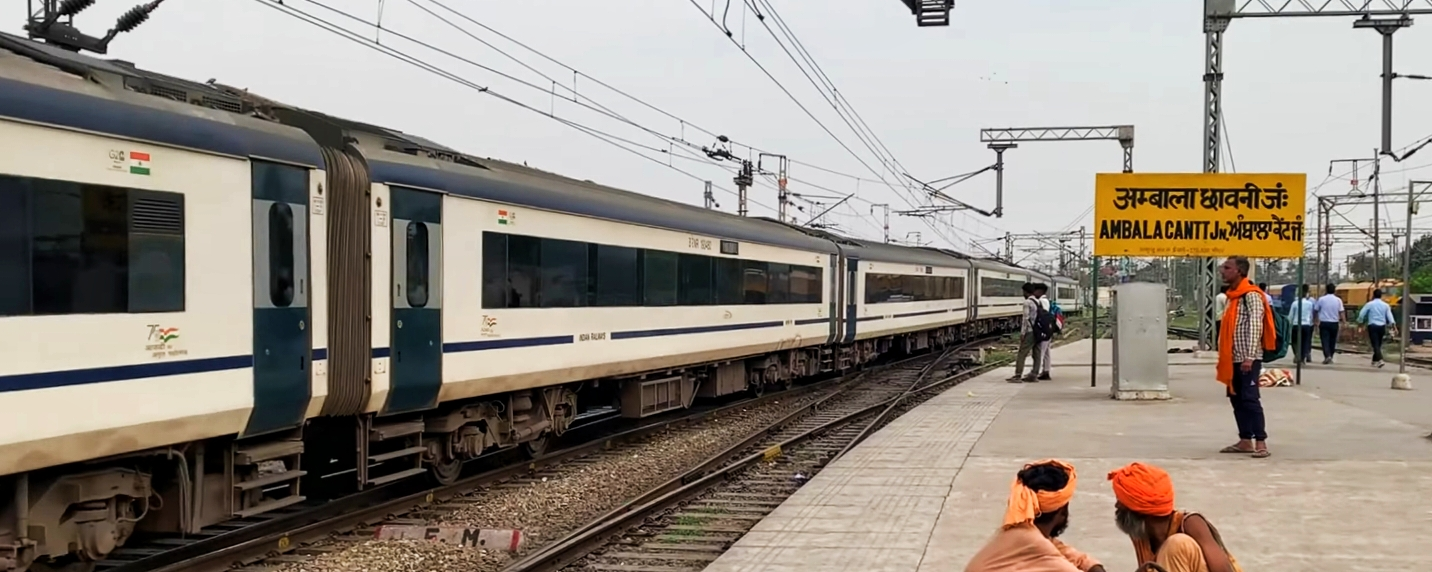
- Ajmer Junction – Chandigarh Junction Vande Bharat Express at Ambala Cantonment

Overview
- Service type: Vande Bharat Express
- Locale: Rajasthan, Haryana, Punjab, Delhi and Chandigarh
- First service: 12 April 2023 (Inaugural run); 13 April 2023; 3 years ago (Commercial run)
- Current operator: North Western Railways (NWR)

Route
- Termini: Ajmer Junction (AII); Chandigarh Junction (CDG)
- Stops: 08
- Distance travelled: 678 km (421 mi)
- Average journey time: 08 hrs 25 mins
- Service frequency: Six days a week (Note: Except Wednesdays)
- Train number: 20977 / 20978
- Lines used: Ahmedabad–Jaipur line; Delhi–Jaipur line; Delhi–Kalka line (till Chandigarh Jn.)

On-board services
- Classes: AC Chair Car, AC Executive Chair Car
- Seating arrangements: Airline style; Rotatable seats
- Sleeping arrangements: No
- Catering facilities: On-board catering
- Observation facilities: Large windows in all coaches
- Entertainment facilities: On-board WiFi; Infotainment system; Electric outlets; Reading light; Seat pockets; Bottle holder; Tray table
- Baggage facilities: Overhead racks
- Other facilities: Kavach

Technical
- Rolling stock: Vande Bharat 3.0
- Track gauge: Indian gauge
- Electrification: 25 kV 50 Hz AC Overhead line
- Operating speed: 81 km/h (50 mph) (Avg.)
- Average length: 480 metres (1,570 ft) (20 coaches)
- Track owner: Indian Railways
- Rake maintenance: Madar Coaching Depot (Ajmer)

The 20977/20978 Ajmer - Chandigarh Vande Bharat Express is India's 14th Vande Bharat Express train, connecting the states of Rajasthan, Punjab, Haryana, New Delhi and Chandigarh. This express train is an extension of the former Vande Bharat Express train which ran from Ajmer Junction till Delhi Cantonment.

== Overview ==
This train is operated by Indian Railways, connecting Ajmer Jn, Kishangarh, Jaipur Jn, Gandhinagar Jaipur, Alwar Jn, Rewari Jn, Gurgaon, Delhi Cantonment, Ambala Cantonment Jn and Chandigarh Jn. It is currently operated with train numbers 20977/20978 on 6 days a week basis.

== Rakes ==
It is the twelfth 2nd Generation Vande Bharat Express train and was designed and manufactured by the Integral Coach Factory (ICF) under the leadership of Sudhanshu Mani at Perambur, Chennai under the Make in India initiative.

The Ajmer–Chandigarh Vande Bharat Express is the world's first semi high-speed passenger train on high rise overhead electric (OHE) territory.

== See also ==
- Vande Bharat Express
- Tejas Express
- Gatiman Express
- Ajmer Junction railway station
- Delhi Cantonment railway station
- Chandigarh Junction railway station
