= Nawa City railway station =

Railway station in Rajasthan, India

Nawa City

General information
- Location: Nawa City, Nagaur district, Rajasthan; India
- Coordinates: 27.029227°N 75.001158°E
- Elevation: 390 metres (1,280 ft)
- System: Indian Railways station
- Owner: Indian Railways
- Operator: North Western Railway
- Line: Degana–Phulera line
- Platforms: 1
- Tracks: 1

Construction
- Structure type: Standard (on-ground station)
- Parking: Yes
- Cycle facilities: No

Other information
- Status: Functioning
- Station code: NAC
- Zone(s): North Western Railway
- Division(s): Jodhpur
Location
- Location within India Location within Rajasthan

Nawa City railway station is a railway station in Nagaur district, Rajasthan in Northern India. Its code is NAC, and it serves Nawa City. It has a single platform. Passenger, Express, and Superfast trains stop there.
