= Phalodi Junction railway station =

Railway station in Rajasthan, India

Phalodi Junction

General information
- Location: Phalodi, Phalodi district, Rajasthan; India
- Coordinates: 27.125229°N 72.366700°E
- Elevation: 233 metres (764 ft)
- System: Indian Railways station
- Owner: Indian Railways
- Operator: North Western Railway
- Lines: Jodhpur–Jaisalmer line Phalodi–Lalgarh line
- Platforms: 3
- Tracks: 3

Construction
- Structure type: Standard (on-ground station)
- Parking: Yes
- Cycle facilities: No

Other information
- Status: Functioning
- Station code: PLCJ
- Zone(s): North Western Railway
- Division(s): Jodhpur
Location
- Location within India Location within Rajasthan

Phalodi Junction railway station is a railway station in Phalodi district, Rajasthan. Its code is PLCJ. It serves Phalodi town. The station consists of three platforms. Passenger, Express, and Superfast trains halt here.

== Trains ==
The following trains halt at Phalodi Junction railway station in both directions:

- Malani Express
- Leelan Express
- Jaisalmer–Jodhpur Express
- Ranikhet Express
- Howrah–Jaisalmer Superfast Express
- Jaisalmer–Lalgarh Express
- Bhavnagar Terminus–Udhampur Janmabhoomi Express
- Corbett Park Link Express
