= Marwar Lohawat railway station =

Railway station in Jodhpur district, Rajasthan

Marwar Lohawat

General information
- Location: Lohawat, Jodhpur district, Rajasthan; India
- Coordinates: 26.981815°N 72.590076°E
- Elevation: 289 metres (948 ft)
- System: Indian Railways station
- Owner: Indian Railways
- Operator: North Western Railway
- Line: Jodhpur–Jaisalmer line
- Platforms: 1
- Tracks: 3

Construction
- Structure type: Standard (on ground station)
- Parking: Yes

Other information
- Status: Active
- Station code: MWT
- Zone(s): North Western Railway
- Division(s): Jodhpur
Location

Marwar Lohawat railway station is a railway station in Jodhpur district, Rajasthan. Its code is MWT. It serves Lohawat village. The station consists of a single platform. Passenger, Express and Superfast trains halt here.
