= Jaisalmer–Lalgarh Express =

Train in India

Jaisalmer – Lalgarh Express

Overview
- Service type: Express
- Locale: Rajasthan
- Current operator: North Western Railways

Route
- Termini: Jaisalmer (JSM); Lalgarh (LGH)
- Stops: 12
- Distance travelled: 314 km (195 mi)
- Average journey time: 6h 35m
- Service frequency: Daily (Note: Runs seven days in a week for every direction.)
- Train number: 14703/14704

On-board services
- Classes: AC 3 tier, Chair Car, General Unreserved
- Seating arrangements: No
- Sleeping arrangements: Yes
- Catering facilities: On-board catering E-catering
- Observation facilities: Rake sharing with 12467/12468 Leelan Express
- Other facilities: Below the seats

Technical
- Rolling stock: ICF coach
- Track gauge: 1,676 mm (5 ft 6 in)
- Operating speed: 48 km/h (30 mph) average including halts

The 14703 / 14704 Jaisalmer–Lalgarh Express is an Express train belonging to North Western Railway zone that runs between Jaisalmer and Lalgarh in India. It is currently being operated with 14703/14704 train numbers on a daily basis.

== Service ==
The 14703/Jaisalmer Lalgarh Express has an average speed of 48 km/h and covers 314 km in 6h 35m. The 14704/Lalgarh Jaisalmer Express has an average speed of 50 km/h and covers 314 km in 6h 20m.

== Route and halts ==
The important halts of the train are:

- Jaisalmer
- Shri Bhadriya Lathi
- Ashapura Gomat
- Ramdevra
- Phalodi Junction
- Malhar
- Bap
- Sird
- Nokhra
- Diyatara Road
- Kolayat
- Gajner
- Nal Halt
- Lalgarh Junction

== Coach composition ==
The train has standard ICF rakes with a maximum speed of 110 km/h. The train consists of 12 coaches:

- 2 AC III Tier
- 1 Chair Car
- 6 General
- 2 Second-class Luggage/parcel van

== Traction ==
Both trains are hauled by an Abu Road Loco Shed-based WDM-3A diesel locomotive.

== Rake sharing ==
The train shares its rake with 12467/12468 Leelan Express.

== See also ==
- Jaisalmer railway station
- Lalgarh Junction railway station
- Leelan Express
