= Marwar Mundwa railway station =

Railway station in Rajasthan

Marwar Mundwa

General information
- Location: Mundwa, Nagaur district, Rajasthan; India
- Coordinates: 27.063551°N 73.815766°E
- Elevation: 334 metres (1,096 ft)
- System: Indian Railways station
- Owner: Indian Railways
- Operator: North Western Railway
- Line: Merta Road–Bikaner line
- Platforms: 1
- Tracks: 1

Construction
- Structure type: Standard (on ground station)
- Parking: Yes

Other information
- Status: Functioning
- Station code: MDW
- Zone(s): North Western Railway
- Division(s): Jodhpur
Location
- Location within India Location within Rajasthan

Marwar Mundwa railway station is a railway station in Nagaur district, Rajasthan. Its code is MDW. It serves Mundwa city. The station consists of a single platform. Passenger, Express and Superfast trains halt here.
