= Corbett Park Link Express =

Express train in India

Overview
- Service type: Express
- Locale: Rajasthan, Haryana, Delhi, Uttar Pradesh & Uttarakhand
- Current operator: North Eastern Railway

Route
- Termini: Jaisalmer (JSM); Ramnagar (RMR)
- Stops: 31
- Distance travelled: 1,217 km (756 mi)
- Average journey time: 28 hrs 05 minutes
- Service frequency: Daily. (Note: Runs seven days in a week for every direction.)
- Train number: 25013 / 25014

On-board services
- Classes: AC 2 Tier, AC 3 Tier, Sleeper Class, General Unreserved
- Seating arrangements: No
- Sleeping arrangements: Yes
- Catering facilities: E-catering
- Observation facilities: Large windows
- Baggage facilities: No
- Other facilities: Below the seats

Technical
- Rolling stock: ICF coach
- Track gauge: 1,676 mm (5 ft 6 in)
- Operating speed: 43 km/h (27 mph) average including halts.

The 25013 / 25014 Corbett Park Link Express is an express train belonging to North Western Railway zone that runs between Jaisalmer and Ramnagar in India. It is currently being operated with 25013/25014 train numbers on a daily basis.

== Service ==
- The 25013/Corbett Park Link Express has an average speed of 43 km/h and covers 1217 km in 28h 5m.
- The 25014/Corbett Park Link Express has an average speed of 48 km/h and covers 1217 km in 25h 15m.

== Route and halts ==
The important halts of the train are:

- Jaisalmer
- Raikabag Palace Junction
- Jodhpur Junction
- Bhagat Ki Kothi
- Marwar Junction
- Ajmer Junction
- Jaipur Junction
- Dausa
- Alwar Junction
- Rewari Junction
- Pataudi Road
- Gurgaon
- Delhi Cantonment
- Delhi Sarai Rohilla
- Delhi Junction
- Sahibabad Junction
- Ghaziabad Junction
- Hapur Junction
- Moradabad Junction
- Kashipur Junction
- Ramnagar

== Coach composition ==
The train has standard ICF rakes with a max speed of 110 kmph. The train consists of 8 coaches:

- 1 AC II Tier
- 1 AC III Tier
- 2 Sleeper coaches
- 3 General Unreserved
- 1 Seating cum Luggage Rake

== Traction ==
Both trains are hauled by an Izzatnagar Loco Shed-based WDP-4D diesel locomotive from Jaisalmer to Moradabad. From Moradabad train is hauled by a Tughlakabad Loco Shed-based WDP-4 / WDP-4D until Ramnagar and vice versa.

== Rake sharing ==
The train is attached to Ranikhet Express at Moradabad and runs as Ranikhet Express until Jaisalmer.

== See also ==
- Jaisalmer railway station
- Ramnagar railway station
- Ranikhet Express
