= Shri Bhadriya Lathi railway station =

Railway station in Rajasthan

Shri Bhadriya Lathi

General information
- Location: Shri Bhadriya Lathi, Jaisalmer district, Rajasthan; India
- Coordinates: 27.031062°N 71.516548°E
- Elevation: 198 metres (650 ft)
- System: Indian Railways station
- Owner: Indian Railways
- Operator: North Western Railway
- Line: Jodhpur–Jaisalmer line
- Platforms: 1
- Tracks: 1

Construction
- Structure type: Standard (on ground station)
- Parking: Yes
- Cycle facilities: No

Other information
- Status: Single diesel line
- Station code: SBLT
- Zone(s): North Western Railway
- Division(s): Jodhpur
Location
- Location within India Location within Rajasthan

Shri Bhadriya Lathi railway station is a railway station in Jaisalmer district, Rajasthan. Its code is SBLT. It serves Shri Bhadriya Lathi station. The station consists of a single platform. Passenger, Express, and Superfast trains halt here.
