= Jaisalmer railway station =

Railway station in Rajasthan, India

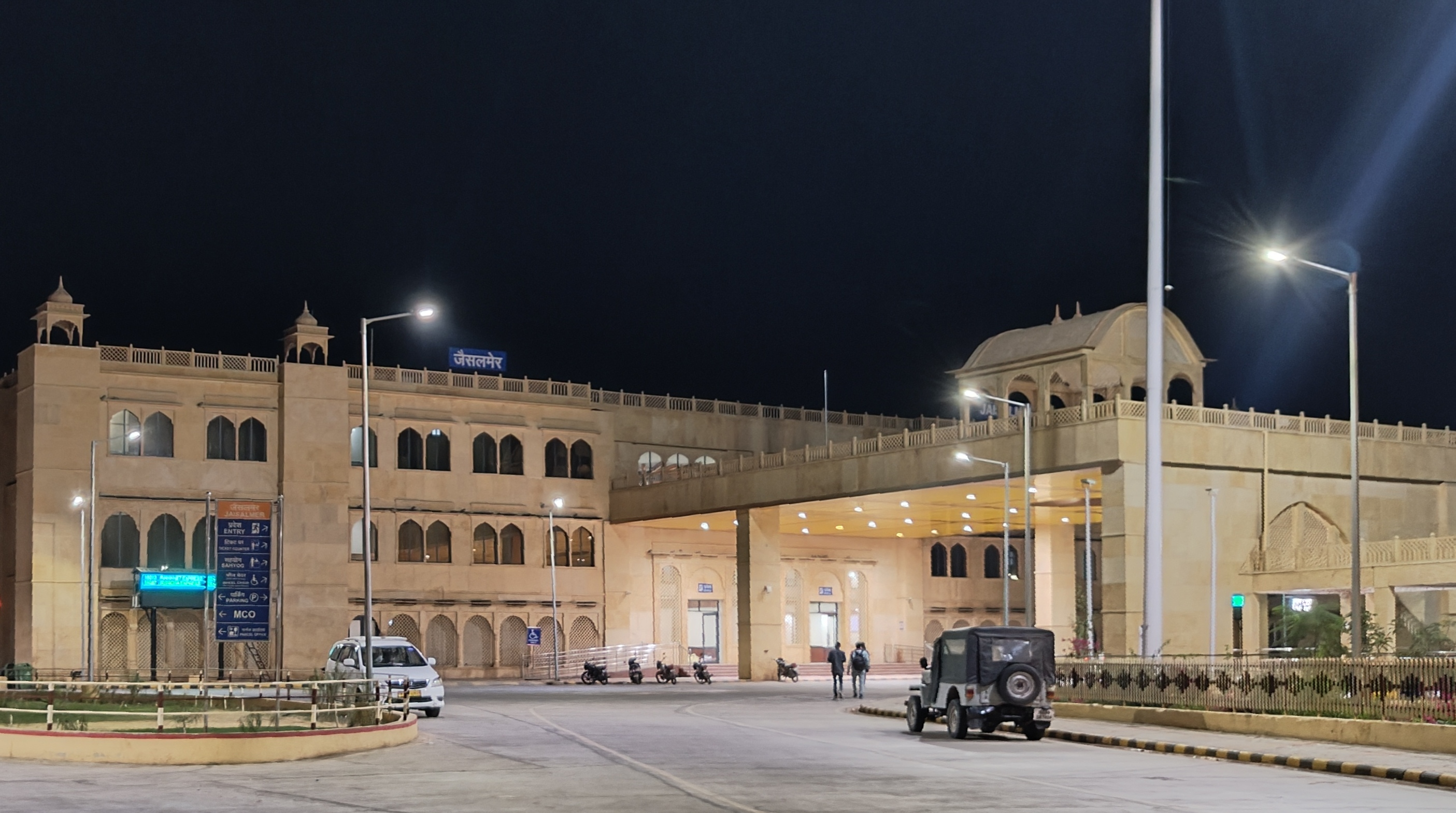
- Jaisalmer railway station at night, redeveloped under the Amrit Bharat Station Scheme.

General information
- Location: Jaisalmer, Rajasthan; India
- Coordinates: 26.9152°N 70.9269°E
- Elevation: 243 m (797 ft)
- System: Regional rail
- Owner: Indian Railways
- Operator: North Western Railway
- Line: Jodhpur–Jaisalmer line
- Platforms: 3
- Tracks: 5
- Connections: Taxi stand, Autorickshaw

Construction
- Structure type: At grade
- Parking: Available

Other information
- Status: Functioning
- Station code: JSM
- Zone(s): North Western Railway Zone
- Division(s): Jodhpur

History
- Opened: 1921; 105 years ago
- Former names: Jodhpur–Bikaner Railway
Route map
Location

Jaisalmer railway station is a major railway station located in Jaisalmer, Rajasthan. The railway station is under the administrative control of North Western Railway of Indian Railways. The station has three platforms and a total of five tracks. Jodhpur- Jaisalmer Railway was merged with the Western Railway in November 1951. Later North Western Railway came into existence on 1 October 2002.

== History ==
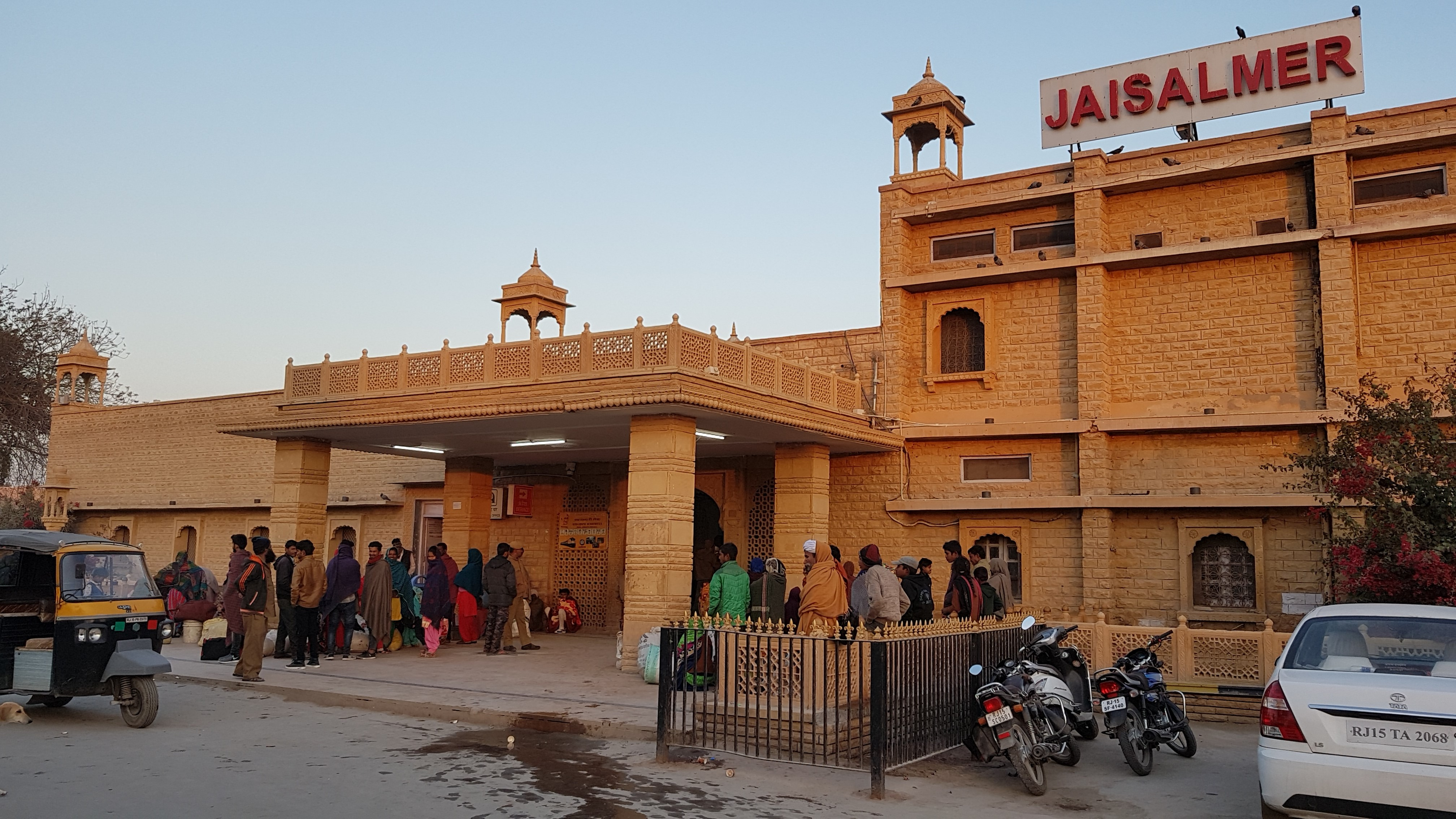
Jaisalmer railway station old building before redevelopment under the Amrit Bharat Station Scheme.

Jaisalmer railway station serves the city of Jaisalmer in Rajasthan and has been an important railhead for the region for many years. Earlier, the station had basic passenger facilities.

The station has recently been redeveloped under the Indian government’s Amrit Bharat Station Scheme at a cost of ₹140 crore. The upgrade includes improved passenger amenities such as air-conditioned waiting halls, escalators, solar panels, and better accessibility features. Completed in October 2025, the redevelopment aims to provide a more comfortable and efficient travel experience. It also supports the growing number of tourists visiting Jaisalmer, known for its desert safaris and historic havelis.

== Trains ==
Some important trains that originate and terminate at the station:

- Shakur Basti–Jaisalmer Superfast Express
- Ranikhet Express
- Corbett Park Link Express
- Jaisalmer–Jodhpur Express
- Jaisalmer–Lalgarh Express
- Malani Express
- Jaisalmer–Jodhpur Passenger
- Howrah–Jaisalmer Superfast Express
- Bandra Terminus–Jaisalmer Superfast Express
- Jaisalmer–Sabarmati Express
- Jammu–Jaisalmer Shalimar Express
