= Malani SF Express =

Indian train express

Malani Express
Overview
- Service type: Superfast Express
- Current operator: Northern zone

Route
- Termini: Old Delhi (DLI); Barmer (BME)
- Distance travelled: 827 km (514 mi)
- Average journey time: 16h 21m
- Service frequency: Daily (Note: Runs seven days in a week for every direction.)

On-board services
- Classes: AC 2 tier, AC 3 tier, Sleeper class, General Unreserved
- Seating arrangements: No
- Sleeping arrangements: Yes
- Catering facilities: On-board catering E-catering
- Observation facilities: ICF coach
- Entertainment facilities: No
- Baggage facilities: No
- Other facilities: Below the seats

Technical
- Rolling stock: 2
- Track gauge: 1,676 mm (5 ft 6 in)
- Operating speed: 51 km/h (32 mph), including halts
Route map
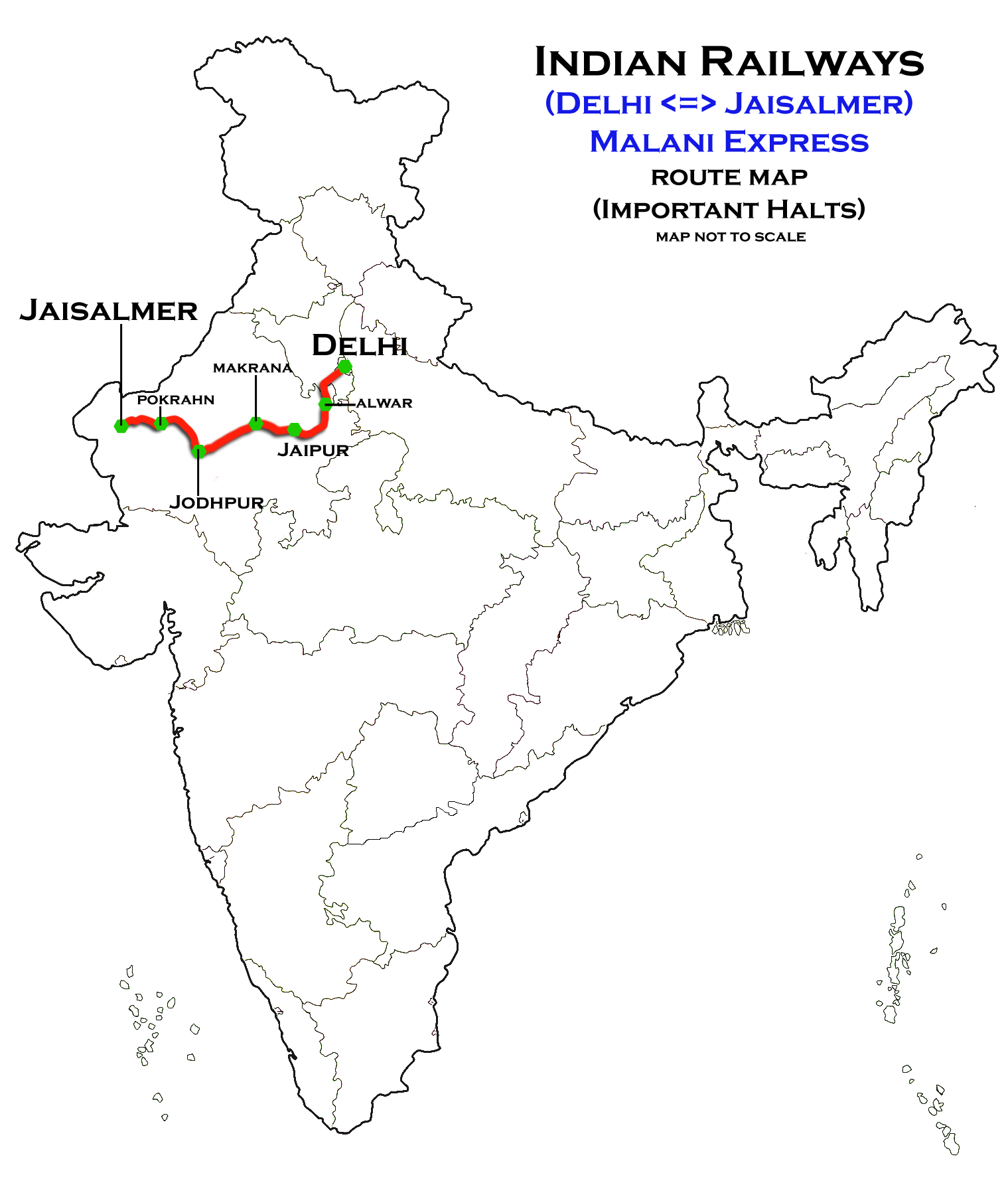

The 20487/88 Malani Express is an Express train belonging to Northern Railway zone that runs between Old Delhi and Barmer in India. It is currently being operated with 14659/14660 train numbers on a daily basis.

== Coach composition ==
The train has standard LHB rakes with a maximum speed of 130 km/h. The train consists of 18 coaches:

- 1 First AC and Second AC
- 2 AC II Tier
- 3 AC III Tier
- 8 Sleeper coaches
- 5 General
- 4 Seating cum Luggage Rake

== Traction ==
Both trains are hauled by an Abu Road Loco Shed-based WDM-3A diesel locomotive from Old Delhi to Jodhpur. From Jodhpur, trains are hauled by an Abu Road Loco Shed-based WDM-3A diesel locomotive to Jaisalmer, and return.

== Direction reversal ==
Train reverses its direction 2 times:

- Jodhpur Junction
- Pokaran

== Rake sharing ==
Before the introduction of Shalimar Malani Express, the train shares its rake with 14646/14645 Shalimar Express and 14661/14662 Delhi–Barmer Link Express.

The train now shares its rakes with 20489/90 Barmer-Mathura SF Express.

== See also ==
- Jaisalmer railway station
- Old Delhi railway station
- Shalimar Express
