= Gurgaon railway station =

Railway station in Haryana, India

Gurugram Gurugram
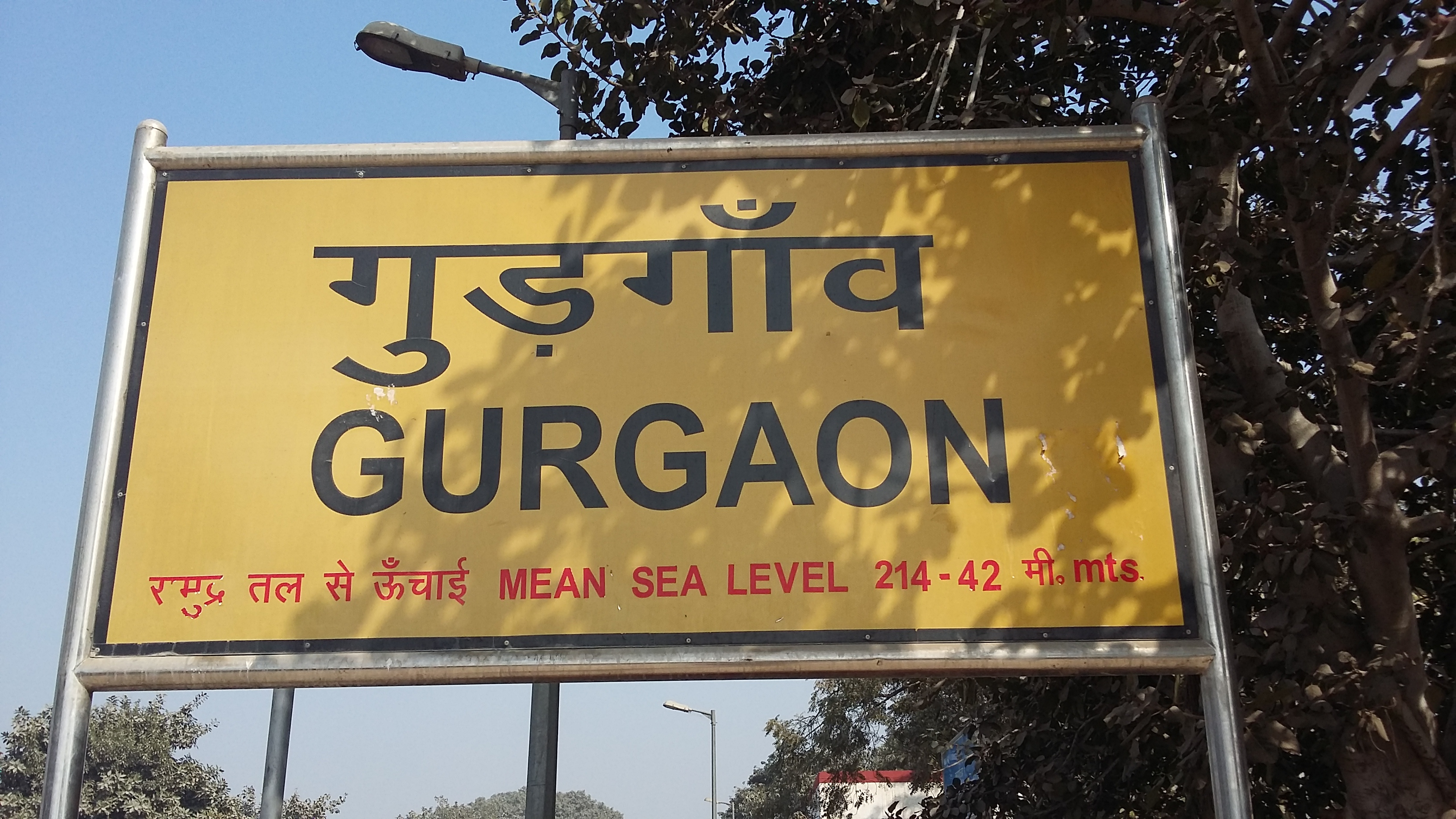

General information
- Location: Railway Road, Gurgaon, Haryana; India
- Coordinates: 28.4891°N 77.0111°E
- Elevation: 214.420 metres (703.48 ft)
- System: Indian Railway and Delhi Suburban Railway station
- Owner: Ministry of Railways (India)
- Operator: Indian Railways
- Platforms: 3
- Tracks: 4 (construction – doubling of electrified broad gauge)
- Connections: Auto stand

Construction
- Structure type: At grade
- Parking: Open parking
- Cycle facilities: No

Other information
- Status: Functioning
- Station code: GGN
- Zone(s): Northern Railway
- Division(s): Delhi
Location
- Location within Haryana Location within India

Gurugram railway station (station code: GGN) is in Gurgaon city of Gurgaon district of Haryana in India.

== History ==
In 2025-26, Gurugram railway station underwent ₹215-220 crore major redevelopment for capacity enhancement, new station building, modern lobby rooms, food court, and a paid lounge.

== Train service ==
Station has 3 platforms which are well sheltered having facilities including water, sanitation, Wifi etc.

=== Rail line ===
The station, on Delhi-Jaipur railway line, is connected to important cities in India like New Delhi, Mumbai, Jaipur, Gandhinagar, Ahmedabad, Kanpur, Chandigarh, Patna, Howrah, Jammu, Vadodara, Surat, Varanasi, Gorakhpur, Ayodhya, Ajmer, Udaipur, Jodhpur, Jaisalmer, Bikaner, Haridwar, Gaya etc.. Gurgaon station is connected to important cities in India like New Delhi, Mumbai, Jaipur, Gandhinagar, Ahmedabad, Kanpur, Chandigarh, Patna, Howrah and Jammu Kamakhya.

=== Major trains ===
Some of the important trains that run from Gurgaon are:

==== Vande Bharat ====
- Delhi Cantonment - Ajmer Vande Bharat Express

==== Garib Rath ====
- Delhi Sarai Rohilla–Bandra Terminus Garib Rath Express

==== Others ====
- Uttaranchal Express
- Ala Hazrat Express (via Bhildi)
- Jaipur–Delhi Sarai Rohilla AC Double Decker Express
- Ajmer–Delhi Sarai Rohilla Jan Shatabdi Express
- Ahmedabad–Delhi Sarai Rohilla Special Fare AC Superfast Special
- Swarna Jayanti Rajdhani Express
- Chetak Express
- Delhi Sarai Rohilla–Jaipur Special Fare Special
- Howrah–Jaisalmer Superfast Express
- Pooja Superfast Express
- Mandore Express
- Malani Express
- Corbett Park Link Express
- Ranikhet Express
- Yoga Express
- Bhagat Ki Kothi–Delhi Sarai Rohilla Express
- Bhagat Ki Kothi–Kamakhya Express
- Udaipur City–New Jalpaiguri Weekly Express

== See also ==
- Yellow Line (Delhi Metro)
- Rapid Metro Gurgaon
