= Howrah–Jaisalmer Superfast Express =

Train in India

Howrah – Jaisalmer Superfast Express

Overview
- Service type: Superfast Express
- First service: 12 March 2012; 14 years ago
- Current operator: Eastern Railways

Route
- Termini: Howrah Junction (HWH); Jaisalmer (JSM)
- Stops: 12
- Distance travelled: 2,249 km (1,397 mi)
- Average journey time: 39 hours 10 minutes
- Service frequency: Weekly (Note: Runs one day in a week for every direction.)
- Train number: 12371 / 12372

On-board services
- Classes: AC 2 tier, AC 3 tier, Sleeper class, General Unreserved
- Seating arrangements: Yes
- Sleeping arrangements: Yes
- Catering facilities: Available
- Observation facilities: Large windows
- Baggage facilities: Below the seats

Technical
- Rolling stock: LHB coach
- Track gauge: 1,676 mm (5 ft 6 in)
- Operating speed: 58 km/h (36 mph) average including halts
Route map
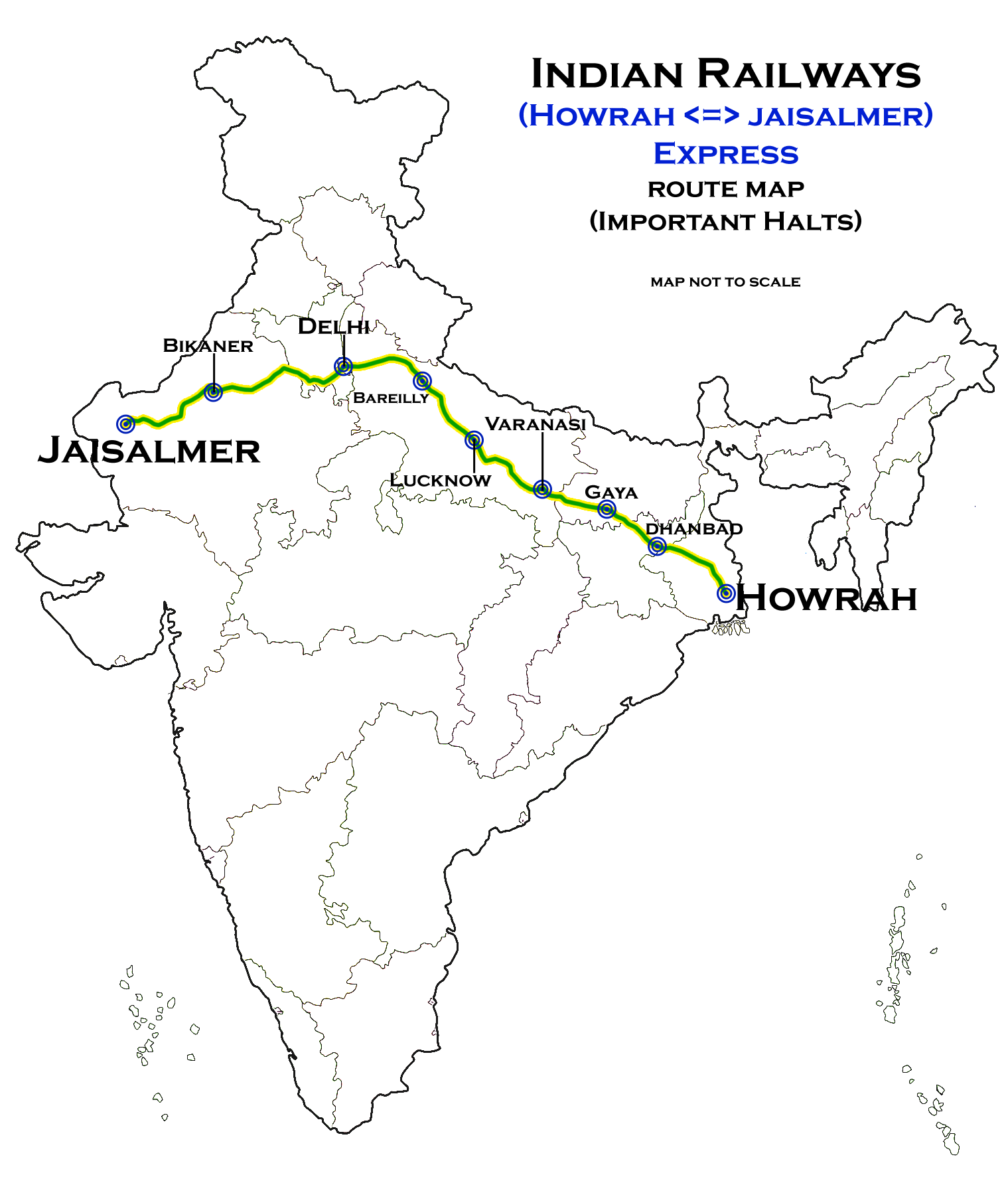

The 12371 / 12372 Howrah–Jaisalmer Superfast Express is a Superfast Express train of the Indian Railways connecting Howrah Junction in West Bengal and Jaisalmer of Rajasthan. It is currently being operated with 12371/12372 train numbers on a weekly basis.

== Service ==
Although named as "superfast express", the 12371 (Howrah–Jaisalmer Superfast Express) and 12372 (Jaisalmer–Howrah Superfast Express) trains have an average speed of only 57 km/h and take 39 hrs 25 mins to cover 2249 km.

== Route & halts ==
The important halts of the train are:

- Howrah
- Durgapur
- Asansol Junction
- Dhanbad Junction
- Gaya Junction
- Mughalsarai Junction
- Varanasi Junction
- Pratapgarh Junction
- Amethi
- Rae Bareli Junction
- Lucknow Charbagh
- Bareilly Junction
- Moradabad Junction
- Ghaziabad Junction
- Delhi Junction
- Delhi Cantonment
- Gurgaon
- Rewari Junction
- Sultanpur Jn
- Churu Junction
- Ratangarh Junction
- Bikaner Junction
- Phalodi Junction
- Ramdevra
- Jaisalmer

== Coach composition ==
The train has got LHB rakes from 26 August 2019, with a maximum speed of 130 km/h. The train consists of 24 coaches:

- 1 First AC
- 1 AC II Tier
- 4 AC III Tier
- 11 Sleeper coaches
- 3 General
- 2 Second-class Luggage/parcel van
- 1 High capacity parcel van
- 1 Pantry car

== Traction ==
Both trains are hauled by a Howrah-based WAP-4 electric locomotive from Howrah to Mughalsarai Junction and from Mughalsarai Junction it is hauled by a Mughalsarai-based WDM-3A diesel locomotive up til Jaisalmer and vice versa.

== See also ==
- Howrah Junction railway station
- Jaisalmer railway station

== Timetable ==
- 12371 – Starts from Howrah every Monday at 8:15 AM and reaches Jaisalmer next day at night 11:50 PM IST
- 12372 – Starts from Jaisalmer every Thursday at afternoon 1:25 AM IST and reaches Howrah next day evening 4:55 PM
