= Leelan Express =

Train in India

Leelan Superfast Express
Overview
- Service type: Superfast
- Status: Operating
- First service: 5 July 2007; 19 years ago
- Current operator: North Western Railway

Route
- Termini: Jaisalmer (JSM); Jaipur Junction (JP)
- Stops: 22
- Distance travelled: 703 km (437 mi)
- Average journey time: 12 hours 50 minutes
- Service frequency: Daily
- Train number: 12467 / 12468

On-board services
- Classes: AC 3 Tier, Sleeper Class, General Unreserved
- Seating arrangements: Yes
- Sleeping arrangements: Yes
- Catering facilities: E-catering
- Observation facilities: Rake sharing with 14703/14704 Jaisalmer–Lalgarh Express
- Baggage facilities: Available
- Other facilities: Below the seats

Technical
- Rolling stock: ICF coach
- Track gauge: 1,676 mm (5 ft 6 in)
- Operating speed: 54.78 km/h (34 mph) average including halts.
Route map
- via Phalodi, Bikaner, Nagaur

The 12467 / 12468 Leelan Express is an express train of the Indian Railways connecting Jaisalmer in Rajasthan and Jaipur Junction of Rajasthan. It is currently being operated with 12467/12468 train numbers on a daily basis.

== Service ==
Although called the Leelan "Superfast" Express, the train in both directions (12467 and 12468) has an average speed of only 55 km/h and takes 12 hrs 40 mins to cover around 698 km.

== Route & halts ==
The important halts of the train are:

- Jaisalmer
- Shri Bhadriya Lathi
- Pokran
- Ramdevra
- Phalodi Junction
- Kolayat
- Lalgarh Junction
- Bikaner Junction
- Deshnoke
- Nokha
- Nagaur
- Marwar Mundwa
- Merta Road Bypass
- Ren
- Degana Junction
- Gachhipura
- Makrana Junction
- Kuchaman City
- Nawa City
- Sambhar Lake Town
- Phulera Junction
- Asalpur Jobner
- Kanakpura
- Jaipur Junction

== Coach composition ==
The train has standard ICF rakes with a maximum speed of 110 kmph. The train consists of 15 coaches.

- 3 III AC class
- 6 Sleeper class
- 4 general
- 2 second-class luggage/parcel van

== Traction ==
Both trains are hauled by an Ghaziabad Loco Shed-based WAP 5 or WAG 9 electric locomotive from Jaisalmer to Jaipur Junction, and vice versa.

Now no reversal as it halts at new station of Merta Road i.e., Merta Road Bypass

== Rake sharing ==
The train shares its rake with 14703/14704 Jaisalmer–Lalgarh Express.

== See also ==
- Pune Junction railway station
- Jaipur Junction railway station
- Jaisalmer–Lalgarh Express
