= Diesel Loco Shed, Abu Road =

Loco shed in Rajasthan, India

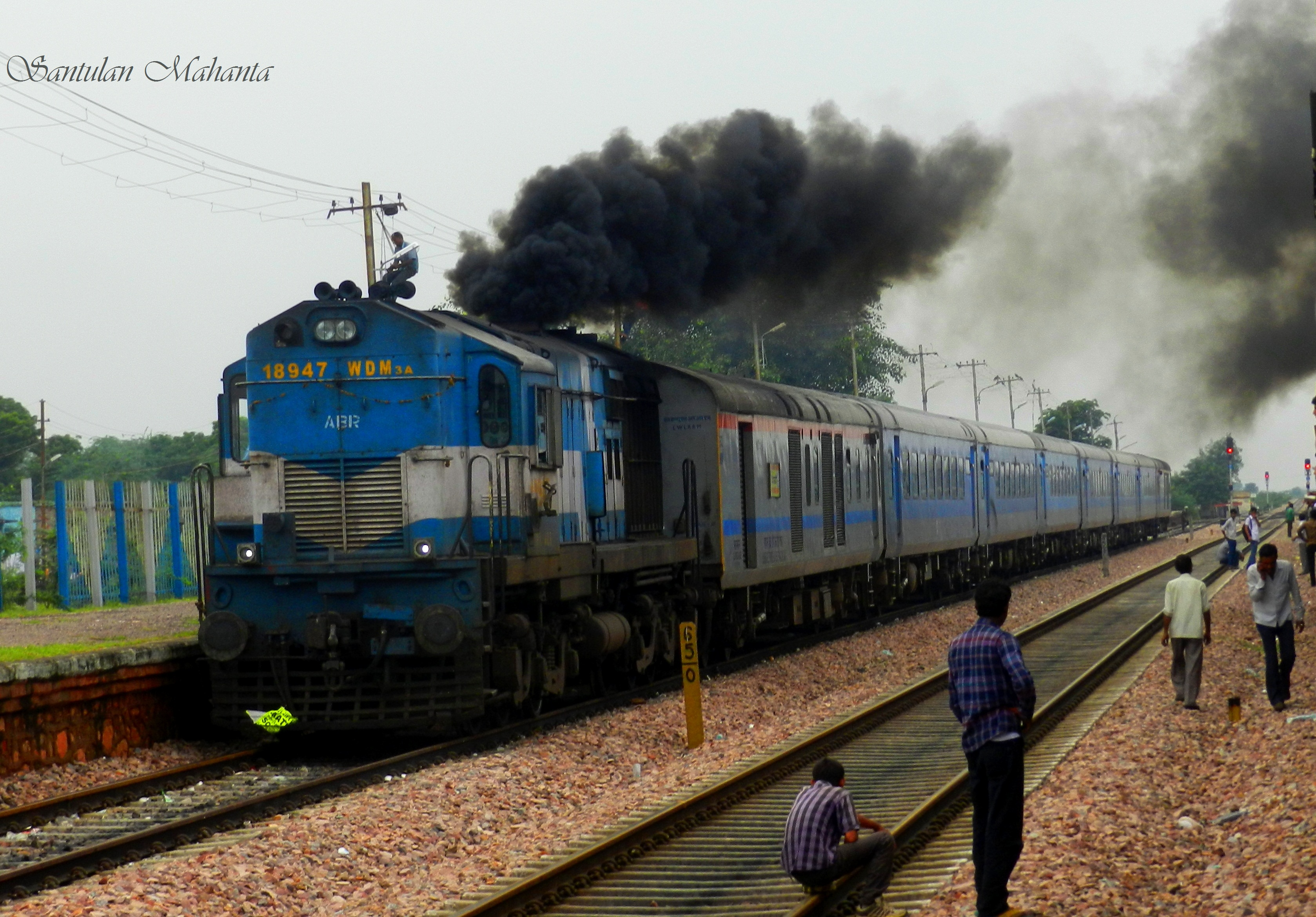
- Abu Road based WDM-3A hauling Jaipur Agra Fort Shatabdi Express.

- Location within Rajasthan

Location
- Location: Abu Road, Rajasthan
- Coordinates: 24°28′51″N 72°47′07″E

Characteristics
- Owner: Indian Railways
- Operator: North Western Railway zone
- Depot code: ABR
- Type: Diesel Locomotives
- Roads: 5
- Rolling stock: WDG-3A; WDM-3A; WDM-3D; WDG-4/4D
- Routes served: North Western Railway, Jaipur-Ahmedabad line

History
- Opened: 26 October 1966; 59 years ago
- Former rolling stock: WDM-2; WDP-4D; WAP-4; WAG-7

Diesel Loco Shed, Abu Road is a motive power depot performing locomotive maintenance and repair facility for diesel locomotives of the Indian Railways, located at Abu Road railway station (ABR) in Abu Road city in the Indian state of Rajasthan. It is one of the two diesel loco sheds of the North Western Railway, the others being at Bhagat ki Kothi.

== History ==
The diesel shed was commissioned on 26 October 1966. It was the biggest Metre Gauge diesel shed of Western Railway at that time with a holding of 112 YDM-4 locomotives. With broad gauge conversion of Mahesana to Ajmer route, conversion of the shed to a broad gauge shed with a holding of 60 locos was planned. The last metre gauge locomotive was given a ceremonial send off on 15 February 1996. The first broad gauge locomotive of the shed was commissioned on 12 April 1997. Since then, the holding rapidly increased to a full capacity of 60 locomotives by March 1998. The 60th locomotive was flagged off 9 March 1998.

WDG-3A locomotives were first commissioned and homed in 1998–99. Work for augmentation of homing capacity of shed from 60 to 120 locomotive was completed in March 2003.

== General information ==
| Commissioning of Shed | 26 October 1966 |
| Conversion of Metre gauge to broad gauge started | 12 April 1997 |
| Conversion completed | 9 March 1998 |
| No.of locomotives in Mail/Express | 50 |
| No.of locomotives in Goods | 41 |
| Total Area of Shed | Approx. 1,10,000 Sq Meters |
| Covered Area | Approx.20,000Sq.Meters |

== Infrastructure ==
| L.R.Bay | 3 Bays of 2.5 loco length with pendant operation overhead crane of 3 tonne capacity |
| New L.R.Bay | 2 Bays of 3 loco length with 5 tonne over head crane. |
| H.R.Bay | One bay of 4 loco length with two 35 Tonne over head crane. |
| Under floor pit wheel lathe | One of HYT make |
| Whiting jack | 1 set of 35 tonne capacity 1set of 25 tonne capacity |
| Forklifter/Lister | 04 nos. |
| Roadcrane | 1 no |
| E.T.P. | Capacity‐ 3000ltrs per hr. |
| Spectrograph M/C | One no. |
| Fuel installation | Two tanks of total 310 KL capacity Installed by IOC |
| Lube oil installation | Three tanks (70KL) of total 210 KL capacity Installed by IOC |
| Incinerator | One incinerator of capacity 100 kg per hour |

== Locomotives ==
| Serial No. | Locomotives | Horsepower | Quantity |
|---|---|---|---|
| 1. | WDG-3A | 3100 | 9 |
| 2. | WDM-3D | 3300 | 13 |
| 3. | WDG-4/4D | 4000/4500 | 110 |
| Total Locomotives Active as of July 2025 | | | 132 |

== Operations ==
Like all locomotive sheds, Abu Road does regular maintenance, overhaul and repair including painting and washing of locomotives. It not only attends to locomotives housed at Abu Road but also to ones coming in from other sheds as well. It has four pit lines for loco repair.

Locomotives of Abu Road shed along with Bhagat ki Kothi shed are the regular links for all trains running through Rajasthan. Abu Road locomotives used to be predominantly the regular links for trains traveling on the North Western Railway zone as well. As more and more railway lines were electrified, ABR started losing links to electric locomotives, mainly WAP1, WAP4, WAG7 and WAP7 locomotives from nearby electric locomotive sheds. The Shed maintains a passenger link of 50 locomotives, which includes among others the prestigious like the Yoga Express & Garib Rath Express, Jaisalmer–Jodhpur Express, Rajasthan Humsafar Express, Fast passengers trains and Link Express trains.

== Livery and markings ==
Indian Railways allows diesel loco sheds to paint their locomotives in their own unique liveries. Abu Road's locomotives have their current livery scheme painted in blue on the top and bottom with a wide white band around the middle. ing Images

== Gallery ==
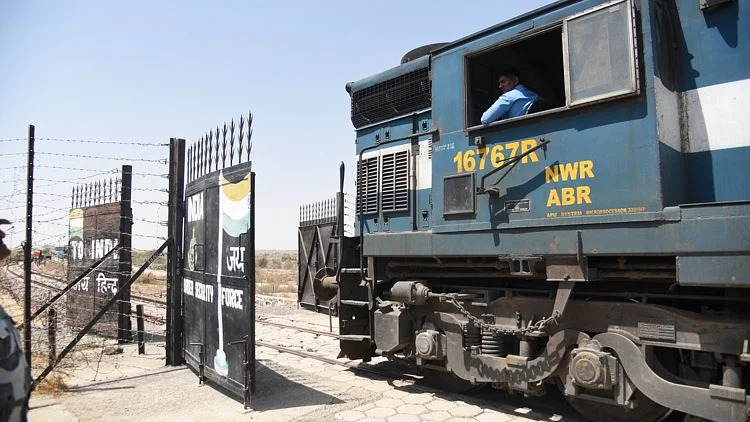
ABR WDM Loco crossing India-Pakistan border

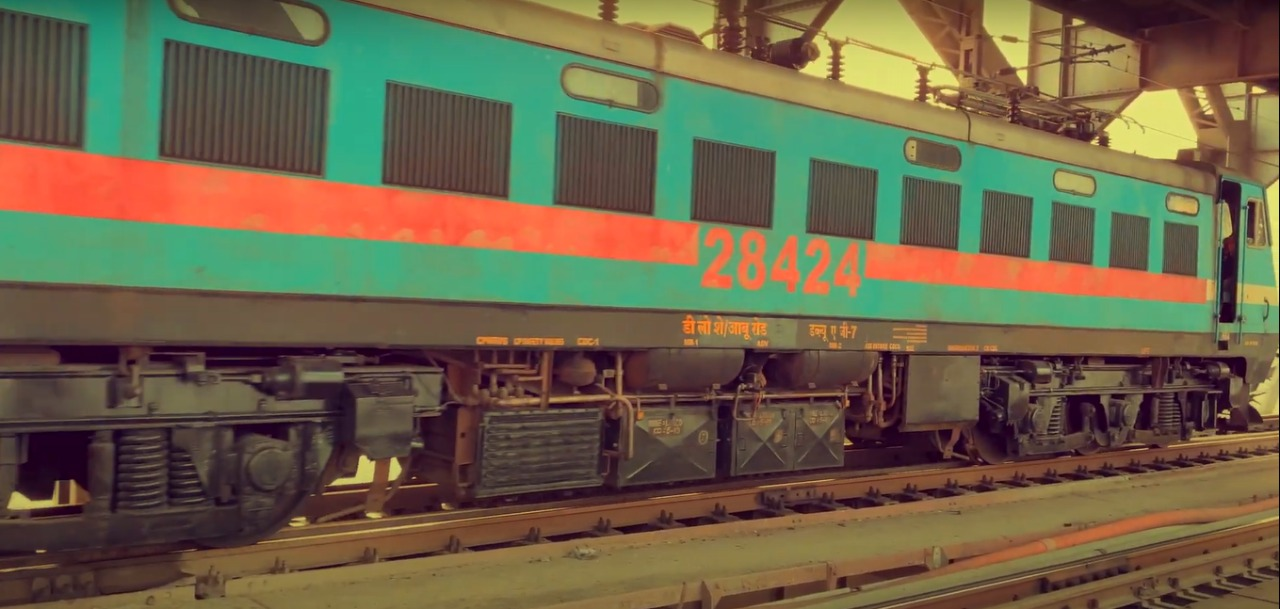
ABR Electric Loco WAG7

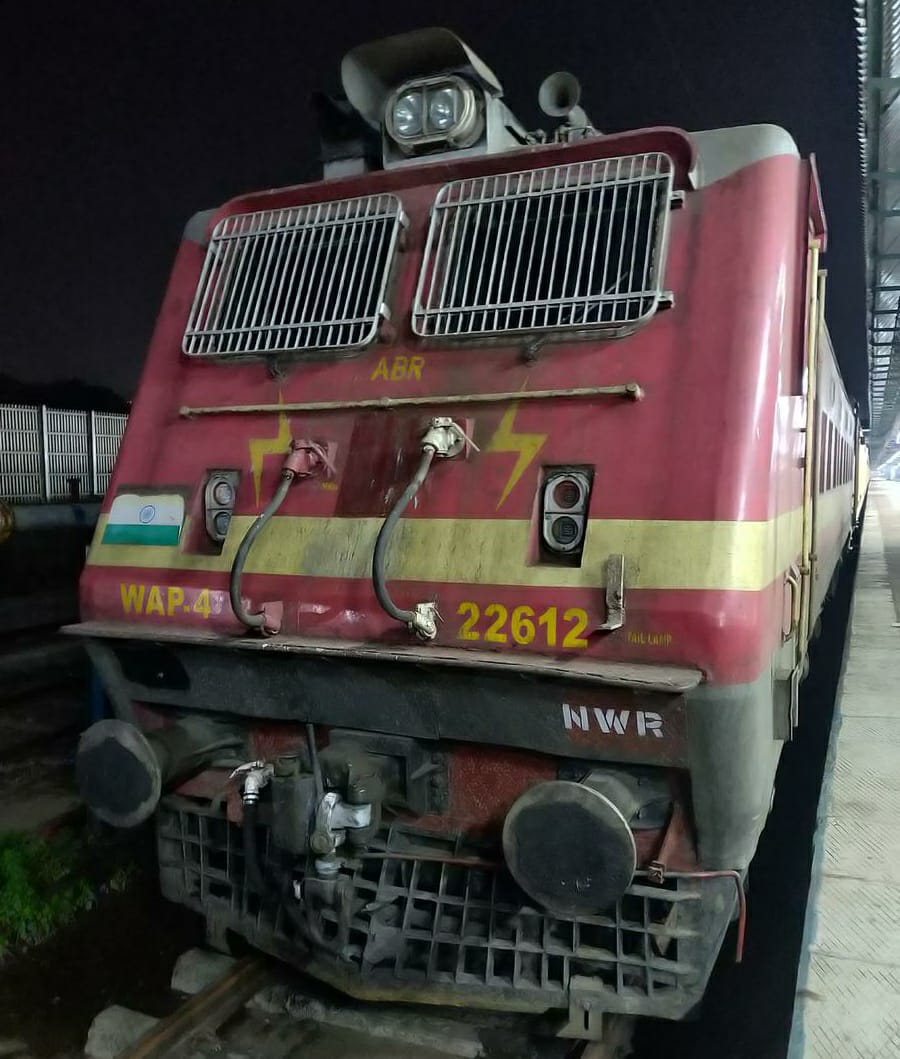
ABR Electric Loco WAP4
