= Pokaran railway station =

Railway station in Pokaran, Rajasthan, India

Pokaran
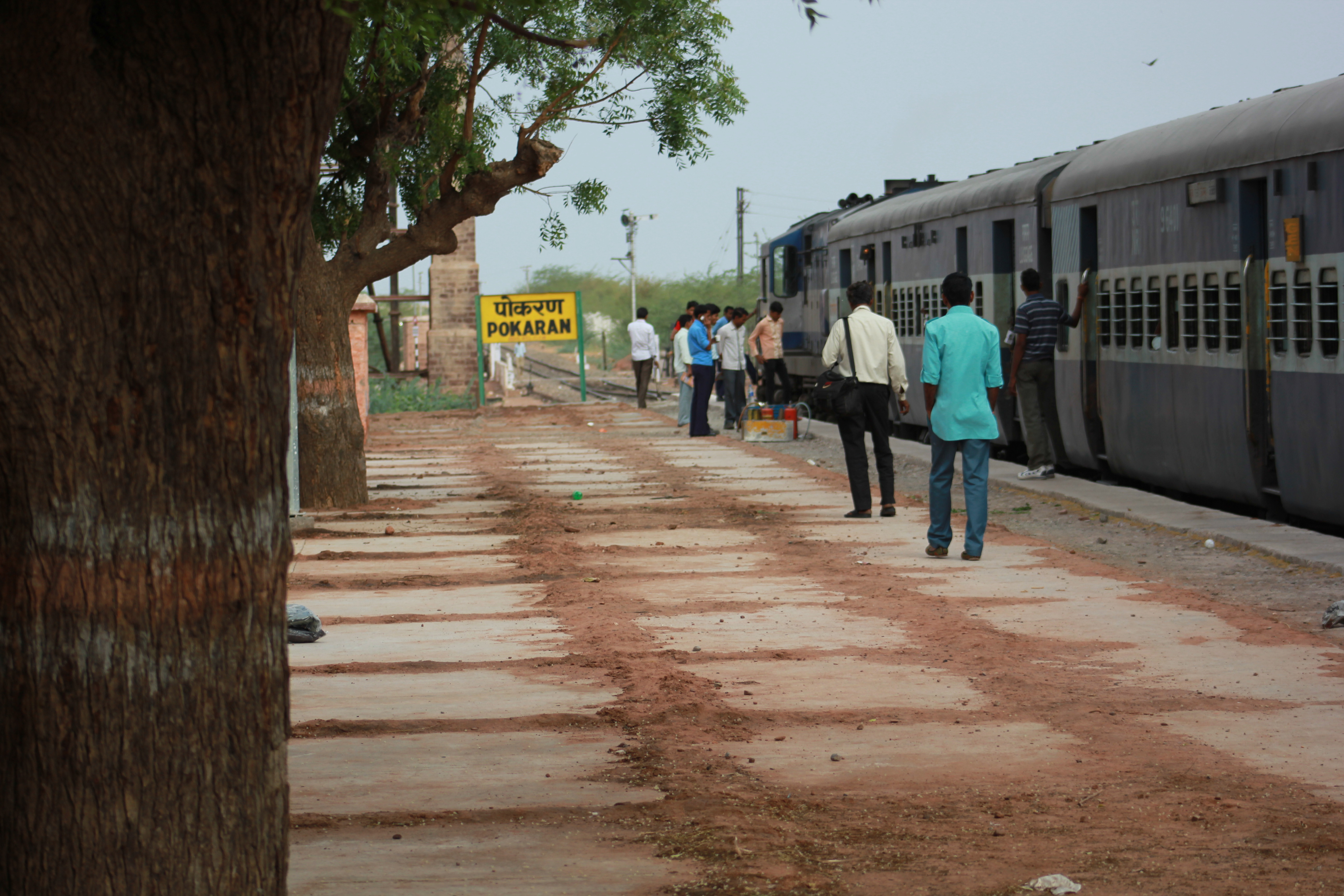

General information
- Location: Pokaran, Rajasthan; India
- Coordinates: 26.9308°N 71.9216°E
- Elevation: 224 m (735 ft)
- System: Regional rail
- Owner: Indian Railways
- Operator: North Western Railway
- Line: Jodhpur–Jaisalmer line
- Platforms: 2
- Tracks: 5
- Connections: Taxi stand, Auto-rickshaw, Bike, Bicycle

Construction
- Structure type: At grade
- Parking: Available

Other information
- Status: Functioning
- Station code: POK
- Zone(s): North Western Railway zone
- Division(s): Jodhpur

History
- Former names: Jodhpur–Bikaner Railway
Location
- Location within Rajasthan Location within India

Pokaran railway station is a major railway station in the North Western Railway zone, located in Pokaran, Rajasthan. Its code is POK.

The railway station is under the administrative control of North Western Railway of Indian Railways. The station consists of two platforms.

In January 2026, the security and railway staff of the station managed to control a fire in one of the coaches of Sabarmati Express.
