= Ranikhet Express =

Train in India

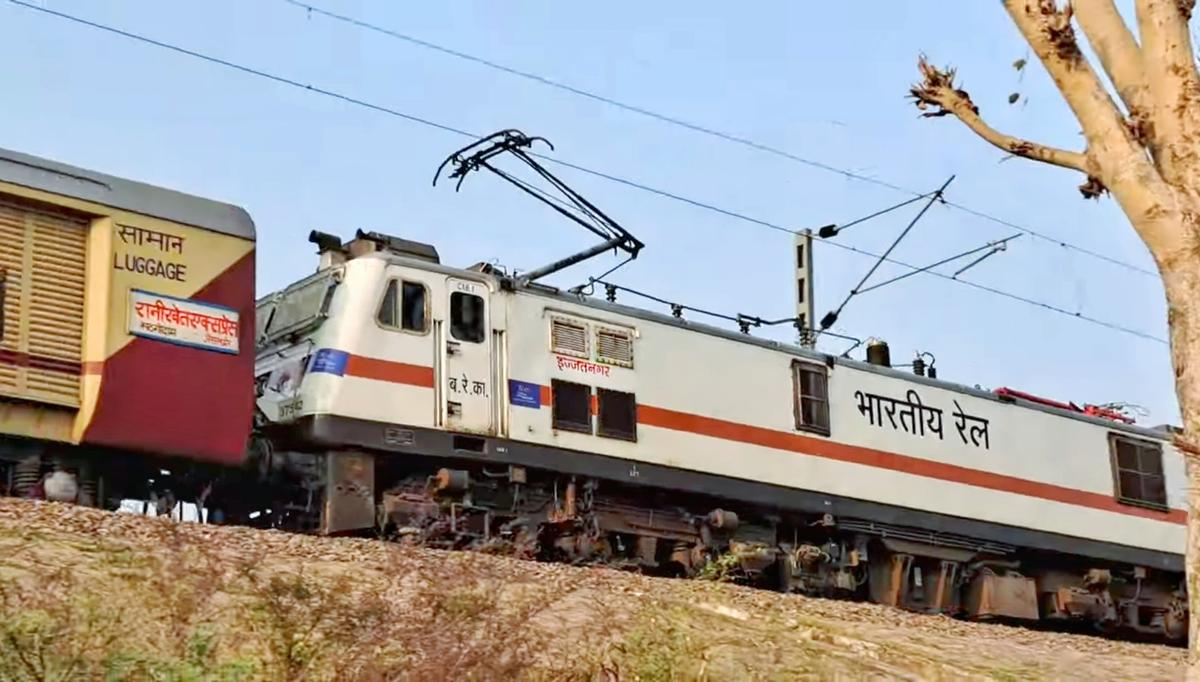
- Ranikhet Express hauled by an Izzatnagar based WAP-7 locomotive.

Overview
- Service type: Express
- Locale: Rajasthan, Haryana, Delhi, Uttar Pradesh & Uttarakhand
- First service: 15 January 2013; 13 years ago
- Current operator: North Eastern Railway

Route
- Termini: Jaisalmer (JSM); Kathgodam (KGM)
- Stops: 38
- Distance travelled: 1,263 km (785 mi)
- Average journey time: 28 hrs 20 mins
- Service frequency: Daily
- Train number: 15013 / 15014

On-board services
- Classes: AC First, AC 2 tier, AC 3 tier, Sleeper Class, General Unreserved
- Seating arrangements: Yes
- Sleeping arrangements: Yes
- Catering facilities: On-board catering, E-catering
- Baggage facilities: Available
- Other facilities: Below the seats

Technical
- Rolling stock: ICF coach
- Track gauge: 1,676 mm (5 ft 6 in)
- Operating speed: 47 km/h (29 mph) average including halts.
Route map
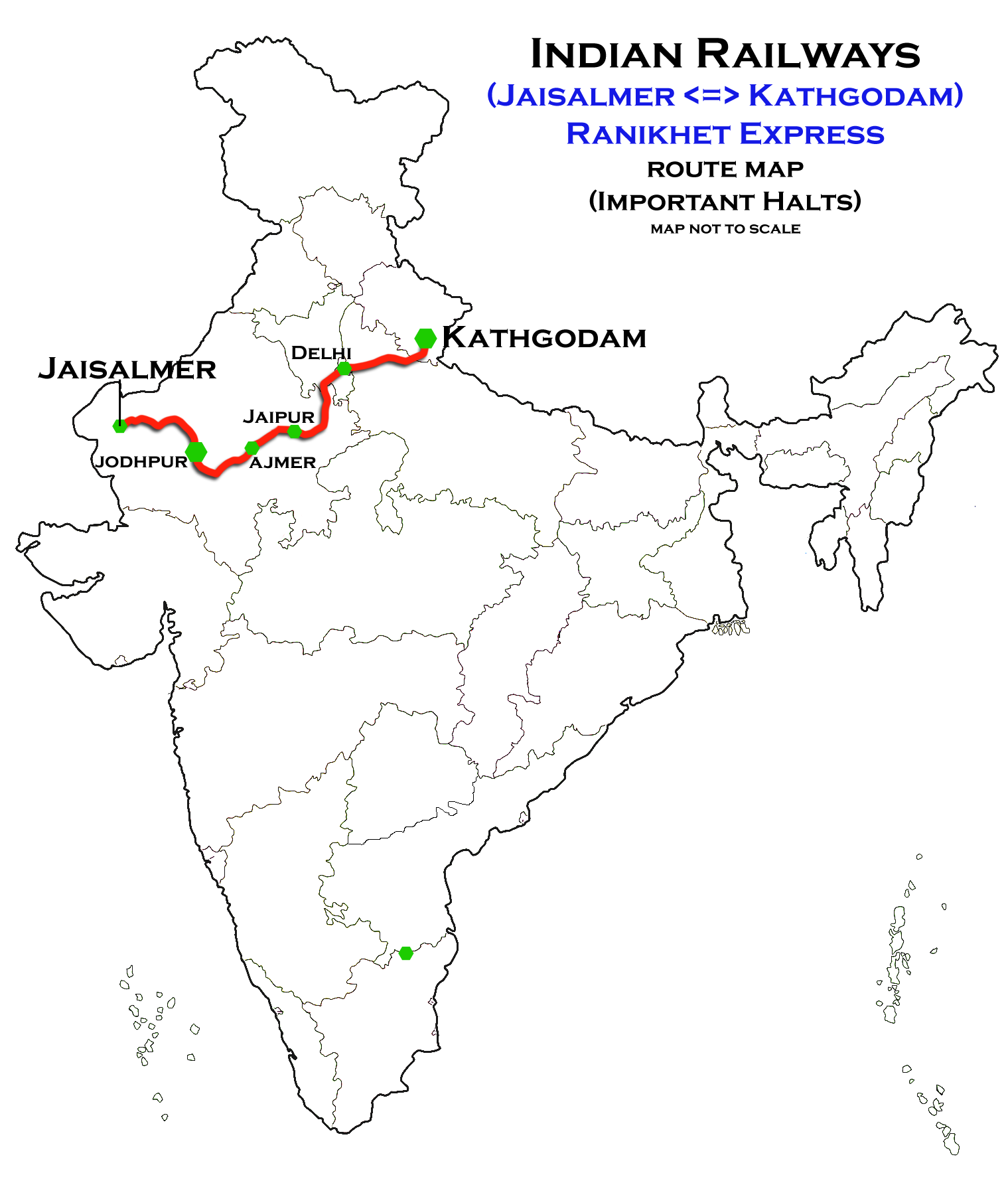

The 15013 / 15014 Ranikhet Express is a Express train belonging to North Eastern Railway zone that runs between Jaisalmer and Kathgodam in India.

The total travel time of this train is 28 hours and 20 mins. It has about 36 halts and covers a distance of over 1263 km at a speed of 42 km/h. This train runs of all days of the week and arrives at platform no. 11 at the Jaisalmer station.

== Route and halts ==
It crosses the states of Rajasthan, Haryana, Delhi, Uttar Pradesh & Uttarakhand.

The train runs from Jaisalmer via Phalodi Junction, Jodhpur Junction, Bhagat Ki Kothi, Marwar Junction, Ajmer Junction, Jaipur Junction, Bandikui Junction, Alwar, Rewari, Gurgaon, Delhi Cantonment, Old Delhi, Ghaziabad, Moradabad, Rampur, Haldwani to Kathgodam.

== Service ==
The 15013 / 15014 Ranikhet Express covers the distance of 1256 kilometres in 28 hours and 05 min. It runs daily from both the side. Inaugural run was on 15 Jan 2013.

No RSA – Rake sharing, Total 3 rakes.

As the average speed of the train is below 45 km/h, as per Indian Railway rules, its fare does not include a Superfast surcharge.

== Traction ==
The train hauled by an Izzatnagar Loco Shed-based WAP-4 and WAP-7 electric locomotive from end to end.

== Coach composition ==
The train has Utkrisht ICF rakes with max speed of 110 kmph.

- 1 AC I Tier
- 2 AC II Tier
- 3 AC III Tier
- 1 AC II Tire + AC III (Hybrid)
- 9 Sleeper coaches
- 5 General
- 3 Second-class Luggage/parcel van

Loco	1	2	3	4	5	6	7	8	9	10	11	12	13	14	15	16	17	18	19	20	21	22	23	24
	GRD	GEN	GEN	A1	A2	H1	B1	B2	S1	S2	S3	S4	S5	S6	S7	GEN	GRD	GEN	S	S	AB	B	GEN	GED

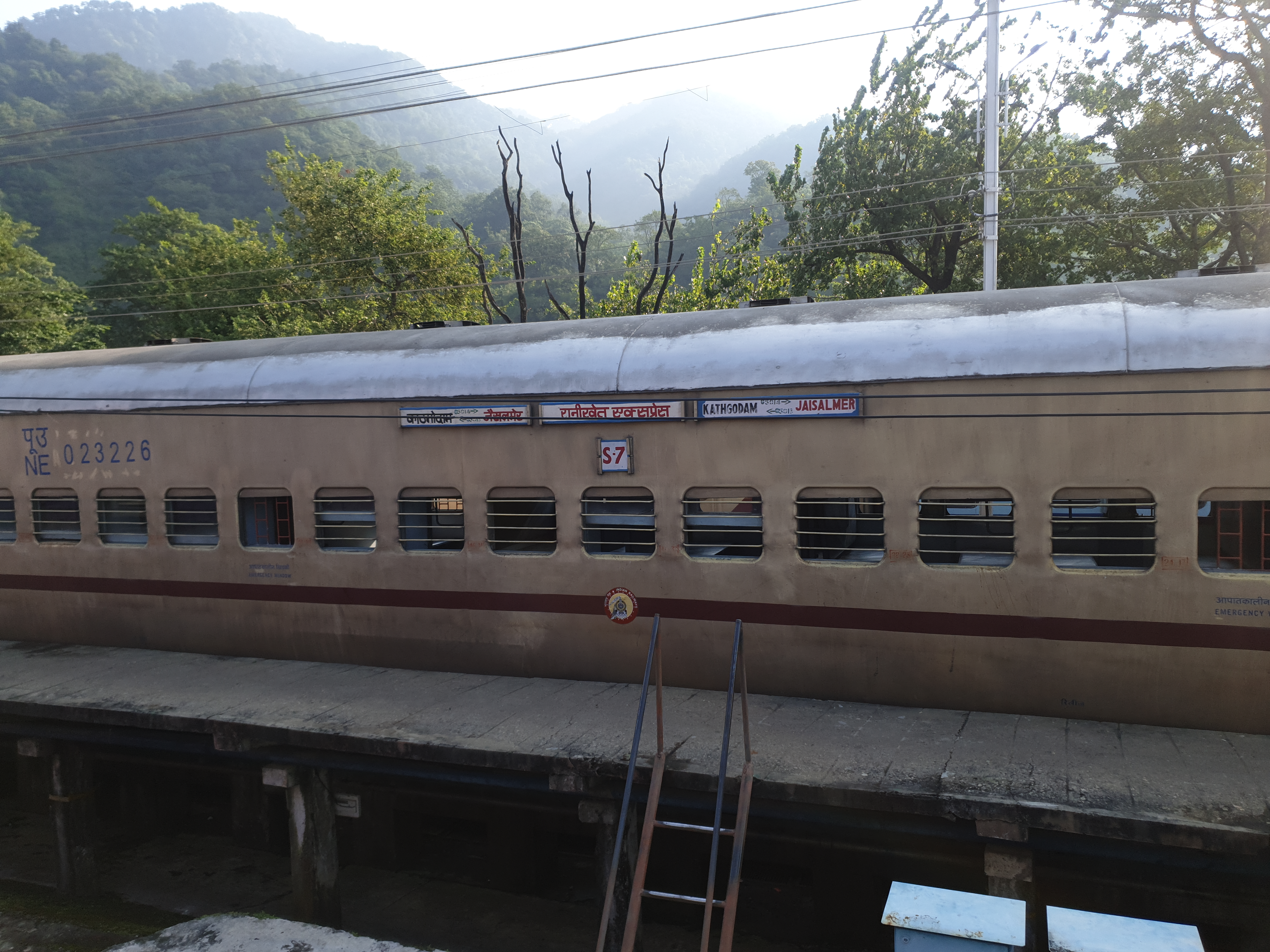
Ranikhet Express standing in Kathgodam Railway Station yard.

Note : – Coach S, AB, and B and 1GENand GRD Splits at Moradabad railway station. Coaches and marked in green colour

== Direction reversal ==
The train reverses its direction at Marwar Junction.

== Schedule ==
Train number	Station code	Departure station	Departure time	Arrival station	Arrival time
15013	JSM	Jaisalmer	Night 12:45 AM	Kathgodam	4:55 AM (next day)
15014	KGM	Kathgodam	8:40 PM	Jaisalmer	11:25 PM (next day)

== See also ==
- Kathgodam railway station
- Jaisalmer railway station
- Jaisalmer City
- Kathgodam City
