= Jodhpur–Jaisalmer line =

Railway route in Rajasthan, India

Jodhpur–Jaisalmer line with Lalgarh branch line
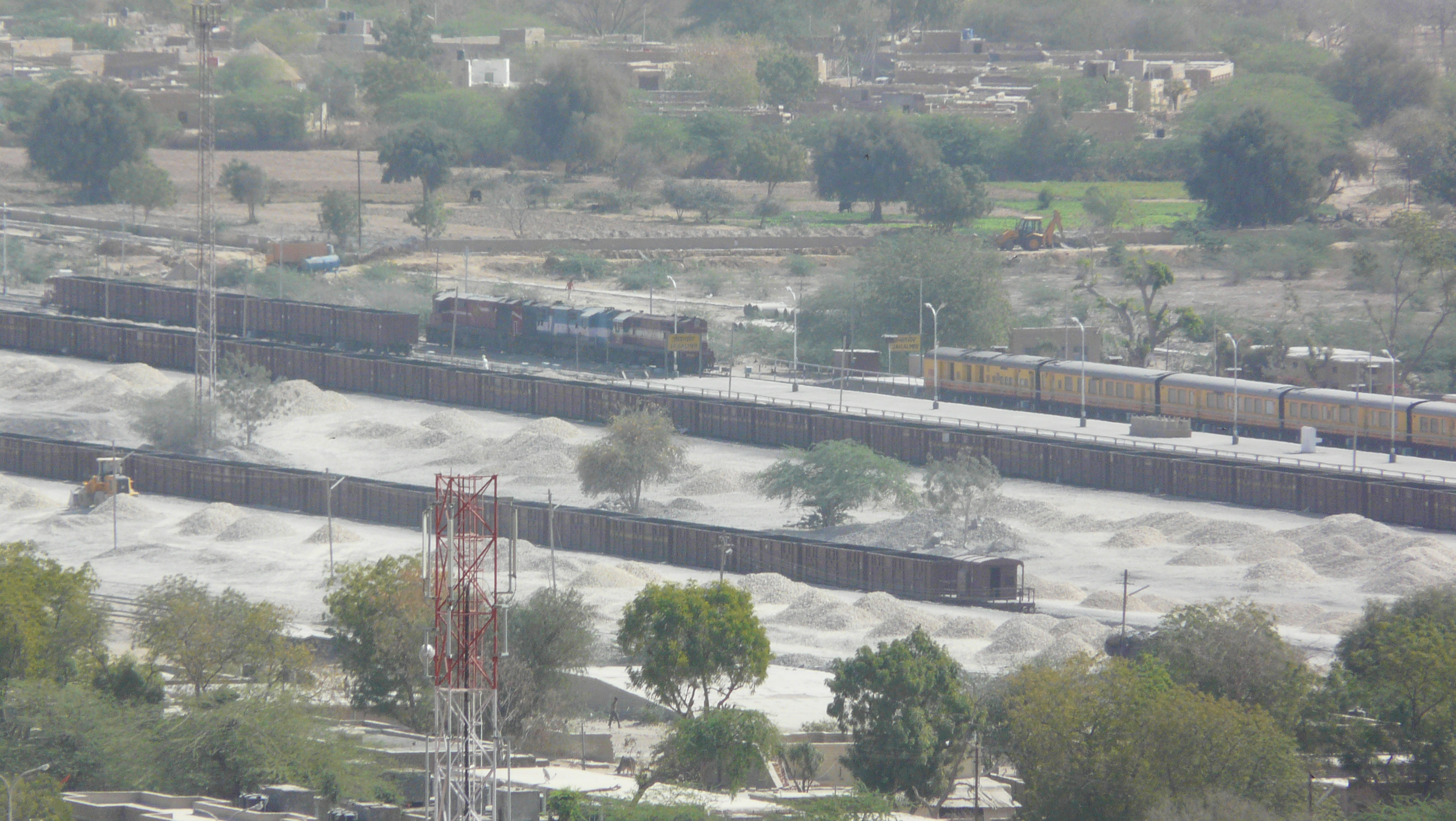
- Palace on Wheels and Goods train on Jaisalmer railway station of Jodhpur–Jaislamer line

Overview
- Status: Operational
- Owner: Indian Railways
- Locale: Rajasthan
- Termini: Jodhpur Junction; Jaisalmer

Service
- Operator(s): North Western Railway

History
- Opened: 1968 (Main line); 30 October 1922 (Lalgarh–Kolayat branch section); 18 June 2007 (Kolayat–Phalodi branch section)

Technical
- Line length: Main line 292 km (181 mi); Phalodi–Lalgarh branch line 158 km (98 mi)
- Track gauge: 1,676 mm (5 ft 6 in) Broad Gauge
- Old gauge: 1,000 mm (3 ft 3 3/8 in) Metre gauge
- Electrification: Yes
- Operating speed: 100 km/h

The Jodhpur–Jaisalmer line or Jaisalmer–Jodhpur line is a railway route on the North Western Railway zone of Indian Railways. This route plays an important role in rail transportation of Bikaner division, Jodhpur division of Rajasthan state.

The corridor passes through the Desert Area of Rajasthan with a stretch of 292 km with consists of one branch line which starts from Phalodi Junction and ends at Lalgarh Junction with a stretch of 158 km.

== History ==
The main railway line from Jodhpur Junction to Phalodi Junction was originally built by Jodhpur–Bikaner Railway company of Bikaner Princely State and Jodhpur Princely State portion as metre-gauge line was constructed on different phases.

- The first phase, from Jodhpur Junction to Osian was opened on 21 September 1913.
- The second phase, from Osian to Marwar Lohawat was opened on 17 March 1914.
- The third phase, from Marwar Lohawat to Phalodi Junction was opened on 12 May 1914.

Whereas, the branch line section from Lalgarh Junction to Kolayat which comes under the Bikaner State Railway was opened on 30 October 1922.

Later the main line was extended to Pokaran from Phalodi Junction on 1940. After it was extended again to Jaisalmer with starting construction in the year 1967 and opened on 1968.

After that, the conversion of main line into 5 ft 6 in (1,676 mm) broad gauge was started in 2003, Which it was important for military purpose because this railway line passes through nearest of International border of India, which was approved in the rail budget 1993–94. was opened on 15 December 2006.

Whereas the branch line section from Lalgarh to Kolayat gauge conversion was done and opened on 23 October 1992, After that the link of branch line section starts from Kolayat to Phalodi Junction was begun survey and construction on 2001 for linking Jaisalmer to Bikaner and other parts of Northern India for military purpose was opened on 18 June 2007.

After that, the new line between Thaiyat Hamira and Sanu was sanctioned on 2013 for easier limestone transport from Sanu Mines to Rest of India, construction was begun on 2015 and after some years it was opened for goods traffic on 1 December 2019.

== Trains passing through this line ==
=== Main ===
- Jaisalmer–Jodhpur Express
- Ranikhet Express
- Corbett Park Link Express

=== Branch ===
- Jaisalmer–Lalgarh Express
- Leelan Express
- Bhavnagar Terminus–Udhampur Janmabhoomi Express
