= Alwar Junction railway station =

Railway station in Rajasthan

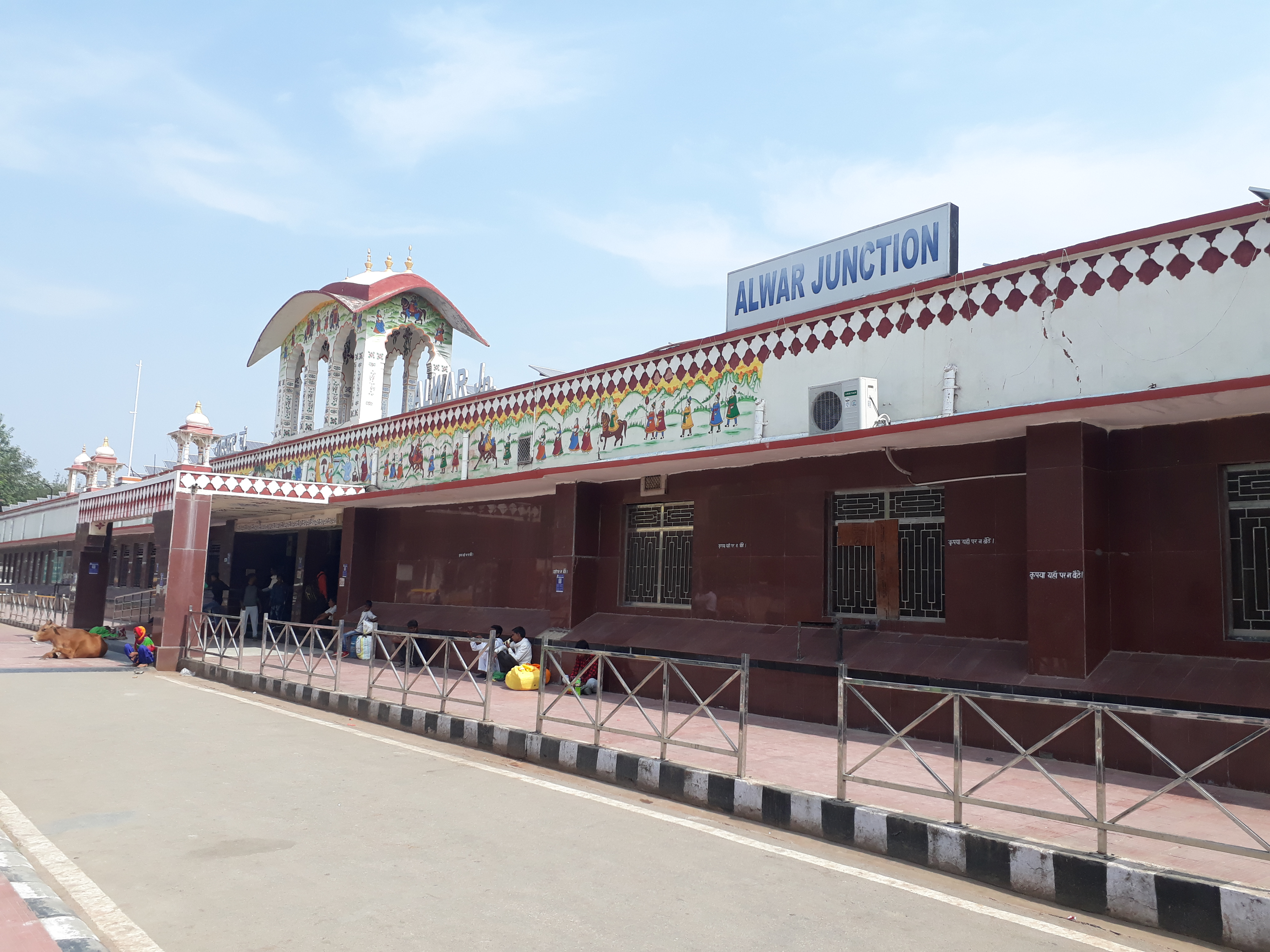

General information
- Location: Alwar, Rajasthan; India
- Coordinates: 27.5605°N 76.6214°E
- Elevation: 271 metres (889 ft)
- System: Indian Railways station
- Owner: Indian Railways
- Operator: North Western Railway
- Lines: New Delhi–Ahmedabad main line, Kota–Rewari railway line, New Delhi–Jaipur main line, Rewari–Mathura line, Alwar–Mathura line
- Platforms: 3
- Tracks: 5
- Connections: Auto stand

Construction
- Structure type: Standard (on-ground station)
- Parking: Yes
- Cycle facilities: Yes

Other information
- Status: Functioning
- Station code: AWR
- Zone(s): North Western Railway
- Division(s): Jaipur

History
- Opened: 1875
- Electrified: Double electric line
Location
- Location within India Location within Rajasthan
- Interactive map

Alwar Junction railway station is a major railway station in Alwar district, Rajasthan. Its code is AWR. It serves Alwar city. The station has three platforms, all of which are covered. Passenger amenities include drinking-water facilities, sanitation services, escalators, waiting rooms, a retiring room, and an IRCTC-operated lounge.

Station is a major railway station on Delhi–Jaipur railway lines. Many trains originates from here.It is administered by the Jaipur division of North Western railway. The railway network connects Alwar with Delhi, Mumbai, Jaipur, Chandigarh, Ahmedabad, Jodhpur, Bikaner, Allahabad, Bandikui, Mathura and other important tourist cities of India.
