= Jodhpur railway station =

Railway station in Rajasthan, India

Jodhpur
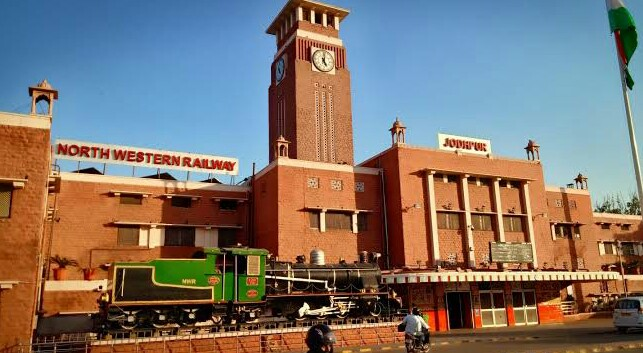

General information
- Location: Jodhpur, Rajasthan; India
- Coordinates: 26°16′59″N 73°01′21″E
- Elevation: 241 m (791 ft)
- System: Express train and Passenger train station
- Owner: Indian Railways
- Operator: North Western Railway zone
- Lines: Jodhpur–Jaisalmer line, Jodhpur–Luni section, Jodhpur–Bathinda line
- Platforms: 5
- Tracks: 7
- Connections: Taxi stand, Autorickshaw

Construction
- Structure type: At grade
- Parking: Available

Other information
- Status: Functioning
- Station code: JU
- Zone(s): North Western Railway Zone
- Division(s): Jodhpur
- Website: https://jodhpurstation.in

History
- Opened: 1885; 141 years ago
Location
- Location within Rajasthan
- Interactive map

Jodhpur railway station (station code:- JU) is a major railway station located in Jodhpur, Rajasthan, India. The railway station is under the administrative control of North Western Railway of Indian Railways.

== History ==
Jodhpur railway station was opened in 1885 under the jurisdiction of New Jodhpur Railway The first train ran from Jodhpur to Luni on 9 March 1885. The New Jodhpur Railway was later combined with Bikaner State Railway to form Jodhpur–Bikaner Railway in 1889 A Railway line was completed between Jodhpur and Bikaner in 1891, Later in 1900, lt combined with Jodhpur–Hyderabad Railway (some part of this railway is in Pakistan) leading to connection with Hyderabad of Sindh Province. Later in 1924 Jodhpur and Bikaner Railways worked as independent Railways. After Independence, a part of Jodhpur Railway went to West Pakistan.

== Railway reorganization ==
Jodhpur–Bikaner line was merged with the Western Railway on 5 November 1951. Later North Western Railway came into existence on 1 October 2002.
