= Jodhpur railway division =

Railway division of India

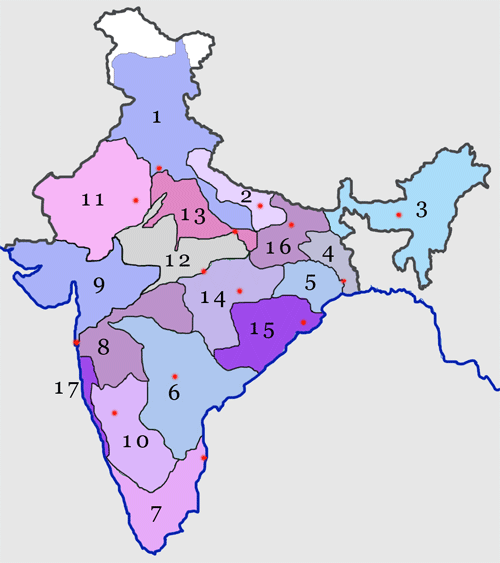
- 11-North Western Railway

Overview
- Headquarters: Jodhpur Junction railway station
- Locale: Rajasthan
- Dates of operation: 1951; 75 years ago–
- Predecessor: Northern Railway zone

Technical
- Track gauge: Mixed

Other
- Website: www.nwr.indianrailways.gov.in

Jodhpur railway division is one of the four railway divisions under the jurisdiction of North Western Railway zone of the Indian Railways. This railway division was formed on 5 November 1951 as a part of Northern Railway zone and its headquarters are located at Jodhpur in the state of Rajasthan of India.

Jaipur railway division, Bikaner railway division and Ajmer railway division are the other three railway divisions under NWR Zone headquartered at Jaipur.

== Rail transport infrastructure ==
The zone has the following types of locomotive engines: (Legends: W - broad gauge, D - diesel, G - goods, M - mixed, P - passenger)

- Bhagat Ki Kothi railway station (BGKT) sheds at Jodhpur: WDM2, WDG's, WDP4's, WDM3A's

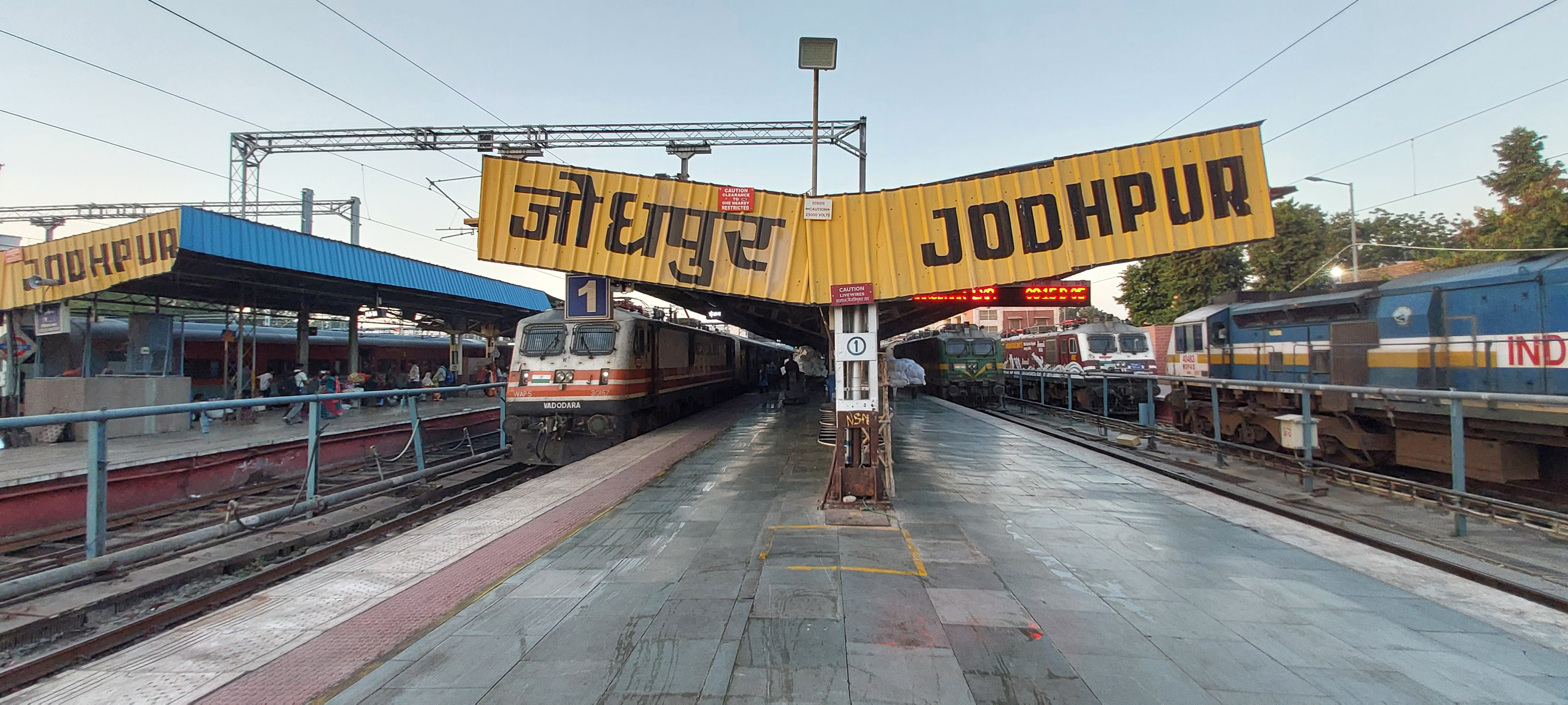
Jodhpur railway station

== Medical Facilities ==
For the employees and their families, the division also has the following healthcare facilities:

- Zonal Hospitals
  - Jaipur Zonal Railway Hospital near Jaipur Junction railway station
- Divisional Hospitals
  - Jodhpur Divisional Railway Hospital near Jodhpur Junction railway station
- Sub-Divisional Hospitals
  - Udaipur Sub-Divisional Railway Hospital near Rana Pratap Nagar railway station at Udaipur (Jodhpur division)
- Health Units, several (total 29 across the whole division, including 3 other zones)
- First Aid Posts, unknown (no more than a total of two across the whole zone)

== Training ==
The zone has the following training institutes:

1. Divisional Training Centre(Engineering), Jodhpur
2. Carriage & Wagon Training Centre, Jodhpur
3. Diesel Traction Training Centre, Bhagat Ki Kothi, Jodhpur
4. Personnel Training Centre, Jodhpur
5. Transportation Training Centre, Jodhpur
6. Basic Training Centre, Jodhpur

== Route and Track Length ==
- North Western Railway zone
  - Route km: broad gauge 2,575.03 kilometres (1,600.05 mi), metre gauge 2,874.23 kilometres (1,785.96 mi), total 5,449.29 kilometres (3,386.03 mi)
  - Track km: broad gauge 6,696.36 kilometres (4,160.93 mi), metre gauge 733.44 kilometres (455.74 mi), total 7,329.80 kilometres (4,554.53 mi)
  - Jodhpur railway division
    - Route km: broad gauge 1,568.42 kilometres (974.57 mi)1,568 km, metre gauge 0 km, total 1,568.42 kilometres (974.57 mi)
    - Track km: broad gauge 1,979.73 kilometres (1,230.15 mi), metre gauge 0 km, total 1,979.73 kilometres (1,230.15 mi)

== List of railway stations and towns ==
The list includes the stations under the Jodhpur railway division and their station category.

Category of station	No. of stations	Names of stations
A-1	1	Jodhpur Junction
A	4	Barmer, Nagaur, Pali Marwar, Jaisalmer
B	-	-
C suburban station	-	-Dhanera
D	-	-
E	-	-
F halt station	-	-
Total	-	-

Stations closed for Passengers -
