= MGR Chennai Central–Bhagat Ki Kothi Superfast Express =

Train in India

Chennai - Bhagat Ki Kothi Superfast Express
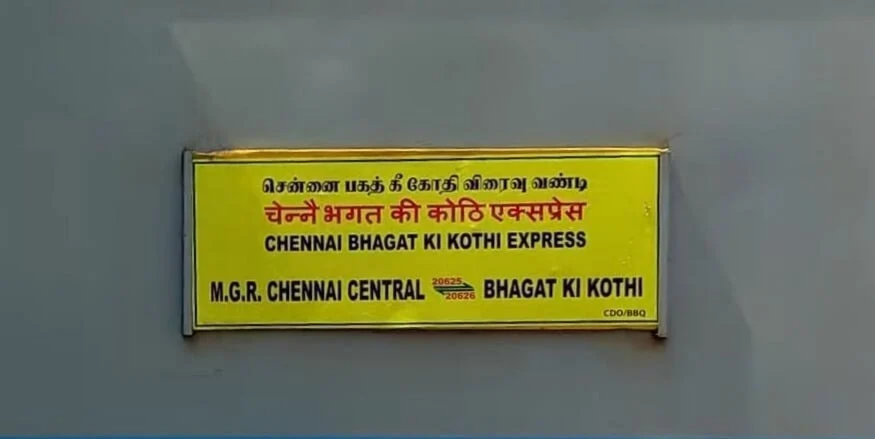

Overview
- Service type: Superfast
- Status: Active
- Locale: Tamil Nadu, Andhra Pradesh, Telangana, Maharashtra, Gujarat & Rajasthan
- First service: 3 May 2025; 14 months ago
- Current operator: Southern Railway (SR)

Route
- Termini: Chennai Central (MAS); Bhagat Ki Kothi (BGKT)
- Stops: 30
- Distance travelled: 2,351 km (1,461 mi)
- Average journey time: 40h 30m
- Service frequency: Weekly (Note: Runs five day in a week for every direction.)
- Train number: 20625 / 20626

On-board services
- Classes: AC 2 tier, AC 3 tier, AC 3rd tier Economy, Sleeper class, General Unreserved
- Seating arrangements: Yes
- Sleeping arrangements: Yes
- Catering facilities: On-board Catering E-catering
- Observation facilities: Large windows
- Baggage facilities: No
- Other facilities: Below the seats

Technical
- Rolling stock: LHB coach
- Track gauge: 1,676 mm (5 ft 6 in)
- Operating speed: 58 km/h (36 mph) average including halts.

The 20625 / 20626 Chennai Central–Bhagat Ki Kothi Superfast Express is an Superfast Express train belonging to Southern Railway zone that runs between Chennai Central and Bhagat Ki Kothi in India.

== Schedule ==
• 20625 - 7:35 PM [Chennai Central]

• 20626 - 5:30 AM [Bhagat Ki Kothi]

Running Days :

A) 20625 :

1. Sunday
2. Monday
3. Tuesday
4. Thursday
5. Friday

B) 20626 :

1. Sunday
2. Monday
3. Wednesday
4. Thursday
5. Friday

== Routes and halts ==
The Important Halts of the train are :

● MGR Chennai Central

● Sullurupeta

● Gudur Junction

● Nellore

● Ongole

● Vijayawada Junction

● Khammam

● Warangal

● Balharshah

● Chandrapur

● Wardha Junction

● Dhamangaon

● Badnera Junction

● Akola Junction

● Malkapur

● Bhusaval Junction

● Jalgaon Junction

● Nandurbar

● Udhna Junction

● Bharuch Junction

● Vadodara Junction

● Sabarmati Junction

● Mahesana Junction

● Bhildi Junction

● Raniwara . Dhanera ● Marwar Bhinmal

● Jalor

● Samdari Junction

● Luni Junction

● Bhagat Ki Kothi

== Traction ==
As the entire route is fully electrified it is hauled by a Royapuram & Erode Loco Shed-based WAP-7 electric locomotive from Chennai Central to Bhagat Ki Kothi and vice versa.

== Rake reversal ==
There is no rake reversal or rake share.

== See also ==
Trains from Chennai Central :

1. Chennai–Hazrat Nizamuddin Duronto Express
2. Chennai Central–Mysore Shatabdi Express
3. Grand Trunk Express
4. Chennai Central–Vijayawada Jan Shatabdi Express
5. Lokmanya Tilak Terminus–Chennai Central Weekly Express

Trains from Bhagat Ki Kothi :

1. Bhagat Ki Kothi–Ahmedabad Weekly Express
2. Bhagat Ki Kothi–Sabarmati Intercity Express
3. Bhagat Ki Kothi–Bilaspur Express
4. Bhagat Ki Kothi–Bandra Terminus Express (via Bhildi)
5. Bhagat Ki Kothi–Pune Express
