= Jodhpur–Dadar Express =

Indian express train

Overview
- Service type: Express
- First service: 22 July 2013; 12 years ago
- Current operator: North Western Railway zone

Route
- Termini: Jodhpur (JU); Dadar (DDR)
- Stops: 20
- Distance travelled: 947 km (588 mi)
- Average journey time: 17h 30m
- Service frequency: Three days per week (Note: Runs three days per week for each direction.)
- Train number: 14807/14808

On-board services
- Classes: AC 2 tier, AC 3 tier, Sleeper class, General Unreserved
- Seating arrangements: No
- Sleeping arrangements: Yes
- Catering facilities: On-board catering E-catering
- Observation facilities: ICF coach
- Entertainment facilities: No
- Baggage facilities: No
- Other facilities: Below the seats

Technical
- Rolling stock: 2
- Track gauge: 1,676 mm (5 ft 6 in)
- Operating speed: 52 km/h (32 mph), including hal

The Jodhpur–Dadar Express is an Express train belonging to North Western Railway zone that runs between Jodhpur and Dadar in India. It operates with 14807/14808 train numbers on a daily basis.

== Service ==
The 14807/Jodhpur–Dadar Express has an average speed of 52 km/h and covers 947 km in 17h 30m. The 14808/Dadar–Jodhpur Express has an average speed of 44 km/h and covers 947 km in 18h 25m.

== Route and halts ==
The important halts of the train are:

- Jodhpur
- Bhagat Ki Kothi
- Samdari Junction
- Mokalsar
- Jalor
- Modran
- Marwar Bhinmal
- Raniwara
- Dhanera
- Bhildi Junction
- Patan
- Mahesana Junction
- Sabarmati Junction
- Ahmedabad Junction
- Vadodara Junction
- Bharuch Junction
- Surat
- Vapi
- Borivali
- Dadar

== Coach composition ==
The train has standard ICF rakes with a maximum speed of 110 kmph. The train consists of 16 coaches:

- 1 Chair Car
- 13 General Unreserved
- 2 Seating cum Luggage Rake

== Traction ==
Both trains are hauled by a Ratlam Loco Shed-based WDM-3A diesel locomotive from Jaipur to Alwar and vice versa.

== Rake sharing ==
The train shares its rake with

- 54809/54810 Rewari–Jodhpur Passenger
- 54835/54836 Jaipur–Hisar Passenger
- 54833/54834 Hisar–Rewari Passenger

== See also ==
- Alwar Junction railway station
- Jammu Tawi railway station
- Rewari–Jodhpur Passenger
- Jaipur–Hisar Passenger
- Hisar–Rewari Passenger
