= Jaisalmer–Sabarmati Intercity Express =

Train in India

Jaisalmer–Sabarmati Superfast Express

Overview
- Service type: Superfast Express
- First service: 8 October 2019; 6 years ago
- Current operator: North Western Railway

Route
- Termini: Jaisalmer (JSM); Sabarmati (SBIB)
- Stops: 17
- Distance travelled: 750 km (466 mi)
- Average journey time: 13 hours 30 minutes
- Service frequency: Daily
- Train number: 20485 / 20486

On-board services
- Classes: AC 2 Tier, AC 3 Tier, Sleeper Class, General Unreserved
- Seating arrangements: Yes
- Sleeping arrangements: Yes
- Catering facilities: On-board catering, E-catering
- Observation facilities: Large windows
- Baggage facilities: No
- Other facilities: Below the seats

Technical
- Rolling stock: LHB coach
- Track gauge: 1,676 mm (5 ft 6 in)
- Operating speed: 56 km/h (35 mph) average including halts.

The 20485 / 20486 Jaisalmer–Sabarmati Superfast Express is an superfast express train belonging to North Western Railway zone that runs between Sabarmati Junction and Jaisalmer in India. It is currently being operated with 20485/20486 train numbers on a daily basis.

== Service ==
- 20485/Jaisalmer–Sabarmati Superfast Express has an average speed of 56 km/h and covers 750 km in 13 hrs 30 mins.
- 20496/Sabarmati–Jaisalmer Superfast Express has an average speed of 56 km/h and covers 750 km in 13 hrs 30 mins.

== Schedule ==
Train number	Departure station	Departure time	Departure day	Arrival station	Arrival time	Arrival day
20485	Jaisalmer	06:30	Daily	Sabarmati	20:00	Daily
20486	Sabarmati	07:00	Daily	Jaisalmer	20:30	Daily

== Route & halts ==
- Jaisalmer
- Phalodi Junction
- Jodhpur
- Bhagat Ki Kothi
- Luni Junction
- Samdari Junction
- Mokalsar
- Jalor
- Modran
- Marwar Bhinmal
- Raniwara
- Dhanera
- Bhildi Junction
- Patan
- Mahesana Junction
- Sabarmati

== Coach composition ==
The train has LHB rakes and PM of rakes is done at Jaisalmer. The train consists of 22 coaches:

- 1 AC First Class
- 5 AC 2 Tier
- 1 AC 3 Tier Economy
- 2 Second Chair Car
- 7 Sleeper Class
- 4 General Unreserved
- 2 EoG cum SLR

== Traction ==
Both trains are hauled by an Bhagat Ki Kothi Loco Shed-based WAP-7 electric locomotive from Sabarmati to Jodhpur and vice versa.

== See also ==
- Bhagat Ki Kothi railway station
- Sabarmati railway station
- Dhanera railway station
