= Disa railway station =

Railway station in Gujarat, India

Disa

General information
- Location: Disa, Gujarat; India
- Coordinates: 24°14′14″N 72°10′47″E
- Elevation: 140 metres (460 ft)
- System: Indian Railways station
- Owner: Ministry of Railways, Indian Railways
- Operator: Western Railway
- Line: Gandhidham–Palanpur section
- Platforms: 2
- Tracks: 5

Construction
- Structure type: Standard (on ground)
- Parking: No

Other information
- Status: Functioning
- Station code: DISA
- Zone(s): Western Railway
- Division(s): Ahmedabad
Location
- Location within India Location within Gujarat

Disa railway station is a railway station in Banaskantha district, Gujarat, India on the Western line of the Western Railway network. Disa railway station is 27 km far away from Palanpur Junction. Passenger, Express and Superfast trains halt here.

Lorwada is nearest railway station towards Gandhidham Junction, whereas Chandisar is nearest railway station towards Palanpur Junction.

== Major trains ==
Following Express and Superfast trains halt at Disa railway station in both direction:

- 19151/52 Palanpur–Bhuj Intercity Express
- 14805/06 Yesvantpur–Barmer AC Express
- 14803/04 Bhagat Ki Kothi–Ahmedabad Weekly Express
- 14321/22 Ala Hazrat Express (via Bhildi)
- 12959/60 Dadar–Bhuj Superfast Express
