= Adesar railway station =

Railway station in Gujarat, India

Adesar railway station

General information
- Location: Adesar, Gujarat; India
- Coordinates: 23°33′09″N 70°58′21″E
- Elevation: 35 metres (115 ft)
- System: Indian Railways station
- Owner: Ministry of Railways, Indian Railways
- Operator: Western Railway
- Line: Gandhidham–Palanpur section
- Platforms: 1
- Tracks: 1

Construction
- Structure type: Standard (on ground)
- Parking: No

Other information
- Status: Functioning
- Station code: AAR
- Zone(s): Western Railway
- Division(s): Ahmedabad
Location
- Location within India Location within Gujarat

Adesar railway station is a railway station in Kutch district, Gujarat, India on the Western line of the Western Railway network. Adesar railway station is 168 km (104 mi) far away from Bhuj. One Passenger, one Express and one Superfast trains halt here.

== Nearby stations ==
Bhutakiya Bhimasar is nearest railway station towards Gandhidham Junction, whereas Lakhpat is nearest railway station towards Palanpur Junction.

== Major trains ==
Following Express and Superfast trains halt at Adesar railway station:

- 12959/60 Dadar–Bhuj Superfast Express
- 19151/52 Palanpur–Bhuj Intercity Express
