= Santalpur railway station =

Railway station in Gujarat, India

Santalpur

General information
- Location: Santalpur, Gujarat; India
- Coordinates: 23°45′35″N 71°10′56″E
- Elevation: 16 metres (52 ft)
- System: Indian Railways station
- Owner: Ministry of Railways, Indian Railways
- Operator: Western Railway
- Line: Gandhidham–Palanpur section
- Platforms: 2
- Tracks: 2

Construction
- Structure type: Standard (on ground)
- Parking: No

Other information
- Status: Functioning
- Station code: SNLR
- Zone(s): Western Railway
- Division(s): Ahmedabad
Location
- Location within India Location within Gujarat

Santalpur railway station is a railway station in Patan district, Gujarat, India on the Western line of the Western Railway network. Santalpur railway station is 157 km far away from Palanpur Junction. One Passenger, two Express, and one Superfast trains halt here.

== Nearby stations ==
Garmadi is the nearest railway station towards Gandhidham Junction, whereas Chhansara is the nearest railway station towards Palanpur Junction.

== Major trains ==
The following Express and Superfast trains halt at Santalpur railway station in both directions:

- 12959/60 Dadar–Bhuj Superfast Express
- 19151/52 Palanpur–Bhuj Intercity Express
- 14321/22 Ala Hazrat Express (via Bhildi)
