= Diyodar railway station =

Railway station in Gujarat, India

Diyodar

General information
- Location: Diyodar, Gujarat; India
- Coordinates: 24°06′45″N 71°46′10″E
- Elevation: 55 metres (180 ft)
- System: Indian Railways station
- Owner: Ministry of Railways, Indian Railways
- Operator: Western Railway
- Line: Gandhidham–Palanpur section
- Platforms: 2
- Tracks: 1

Construction
- Structure type: Standard (on ground)
- Parking: No

Other information
- Status: Functioning
- Station code: DEOR
- Zone(s): Western Railway
- Division(s): Ahmedabad
Location
- Location within India Location within Gujarat

Diyodar railway station is a railway station in Banaskantha district, Gujarat, India on the Western line of the Western Railway network. It serves Diyodar town. Its station code is 'DEOR'. Diyodar railway station is 71 km away from Palanpur Junction. Passenger, Express, and Superfast trains halt here.

== Nearby stations ==
Mitha is the nearest railway station towards Gandhidham Junction, whereas Dhanakwada is the nearest railway station towards Palanpur Junction.

== Trains ==
The following Express and Superfast trains halt at Diyodar railway station in both directions:

- 19151/52 Palanpur–Bhuj Intercity Express
- 14321/22 Ala Hazrat Express (via Bhildi)
- 12959/60 Dadar–Bhuj Superfast Express
