= Rishikesh–Barmer Express =

Train in India

Overview
- Service type: Express
- Locale: Uttarakhand, Uttar Pradesh, Haryana, Punjab & Rajasthan
- Current operator: North Western Railway

Route
- Termini: Rishikesh (RKSH); Barmer (BME)
- Stops: 40
- Distance travelled: 1,190 km (739 mi)
- Average journey time: 24hrs 10mins
- Service frequency: Daily (Note: Runs seven days in a week for every direction.)
- Train number: 14887 / 14888

On-board services
- Classes: AC 3 tier, Sleeper class, General Unreserved
- Seating arrangements: No
- Sleeping arrangements: Yes
- Catering facilities: On-board catering, E-catering
- Observation facilities: Large windows
- Baggage facilities: No
- Other facilities: Below the seats

Technical
- Rolling stock: LHB coach
- Track gauge: 1,676 mm (5 ft 6 in)
- Operating speed: 49.24 km/h (31 mph) average including halts.

The 14887 / 14888 Rishikesh–Barmer Express is an Express train belonging to North Western Railway zone that runs between Rishikesh and Barmer in India. It is currently being operated with 14887/14888 train numbers on a daily basis.

== Service ==
The 14887 (Rishikesh–Barmer Express) and 14888 (Barmer–Rishikesh Express) trains take a full day, 24h 10m to be precise, to cover their 1190 km journey at an average speed of only 50 km/h.

== Route & halts ==
The important halts of the train are:

- Rishikesh
- Haridwar
- Roorkee
- Saharanpur Junction
- Ambala Cantonment Junction
- Ambala City
- Rajpura Junction
- Patiala
- Dhuri Junction
- Bathinda Cantonment
- Bathinda Junction
- Hanumangarh Junction
- Suratgarh Junction
- Lalgarh Junction
- Bikaner Junction
- Nagaur
- Merta Road Junction
- Jodhpur Junction
- Luni Junction
- Samdari Junction
- Balotra
- Barmer

== Coach composition ==
The train has LHB rakes with max speed of 130 kmph. The train consists of 17 coaches:

- 6 AC III Tier
- 5 Sleeper coaches
- 4 General Unreserved
- 2 Seating cum Luggage Rake.

== Traction ==
Both trains are hauled by a Ludhiana Loco Shed-based WDP-4D diesel locomotive from Rishikesh to Bathinda Junction. From Bathinda Junction it is hauled by a Bhagat Ki Kothi Loco Shed-based WDP-4B / WDP-4D diesel locomotive until Barmer and vice versa.

== Rake sharing ==
The train shares its rake with 14815/14816 Shri Ganganagar–Rishikesh Express.

== Direction reversal ==
The train reverses its direction once at:

- Bathinda Junction.

== See also ==
- Rishikesh railway station
- Barmer railway station
