= Palanpur–Gandhidham Express =

Train in India

Overview
- Service type: Express
- Locale: Gujarat
- First service: 12 March 2012; 14 years ago
- Current operator: Western Railway

Route
- Termini: Palanpur (PNU); Gandhidham (GIMB)
- Stops: 31
- Distance travelled: 301 km (187 mi)
- Average journey time: 6 hours 40 minutes
- Service frequency: Daily
- Train number: 19405 / 19406

On-board services
- Class: General Unreserved
- Seating arrangements: Yes
- Sleeping arrangements: No
- Catering facilities: No
- Observation facilities: Large windows
- Baggage facilities: No
- Other facilities: Below the seats

Technical
- Rolling stock: ICF coach
- Track gauge: 5 ft 6 in (1,676 mm)
- Operating speed: 45 km/h (28 mph) average including halts.

The 19405 / 19406 Palanpur–Gandhidham Express is a express train belonging to Western Railway zone that runs between Gandhidham Junction and Palanpur Junction. It is currently being operated with 19405/19406 train numbers on a daily basis. Initially, train ran between Palanpur Junction and Bhuj. W.e.f 15-08-2018, It has been extended up to Gandhidham Junction.

== Average speed and frequency ==
19405/Gandhidham–Palanpur Express runs with an average speed of 43 km/h and completes 301 km in 7h. 19406/Palanpur-Gandhidham Express runs with an average speed of 42 km/h and completes 301 km in 7h 5m .

== Route and halts ==
19405/19406 Gandhidham–Palanpur Express route is via Bhildi Junction, Radhanpur, Samakhiali Junction, Gandhidham Junction.

== Coach composite ==
The train has standard ICF rakes with max speed of 110 kmph. The train consists of 15 coaches:

- 13 General Unreserved
- 2 Seating cum Luggage rake

== Traction ==
Both trains are hauled by a Vatva Loco Shed based WAP-4E electric locomotive from Palanpur to Gandhidham and vice versa.

== Rake sharing ==
The train shares its rake with 19151/19152 Palanpur–Bhuj Intercity Express .

== See also ==
- Gandhidham Junction railway station
- Palanpur Junction railway station
- Palanpur–Bhuj Intercity Express
