= Bhabhar railway station =

Railway station in Gujarat, India

Bhabhar railway station

General information
- Location: Bhabhar, Gujarat; India
- Coordinates: 24°03′53″N 71°36′56″E
- Elevation: 39 metres (128 ft)
- System: Indian Railways station
- Owner: Ministry of Railways, Indian Railways
- Operator: Western Railway
- Line: Gandhidham–Palanpur section
- Platforms: 1
- Tracks: 1

Construction
- Structure type: Standard (on ground)
- Parking: No

Other information
- Status: Functioning
- Station code: BAH
- Zone(s): Western Railway
- Division(s): Ahmedabad
Location
- Location within India Location within Gujarat

Bhabhar railway station is a railway station in Banaskantha district, Gujarat, India on the Western line of the Western Railway network. Bhabhar railway station is 88 km far away from Palanpur Junction. 1 Passenger, 1 Express and 1 Superfast trains halt here.

== Nearby stations ==
Devgam is nearest railway station towards Gandhidham Junction, whereas Mitha is nearest railway station towards Palanpur Junction.

== Major trains ==
Following Express and Superfast trains halt at Bhabhar railway station in both direction:

- 22483/84 Gandhidham–Jodhpur Express
- 19151/52 Palanpur–Bhuj Intercity Express
