= Bhagat Ki Kothi–Bandra Terminus Express (via Bhildi) =

Indian express train

Bhagat Ki Kothi - Bandra Terminus Express (via Bhildi)
Overview
- Service type: Express
- First service: 1 December 2019; 5 years ago
- Current operator(s): North Western Railway

Route
- Termini: Bhagat Ki Kothi (BGKT); Bandra Terminus (BDTS)
- Stops: 17
- Distance travelled: 942 km (585 mi)
- Average journey time: 20 hrs 30 mins
- Service frequency: Bi-Weekly
- Train number(s): 14817/14818

On-board services
- Class(es): AC 2 tier, AC 3 tier, Sleeper Class, General Unreserved
- Seating arrangements: Yes
- Sleeping arrangements: Yes
- Observation facilities: Standard ICF
- Entertainment facilities: No
- Baggage facilities: No

Technical
- Rolling stock: 2
- Track gauge: 1,676 mm (5 ft 6 in)
- Operating speed: 49 km/h (30 mph), including halts

The 14817/18 Bhagat Ki Kothi - Bandra Terminus Express is an express train belonging to North Western Railway zone that runs between Bhagat Ki Kothi and Bandra Terminus in India.

It is currently being operated with 14817/18 train numbers on bi-weekly basis via Bhildi Junction.

== Coach composition ==
The train has standard ICF rakes with max speed of 110 km/h. The train consists of 17 coaches:

- 1 AC II Tier
- 2 AC III Tier
- 6 Sleeper Coaches
- 6 General Unreserved
- 2 Seating cum Luggage Rake

== Service ==
The 14817/Bhagat Ki Kothi - Bandra Terminus Express has an average speed of 46 km/h and covers 942 km in 20 hrs 30 mins.

The 14818/Bandra Terminus - Bhagat Ki Kothi Express has an average speed of 49 km/h and covers 942 km in 19 hrs 15 mins.

== Route and halts ==
The important halts of the train are:

- Bhagat Ki Kothi
- Luni Junction
- Samdari Junction
- Mokalsar
- Jalor
- Modran
- Marwar Bhinmal
- Raniwara
- Dhanera
- Bhildi Junction
- Patan
- Mahesana Junction
- Ahmedabad Junction
- Vadodara Junction
- Bharuch Junction
- Surat
- Vapi
- Borivali
- Bandra Terminus

== Schedule ==
Train Number	Station Code	Departure Station	Departure Time	Departure Day	Arrival Station	Arrival Time	Arrival Day
14817	BGKT	Bhagat Ki Kothi	15:15 PM	Sun, Wed	Bandra Terminus	11:45 AM	Mon, Thu
14818	BDTS	Bandra Terminus	13:05 PM	Mon, Thu	Bhagat Ki Kothi	08:20 AM	Tue, Fri

== Rake sharing ==
The train shares its rake with 14803/04 Bhagat Ki Kothi - Ahmedabad Weekly Express.

== See also ==
- Bhagat Ki Kothi - Ahmedabad Weekly Express
