= Dhanera railway station =

Railway station in Gujarat, India

Dhanera

General information
- Location: Dhanera, Banaskantha, Gujarat; India
- Coordinates: 24°30′12″N 72°01′58″E
- Elevation: 135 metres (443 ft)
- System: Indian Railways station
- Owner: Ministry of Railways, Indian Railways
- Line: Bhildi–Samdari line
- Platforms: 2
- Tracks: 2

Construction
- Structure type: Standard (on ground)
- Parking: Yes

Other information
- Status: Functioning
- Station code: DQN
- Zone(s): North Western Railway
- Division(s): Jodhpur

History
- Electrified: 2024
Location
- Location within India Location within Gujarat

Dhanera railway station is a railway station in the City of Dhanera, Banaskantha district, Gujarat, India on the Western line of the North Western Railway network. Dhanera Railway Station is 55 km far away from Palanpur Junction and 36 km far away from Bhildi Junction. DEMU, Express and Superfast trains halt here.

Dhanera Railway Station is a very important railway station for the Dhanera Taluka and the Vav-Tharad 46 km away from District Headquarter Tharad.

== Trains ==
The following trains halt at Dhanera railway station in both directions:

Train Number	Train Name
14893/94	Palanpur-Bhagat ki kothi Mail/Express
22483/84	Gandhidham-Jodhpur Express
14803/04	Bhagat Ki Kothi–Ahmedabad Weekly Express
14805/06	Yesvantpur–Barmer AC Express
14807/08	Jodhpur–Dadar Western Express
14817/18	Bhagat Ki Kothi–Bandra Terminus Express (via Bhildi)
21901/02	Bandra Terminus–Barmer Humsafar Express
20491/92	Jaisalmer–Sabarmati Superfast Express
19271/72	Bhavnagar Terminus–Haridwar Weekly Express
74841/42	Bhagat Ki Kothi–Bhildi Demu
20485/86	Jaisalmer–Sabarmati Intercity Express
12489/90	Shri Ganganagar–Dadar Superfast Express
05045/46	Rajkot–Lalkua summar Spacial
12997/98	Bandra Terminus–Barmer Humsafar Express
19407/08	Sabarmati–Lalgarh Express
19403/04	Bhuj–Delhi Express
20625/26	MGR Chennai Central–Bhagat Ki Kothi Superfast Express
