= MBNL =

MBNL may refer to:

== Proteins ==
- MBNL1
- MBNL2
- MBNL3

== Telecommunications ==
- Mobile Broadband Network Limited

== Transportation ==
- Marwar Bhinmal railway station, Rajasthan, India, by Indian Railways station code
