= Gandhidham–Jodhpur Express =

Train in India

Overview
- Service type: Superfast
- Locale: Gujarat & Rajasthan
- Current operator: North Western Railway

Route
- Termini: Gandhidham (GIMB); Jodhpur (JU)
- Stops: 12
- Distance travelled: 560 km (348 mi)
- Average journey time: 9 hours 15 minutes
- Service frequency: Daily
- Train number: 22483 / 22484

On-board services
- Classes: AC 2 Tier, AC 3 Tier, Sleeper Class, General Unreserved
- Seating arrangements: Yes
- Sleeping arrangements: Yes
- Catering facilities: E-catering
- Observation facilities: Large windows
- Baggage facilities: No
- Other facilities: Below the seats

Technical
- Rolling stock: LHB coach
- Track gauge: 1,676 mm (5 ft 6 in)
- Operating speed: 60 km/h (37 mph) average including halts.
Route map
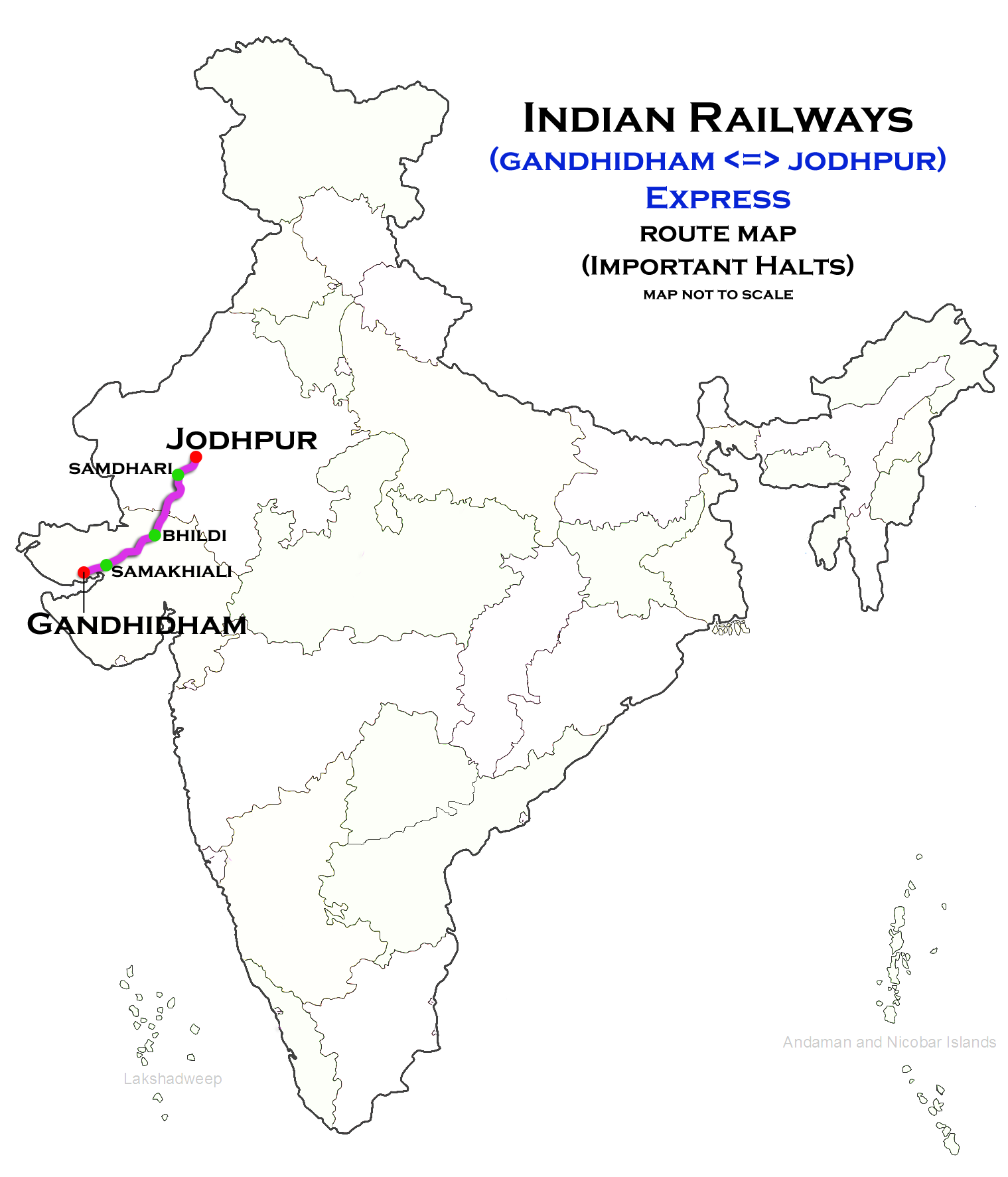

The 22483 / 22484 Gandhidham–Jodhpur Express is a superfast train belonging to North Western Railway zone that runs between Gandhidham Junction and Jodhpur Junction in India. It is currently being operated with 22483/22484 train numbers on tri-weekly basis.

== Coach composition ==
The train has LHB rakes with max speed of 130 kmph. The train consists of 14 coaches:

- 1 AC II Tier
- 2 AC III Tier
- 5 Sleeper Coaches
- 4 General Unreserved
- 2 Seating cum Luggage Rake

== Service ==
The 22483/Jodhpur–Gandhidham Express has an average speed of 56 km/h and covers 560 km in 09 hrs 55 mins.

The 22484/Gandhidham–Jodhpur Express has an average speed of 59 km/h and covers 560 km in 09 hrs 25 mins.

== Route and halts ==
The important halts of the train are:

- Gandhidham Junction
- Samakhiali Junction
- Radhanpur
- Bhabhar
- Bhildi Junction
- Dhanera
- Raniwara
- Marwar Bhinmal
- Modran
- Jalor
- Mokalsar
- Samdari Junction
- Luni Junction
- Jodhpur

== Schedule ==
Train number	Station code	Departure station	Departure time	Departure day	Arrival station	Arrival time	Arrival day
22483	JU	Jodhpur Junction	20:00 PM	Sun, Tue, Fri	Gandhidham Junction	05:55 AM	Mon, Wed, Sat
22484	GIMB	Gandhidham Junction	22:45 PM	Mon, Wed, Sat	Jodhpur Junction	08:10 AM	Sun, Tue, Thu

== Traction ==
Both trains are hauled by a Bhagat Ki Kothi Loco Shed-based WAP-7 electric locomotive from Gandhidham to Jodhpur and vice versa.
