= Radhanpur railway station =

Railway station in Gujarat, India

Radhanpur

General information
- Location: Radhanpur, Gujarat; India
- Coordinates: 23°50′47″N 71°35′10″E
- Elevation: 29 metres (95 ft)
- System: Indian Railways station
- Owner: Ministry of Railways, Indian Railways
- Operator: Western Railway
- Line: Gandhidham–Palanpur section
- Platforms: 3
- Tracks: 2

Construction
- Structure type: Standard (on ground)
- Parking: No

Other information
- Status: Functioning
- Station code: RDHP
- Zone(s): Western Railway
- Division(s): Ahmedabad
Location
- Location within India Location within Gujarat

Radhanpur railway station is a railway station in Patan district, Gujarat, India on the Western line of the Western Railway network. Radhanpur railway station is 113 km far away from Palanpur Junction. One Passenger, two Express, and two Superfast trains halt here.

== Nearby Stations ==
Piplee is the nearest railway station towards Gandhidham Junction, whereas Devgam is the nearest railway station towards Palanpur Junction.

== Major trains ==
Following Express and Superfast trains halt at Radhanpur railway station in both direction:

- 22483/84 Gandhidham–Jodhpur Express
- 12959/60 Dadar–Bhuj Superfast Express
- 19151/52 Palanpur–Bhuj Intercity Express
- 14321/22 Ala Hazrat Express (via Bhildi)
