= Bhagat Ki Kothi–Pune Express =

Train in India

Overview
- Service type: Express
- Locale: Maharashtra, Gujarat & Rajasthan
- Current operator: Central Railway

Route
- Termini: Bhagat Ki Kothi (BGKT); Pune Junction (PUNE)
- Stops: 24
- Distance travelled: 1,078 km (670 mi)
- Average journey time: 22 hours 10 mins
- Service frequency: Weekly
- Train number: 11089 / 11090

On-board services
- Classes: AC First Class, AC 2 Tier, AC 3 Tier, Sleeper Class, General Unreserved
- Seating arrangements: Yes
- Sleeping arrangements: Yes
- Catering facilities: E-catering, On-board catering
- Observation facilities: Large windows
- Baggage facilities: No
- Other facilities: Below the seats

Technical
- Rolling stock: LHB coach
- Track gauge: 1,676 mm (5 ft 6 in)
- Operating speed: 49 km/h (30 mph) average including halts.

The 11089 / 11090 Bhagat Ki Kothi–Pune Express is an express train belonging to Indian Railways – Central Railway zone that runs between Bhagat Ki Kothi and Pune Junction in India. It is currently being operated with 11089/11090 train numbers on a weekly basis.

It operates as train number 11089 from Bhagat Ki Kothi to Pune Junction and as train number 11090 in the reverse direction, serving the states of Rajasthan, Gujarat and Maharashtra.

== Coach composition ==
The train has standard LHB rakes with a maximum speed of 130 km/h. The train consists of 22 coaches:

- 1 AC II Tier
- 5 AC III Tier
- 10 Sleeper Coaches
- 4 General Unreserved
- 2 Seating cum Luggage Rake

Loco	1	2	3	4	5	6	7	8	9	10	11	12	13	14	15	16	17	18	19	20	21	22
	EoG	GEN	A1	H1	B1	B2	B3	B4	B5	B6	S1	S2	S3	S4	S5	S6	S7	S8	S9	S10	GEN	SLR

As is customary with most train services in India, coach composition may be amended at the discretion of Indian Railways depending on demand.

== Service ==
11089/ Bhagat Ki Kothi–Pune Express has an average speed of 46 km/h and covers 1078 km in 23 hrs 10 mins.

11090/ Pune–Bhagat Ki Kothi Express has an average speed of 50 km/h and covers 1078 km in 21 hrs 20 mins.

As the average speed of the train is lower than 55 km/h (34 mph), as per railway rules, its fare doesn't includes a Superfast surcharge.

== Route and halts ==
The important halts of the train are:

- Bhagat Ki Kothi
- Luni Junction
- Pali Marwar
- Marwar Junction
- Falna
- Abu Road
- Palanpur Junction
- Mahesana Junction
- Sabarmati Junction
- Ahmedabad Junction
- Nadiad Junction
- Anand Junction
- Vadodara Junction
- Bharuch Junction
- Surat
- Navsari
- Valsad
- Vapi
- Vasai Road
- Bhiwandi Road
- Kalyan Junction
- Karjat
- Lonavala
- Shivaji Nagar
- Pune Junction

== Schedule ==
Train number	Station code	Departure station	Departure time	Departure day	Arrival station	Arrival time	Arrival day
11089	BGKT	Bhagat Ki Kothi	05:30 AM	Tue	Pune Junction	04:40 AM	Wed
11090	PUNE	Pune Junction	19:50 PM	Sun	Bhagat Ki Kothi	17:10 PM	Mon

== Rake sharing ==
The train shares its rake with:

- 11087/11088 Veraval–Pune Express
- 11091/11092 Bhuj–Pune Express
- 11095/11096 Ahimsa Express
- 12103/12104 Pune–Lucknow Superfast Express

== Traction ==
Both trains are hauled by a Vatva Loco Shed-based WDM-3A from Bhagat Ki Kothi to Ahmedabad and from Ahmedabad it is hauled by a Vadodara Loco Shed-based WAP-5 or WAP-4E electric locomotive up til Pune.
