= Howrah–Barmer Superfast Express =

Train in India

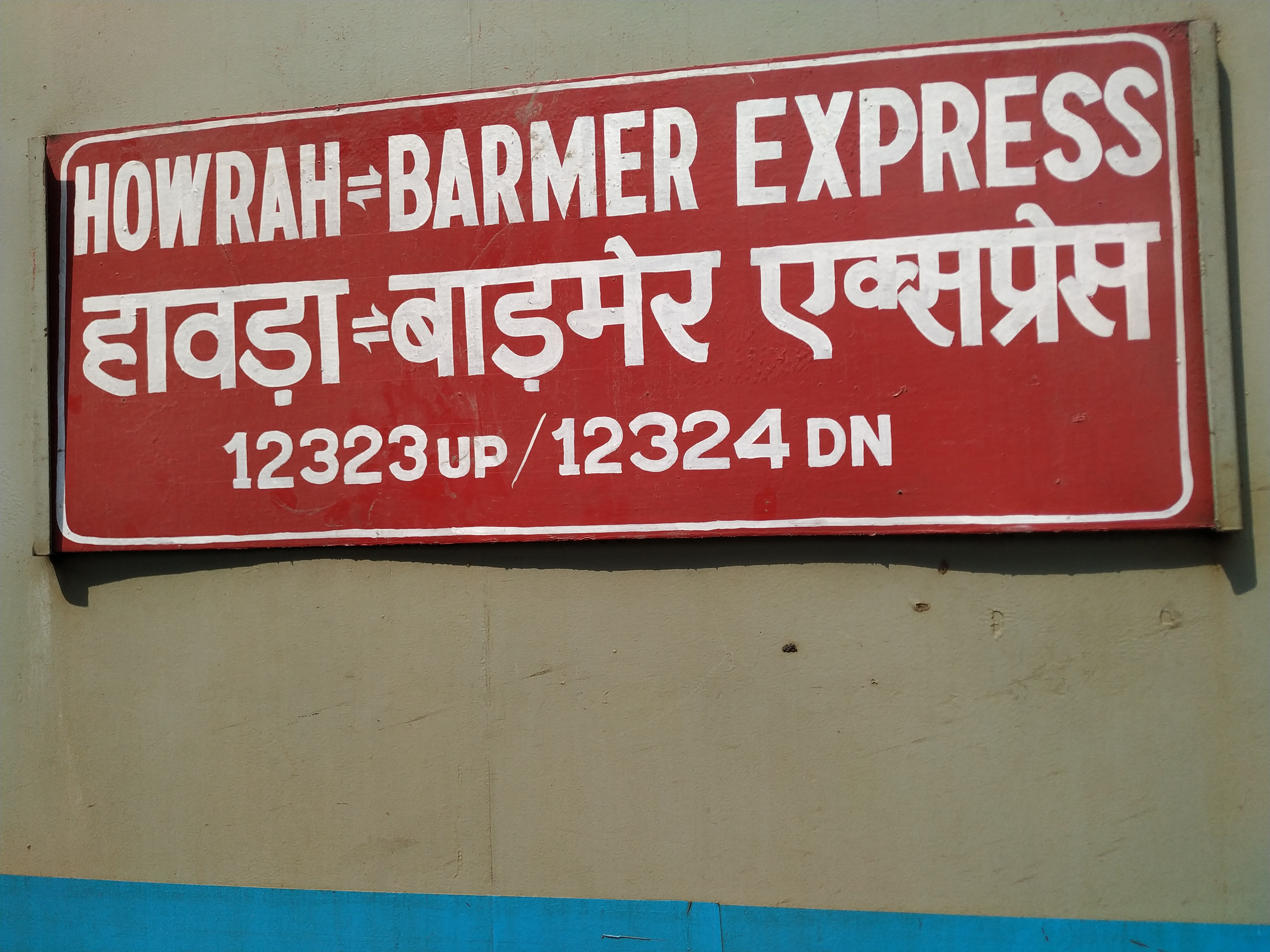
- 12323 Howrah-Barmer Express

Overview
- Service type: Superfast Express
- First service: 02 July 2002
- Current operator: Eastern Railways

Route
- Termini: Howrah Junction (HWH); Barmer (BME)
- Stops: 23
- Distance travelled: 2,280 km (1,417 mi)
- Average journey time: 35 hours and 40 minutes
- Service frequency: 2 days a week. 12323 Howrah–Barmer Superfast Express–Tuesday & Friday, 12324 Barmer–Howrah Superfast Express – Thursday & Sunday
- Train number: 12323 / 12324

On-board services
- Classes: AC 1st Class, AC 2 tier, AC 3 tier, Sleeper class, Unreserved/General
- Seating arrangements: Yes
- Sleeping arrangements: Yes
- Catering facilities: Pantry car attached
- Baggage facilities: Storage space under berth

Technical
- Rolling stock: LHB coach
- Track gauge: 1,676 mm (5 ft 6 in)
- Operating speed: 64 km/h (40 mph). 130 km/h (80 mph) maximum permissible speed.

The 12323 / 24 Howrah–Barmer Superfast Express is a Superfast Express train belonging to Indian Railways – Eastern Railway zone that runs between Howrah Junction and Barmer in India.

It operates as train number 12323 from Howrah Junction to Barmer railway station and as train number 12324 in the reverse direction, serving the states of West Bengal, Jharkhand, Bihar, Uttar Pradesh, Delhi, Haryana and Rajasthan

The train is extended till Barmer from 1 September 2020. Since normal operation is not going on, hence the COVID Special service of this train is right now operating from Barmer.

== Coaches ==
The 12323 / 24 Howrah–Barmer Superfast Express has 1 AC 1st Class cum AC 2 tier, 2 AC 2 tier, 5 AC 3 tier, 13 Sleeper class, 4 Unreserved/General and 2 Seating cum Luggage Rake coaches. It also carries a pantry car.

As is customary with most train services in India, coach composition may be amended at the discretion of Indian Railways depending on demand.

== Service ==
The 12323 Howrah–Barmer Superfast Express covers the distance of 2,279 km (1,416 mi) in 35 hours 40 mins (64 km/h) and in 35 hours 40 mins as 12324 Barmer–Howrah Superfast Express (62 km/h).

As the average speed of the train is above 55 km/h (34 mph), as per Indian Railways rules, its fare includes a Superfast surcharge.

== Routeing ==
The 12323 / 24 Howrah–Barmer Superfast Express runs from Howrah Junction via

- Asansol Junction
- Dhanbad Junction
- Koderma Junction
- Gaya Junction
- Sasaram Junction
- Pt. Deen Dayal Upadhyaya Junction
- Prayagraj Junction
- Kanpur Central
- Old Delhi
- Rewari Junction
- Jodhpur

to Barmer railway station.

== Gallery ==
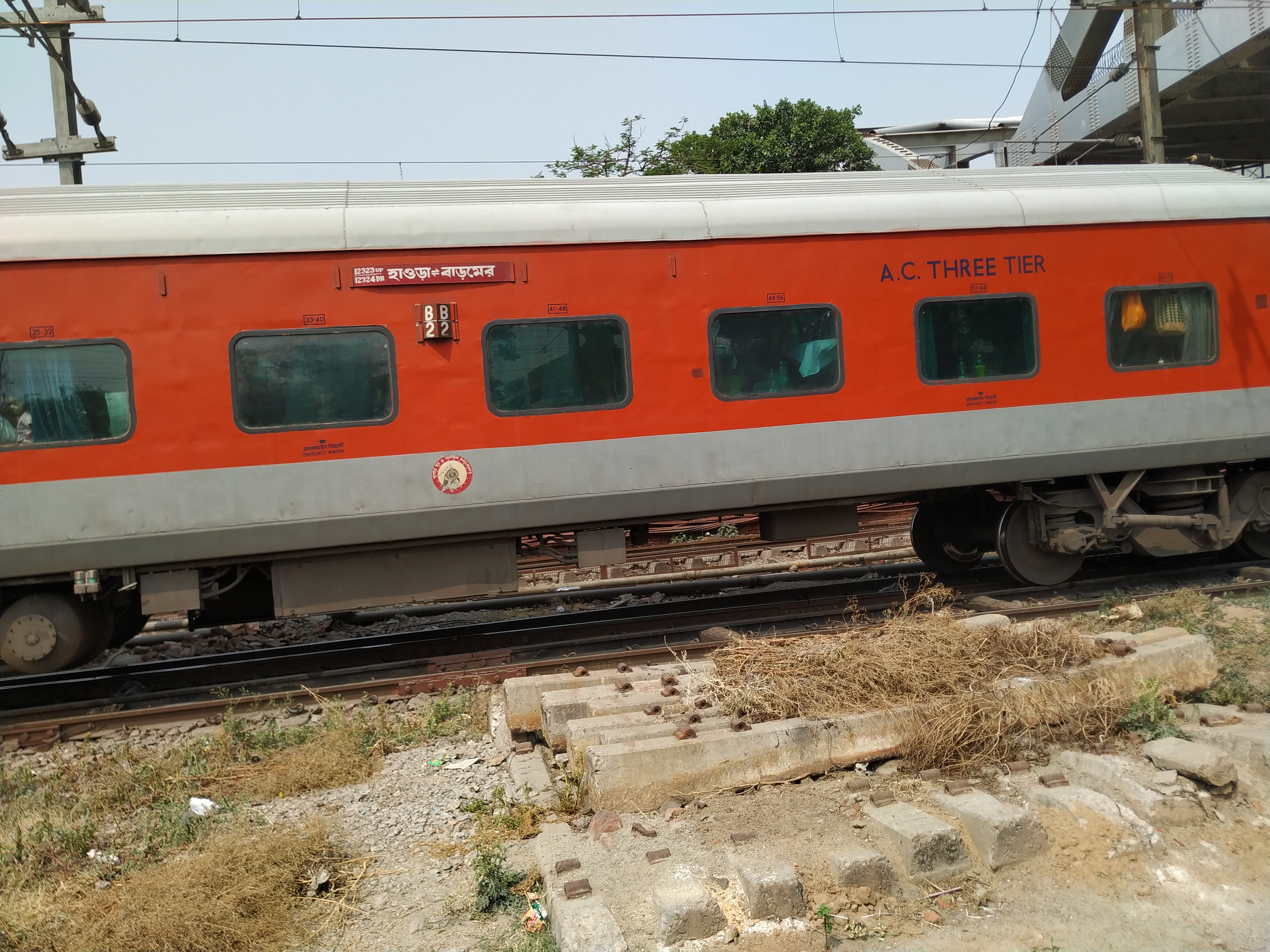
3 Tier AC coach of 12323 Howrah-Barmer Express.
