= Ranuj Junction railway station =

Railway station in Gujarat, India

Ranuj Junction

General information
- Location: Ranuj, Patan, Gujarat; India
- Coordinates: 23°45′37″N 72°12′49″E
- System: Indian Railways station
- Owner: Ministry of Railways, Indian Railways
- Operator: Western Railway
- Line: Mahesana–Patan–Bhildi line
- Platforms: 2
- Tracks: 2

Construction
- Structure type: Standard (on-ground station)
- Parking: No

Other information
- Status: Functioning
- Station code: RUJ
- Zone(s): Western Railway
- Division(s): Ahmedabad
Location
- Location within India Location within Gujarat

Ranuj Junction railway station is a railway station in Patan district, Gujarat, India on the Western line of the Western railway network. Ranuj Junction railway station is 13 km from Patan. Passenger and DEMU trains halt here.
