= Mokalsar railway station =

Railway station in Rajasthan

Mokalsar
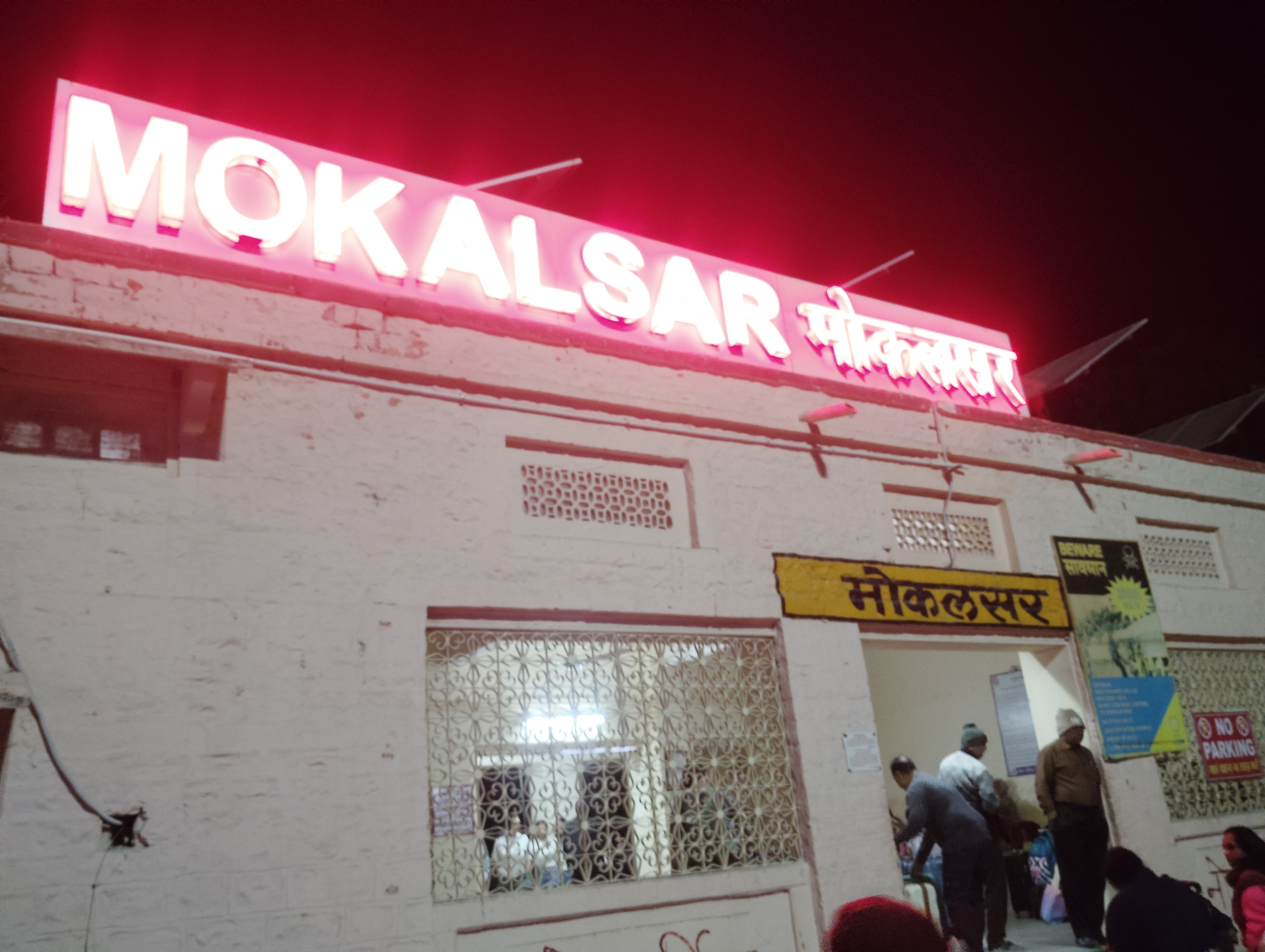

General information
- Location: Mokalsar, Barmer district, Rajasthan; India
- Coordinates: 25.627322°N 72.519515°E
- Elevation: 174 metres (571 ft)
- System: Indian Railways station
- Owner: Indian Railways
- Operator: North Western Railway
- Line: Samdari–Bhildi line
- Platforms: 2
- Tracks: 2

Construction
- Structure type: Standard (on ground station)
- Parking: Yes

Other information
- Status: Functioning
- Station code: MKSR
- Zone(s): North Western Railway
- Division(s): Jodhpur
Location
- Location within India Location within Rajasthan

Mokalsar railway station is a railway station in Barmer district, Rajasthan. Its code is MKSR. It serves Mokalsar village. The station consists of 2 platforms. Passenger, Express and Superfast trains halt here.

== Trains ==
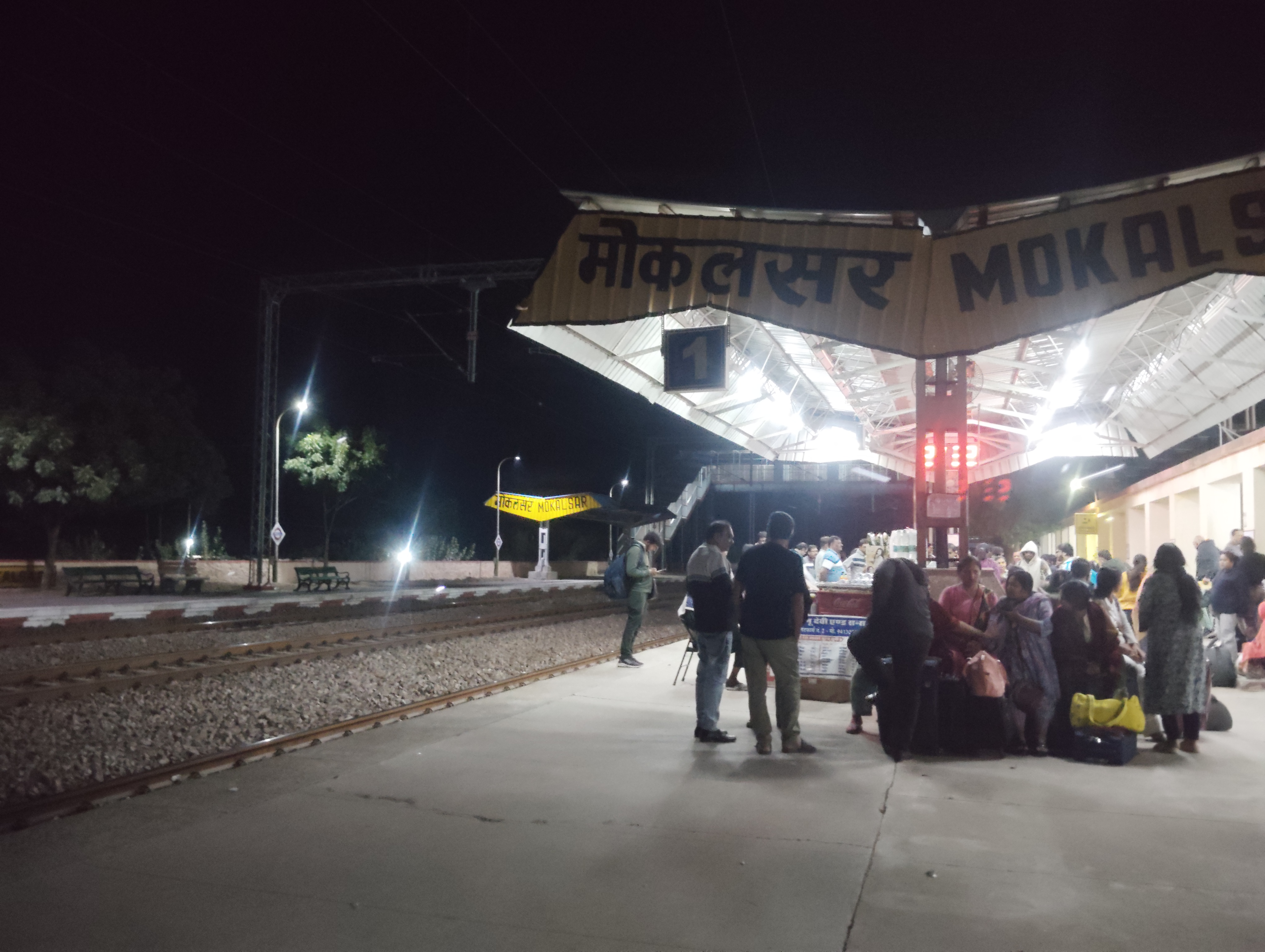
Platform

The following trains halt at Mokalsar railway station in both directions:

- Yesvantpur–Barmer AC Express
- Bhagat Ki Kothi–Ahmedabad Weekly Express
- Bikaner–Dadar Superfast Express
- Gandhidham–Jodhpur Express
- Bhagat Ki Kothi–Bandra Terminus Express (via Bhildi)
- 12997/98 Bandra Terminus - Barmer Humsafar Express
- 21901/02 Bandra Terminus - Barmer Humsafar Express
