= Modran railway station =

Railway station in Rajasthan

Modran

General information
- Location: Modran, Jalore district, Rajasthan; India
- Coordinates: 25.186938°N 72.447223°E
- Elevation: 137 metres (449 ft)
- System: Indian Railways station
- Owner: Indian Railways
- Operator: North Western Railway
- Line: Samdari–Bhildi line
- Platforms: 1
- Tracks: 1

Construction
- Structure type: Standard (on ground station)
- Parking: Yes

Other information
- Status: Functioning
- Station code: MON
- Zone(s): North Western Railway
- Division(s): Jodhpur
Location
- Location within India Location within Rajasthan

Modran railway station is a railway station in Jalor district, Rajasthan. Its code is MON. It serves Modran village. The station consists of a single platform. Passenger, Express and Superfast trains halt here.

== Trains ==
The following trains halt at Modran railway station in both directions:

- Yesvantpur–Barmer AC Express
- Bhagat Ki Kothi–Ahmedabad Weekly Express
- Bikaner–Dadar Superfast Express
- Gandhidham–Jodhpur Express
- Bhagat Ki Kothi–Bandra Terminus Express (via Bhildi)
- 12997/98 Bandra Terminus - Barmer Humsafar Express
- 21901/02 Bandra Terminus - Barmer Humsafar Express
