= Sabarmati–Patan DEMU =

Diesel-electric multiple unit used in India

Overview
- Service type: DEMU
- First service: 11 November 2011; 14 years ago
- Current operator: Western Railway zone

Route
- Termini: Sabarmati Junction (SBIB); Patan (PTN)
- Stops: 7
- Distance travelled: 103 km (64 mi)
- Average journey time: 2 hours 35 minutes
- Service frequency: Daily (Note: Runs seven days in a week for every direction.)
- Train number: 79433/79434 79435/79436

On-board services
- Class: General Unreserved
- Seating arrangements: Yes
- Sleeping arrangements: No
- Catering facilities: No
- Observation facilities: ICF coach
- Entertainment facilities: No
- Baggage facilities: Below the seats

Technical
- Rolling stock: 1
- Track gauge: 1,676 mm (5 ft 6 in)
- Operating speed: 40 km/h (25 mph) average with halts

Sabarmati–Patan DEMU is a DEMU train belonging to Western Railway zone that runs between Sabarmati Junction and Patan of Gujarat. It is currently being operated with 79433/79434 and 79435/79436 train numbers on daily basis.

== Route and halts ==
The important halts of the train are:

- Sabarmati Junction
- Kalol Junction
- Ambliyasan Junction
- Patan Junction

== Average speed and frequency ==
- 79435/Sabarmati BG–Patan DEMU has average speed of 39 km/h and completes 103 km in 1 hour 40 minutes. 79436/Patan–Sabarmati BG DEMU has average speed of 44 km/h and completes 103 km in 2 hour 20 minutes.
- 79433/Sabarmati BG–Patan DEMU has average speed of 40 km/h and completes 103 km in 1 hour 40 minutes. 79434/Patan–Sabarmati BG DEMU has average speed of 44 km/h and completes 103 km in 2 hour 20 minutes.

There are seven trains which run on a daily basis.

== Schedule ==
Train number	Departure station	Departure time	Departure day	Arrival station	Arrival time	Arrival day
79433	Sabarmati Junction	19:15	Daily	Patan	21:55	Daily
79434	Patan	06:00	Daily	Sabarmati Junction	08:15	Daily
79435	Sabarmati Junction	10:50	Daily	Patan	13:25	Daily
79436	Patan	13:50	Daily	Sabarmati Junction	16:10	Daily

== Traction ==
DEMU: Rated power is 1600 HP and has 10 coaches with maximum speed is 110 kmph. Transmission is AC electric. Rakes are made at ICF coach.

== See also ==
- Patan Junction railway station
- Mahesana–Abu Road DEMU
