= Jalor railway station =

Railway station in Rajasthan, India

Jalor Railway Station जालोर रेलवे स्टेशन
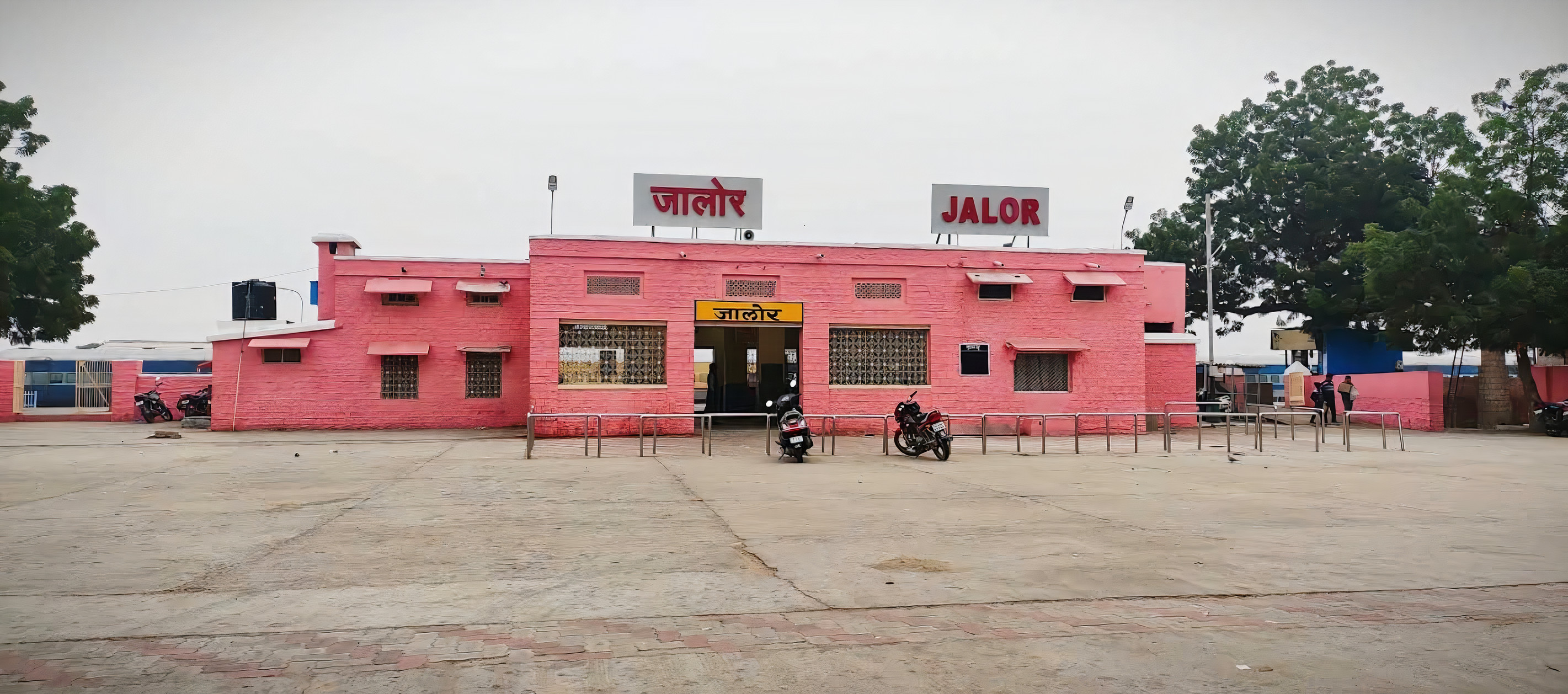
- Jalor Railway Station Entrance in 2020

General information
- Location: Jalor, Jalore district, Rajasthan; India
- Coordinates: 25.3543°N 72.6342°E
- Elevation: 160 metres (520 ft)
- System: Indian Railways station
- Owner: Indian Railways
- Operator: North Western Railway
- Line: Samdari–Bhildi line
- Platforms: 2
- Tracks: 2

Construction
- Structure type: Standard (on ground station)
- Parking: Yes

Other information
- Status: Functioning
- Station code: JOR
- Zone(s): North Western Railway
- Division(s): Jodhpur
Location
- Location within Rajasthan

Jalor railway station is an Indian railway station in Jalor district, Rajasthan. Its code is JOR. It serves Jalor city. The station consists of two platforms. Passenger, Express and Superfast trains halt here.

== Trains ==
The following trains halt at Jalor railway station in both directions:

- Yesvantpur–Barmer AC Express
- Bhagat Ki Kothi–Ahmedabad Weekly Express
- Bikaner–Dadar Superfast Express
- Gandhidham–Jodhpur Express
- Bhagat Ki Kothi–Bandra Terminus Express (via Bhildi)
- Bhavnagar Haridwar Express
- Bhagat Ki Kothi Dadar Express
- 12997/98 Bandra Terminus - Barmer Humsafar Express
- 21901/02 Bandra Terminus - Barmer Humsafar Express
