= Kalol Junction railway station =

Railway station in Gujarat, India

Kalol Junction

General information
- Location: Kalol, Gandhinagar, Gujarat; India
- Coordinates: 23°14′37″N 72°30′13″E
- Elevation: 78 m (256 ft)
- System: Indian Railway Station
- Owner: Indian Railways
- Operator: Western Railway
- Lines: Ahmedabad–Delhi main line Jaipur–Ahmedabad line Kalol – Khodiyar line
- Platforms: 3
- Tracks: 6
- Connections: Taxi Stand, Auto Stand

Construction
- Structure type: Standard (on ground station)
- Parking: Available
- Cycle facilities: Available
- Accessible: Disabled access

Other information
- Status: Functioning
- Station code: KLL
- Zone(s): Western Railway
- Division(s): Ahmedabad
Location
- Location within India Location within Gujarat

Kalol Junction Railway Station is a railway station in Kalol, Gandhinagar of Gujarat, India. Its code is KLL. Kalol lies on the main railway line connecting Ahmedabad to Jaipur. Kalol Junction railway station is under Ahmedabad Division of Western Railways. Gandhinagar Capital is connected to Kalol via Kalol – Gandhinagar – Khodiyar line. Passenger and Express trains halt here.

Kalol Junction is well connected by rail to Bandra Terminus, Ahmedabad Junction, Haridwar Junction, Bikaner Junction, Jaipur Junction, Jodhpur Junction, Mahesana Junction and Patan.

== Major trains ==
Following trains halt at Kalol Junction in both directions:

- 14707/08 Bandra Terminus – Bikaner Ranakpur Express
- 19031/32 Ahmedabad – Haridwar Yoga Express
- 19707/08 Bandra Terminus – Jaipur Amrapur Aravali Express
