= Ahimsa Express =

Train in India

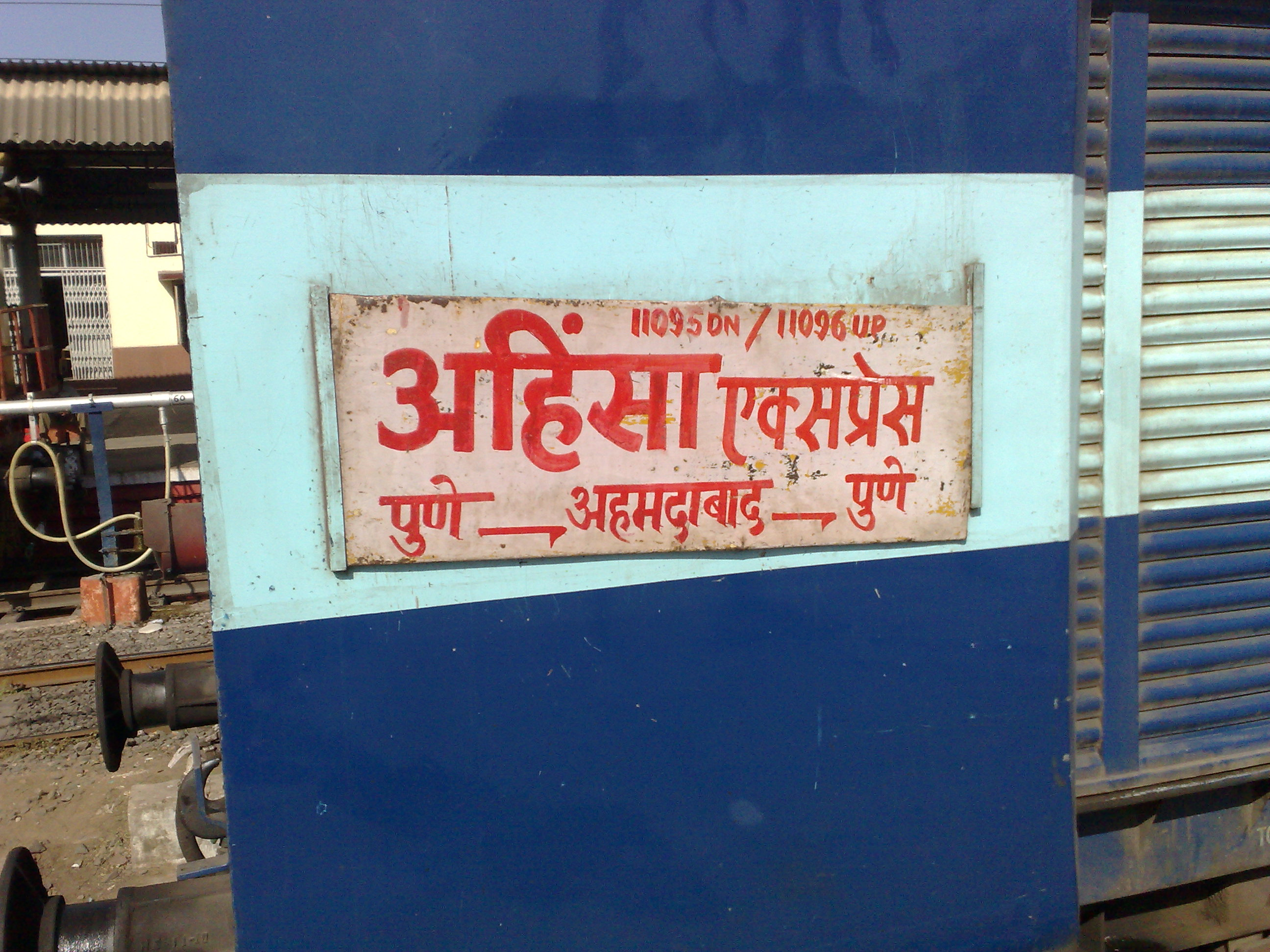

Overview
- Service type: Express
- Locale: Maharashtra, Gujarat
- First service: 1 January 1991; 34 years ago
- Current operator: Central Railway

Route
- Termini: Ahmedabad Junction (ADI); Pune Junction (PUNE)
- Stops: 15
- Distance travelled: 635 km (395 mi)
- Average journey time: 11 hours 15 minutes as 22185 Ahmedabad Junction–Pune Junction Ahimsa Express. 11 hours 20 minutes as 22186 Pune Junction–Ahmedabad Junction Ahimsa Express.
- Service frequency: Weekly. 22185 Ahmedabad Junction–Pune Junction Ahimsa Express – Thursday. 11096 Pune Junction–Ahmedabad Junction Ahimsa Express – Wednesday.
- Train number: 22185/22186

On-board services
- Classes: AC 1st Class, AC 2 tier, AC 3 tier, Sleeper class, Unreserved/General
- Seating arrangements: Yes
- Sleeping arrangements: Yes
- Catering facilities: No Pantry car attached

Technical
- Rolling stock: Standard Indian Railways ICF coach
- Track gauge: 1,676 mm (5 ft 6 in)
- Operating speed: 110 km/h (68 mph) maximum 52.21 km/h (32 mph), including halts

The 22185/22186 Ahimsa Express is an Express train belonging to Indian Railways that runs between Ahmedabad Junction and Pune Junction in India. It is currently being operated with 22185/22186 train numbers on a weekly basis.

It operates as train number 22185 from Ahmedabad Junction to Pune Junction and as train number 22186 in the reverse direction, serving the states of Gujarat and Maharashtra. The word Ahimsa means non-violence in Sanskrit.

== Coach composition ==
The train has standard ICF coach with max speed of 110 km/h (68 mph). The train consists of 22 coaches:

- 1 AC 1st Class
- 1 AC 2 tier
- 6 AC 3 tier
- 10 Sleeper class
- 2 Unreserved/General
- 2 Seating cum Luggage Rake

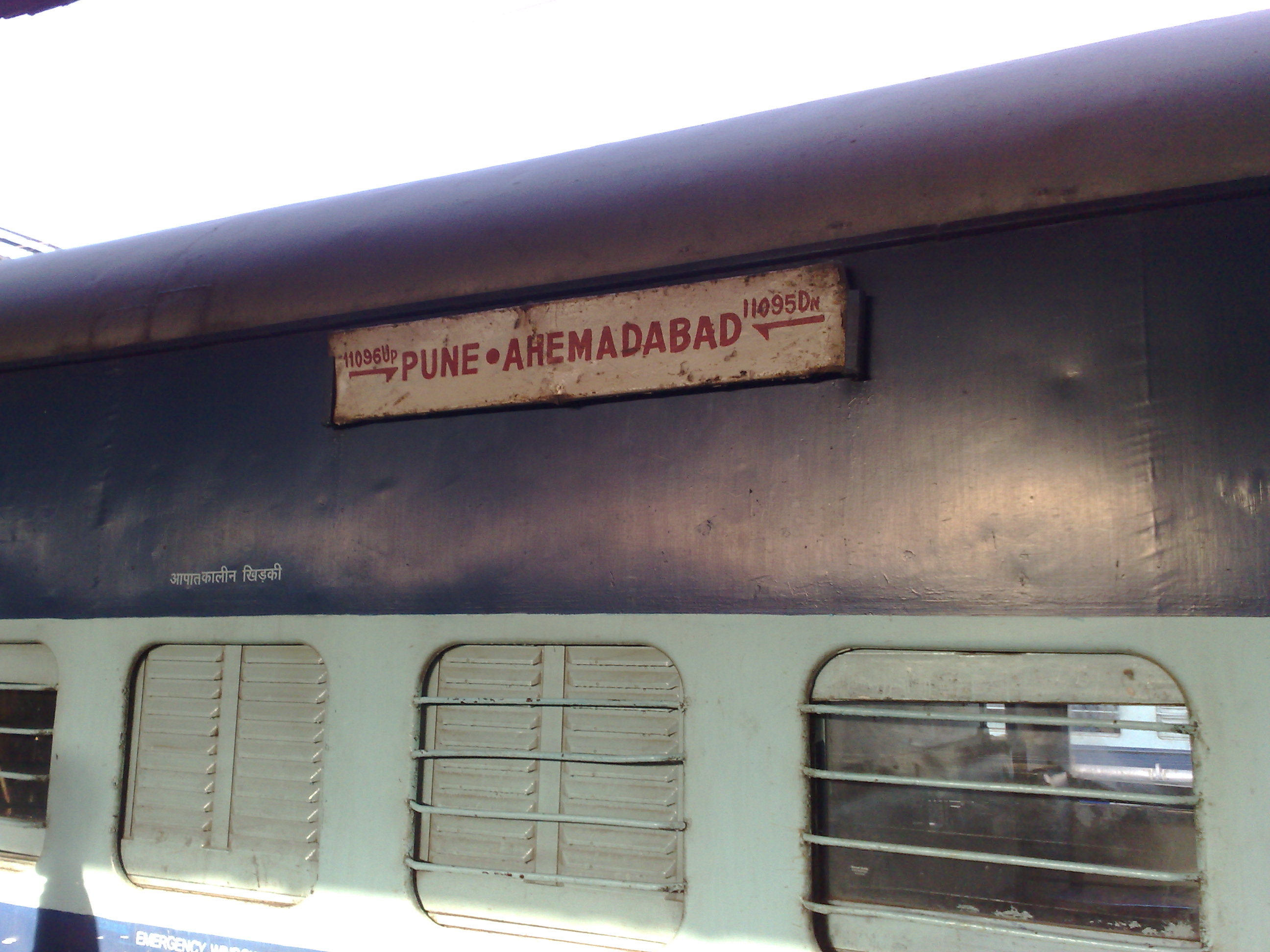
11095 Ahimsa Express coach

Loco	1	2	3	4	5	6	7	8	9	10	11	12	13	14	15	16	17	18	19	20	21	22
	SLR	GEN	A1	H1	B1	B2	B3	B4	B5	B6	S1	S2	S3	S4	S5	S6	S7	S8	S9	S10	GEN	SLR

== Service ==
- 11095/Ahmedabad–Pune Ahimsa Express covers the distance of 625 kilometres in 12 hours 25 minutes (50 km/h).
- 11096/Pune–Ahmedabad Ahimsa Express covers the distance of 625 kilometres in 11 hours 55 minutes (52 km/h).

As the average speed of the train is below 55 km/h (34 mph), its fare does not include a Superfast surcharge.

== Route and halts ==
The 11095/11096 Ahimsa Express runs from Pune Junction via Karjat, Kalyan Junction,Bhiwandi Road,Vasai Road, Surat, Vadodara Junction to Ahmedabad Junction.

== Schedule ==
Train number	Station code	Departure station	Departure time	Departure day	Arrival station	Arrival time	Arrival day
11095	ADI	Ahmedabad Junction	16:15 PM	Thu	Pune Junction	04:40 AM	Fri
11096	PUNE	Pune Junction	19:50 PM	Wed	Ahmedabad Junction	07:45 AM	Thu

== Rake sharing ==
The train shares its rake with;

- 11087/11088 Veraval–Pune Express,
- 11089/11090 Bhagat Ki Kothi–Pune Express,
- 11091/11092 Bhuj–Pune Express,
- 12103/12104 Pune–Lucknow Superfast Express.

== Traction ==
The entire route is fully electrified.

Previously, the train was powered by a Kalyan-based WCAM-3 end to end.

With the switchover from DC traction to AC traction, it is now hauled by a Vadodara-based WAP-4E / WAP-5 locomotive.
