= Adesar =

City in Gujarat, India

- Village
- Location in Gujarat, India Adesar (India)
- Coordinates: 23°33′32″N 70°59′00″E
- Country: India
- State: Gujarat
- District: Kutch
- Taluka: Rapar
- Elevation: 79 m (259 ft)

Population (2013)
  - Total: 9,560 +
  - Density: 2,000/km^{2} (5,200/sq mi)

Languages
  - Official: Kutchi, Gujarati, Hindi
- Time zone: UTC+5:30 (IST)
- PIN: 370 155
- Telephone code: 02830
- Vehicle registration: GJ-12

Adesar is a small village in Kutch district, Gujarat, India.

== History ==
The town was protected by fort which were damaged in 1816 following war with Rao Bharmalji of Cutch State.

The town had ancient Suryanarayan temple destroyed in 2001 Bhuj earthquake. It was rebuilt again later.
