= Dhanera =

Dhanera City
- Location in Gujarat, India Dhanera (India)
- Coordinates: 24.52°N 72.02°E
- india: India
- State: Gujarat
- District: Banaskantha
- Taluka: Dhanera

Government
  - Type: Municipality
  - Body: Dhanera municipality

Area
  - Total: 25 km^{2} (9.7 sq mi)
- Elevation: 128 m (420 ft)

Population (2011)
  - Total: 229,578
  - Density: 9,200/km^{2} (24,000/sq mi)

Languages
  - Official: Gujarati
- Time zone: UTC+5:30 (IST)
- Postal code: 385310
- Vehicle registration: GJ08

Dhanera is a city in Banaskantha District in the northern part of the state of Gujarat, India.

== Geography ==
Dhanera is located at 24.52°N 72.02°E. It has an average elevation of 128 metres (420 ft).

== Demographics ==
As of 2001 Indian census, Dhanera had a population of 22,183. Males constitute 52% of the population and females 48%. Dhanera has an average literacy rate of 55%, lower than the national average of 59.5%. Male literacy is 67% and, female literacy is 42%. In Dhanera, 18% of the population is under 6 years of age.

== Transport ==
The town being the headquarters of Dhanera taluka is well-connected by road and rail.

=== Rail ===
Dhanera Railway Station, on the jodhpur-palanpur-Ahmedabad-surat mainline, comes under the administrative control of North Western Railway zone of the Indian Railways. It has direct rail links on the broad gauge to the cities and towns in Gujarat such as Ahmedabad, Surat, Vadodra, Bhuj, Rajkot, Jamnagar and Porbandar.It is connected to most of the cities of Chennai, Thiruvananthapuram, Mysore, Bangalore, Pune, Mumbai, Jaipur, Jodhpur, Delhi, Dehradun, Muzaffarpur, Bareilly and Jammu.

=== Road ===
National Highway 168 connecting Junction with NH 68 Near Tharad - Dhanera - Panthawada in Gujarat and National Highway 168A connecting Dhanera Junction with NH 27 Near Deesa connect to Deesa and Palanpur.

=== Air ===
The nearest Airport is the Dhanera Airport, originally built to serve the princely state of Palanpur. It is just 36 km from Dhanera city. The nearest International Airport is Sardar Vallabhbhai Patel International Airport, Ahmedabad which is 198 km far from Dhanera.
