= MBNL3 =

Protein-coding gene in humans

Identifiers
- Aliases: MBNL3, CHCR, MBLX, MBLX39, MBXL, muscleblind like splicing regulator 3
- External IDs: OMIM: 300413; MGI: 2444912; GeneCards: MBNL3

Gene location (Human)
Chr.	X chromosome (human)
Band	Xq26.2	Start	132,369,317 bp
Band	Xq26.2	End	132,489,968 bp

Gene location (Mouse)
Chr.	X chromosome (mouse)
Band	X|X A5	Start	50,206,146 bp
Band	X|X A5	End	50,295,409 bp
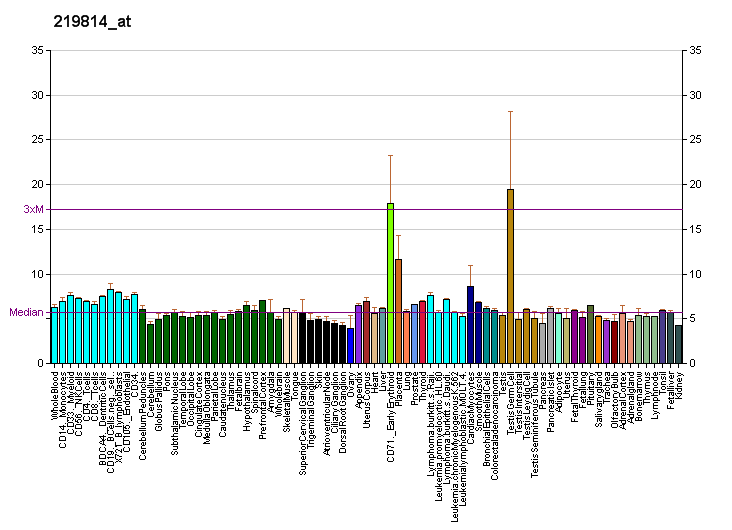
RNA expression pattern
Bgee	Human / Mouse (ortholog); Top expressed in: tail of epididymis; germinal epithelium; corpus epididymis; trabecular bone; placenta; gingival epithelium; caput epididymis; seminal vesicula; mucosa of sigmoid colon; parietal pleura / Top expressed in: umbilical cord; transitional epithelium of urinary bladder; left lung lobe; gastrula; conjunctival fornix; lacrimal gland; decidua; abdominal wall; ureter; dermis; More reference expression data
BioGPS	More reference expression data
Gene ontology
Molecular function	protein binding; metal ion binding; RNA binding; DNA-binding transcription factor activity, RNA polymerase II-specific
Cellular component	cytoplasm; nucleus; nucleoplasm
Biological process	multicellular organism development; regulation of RNA splicing; mRNA processing; negative regulation of myoblast differentiation; RNA splicing; regulation of alternative mRNA splicing, via spliceosome; regulation of transcription by RNA polymerase II
Sources:Amigo / QuickGO
Orthologs
Databases	NCBI: entry; OMA: entry
Species	Human	Mouse
Entrez	55796	171170
Ensembl	ENSG00000076770	ENSMUSG00000036109
UniProt	Q9NUK0	Q8R003
RefSeq (mRNA)	NM_001170701; NM_001170702; NM_001170703; NM_001170704; NM_018388 NM_133486	NM_134163; NM_001310515
RefSeq (protein)	NP_001164172; NP_001164173; NP_001164174; NP_001164175; NP_060858 NP_597846	NP_001297444; NP_598924
Location (UCSC)	Chr X: 132.37 – 132.49 Mb	Chr X: 50.21 – 50.3 Mb
PubMed search
- Wikidata
View/Edit Human	View/Edit Mouse

Muscleblind-like protein 3 is a protein that in humans is encoded by the MBNL3 gene.
