= Barmer railway station =

Railway station in Rajasthan, India

Barmer

General information
- Location: Station Road, Barmer, Rajasthan; India
- Coordinates: 25.7463°N 71.3975°E
- Elevation: 193 metres (633 ft)
- System: Indian Railways station
- Owner: Indian Railways
- Operator: North Western Railway
- Line: Marwar Junction–Munabao line
- Platforms: 3
- Tracks: 4
- Connections: Auto stand

Construction
- Structure type: Standard (on-ground station)
- Depth: 0
- Platform levels: 0
- Parking: Yes
- Cycle facilities: Yes

Other information
- Status: Functioning
- Station code: BME
- Zone(s): North Western Railway
- Division(s): Jodhpur
Location
- Location within India Location within Rajasthan

Barmer railway station is a main railway station in Barmer district, Rajasthan. Its code is BME. It serves Barmer city. The station consists of three platforms. The platforms are well sheltered.

== Trains ==
Some of the trains that run from Barmer are:

- Barmer jodhpur express
- Yesvantpur–Barmer AC Express
- Barmer Jodhpur DEMU
- Barmer Howrah SF
- Barmar–Rishikesh Express
- Barmer–Guwahati Express
- Barmer–Jodhpur Passenger
- Barmer–Munabao Passenger
- Barmer Jammu tavi
- Barmer–Jaipur Superfast Express
- 12997/98 Bandra Terminus - Barmer Humsafar Express
- 21901/02 Bandra Terminus - Barmer Humsafar Express
