= Marwar Bhinmal railway station =

Railway station in Rajasthan

Marwar Bhinmal
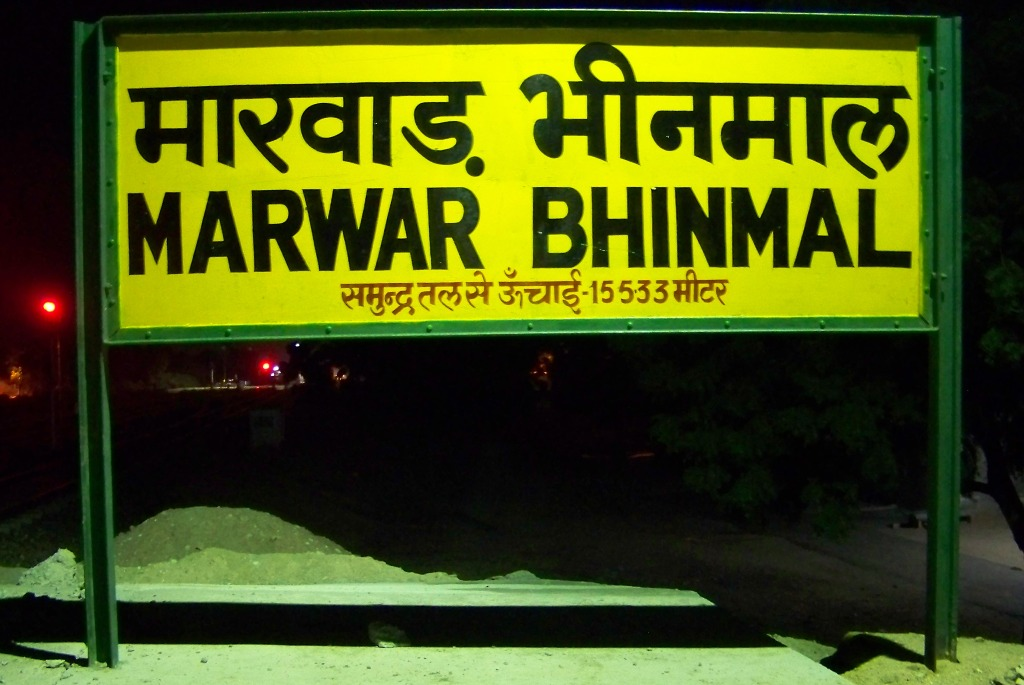

General information
- Location: Bhinmal, Jalor district, Rajasthan; India
- Coordinates: 25.000893°N 72.275774°E
- Elevation: 153 metres (502 ft)
- System: Indian Railways station
- Owner: Indian Railways
- Operator: North Western Railway
- Line: Samdari–Bhildi line
- Platforms: 2
- Tracks: 2

Construction
- Structure type: Standard (on ground station)
- Parking: Yes

Other information
- Status: Functioning
- Station code: MBNL
- Zone(s): North Western Railway
- Division(s): Jodhpur
Location
- Location within India Location within Rajasthan

Marwar Bhinmal railway station is a railway station in Jalor district, Rajasthan. Its code is MBNL. It serves Bhinmal town. The station consists of 2 well-developed platforms equipped with modern seating and automated coach display boards. Classified under the NSG-4 category (Non-Suburban Group), indicating high regional passenger utility. Operating under the Jodhpur Division of the North Western Railway zone, it serves as a critical rail gateway for the western Rajasthan region. It hosts over 30 scheduled daily and weekly train halts. Positioned on the Samdari–Bhildi line, linking Jodhpur/Northern Rajasthan to Gujarat and South India.

== Trains ==
The following trains halt at Marwar Bhinmal railway station in both directions:

- Yesvantpur–Barmer AC Express
- Bhagat Ki Kothi–Ahmedabad Weekly Express
- Bikaner–Dadar Superfast Express
- Gandhidham–Jodhpur Express
- Bhagat Ki Kothi–Bandra Terminus Express (via Bhildi)
- Bandra Terminus - Barmer Humsafar Express
- Bandra Terminus - Barmer Humsafar Superfast Express
