= Bhildi Junction railway station =

Railway station in Gujarat, India

Bhildi Junction railway station

General information
- Location: Bhildi, Banaskantha district, Gujarat; India
- Coordinates: 24°11′41″N 72°00′36″E
- System: Indian Railways station
- Owner: Ministry of Railways, Indian Railways
- Operator: Western Railway
- Lines: Gandhidham–Palanpur section Samdari–Bhildi line Patan–Bhildi line
- Platforms: 3
- Tracks: 6

Construction
- Structure type: Standard (on ground)
- Parking: No

Other information
- Status: Functioning
- Station code: BLDI
- Zone(s): Western Railway
- Division(s): Ahmedabad
Location
- Location within India Location within Gujarat

Bhildi Junction railway station is a major railway station in Banaskantha district, Gujarat, India on the Western line of the Western Railway network. Bhildi is a junction railway station having two line Bhildi-Gandhidham line, Bhildi-Samdari line and Bhildi-Patan line Bhildi Junction railway station is 46 kilometres (29 mi) from Palanpur Junction. Passenger, Express and Superfast trains halt here.

== Nearby stations ==
Jasali is the nearest railway station towards Gandhidham Junction, whereas Lorwada is the nearest railway station towards Palanpur Junction.

== Trains ==
The following Express and Superfast trains halt at Bhildi Junction railway station in both directions:

- 22483/84 Gandhidham–Jodhpur Express
- 19151/52 Palanpur–Bhuj Intercity Express
- 14805/06 Yesvantpur–Barmer AC Express
- 14803/04 Bhagat Ki Kothi–Ahmedabad Weekly Express
- 12489/90 Bikaner–Dadar Superfast Express
- 14321/22 Ala Hazrat Express (via Bhildi)
- 12959/60 Dadar–Bhuj Superfast Express
- 14817/18 Bhagat Ki Kothi–Bandra Terminus Express (via Bhildi)
- 19271/72 Bhavnagar Terminus-Haridwar Express
- 12997/98 Bandra Terminus - Barmer Humsafar Express
- 21901/02 Bandra Terminus - Barmer Humsafar Express
