= Bhagat Ki Kothi–Ahmedabad Weekly Express =

Train in India

Overview
- Service type: Express
- First service: 24 February 2014; 12 years ago
- Current operator: North Western Railway

Route
- Termini: Bhagat Ki Kothi (BGKT); Ahmedabad (ADI)
- Stops: 15
- Distance travelled: 481 km (299 mi)
- Average journey time: 9 hrs 35 mins
- Service frequency: Weekly. (Note: Runs one day in a week for every direction.)
- Train number: 14803 / 14804

On-board services
- Classes: AC 2 Tier, AC 3 Tier, Sleeper Class, General Unreserved
- Seating arrangements: No
- Sleeping arrangements: Yes
- Catering facilities: On-board catering, E-catering
- Observation facilities: Large windows
- Baggage facilities: No
- Other facilities: Below the seats

Technical
- Rolling stock: ICF coach
- Track gauge: 1,676 mm (5 ft 6 in)
- Operating speed: 50 km/h (31 mph) average including halts.

The 14803 / 14804 Bhagat Ki Kothi–Ahmedabad Weekly Express is an express train belonging to North Western Railway zone that runs between Bhagat Ki Kothi and Ahmedabad Junction in India. It is currently operated with 14803/14804 train numbers on a weekly basis.

== Service ==
The 14803/Bhagat Ki Kothi–Ahmedabad Weekly Express has an average speed of 50 km/h and covers 481 km in 9h 35m . The 14804/Ahmedabad–Bhagat Ki Kothi Weekly Express has an average speed of 48 km/h and covers 481 km in 10h.

== Schedule ==
Train number	Station code	Departure station	Departure time	Departure day	Arrival station	Arrival time	Arrival day
14803	BGKT	Bhagat Ki Kothi	10:15 AM	Friday	Ahmedabad Junction	Friday (Same day)	8:00 PM
14804	ADI	Ahmedabad Junction	9:00 PM	Friday	Bhagat Ki Kothi	7:00 AM	Saturday

== Route and halts ==
The important halts of the train are:

- Bhagat Ki Kothi
- Luni Junction
- Samdari Junction
- Dhanera
- Bhildi Junction
- Palanpur Junction
- Mahesana Junction
- Sabarmati Junction
- Ahmedabad Junction

== Coach composition ==
The train has standard ICF rakes with max speed of 110 kmph. The train consists of 18 coaches:

- 1 AC II Tier
- 2 AC III Tier
- 7 Sleeper coaches
- 6 General Unreserved
- 2 Seating cum Luggage Rake

== Traction ==
Both trains are hauled by a Bhagat Ki Kothi Loco Shed-based WDP-4D diesel locomotive from Bhagat Ki Kothi to Ahmedabad and vice versa.

== Direction reversal ==
The train reverses its direction 1 times:

- Palanpur Junction
- Bhildi Junction

== Rake sharing ==
04817/04818–04817/Bhagat Ki Kothi–Bandra Terminus Special Fare Special (via Bhildi)

== See also ==
- Bhagat Ki Kothi railway station
- Ahmedabad Junction railway station
