= Luni Junction railway station =

Railway station in Rajasthan, India

Luni Junction

General information
- Location: State Highway 68, Luni, Rajasthan; India
- Coordinates: 26.0026°N 73.0026°E
- Elevation: 108 metres (354 ft)
- System: Indian Railways station
- Owner: Indian Railways
- Operator: North Western Railway
- Platforms: 3
- Tracks: 4 (Double Diesel BG)
- Connections: Auto stand

Construction
- Structure type: Standard (on-ground station)
- Parking: No
- Cycle facilities: No

Other information
- Status: Functioning
- Station code: LUNI
- Zone(s): North Western Railway
- Division(s): Jodhpur
Location

Luni Junction railway station is a small railway station in Jodhpur district, Rajasthan. Its code is LUNI. It serves Luni city. The station consists of two platforms. The platforms are not well sheltered.

== Major trains ==
- Bhagat Ki Kothi–Pune Express
- Hisar–Coimbatore AC Superfast Express
- Suryanagri Express
- Ranakpur Express
- Bikaner–Dadar Superfast Express
- Gandhidham–Jodhpur Express
