= Patan Junction railway station =

Railway station in Gujarat, India

Patan Railway Station
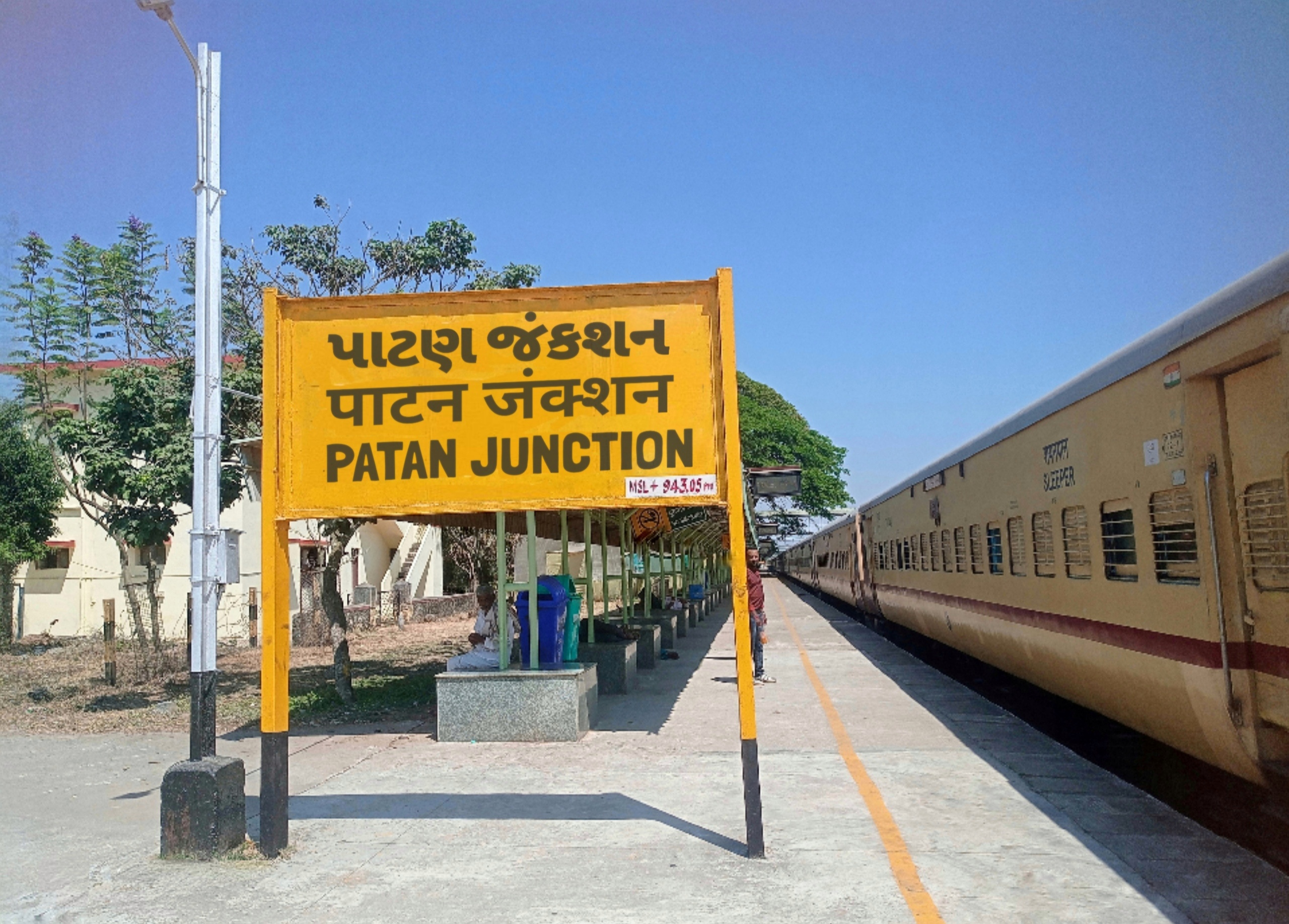

General information
- Location: Patan, Gujarat; India
- Coordinates: 23°51′11″N 72°07′53″E
- System: Indian Railways station
- Owner: Ministry of Railways, Indian Railways
- Operator: Western Railway
- Line: Mahesana-Patan line Patan-Bhildi line Patan - Palanpur line (Working)
- Platforms: 2
- Tracks: 4

Construction
- Structure type: Standard (on ground)
- Parking: Yes

Other information
- Status: Functioning (WiFi enabled)
- Station code: PTN
- Zone(s): Western Railway
- Division(s): Ahmedabad
Location
- Location within India Location within Gujarat
- Interactive map

Patan railway station is a major railway station in Patan district, Gujarat, India on the Western line of the Western Railway network. Patan railway station is 40 km far away from Mahesana Junction. Patan is well connected by rail to Mahesana Junction, Bhildi Junction and Ahmedabad Junction.

Patan is 108 km from Ahmedabad railway station. It is also connected by rail to Mehsana, Mumbai, Jodhpur and Okha. Work is in progress on Patan and Palanpur railway sections.

== Trains ==
The following trains halt at Patan railway station in both directions:

- Bhagat Ki Kothi–Bandra Terminus Express (via Bhildi)
- Bhagat Ki Kothi–Sabarmati Intercity Express
- Patan Mehsana Junction Passenger
- Sabarmati–Patan DEMU
- Patan–Ahmedabad Passenger
- Mumbai Dadar–Bhagat Ki Kothi Festival Special
- Dadar–Bikaner Festival Special
- Bhavnagar Terminus-Haridwar Express
- 12997/98 Bandra Terminus - Barmer Humsafar Express
- 21901/02 Bandra Terminus - Barmer Humsafar Express
