= Yesvantpur–Barmer AC Express =

Train in India

Yesvantpur Junction – Barmer AC Express

Overview
- Service type: AC Express
- First service: 5 May 2014; 12 years ago
- Current operator: North Western Railway

Route
- Termini: Barmer; Yesvantpur Junction
- Stops: 37
- Distance travelled: 2,251 km (1,399 mi)
- Average journey time: 53 hours 30 minutes
- Service frequency: Weekly.
- Train number: 14805 / 14806

On-board services
- Classes: AC First class, AC 2 Tier, AC 3 Tier
- Seating arrangements: No
- Sleeping arrangements: Yes
- Catering facilities: Available
- Observation facilities: Large windows
- Baggage facilities: No
- Other facilities: Below the seats

Technical
- Rolling stock: LHB coach
- Track gauge: 1,676 mm (5 ft 6 in)
- Operating speed: 130 km/h (81 mph) maximum, 44 km/h (27 mph) average including halts.
Route map
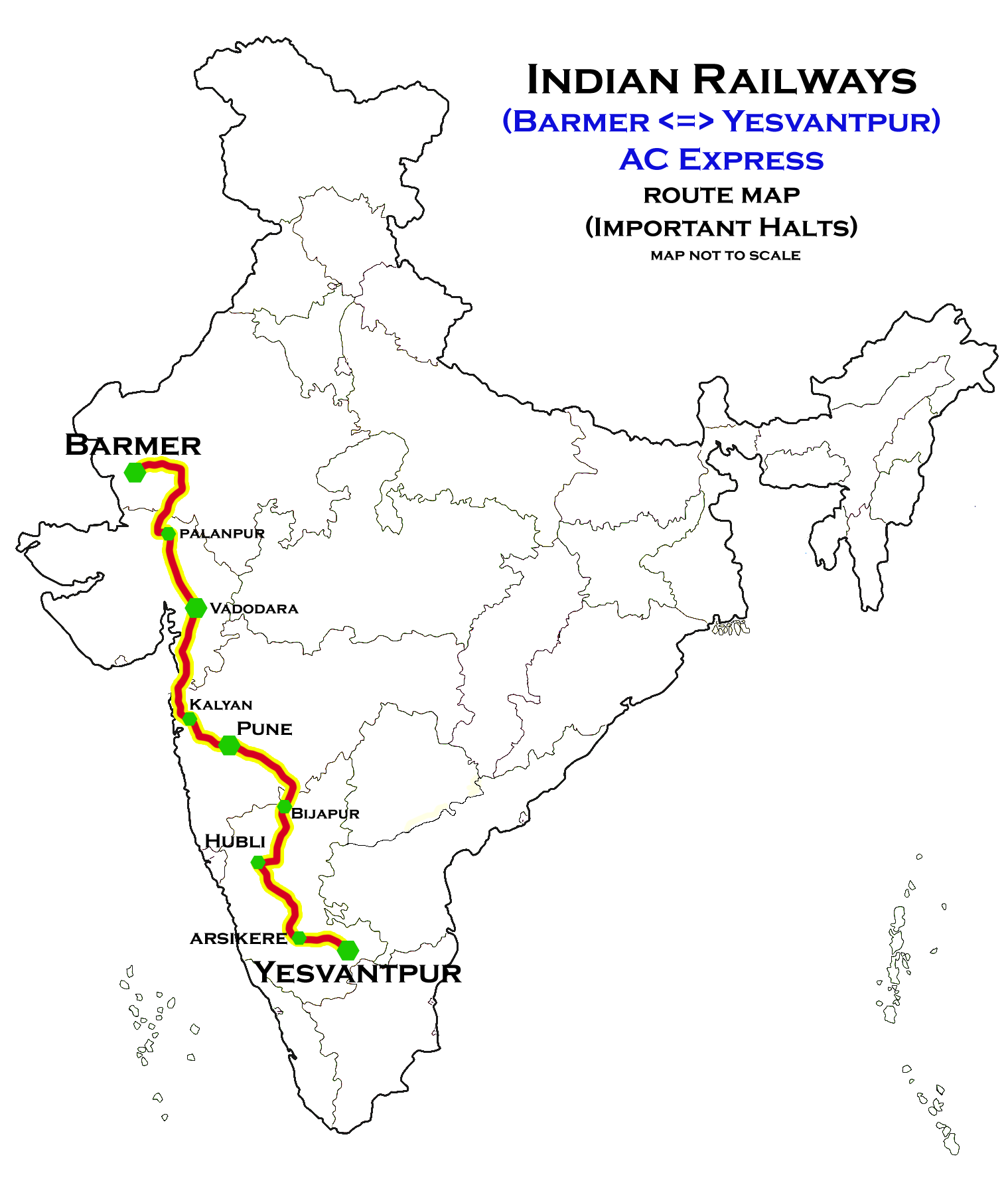

The 14806 / 14805 Yesvantpur-Barmer AC Express is an AC Express train belonging to Indian Railways – North Western Railway zone that runs between Barmer & Yesvantpur Junction in India.

It operates as train number 14806 from Barmer to Yesvantpur Junction and as train number 14805 in the reverse direction, serving the states of Rajasthan, Gujarat, Maharashtra & Karnataka.

It initially ran to / from Ahmedabad Junction being subsequently extended to Barmer.

The train before had ICF rakes of Rajdhani Express that have converted into LHB rakes. The LHB rakes are more secure than ICF rakes in safety manners.

== Coaches ==
The 14806 / 05 Barmer–Yesvantpur AC Express has 1 AC 1st Class, 3 AC 2 tier, 13 AC 3 tier & 2 End on Generator Coaches. In addition, it also carries a pantry car.

As is customary with most train services in India, coach composition may be amended at the discretion of Indian Railways depending on demand.

== Service ==
The 14806 Barmer–Yesvantpur AC Express covers the distance of 2,251 km (1,399 mi) in 50 hours 15 mins averaging 44.80 km/h (28 mph) & in 53 hours 30 mins as 14805 Yesvantpur–Barmer AC Express averaging 42.07 km/h (26 mph).

As the average speed of the train is below 55 km/h (34 mph), as per Indian Railways rules, its fare does not include a Superfast surcharge.

== Routeing ==
The 14806 / 05 Barmer–Yesvantpur AC Express runs from Barmer via Samdari Junction, Dhanera, Bhildi Junction, Palanpur Junction, Ahmedabad Junction, Vadodara Junction, Surat, Vasai Road, Kalyan Junction, Lonavala, Pune Junction, Solapur, Hubli Junction, Davanagere,Tumakuru, to Yesvantpur Junction.

It reverses direction of travel 5 times during its journey at Samdari Junction, Bhildi Junction, Palanpur Junction, Gadag Junction and Hubli Junction.

== Traction ==
As the entire route is fully electrified, an Vadodara-based WAP-5 hauls the train from Barmer to Yesvantpur and vice-versa .

Before February 2014, when the Central Line section was under 1500 V DC traction, it was hauled by a Kalyan-based WCAM 2/2P dual-traction locomotive between Vadodara Junction and Pune Junction. Or even they have diesel traction with WDM-3A and WDP-4D in 2018

== Operation ==
- 14805 Yesvantpur–Barmer AC Express runs from Yesvantpur Junction every Monday reaching Barmer on the 3rd day.
- 14806 Barmer–Yesvantpur AC Express runs from Barmer every Friday reaching Yesvantpur Junction on the 3rd day.
