= Dadar–Bhuj Superfast Express =

Train in India

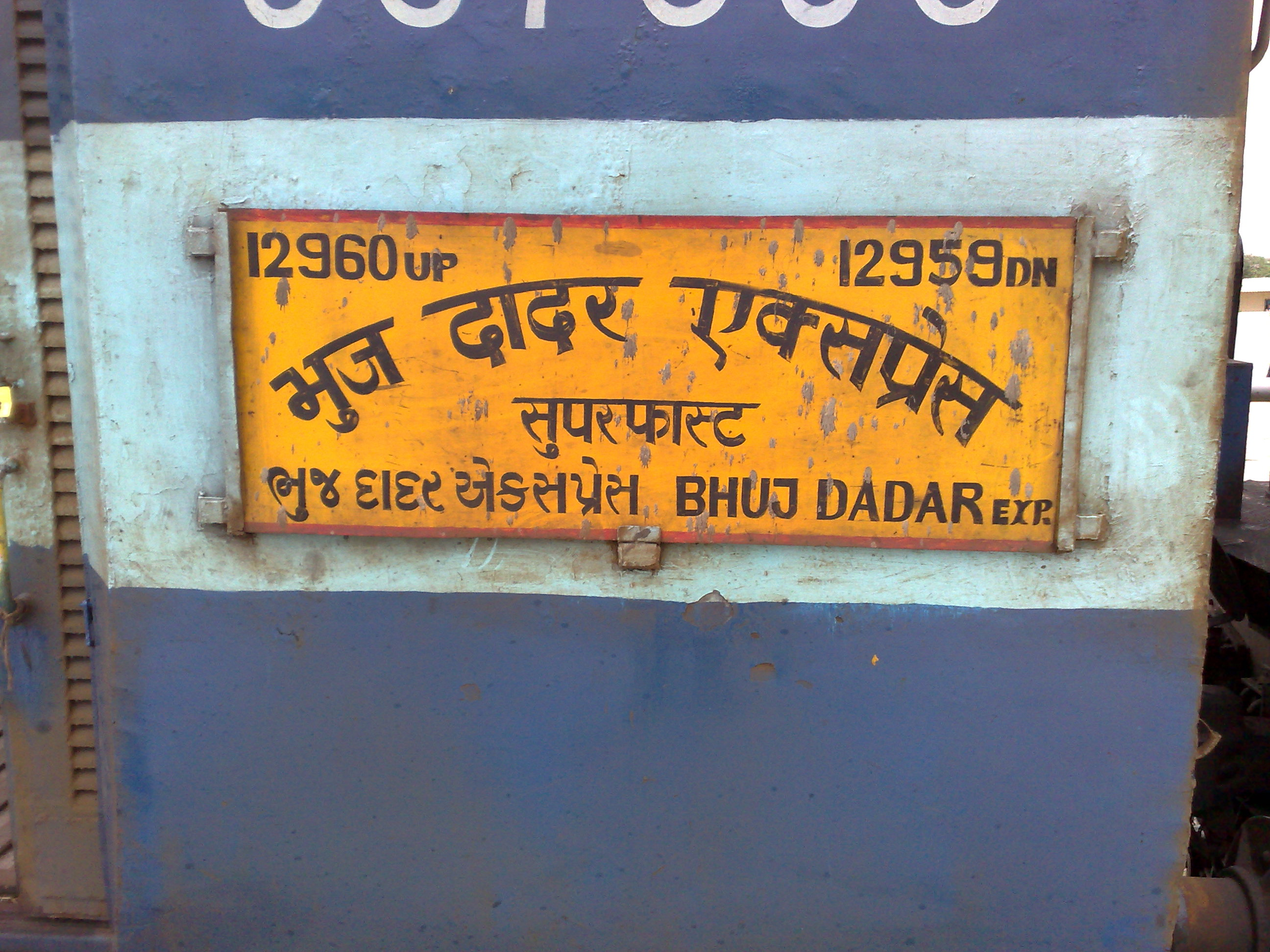

Overview
- Service type: Superfast Express
- Locale: Maharashtra, Gujarat
- First service: 12 November 2011
- Current operator: Western Railways

Route
- Termini: Bhuj; Dadar
- Stops: 18
- Distance travelled: 977 km (607 mi)
- Average journey time: 17 hours 45 minutes
- Service frequency: 12960 Bhuj–Dadar Superfast Express – Monday & Thursday, 12959 Dadar–Bhuj Superfast Express – Wednesday & Saturday
- Train number: 12959 / 12960

On-board services
- Classes: AC 2 tier, AC 3 tier, Sleeper class, General Unreserved
- Seating arrangements: Yes
- Sleeping arrangements: Yes
- Catering facilities: No pantry Attached
- Observation facilities: No rake sharing

Technical
- Rolling stock: LHB Coaches
- Track gauge: 1,676 mm (5 ft 6 in)
- Operating speed: 110 km/h (68 mph) maximum 55.43 km/h (34 mph), including halts
Route map
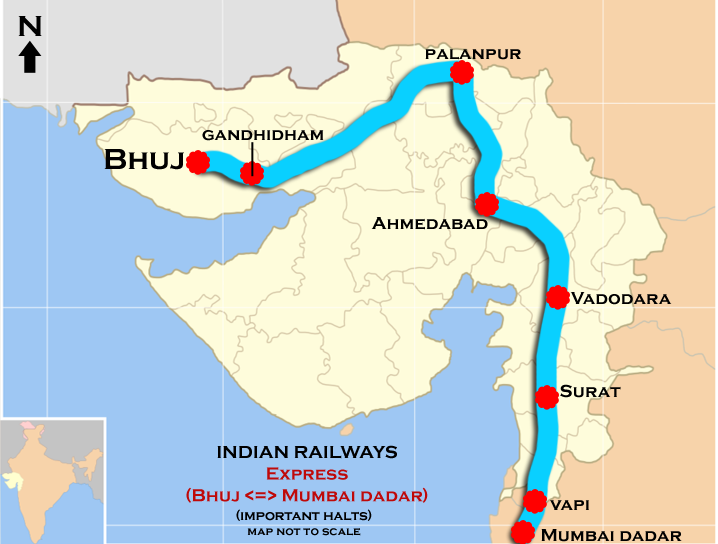

The 12959/12960 Dadar–Bhuj Superfast Express is a Superfast Express train belonging to Indian Railways that runs between Bhuj and Mumbai in India. It is a 2 days a week service. It operates as train number 12959 from Dadar to Bhuj and as train number 12960 in the reverse direction.

== Coaches ==
The 12959/60 Bhuj–Dadar Superfast Express presently has 2 AC 2 tier, 6 AC 3 tier, 8 Sleeper class & 4 General Unreserved coaches. As with most train services in India, coach composition may be amended at the discretion of Indian Railways depending on demand.

== Service ==
The 12959/60 Bhuj–Dadar Superfast Express was first introduced on 12 November 2011. Presently it is a bi-weekly service. It operates via the newly constructed Palanpur line on the Mumbai–Bhuj route.

It covers the distance of 977 kilometres in 17 hours 45 mins as 12959 Dadar–Bhuj Superfast Express (55.04 km/h) and 17 hours 30 mins as 12960 Bhuj–Dadar Superfast Express (55.83 km/h). As its average speed in both directions is above 55 km/h as per Indian Railways rules, it has a Superfast surcharge.

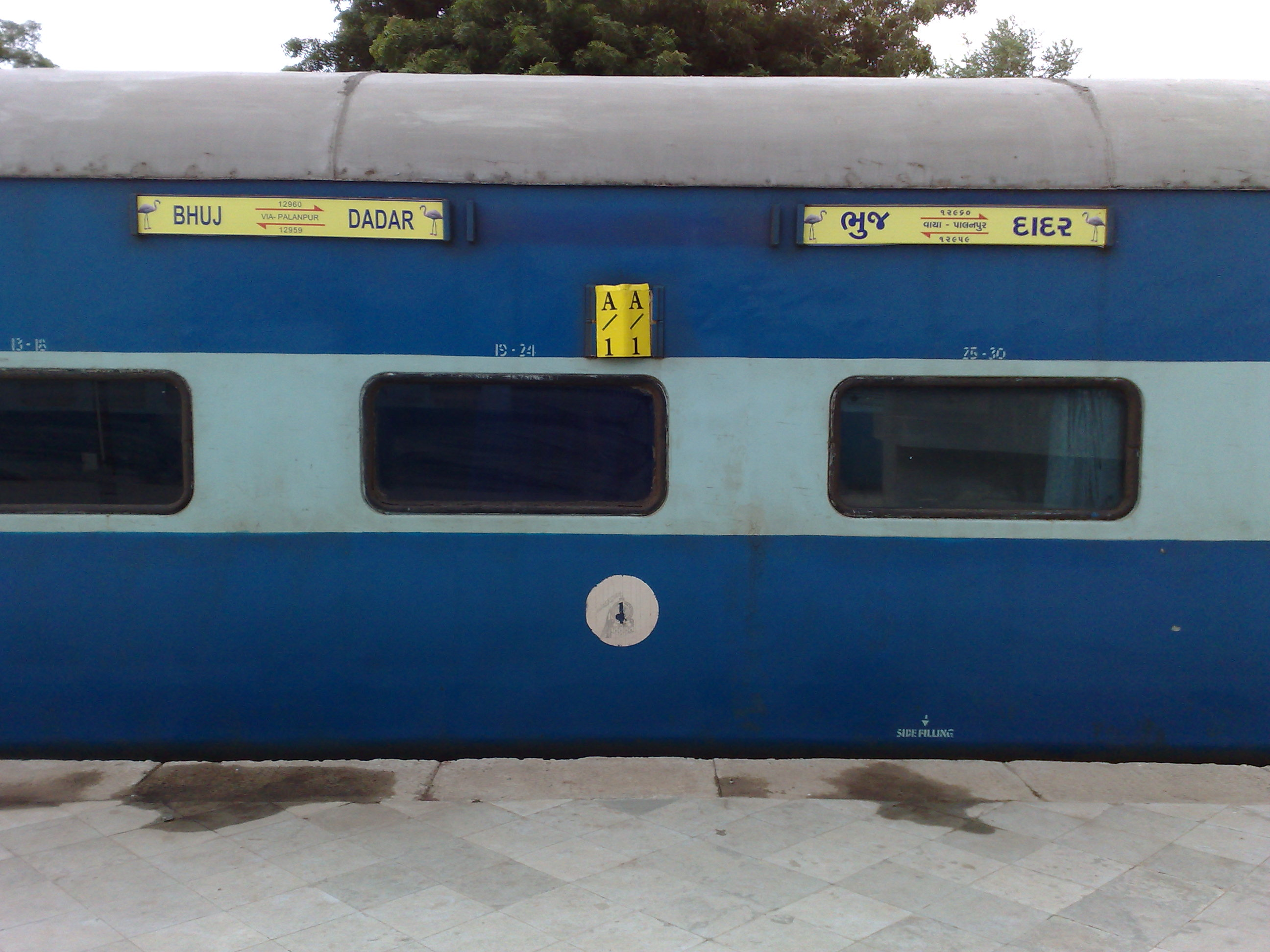
12959 Dadar–Bhuj Superfast Express – AC 2 tier coach

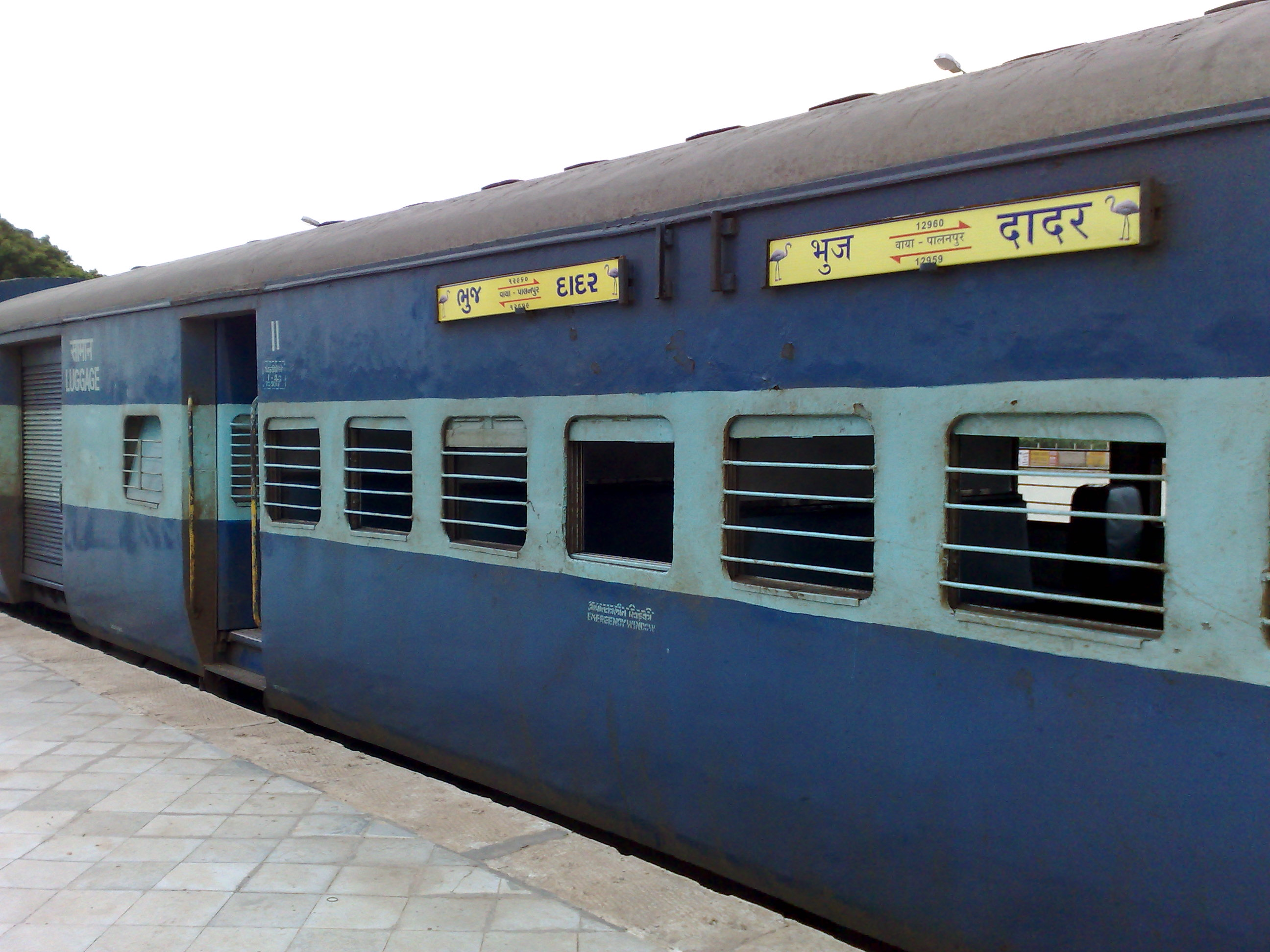
12959 Dadar–Bhuj Superfast Express – Sleeper coach

== Traction ==
Dual-traction WCAM-1 OR WCAM-2/2P locos would haul the train until Ahmedabad Junction after which a Vatva or Ratlam-based WDM-3A would take over until Bhuj.

As Western Railways switched over to AC system in February 2012, it is now hauled by a WAP-4 or WAP-5 engine from the Vadodara shed from Dadar to Bhuj.

It reverses direction twice on its run. These reversals occur at Palanpur Junction & Gandhidham Junction

== Time table ==
12960 Bhuj–Dadar Superfast Express leaves Bhuj every Monday & Thursday at 18:30 hrs IST and reaches Dadar at 12:00 hrs IST the next day.

On return, the 12959 Dadar–Bhuj Superfast Express leaves Dadar every Wednesday & Saturday at 00:05 hrs IST and reaches Bhuj at 17:45 hrs IST the same day.

Station code	Station name	12959 – Dadar to Bhuj		Distance from source in km	Day	12960 – Bhuj to Bhuj		Distance from source in km	Day
Station code	Station name	Arrival	Departure	Distance from source in km	Day	Arrival	Departure	Distance from source in km	Day
DDR	Dadar	Source	00:05	0	1	12:00	Destination	977	2
BSR	Vasai Road	00:53	00:56	42	1	11:02	11:05	936	2
ST	Surat	04:15	04:20	257	1	08:15	08:20	721	2
BRC	Vadodara Junction	06:05	06:10	386	1	06:25	06:30	592	2
ANND	Anand Junction	06:43	06:45	422	1	05:40	05:42	556	2
ND	Nadiad Junction	07:01	07:03	440	1	05:20	05:22	538	2
ADI	Ahmedabad Junction	08:05	08:25	486	1	04:20	04:40	492	2
MSH	Mahesana Junction	09:46	09:48	554	1	02:36	02:38	424	2
PNU	Palanpur Junction	10:50	11:15	619	1	01:05	01:32	359	2
DISA	Disa	11:35	11:37	646	1	23:53	23:55	332	1
BLDI	Bhildi	11:53	11:55	664	1	23:37	23:39	314	1
DEOR	Diyodar	12:14	12:16	690	1	23:12	23:14	287	1
RDHP	Radhanpur	12:52	12:54	732	1	22:38	22:40	246	1
SLLR	Santalpur	13:22	13:24	775	1	22:04	22:06	203	1
SIOB	Samakhiali	15:05	15:07	866	1	20:50	20:52	111	1
BCOB	Bhachau BG	15:21	15:23	882	1	20:21	20:23	95	1
GIMB	Gandhidham Junction	16:10	16:30	919	1	19:25	19:50	58	1
BHUJ	Bhuj	17:50	Destination	977	1	Source	18:30	0	1
