= Palanpur–Bhuj Intercity Express =

Train in India

Overview
- Service type: Express
- Locale: Gujarat
- Current operator(s): Western Railway

Route
- Termini: Palanpur (PNU); Bhuj (BHUJ)
- Stops: 11
- Distance travelled: 359 km (223 mi)
- Average journey time: 6 hours 30 minutes
- Service frequency: Daily
- Train number(s): 19151/19152

On-board services
- Class(es): General Unreserved
- Seating arrangements: Yes
- Sleeping arrangements: No
- Catering facilities: E-catering
- Observation facilities: Large windows
- Baggage facilities: No
- Other facilities: Below the seats

Technical
- Rolling stock: ICF coach
- Track gauge: 1,676 mm (5 ft 6 in)
- Operating speed: 55 km/h (34 mph) average including halts

Palanpur–Bhuj Intercity Express is an Express train belonging to Western Railway zone that runs between Palanpur Junction and Bhuj in India. It is currently being operated with 19151/19152 train numbers on a daily basis. Initially, train ran between Palanpur Junction and Gandhidham Junction. W.e.f 15-08-2018, It has been extended up to Bhuj based on demand of passenger.

== Service ==
- 19151/Palanpur–Bhuj Intercity Express has an average speed of 46 km/h and covers 359 km in 7h 50m.
- 19152/Bhuj–Palanpur Intercity Express has an average speed of 45 km/h and covers 359 km in 8h.

== Route ==
19151/52 Palanpur–Bhuj DAMU INTERCITY ELOTRONIC y Express route is via Bhildi Junction, Radhanpur, Samakhiali Junction, Gandhidham Junction.

== Coach composition ==
The train has standard ICF rakes with max speed of 110 kmph. The train consists of 12 coaches:

- 10 General Unreserved
- 2 Seating cum Luggage Rake

== Traction ==
Both trains are hauled by a Vatva Loco Shed WAP-4E electric locomotive from Palanpur to Bhuj and vice versa.

== Rake sharing ==
The train shares its rake with 59425/59426 Gandhidham–Palanpur Passenger.

== See also ==
- Palanpur Junction railway station
- Bhuj railway station
- Gandhidham–Palanpur Passenger
