= Shri Ganganagar–Dadar Superfast Express =

Train in India

Shri Ganganagar-Dadar Superfast Express

Overview
- Service type: Superfast
- Locale: Rajasthan, Gujarat & Maharashtra
- Current operator: North Western Railway

Route
- Termini: Shri Ganganagar Junction (SGNR); Dadar (DDR)
- Stops: 26
- Distance travelled: 1,545 km (960 mi)
- Average journey time: 27 hours 10 minutes
- Service frequency: Bi-weekly.
- Train number: 12489 / 12490

On-board services
- Classes: AC 2 Tier, AC 3 Tier, Sleeper Class, General Unreserved
- Seating arrangements: Yes
- Sleeping arrangements: Yes
- Catering facilities: On-board catering, E-catering
- Observation facilities: Large windows
- Baggage facilities: No
- Other facilities: Below the seats

Technical
- Rolling stock: LHB coach
- Track gauge: 1,676 mm (5 ft 6 in)
- Operating speed: 130 km/h (81 mph) maximum, 57 km/h (35 mph) average including halts.

The 12489 / 12490 Shri Ganganagar–Dadar Superfast Express is a superfast express train belonging to Indian Railways – North Western Railway zone that runs between Shri Ganganagar Junction and Dadar in India.

It operates as train number 12489 from Shri Ganganagar Junction to Dadar and as train number 12490 in the reverse direction serving the states of Rajasthan, Gujarat & Maharashtra.

== Coaches ==
The 12489 /12490 Shri Ganganagar–Dadar Superfast Express presently has 1 AC 2 tier, 6 AC 3 tier, 10 Sleeper Class, 4 Second Class seating & 2 SLR (Seating cum Luggage Rake) coaches. It does not have a pantry car.

As with most train services in India, coach composition may be amended at the discretion of Indian Railways depending on demand.

== Service ==
12489 Shri Ganganagar–Dadar Superfast Express covers the distance of 1545 kilometres in 27 hours 10 mins (57 km/h).

12490 Dadar–Shri Ganganagar Superfast Express covers the distance of 1545 kilometres in 26 hours 55 mins (57 km/h).

As the average speed of the train is above 57 km/h, as per Indian Railways rules, its fare includes a Superfast surcharge.

== Routeing ==
The train runs from Shri Ganganagar via Suratgarh Junction, Lunkaransar, Bikaner Junction, Nagaur, Merta Road Junction, Jodhpur, Dhanera, Bhildi Junction, Ahmedabad Junction, Anand Junction, Vadodara Junction, Surat, Palghar, Borivali to Dadar.

== Traction ==
As the route is fully electrified, it is hauled by a Vadodara Loco Shed-based WAP-5 or WAP-7 electric locomotive on ots entire journey.

== Timings ==
12489 Shri Ganganagar–Dadar Superfast Express leaves Bikaner Junction every Tuesday & Saturday at 13:50 hrs IST and reaches Dadar at 12:00 hrs IST the next day.

12490 Dadar–Shri Ganganagar Superfast Express leaves Dadar every Wednesday & Sunday at 14:35 hrs IST and reaches Bikaner Junction at 13:10 hrs IST the next day.
