= Gandhidham–Palanpur section =

Railway line in Gujarat, India

Overview
- Status: Operational
- Owner: Indian Railways
- Locale: Gujarat
- Termini: Gandhidham; Palanpur

Service
- Operator: Western Railway

History
- Opened: 1952

Technical
- Track length: 301 km (187 mi)
- Number of tracks: 1
- Track gauge: 5 ft 6 in (1,676 mm) broad gauge
- Electrification: Yes

The Gandhidham–Palanpur section belongs to the Western Railway of Kutch district of Gujarat state.

== History ==
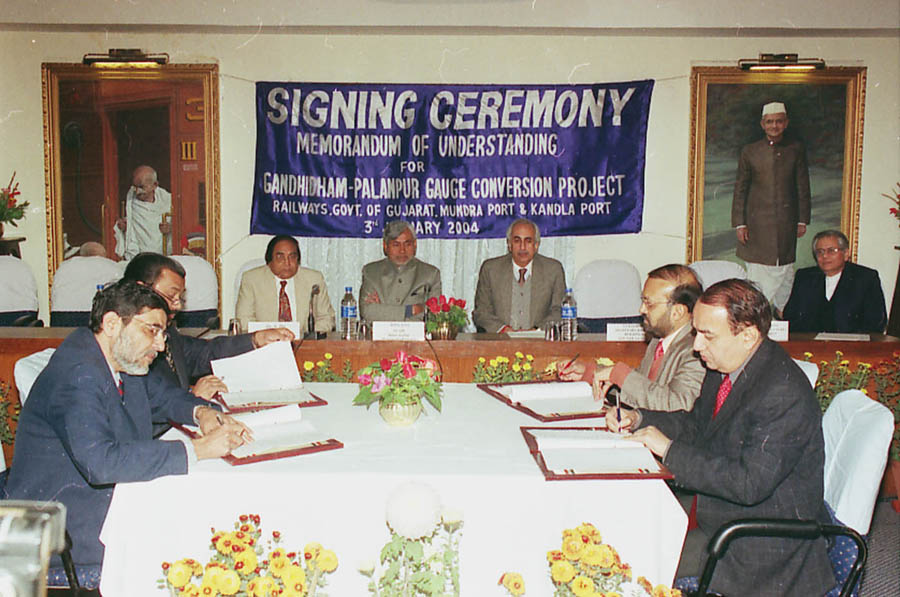
Signature of MoU between the Government of Gujarat, Kandla Port Trust and Mundra Port for implementation of Gandhidham – Palanpur Gauge Conversion Project

The railway was financed by the Maharao Khengarji Bawa of Cutch State. 15 miles from Anjar to Kandla was opened in 1930. Another line was construction started from Kandla to Disa in 1950 with a cost of 5.5 crores. Gandhidham–Disa section was opened in 1952 by the then-president Rajendra Prasad. The gauge conversion of this line was completed on 24 March 2006. The Gauge conversion of Gandhidham–Palanpur section was the first long-distance line conversion under SPV section.

== Prominence ==
The 301 km Gandhidham–Palanpur section connects the Gulf of Kutch with the Delhi–Ahmedabad mainline. This line is providing connectivity for North India with Kandla and GAPL's Mundra ports. The distance between Delhi and the Kutch region has been reduced by 114 km.

== Freight service ==
It is a dedicated freight corridor for Western Gujarat. The Kandla and Mundra ports, local salt industry, Indian Oil Corporation's depot, and Iffco's fertilizer plant at Kandla is benefited from this line for freight services. The first Python goods train of Western Railway plied on this section on 12 April 2011.

== Doubling ==
The doubling and electrification of Gandhidham–Palanpur section is likely to be completed in the next five years in 2025 in the 13th five-year plan period.
