= Bhagat Ki Kothi railway station =

Railway station in Rajasthan, India

Bhagat Ki Kothi

General information
- Location: Jodhpur, Rajasthan; India
- Coordinates: 26.2508°N 73.0146°E
- Elevation: 241.000 metres (790.682 ft)
- System: Express train and Passenger train station
- Owner: Indian Railways
- Operator: North Western Railway zone
- Line: Jodhpur–Luni section
- Platforms: 3
- Tracks: 7
- Connections: Taxi stand, Auto rickshaw

Construction
- Structure type: Standard (on-ground station)
- Parking: Yes
- Cycle facilities: Yes

Other information
- Status: Functioning
- Station code: BGKT
- Zone(s): North Western Railway zone
- Division(s): Jodhpur

History
- Opened: 1972
- Former names: Jodhpur–Bikaner Railway
Location
- Location within India Location within Rajasthan

Bhagat Ki Kothi railway station is a railway station on the North Western Railways network in the state of Rajasthan. It is located approximately 3 km from Jodhpur Junction.

== History ==
The station is the point of origin of the Thar Express train service that connects Karachi, Pakistan to Jodhpur, India.

In February 2006, the station was revived after a period of 41 years. In the meantime the lines on both sides had been converted from metre gauge to broad gauge. This enabled the train to run from the border right up to Karachi, which was not possible earlier because there would be a change of gauge in between, either at Hyderabad or Mirpur Khas. The Thar Express is the oldest route, however, because it was damaged in the war it remained closed for 41 years. Upon restoration it became the new train service between the two countries.

Jodhpur–Bikaner Railway was merged with the Western Railway on 5 November 1951. Later North Western Railway came into existence on 1 October 2002.

== Diesel Loco Shed, Bhagat Ki Kothi ==
A Diesel Loco Shed which was established in 1972 is located close by the station.

Serial No.	Locomotive Class	Horsepower	Quantity
1.	WDP-4/4D	4000/4500	93
2.	WDG-4/4D	4000/4500	29
3.	WAP-7	6350	102
4.	WAG-9	6120	103
Total Locomotives Active as of November 2026			327

== See also ==
- Jodhpur Junction
- http://www.indianrailways.gov.in/railwayboard/uploads/directorate/mec_engg/downloads/DLS/NWR/BGKTShed_history.pdf
