= Samdari Junction railway station =

Railway station in Rajasthan, India

Samdari Junction

General information
- Location: Samdari, Barmer district, Rajasthan; India
- Coordinates: 25.837239°N 72.574794°E
- System: Indian Railways station
- Owner: Indian Railways
- Operator: North Western Railway
- Line: Marwar Junction–Munabao line
- Platforms: 3
- Tracks: 3
- Connections: Auto stand

Construction
- Structure type: Standard (on ground station)
- Parking: No
- Cycle facilities: No

Other information
- Status: Functioning
- Station code: SMR
- Zone(s): North Western Railway
- Division(s): Jodhpur
Location
- Location within India Location within Rajasthan

Samdari Junction is a railway station in Barmer district, Rajasthan, India. Its code is SMR. It serves Samdari town. The station consists of 3 platforms. Passenger, Express and Superfast trains halt here.
