= Palanpur Junction railway station =

Railway Station in Gujarat, India

Palanpur Junction
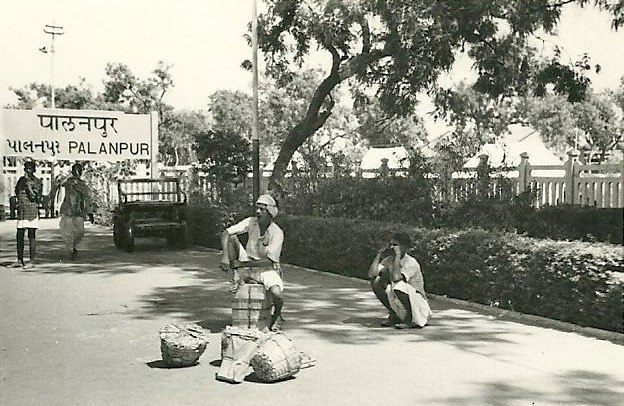
- Palanpur railway station, 1952

General information
- Location: Palanpur, Banaskantha district, Gujarat; India
- Coordinates: 24°10′28″N 72°25′50″E
- Elevation: 261 m (856 ft)
- System: Indian Railways station
- Owner: Indian Railways
- Operator: Western Railway
- Lines: New Delhi–Ahmedabad main line, Gandhidham–Palanpur section
- Platforms: 5
- Tracks: 7
- Connections: State Transport (GSRTC), Taxi stand

Construction
- Parking: Available

Other information
- Status: Functioning
- Station code: PNU
- Zone(s): Western Railway Zone
- Division(s): Ahmedabad
Location
- Location within India Location within Gujarat

Palanpur Junction railway station is a major railway station located in Palanpur, Gujarat, India. The railway station is under the administrative control of Western Railway of Indian Railways. Palanpur Junction railway station has five platforms and a total of six tracks.

== Overview ==
Palanpur Junction railway station, on the Delhi–Ahmedabad main line, comes under the administrative control of Western Railway zone of the Indian Railways. It has direct rail links on the broad gauge to the cities of Chennai, Thiruvananthapuram, Mysore, Bangalore, Pune, Mumbai, Jaipur, Jodhpur, Delhi, Dehradun, Muzaffarpur, Bareilly and Jammu. It is connected to most of the cities and towns in Gujarat such as Ahmedabad, Surat, Vadodra, Bhuj, Rajkot, Jamnagar, Veraval, Porbandar, Bhavnagar and Gandhidham. Indian Railways' proposal to double the broad-gauge line between Palanpur and Samakhiali has received government backing. The doubling will benefit the districts of Kutch, Patan and Banaskantha in the state of Gujarat.

== Trains ==
The following trains halt at Palanpur Junction railway station in both directions:

Train Number	Train Name
14893/94	Palanpur-Bhagat ki kothi Mail/Express
19405/06	Palanpur-Gandhidham Express
20927/28	Palanpur-Bhuj Intercity Express
14311/12	Ala Hazrat Express (via Mahesana)
14321/22	Ala Hazrat Express (via Bhildi)
12959/60	Bandra Terminus–Bhuj Weekly Superfast Express
12965/66	Bandra Terminus–Bhuj Weekly Superfast Express
20823/24	Puri–Ajmer Superfast Express
20983/84	Bhuj–Delhi Sarai Rohilla Superfast Express
12461/62	Jodhpur–Sabarmati (Ahmedabad) Vande Bharat Express
20485/86	Jodhpur–Sabarmati Intercity Express
12489/90	Shri Ganganagar–Dadar Superfast Express
05045/46	Lalkua–Rajkot Puja Special
12997/98	Bandra Terminus-Barmer Hamsafar Express
20625/26	Chennai Central–Bhagat Ki Kothi Superfast Express

== See also ==
- Dhanera railway station
- Gandhidham Junction railway station
- Bhuj railway station
