= Rapar =

City in Gujarat, India

Rapar Vagad
- city
- Location in Gujarat, India Rapar (India)
- Coordinates: 23.573°N 70.6445°E
- Country: India
- State: Gujarat
- District: Kutch

Government
  - MLA: Virendrasinh Jadeja
- Elevation: 79 m (259 ft)

Population (2024)
  - Total: 253,137

Languages
  - Official: Kutchi, Gujarati
- Time zone: UTC+5:30 (IST)
- PIN: 370 165
- Telephone code: 02830
- Vehicle registration: GJ-39
- Website: gujaratindia.com

Rapar is a city and a municipality in Kutch district (Kachchh) in the Indian state of Gujarat.

== Geography ==
Rapar (earlier known as Rahpar) is located at 23.57°N 70.63°E. It has an average elevation of 79 metres (259 feet). Rapar is the main town in the Vagad Region of the Kutch District and the easternmost town of the Kutch District.

It is a trading hub and shopping center for local people as there is no other major town within a 100 km radius. The nearest towns are Samakhiyali, Bhachau, Gandhidham, Anjar, Kandla and Adipur in Kutch district, and Morbi in Rajkot district and Radhanpur in Patan district. The district headquarters, Bhuj, is almost 140 km to the west. The nearest railway station is Chhitrod which is 18 km away. The nearest airport is Gandhidham which is 94.5 km away.

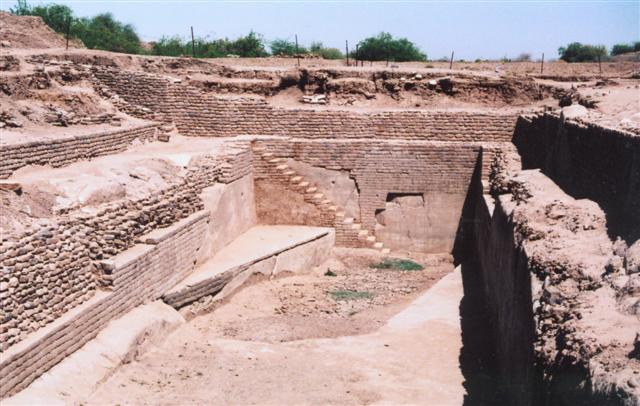
Dholavira

The nearby villages are Gagodar, Chhotapar, Pragpar, Bhutakiya, Bhimasar, Selari, Badargadh, Vajepar, Kidiyanagar, Padampar, Kalyanpar, Rav, Palanpar, Nandasar, Bela, Jatawada, Davri, Balasar Palanswa and others.

Rapar is nearest town en route to Dholavira, the Harappan civilization site.

Rapar was partially destroyed during the 2001 Gujarat earthquake but it has been developed again with good planning.

It has many temples like Swaminarayan Temple dedicated to Swaminarayana, Ratneswar Temple dedicated to Shiva, Ram Mandir dedicated to Rama, Dariyasthan dedicated to Dariyalal and two nice ponds and a public garden.

The famous Ravechi temple is situated in the Nana Raava Village in Rapar District of Gujarat in Kutch. For Ravechi Fair Gujarat more than 50,000 people assemble, mainly Charan, Ahir and Rabari community people to grant the offerings to Ravechi Mata. During this Ravechi Fair Gujarat celebration, newly married couples of Ahir community come dressed in their traditional wedding outfits to take blessings from Ravechi Mata.

== Politics ==
Current MLA of Rapar is Shree Virendrasinh Jadeja member of Bhartiya Janta Party who won by mere 450 votes against INC's Bhachubhai Arethiya during 2022 Gujarat assembly elections.
