= Palanswa =

Coordinates: 23°28′N 70°56′E

Palanswa Palansva
- Village
- Interactive map of Palanswa
- Country: India
- State: Gujarat
- District: Kutch
- Named for: Palas is the Butea monosperma, Van means Forest. "Forest of Palas trees" which existed prior to the settlement

Government
  - Social President (Nagar sheth): Shri Himmatbhai Nagarlal Kothari
- Elevation: 30 m (98 ft)

Population
  - Total: 10,000
- Time zone: UTC+5:30 (IST)
- Postal Code: 370157
- STD: 02806
- Website: gujaratindia.com

Palanswa or Palansva is a village of Vaghela Royal kingdom in Gujarat, India.Its one and only Vaghela Jagir(Kingdom) in kutch others are of Jadeja's Jagir(Kingdom). The Palasva's Fort have permission of Jail. Palasva also known as King Meghrajsinh Vaghela's place and palace. It lies in the Kutch district in the Taluka of Raapar. The village is located on Indian National Highway No 8A.

== History ==
Palanswa is an old village. There is a large lake at the beginning of the town near the bus station. The entire town is on small hill and one main road (Market) leads to the market, with many streets on both the side of main market, called vaas.

Situated in the middle of the main market is the Hindu temple shree pingalshyam ji temple (Brahmin),Jain temple Derasar and the Upashray. The main idol of the god Shri Shantinath Dada is located here. The temple was first time founded by SHETH SHRI KOTHARI RAJA VALJI. This temple was destroyed in an earthquake in 2001. A new temple was made in 2009 by Shri Visa Shrimali Shwetambar Murtipujak Tapagachchh Jain Sangh.

There are chakreshwari devi temple in the village which is family deity of Kothari Raja Valji family. (કોઠારી રાજા વાલજી પરિવાર કુળદેવી નુ મંદિર)

== People ==
The community consists mainly of: Royal Rajput, Jain Baniya, Prajapati. Sanchihar ( sachora ) Brahmin

Kothari, Mehta and Doshi are the major surnames in the Jain community of Planswa. This is a business class community and most of the people are settled outside.

Gujarati is a main language.

== Educational Facilities ==
There are two primary school and one government High School for Gujarati Medium.

== Transportation Facilities ==
Daily Bus services are available to important stations of the state, as well as to some local stations of the district.

The nearest Main Railway station is Samakhiyali which is 50 km away. Samakhiyali is well connected with the other railway stations of the country.

The nearest airports are Galpadar and Bhuj which are approx 120 km away from Palansva.

== Wildlife ==
In 2005, two large colonies of spoonbills were discovered near Palanswa and Deshalpar by students of Manjal Government High School.
