= Bhai Pratap Dialdas =

Indian businessman, philanthropist and freedom fighter

Bhai Pratap (Sindhi: ڀائي پرتاب ڏيئل داس;April 14, 1908 – August 30, 1967), was an Indian businessman, philanthropist and freedom fighter, best remembered as the founder of the city of Gandhidham to resettle refugees from Sindh after the partition of India and the creation of Pakistan in August 1947.

Pratap Moolchand Dialdas was born in Hyderabad, Bombay Presidency, British India on 14 April 1908 into an affluent family. Bhai Pratap was widely travelled and had established his businesses in India as well as internationally. His ethnic as well as international taste is reflected amply in Pratab Mahal, which also had a huge library with books from around the world. After the partition of India, he left along with his family for Bombay, India, and established a city for the displaced Sindhi Hindus. Actually it was two twin cities that he founded one next to the other by the names of Gandhidham and Adipur, as well as the Kandla Port, in Kutch.

Bhai Pratap died at the age of 59 in London on August 30, 1967. His body was brought to Adipur and cremated in the Nat Mandir compound where his samadhi was built adjacent to the Gandhi Samadhi. His children were Nirmala Pathwardhan (nee Dialdas) and Aruna Jagtiani (Wife of Suresh Jagtiani)

== Gallery ==
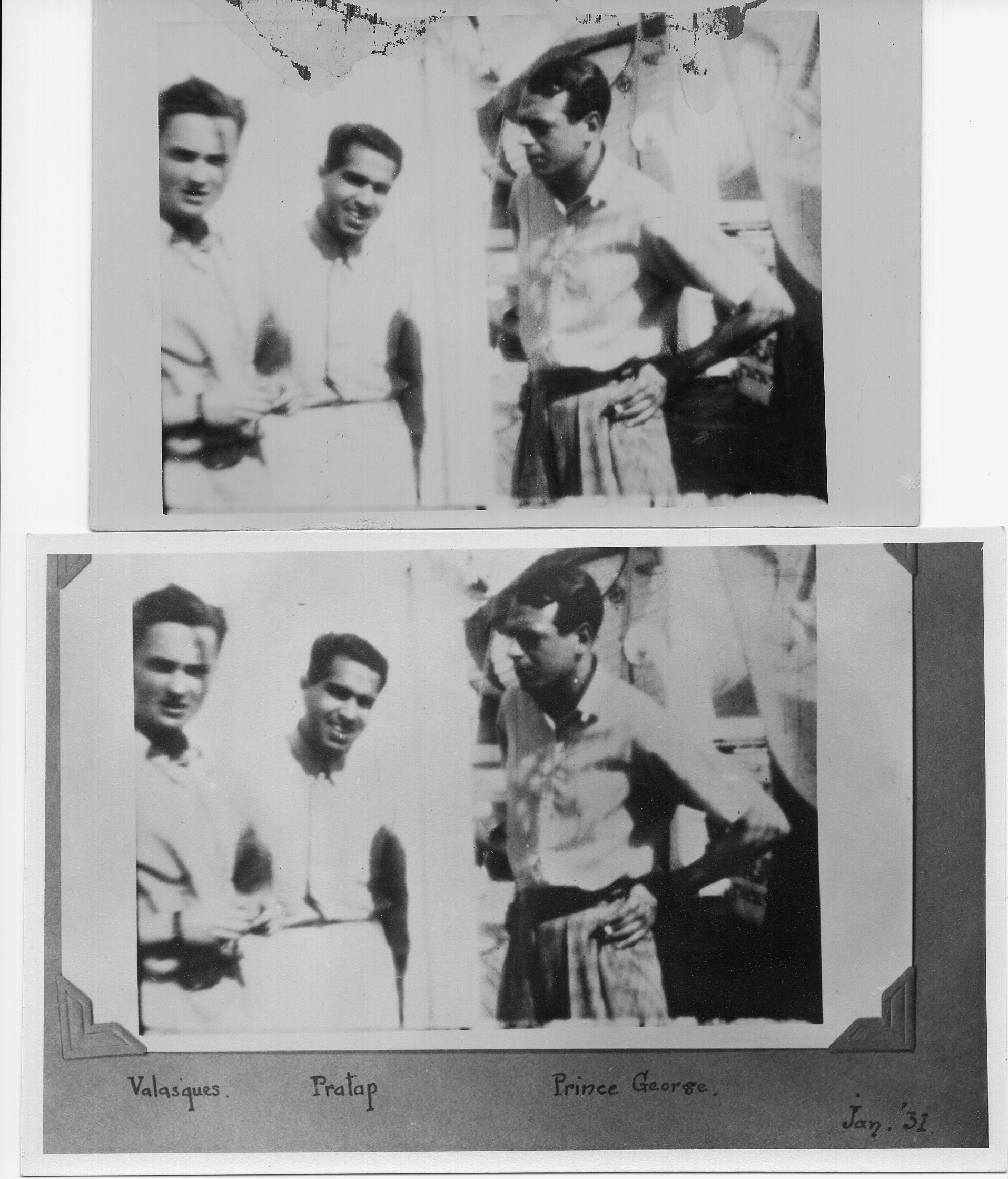

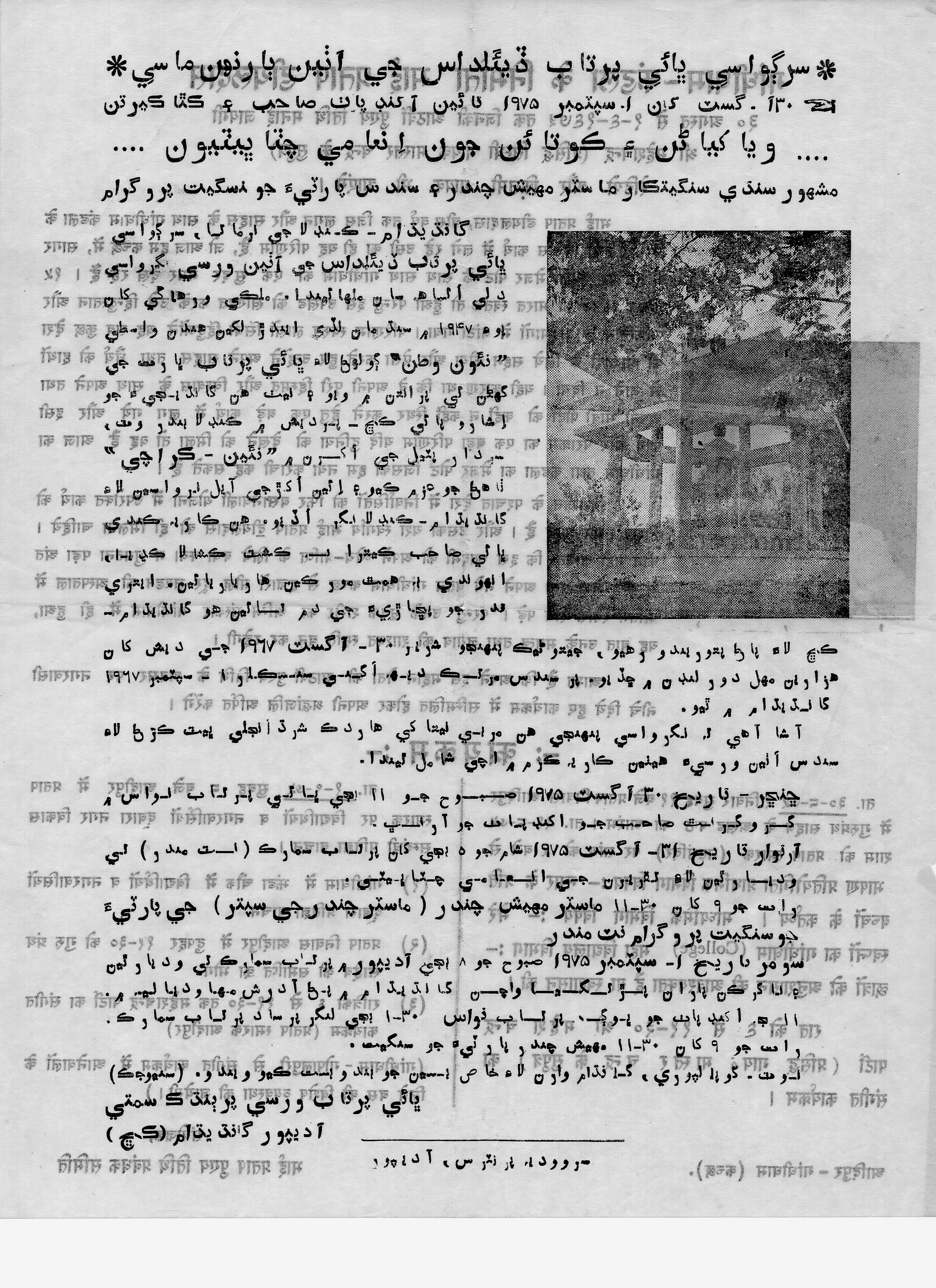

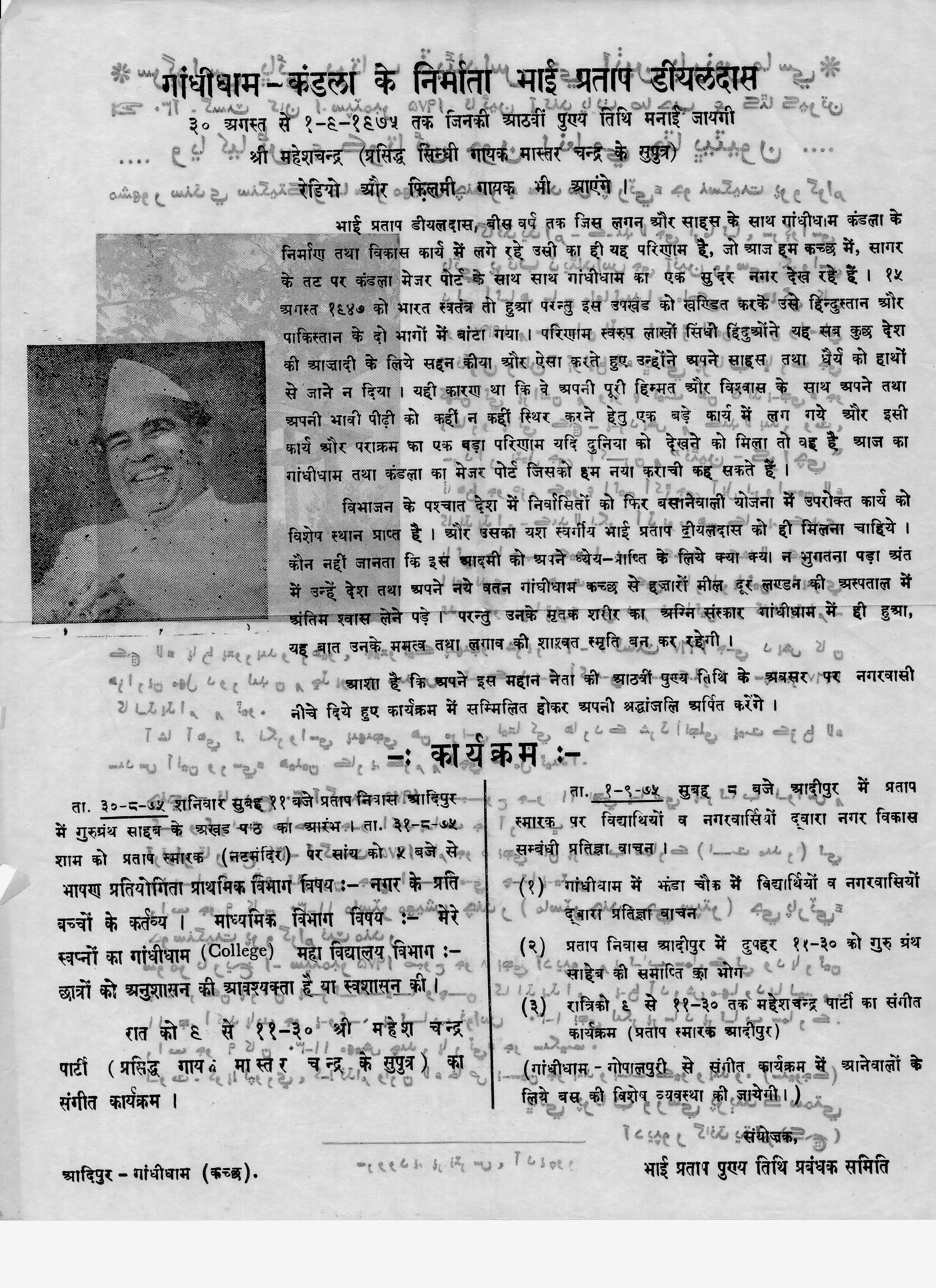

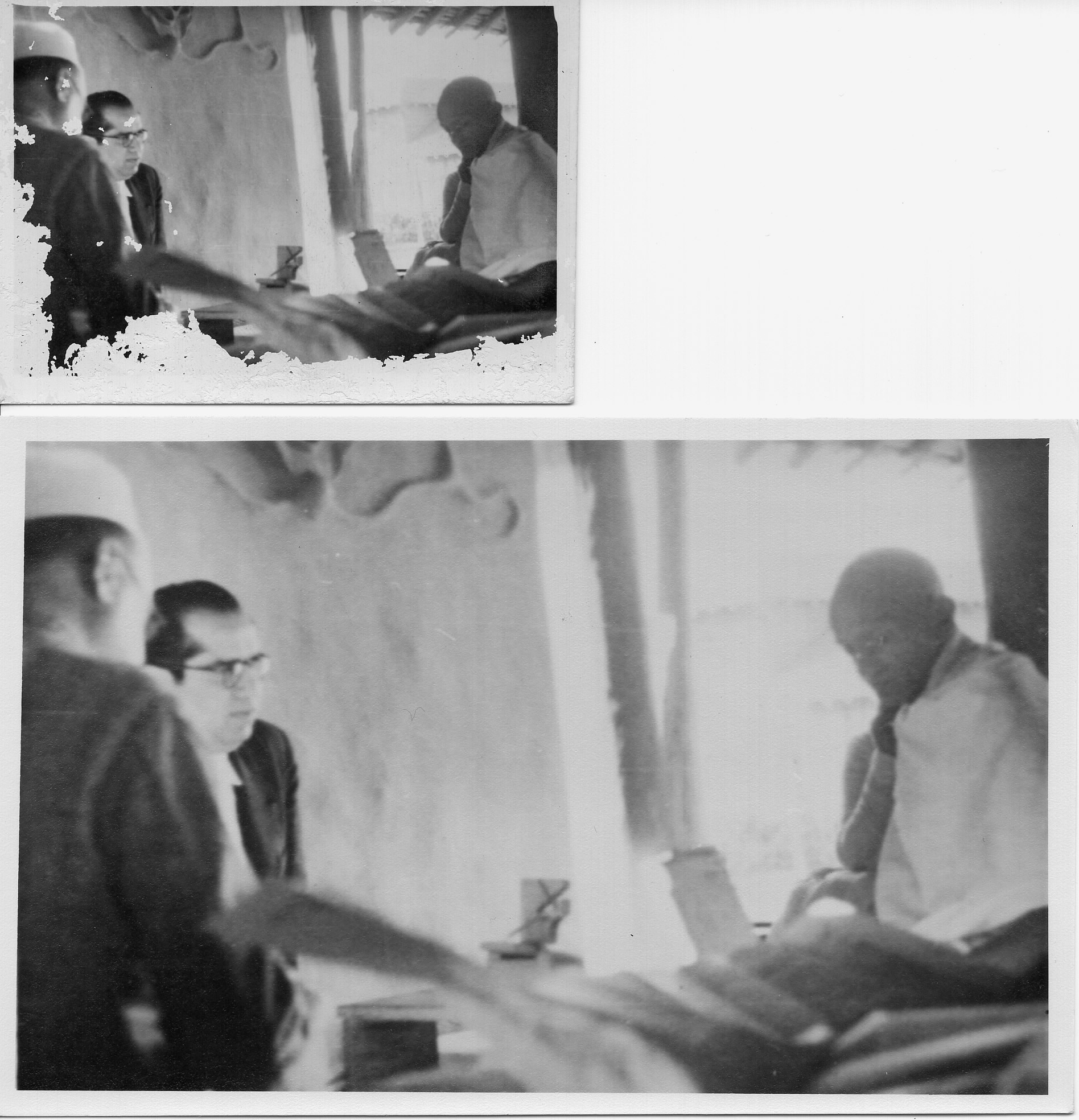

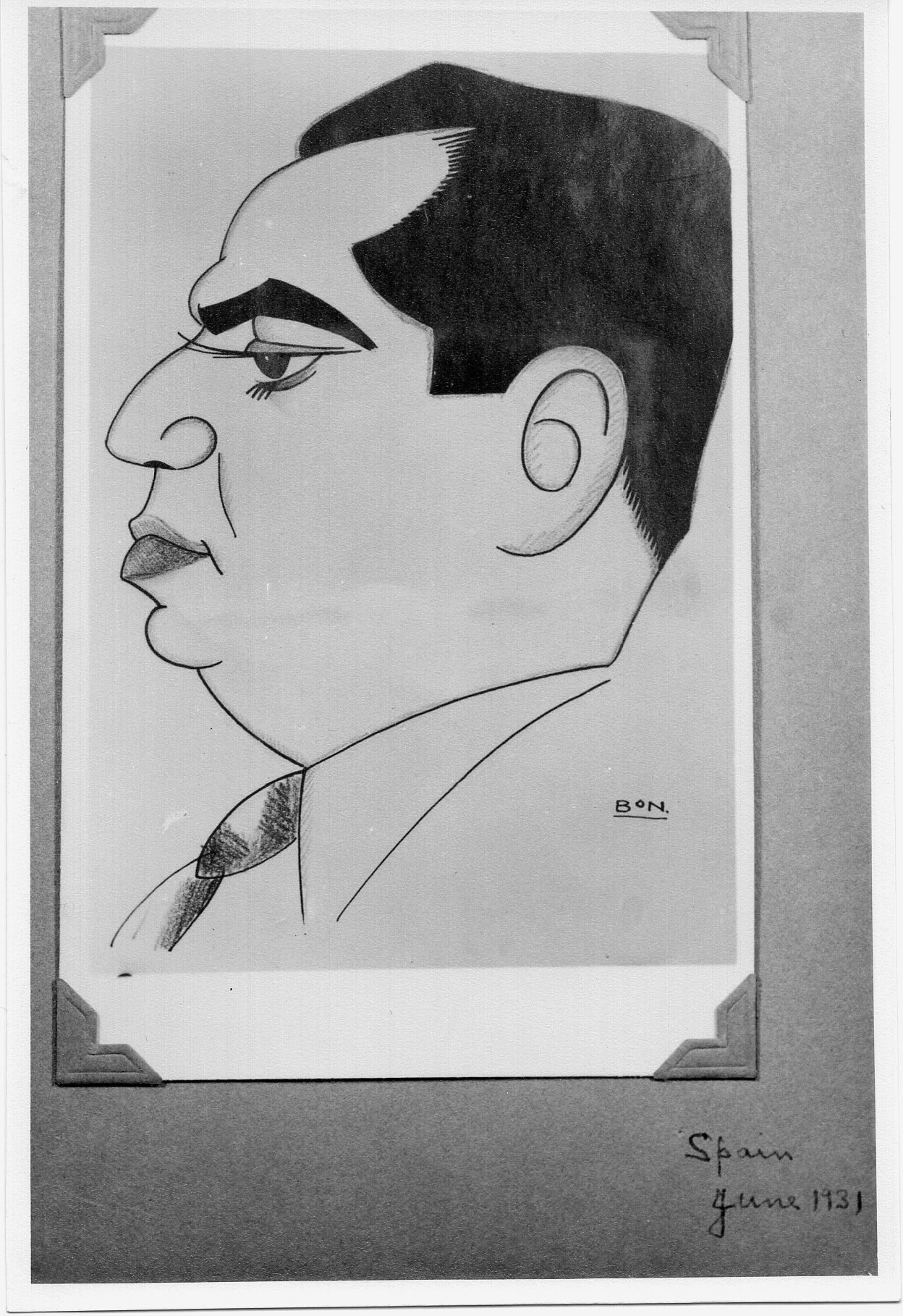

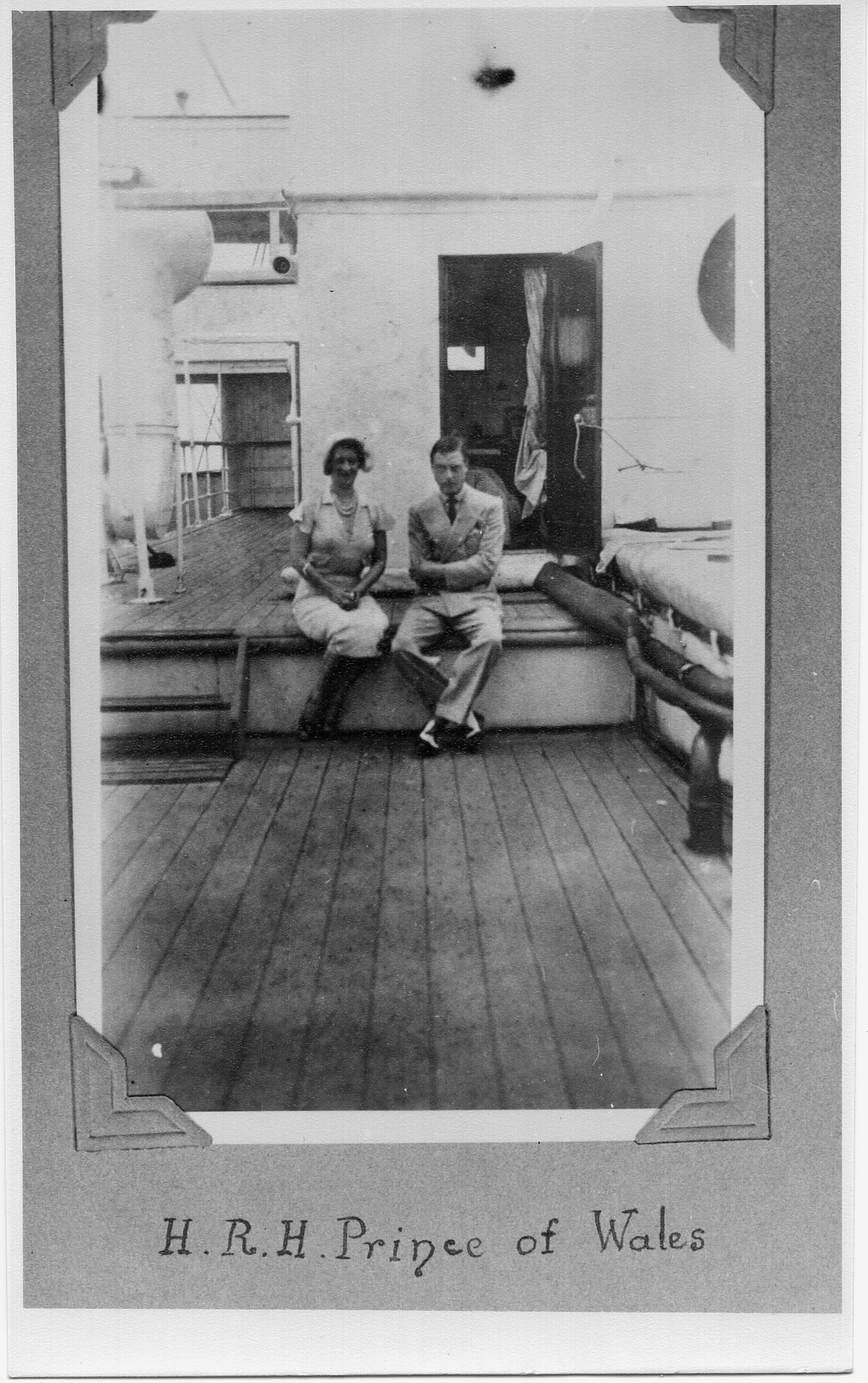

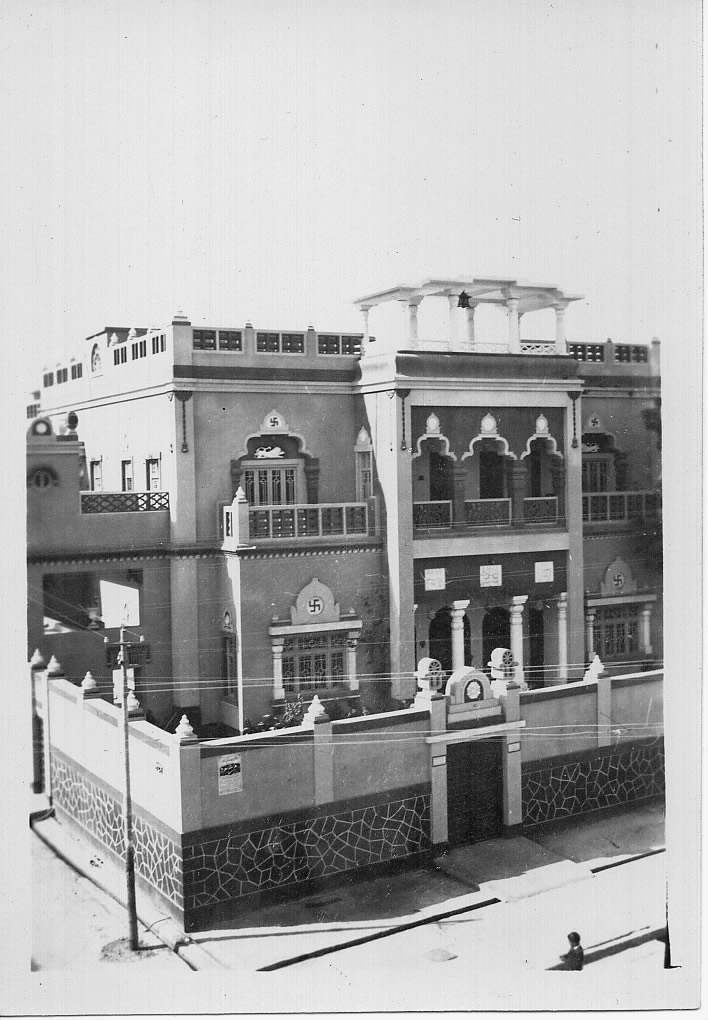

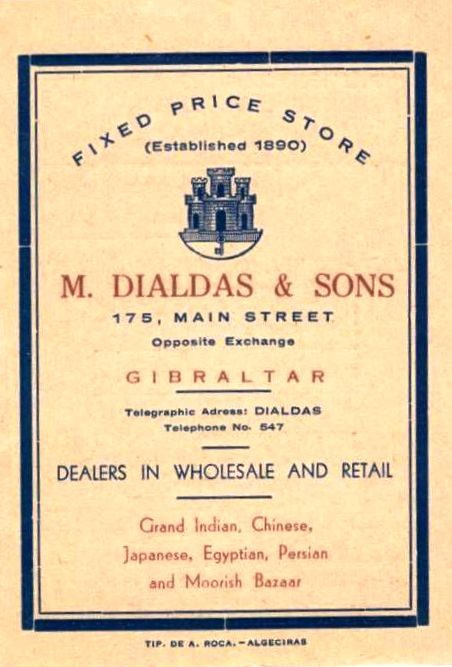

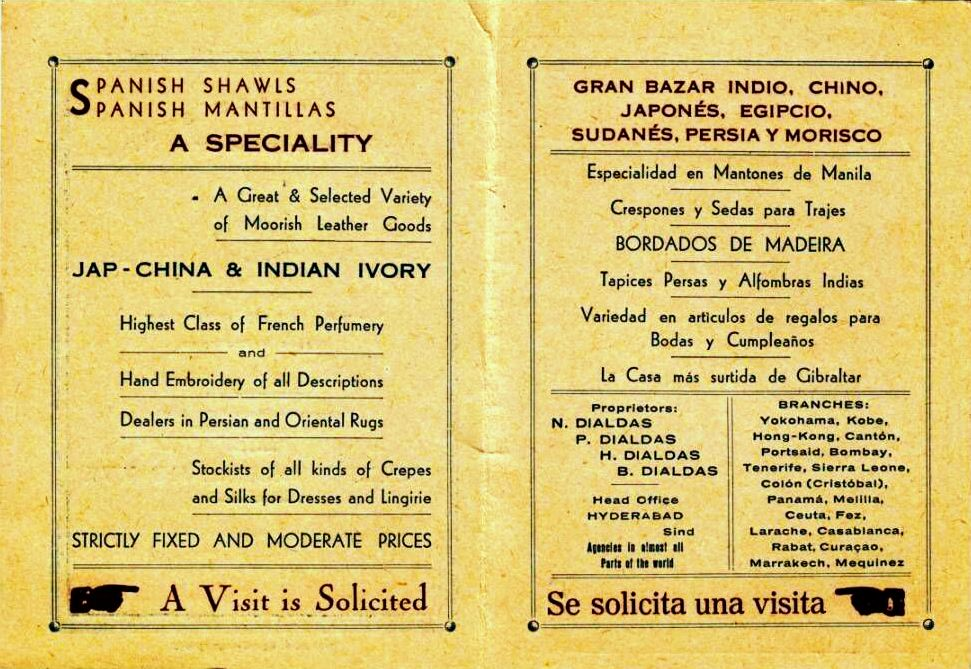

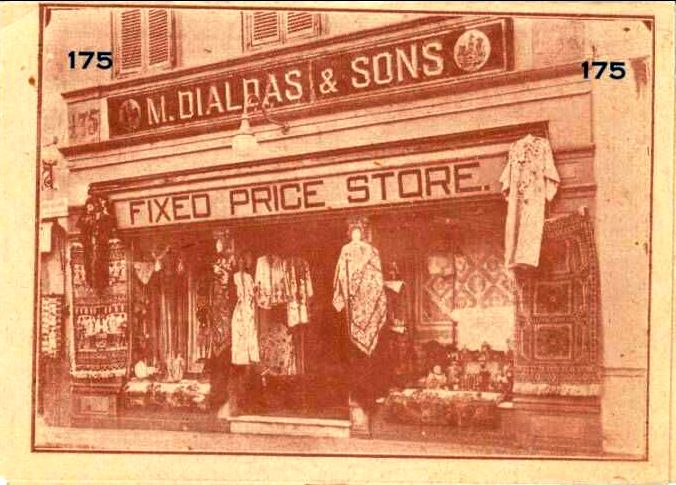

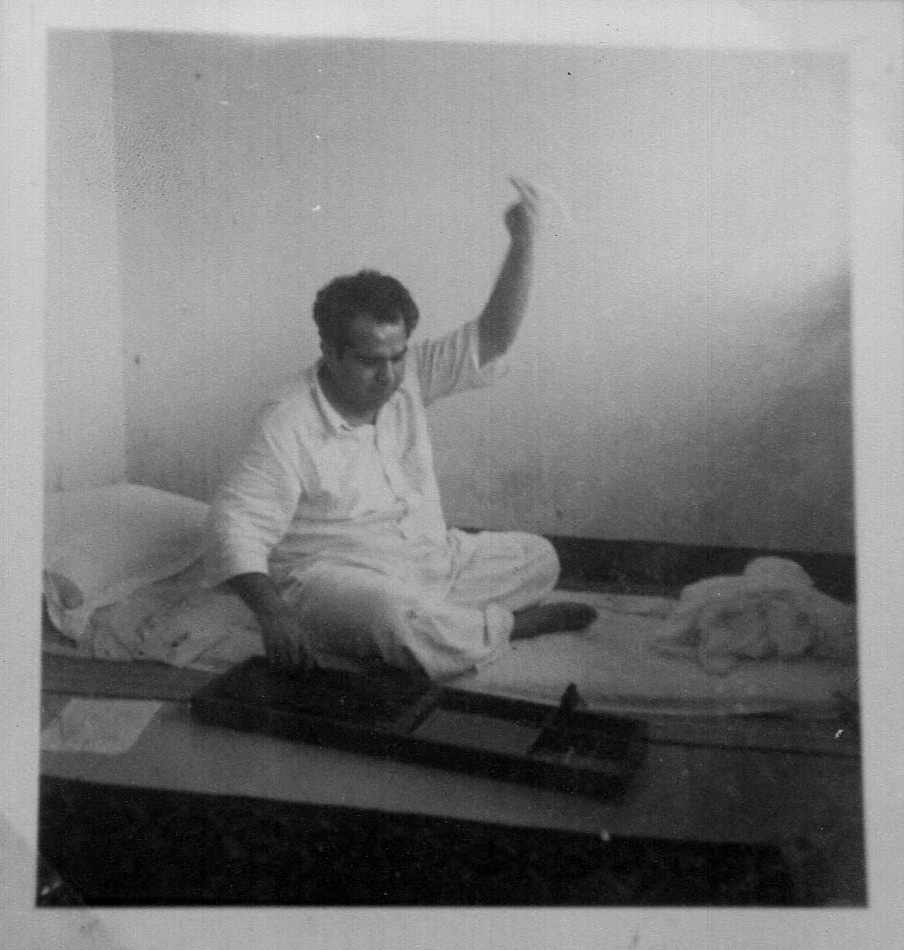

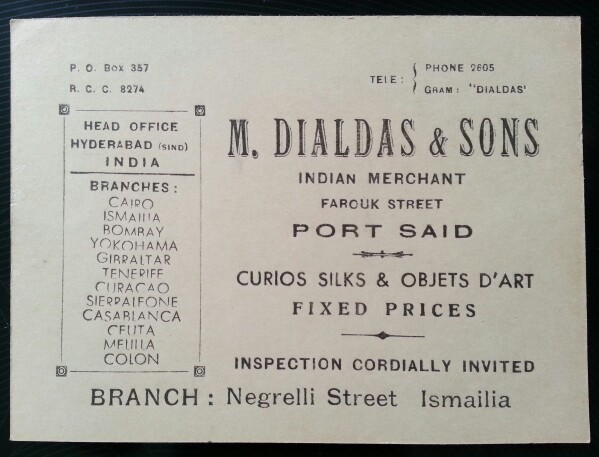
