= Adipur =

Town in Kutch District, Gujarat, India

Adipur Gandhidham
- City
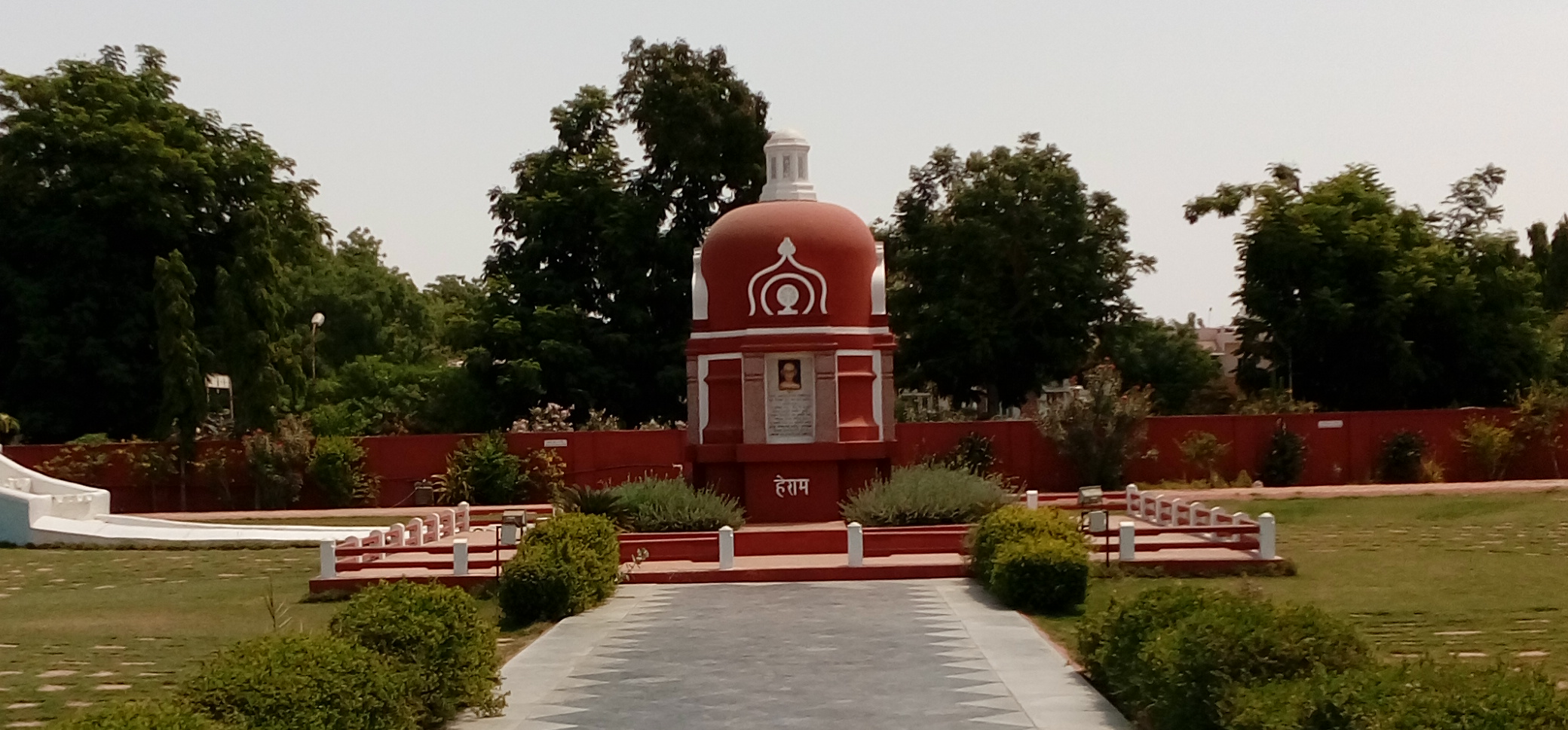
- Gandhi Samadhi

- Location in Gujarat, India Adipur (India)
- Coordinates: 23.073454°N 70.090585°E
- Country: India
- State: Gujarat
- District: Kutch
- Municipal Corporation: Gandhidham Municipal Corporation

Government
  - Type: Municipal Corporation
- Elevation: 27 m (89 ft)

Population (2001)
  - Total: 86,388

Languages
  - Official: Gujarati, Hindi
  - Regional: Sindhi, Kutchi
- Time zone: UTC+5:30 (IST)
- PIN: 370205
- Telephone code: 02836
- Vehicle registration: GJ- 39
- Sex ratio: 0.894 ♂/♀
- Distance from Bhuj: 60 kilometres (37 mi)
- Distance from Ahmedabad: 350 kilometres (220 mi)
- Website: gujaratindia.com

Adipur is a town in Gandhidham Municipal Corporation of Kutch District in the state of Gujarat, India. The town is situated approximately 5 miles (8.0 km) from Gandhidham.

== History ==
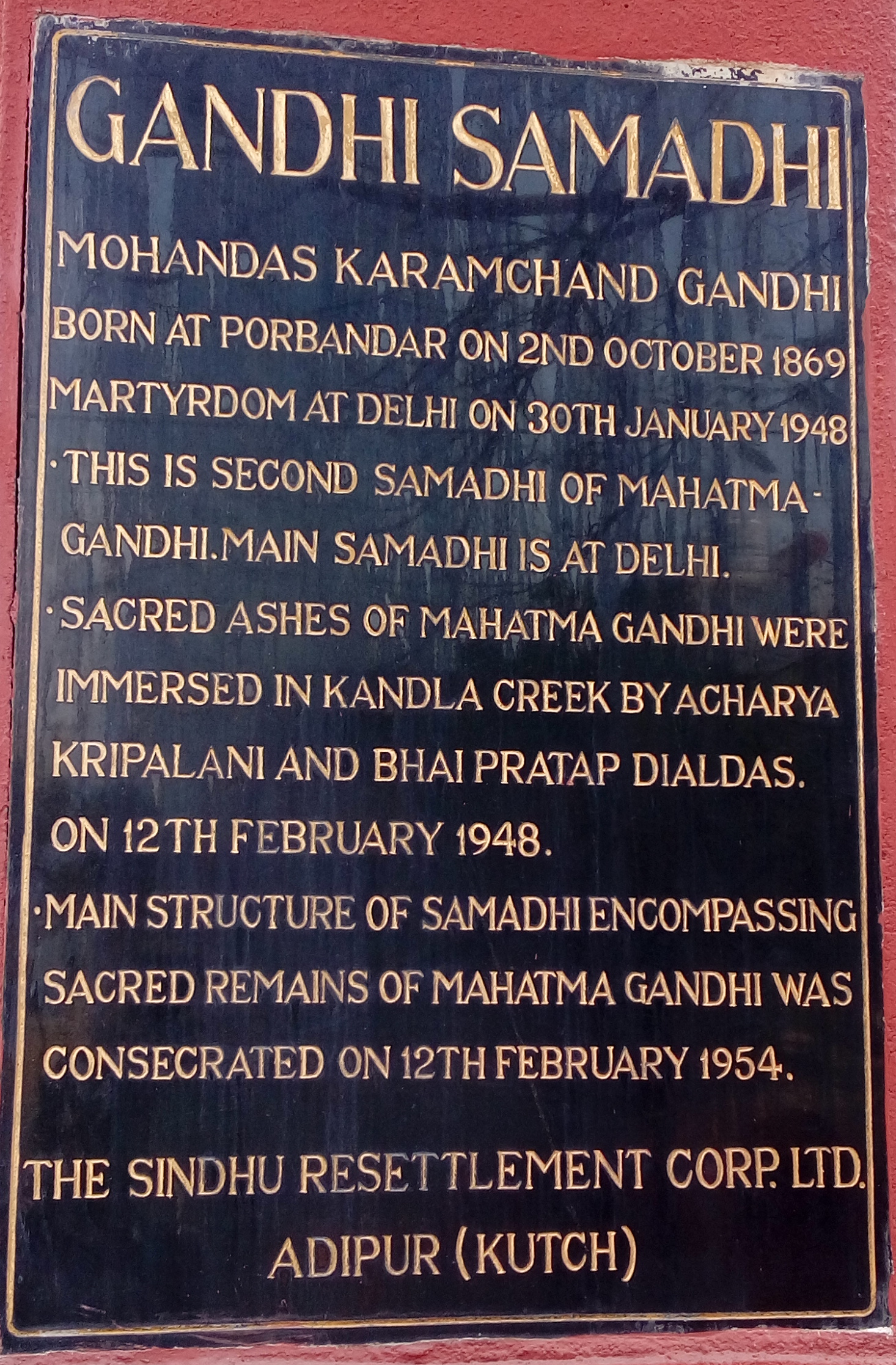
Memorial plaque of Gandhi Samadhi

Adipur was initially founded as a refugee camp after the partition of India, in 1947, by the government of India. Its administration was passed onto a self-governing body called the Sindhu Resettlement Corporation Ltd (SRC). The person credited with the formation of this settlement was Bhai Pratap Dialdas, who requested land from Mahatma Gandhi for the (mostly Sindhi) immigrants from Sindh, now West Pakistan. The Maharaja of Kutch, Vijayaraji donated 15,000 acres (61 km^{2}) of land. in Adipur/Gandhidham, which was built on this land. Later the Indian Institute of Sindhology was established at Adipur is a center for advanced studies and research in the fields related to the Sindhi language, literature, art and culture.

Adipur is famous for Gandhi Samadhi and a huge number of Charlie Chaplin fans and impersonators.

Adipur was affected by the earthquake of 26 January 2001.

== Climate ==
This climate is considered to be BWh according to the Koppen-Geiger classification of climates. The average annual temperature is 26.8c. The average rainfall is 375mm.

== Education ==
Adipur has nine higher education institutions run by the Gandhidham Collegiate Board.

Admissions were traditionally competitive with the rest of the district, but overall, due to the limited infrastructure surrounding the campuses, the populace is mostly local students from Anjar, Gandhidham, Adipur, and other surrounding towns.

Schools in the city include Excelsior Model School, Shri R.P Patel High School, St. Xavier's School, Sadhu Hiranand Navalrai Academy, Maitri Maha Vidyalaya, Modern School, Mount Carmel School and Twinkle Star School.

== See also ==
- Gandhidham
- Anjar
- Kandla
- Galpadar
