= Doshi =

Indian surname

Doshi is a surname in India. The roots can be traced back a few hundred years. There were different stories — one is from the History of Oswals basically from Rajasthan original Sonigra Kshatriya Rajput. Also Doshi surname people follow Jainism in Gujarat region.

== History ==
According to Oswal Jain Gyati Mahodya (ancient book on the history of Oswals) the Doshi are descended from Thakur Heer Singh Sonigara, ruler of Bhatia (old name of Jaisalmer) in Rajasthan in 160 AD.

A Gujarati story which Narsinh Mehta mentions the Hindu deity Krishna appearing as a doshi vanio. A doshi was somebody who carried a dosh, or a sack of grocery/clothes, to sell as he wandered. This is similar to another translation of doshi as a rough cloth seller. Most Gujaratis believe this is the story behind the last name "Doshi".

== Notable Doshi people ==
- Walchand Hirachand Doshi (1882-1953), Indian industrialist
- Chaturbhuj Doshi (1894-1969), Indian film director
- B. V. Doshi (1927-2023), Indian architect
- Navin Doshi (b. 1936), Indian philanthropist
- Dilip Doshi (1947-2025), Indian cricketer
- Saryu Doshi, Indian art scholar
- Sushil Doshi, Indian journalist
- Tishani Doshi (b. 1975), Indian poet
- Nayan Doshi (b. 1978), English cricketer
- Avni Doshi (b. 1982), American novelist
- Darshan Doshi (b. 1986), Indian drummer
- Shiny Doshi (b. 1989), Indian television actress
- Natasha Doshi (b. 1993), Indian actress
- Rheeya Doshi (b. 1996), Singaporean tennis player
