= Navin Doshi =

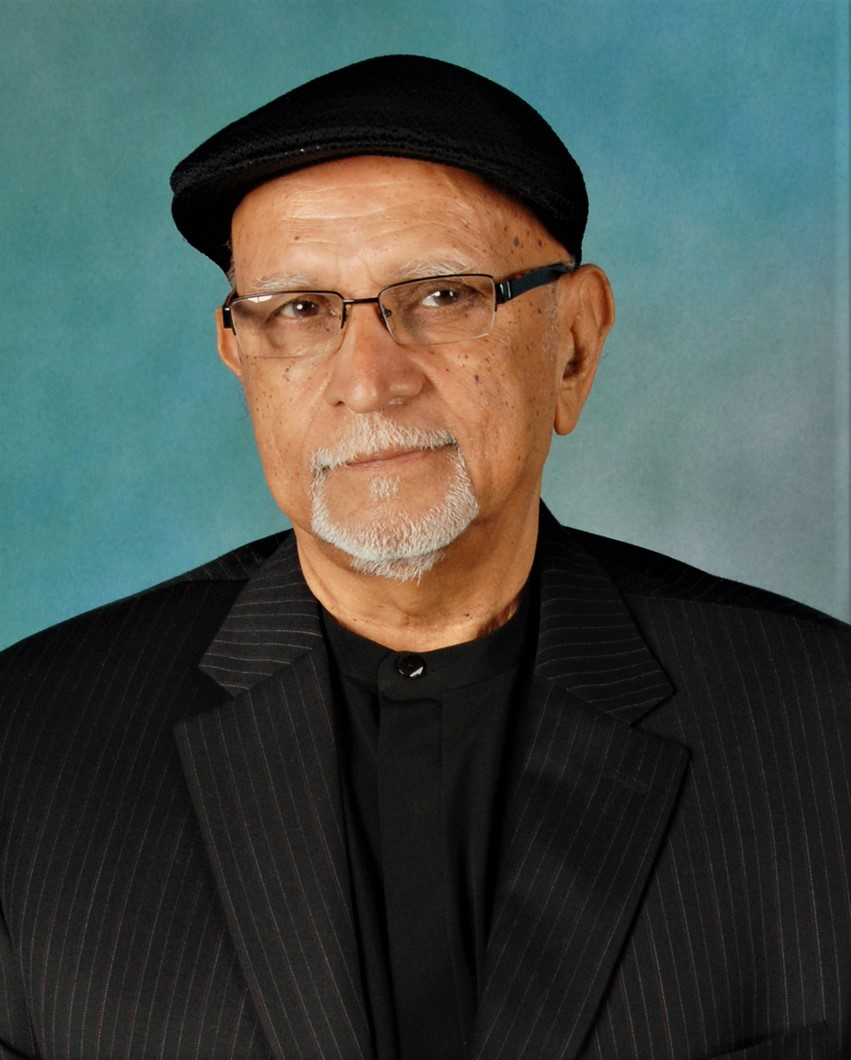
- Born: 1936 (age 89–90)
- Education: College of Engineering, Pune; Gujarat University; University of Michigan; UCLA
- Occupations: Author, scholar, philanthropist
- Years active: 1958–present
- Spouse: Pratima Doshi

Navichandra Harilal "Navin" Doshi (born 1936) is an author, scholar, philanthropist, and co-founder of Nalanda International, a non-profit organization.

== Early life and education ==
Doshi was born in Bhavnagar, Gujarat, India into a Gujarati family. He eventually moved to Bombay, Maharashtra. Doshi completed his undergraduate studies at the College of Engineering, Pune, and received his Bachelors of Engineering degree from the L.D. Engineering College of Gujarat University, before moving to the U.S. in 1958. In the U.S., Doshi attended University of Michigan, Ann Arbor, to complete his Master's in electrical engineering and then UCLA for his PhD program.

== Career ==
After his studies, Doshi started working as an aerospace engineer at TRW Inc. He started a bedspread business and made investments in real-estate and other financial instruments.

In 1999, Doshi with his wife, Pratima Doshi endowed the Doshi Chair of Indian History at UCLA and founded the Sardar Patel Award. In 2006, Doshi endowed a professorship for Indic traditions at Loyola Marymount University (LMU) which also gives a Bridgebuilder Award annually, jointly with Bellarmine College of Liberal Arts and the Department of Theological Studies. He is also a member of the LMU Advisory Board since 2009, the board of directors of South Asian Studies Association and on the board of directors of the Indic Foundation. In 2020, Doshi created an endowment to support academic works of SASA and this endowment is attached to the Doshi Professor of Indic and Comparative Theology at LMU.

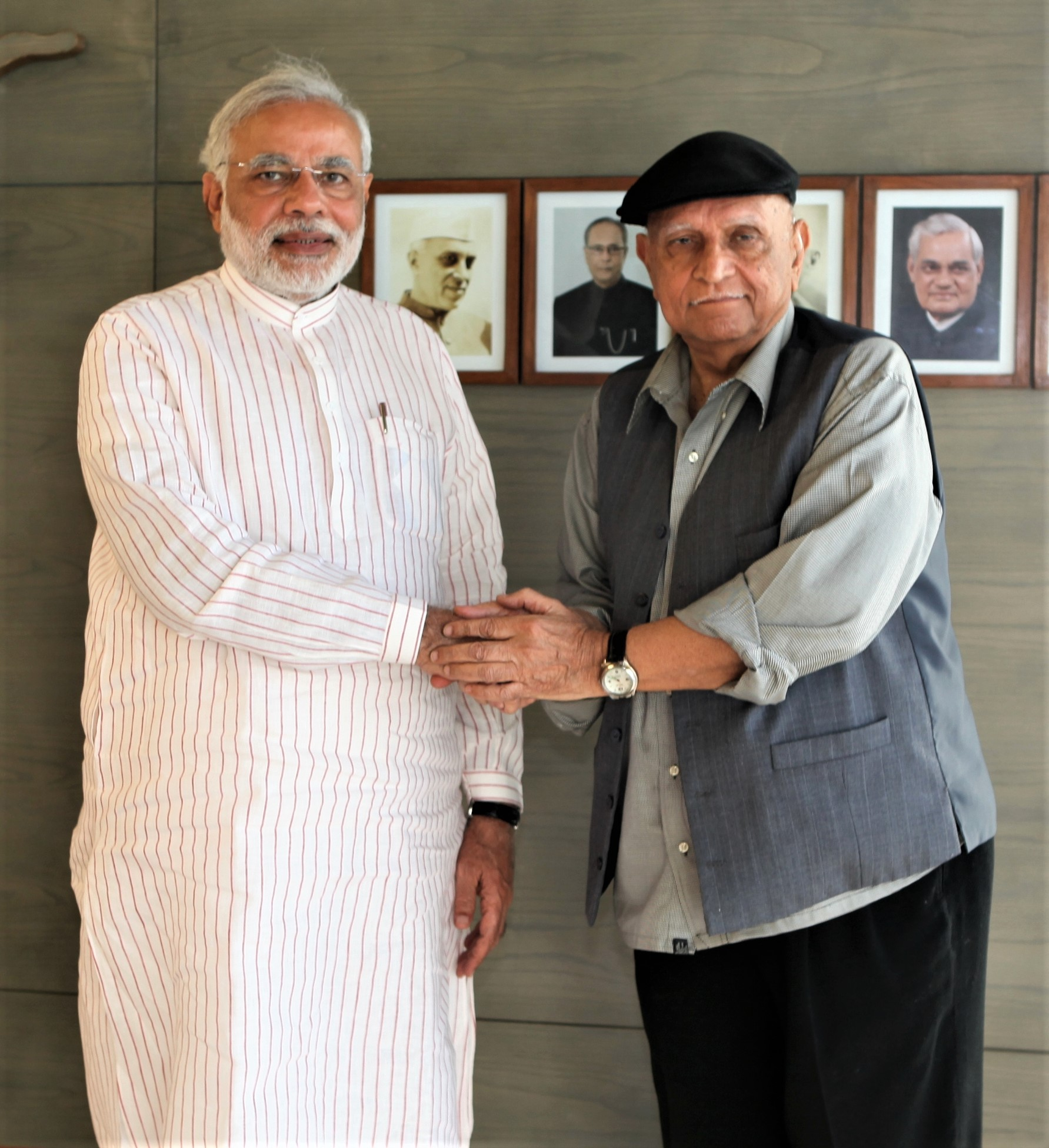
Doshi with the Prime Minister of India, Narendra Modi.

In 2012, Doshi established the Haridas Chaudhuri Chair in Indian Philosophies and Cultures and a Doshi professorship in Asian Art at California Institute of Integral Studies (CIIS). In 2019, he established a chair on water and sanitation research, named after his parents, Kanchan and Harilal Doshi, at the Indian Institute of Technology Gandhinagar.

In 2019, Doshi received the Doctorate of Peace award from the Maharishi University of Management in Iowa.

== Awards & Honors ==
- 2023 Honored by the President and Board of Trustees of Maharishi International University for establishing The Doshi Center for Maharishi Ayurveda and Integrative Health.
- 2017 Exemplar Community Service Award presented by the board of directors of South Asian Studies Association (SASA), Claremont McKenna College, Claremont, California.
- 2019 Doctorate of Peace Award from the Maharishi University of Management, Iowa City, Iowa.
- 2023 Honored by the President and Board of Trustees of the Maharishi International University for establishing the Doshi Center of Maharishi Ayurveda and Integrative Health.
- 2023 Lifetime Achievement Award presented by the Indo-American Senior Heritage Foundation, Artesia, California.

== Books ==
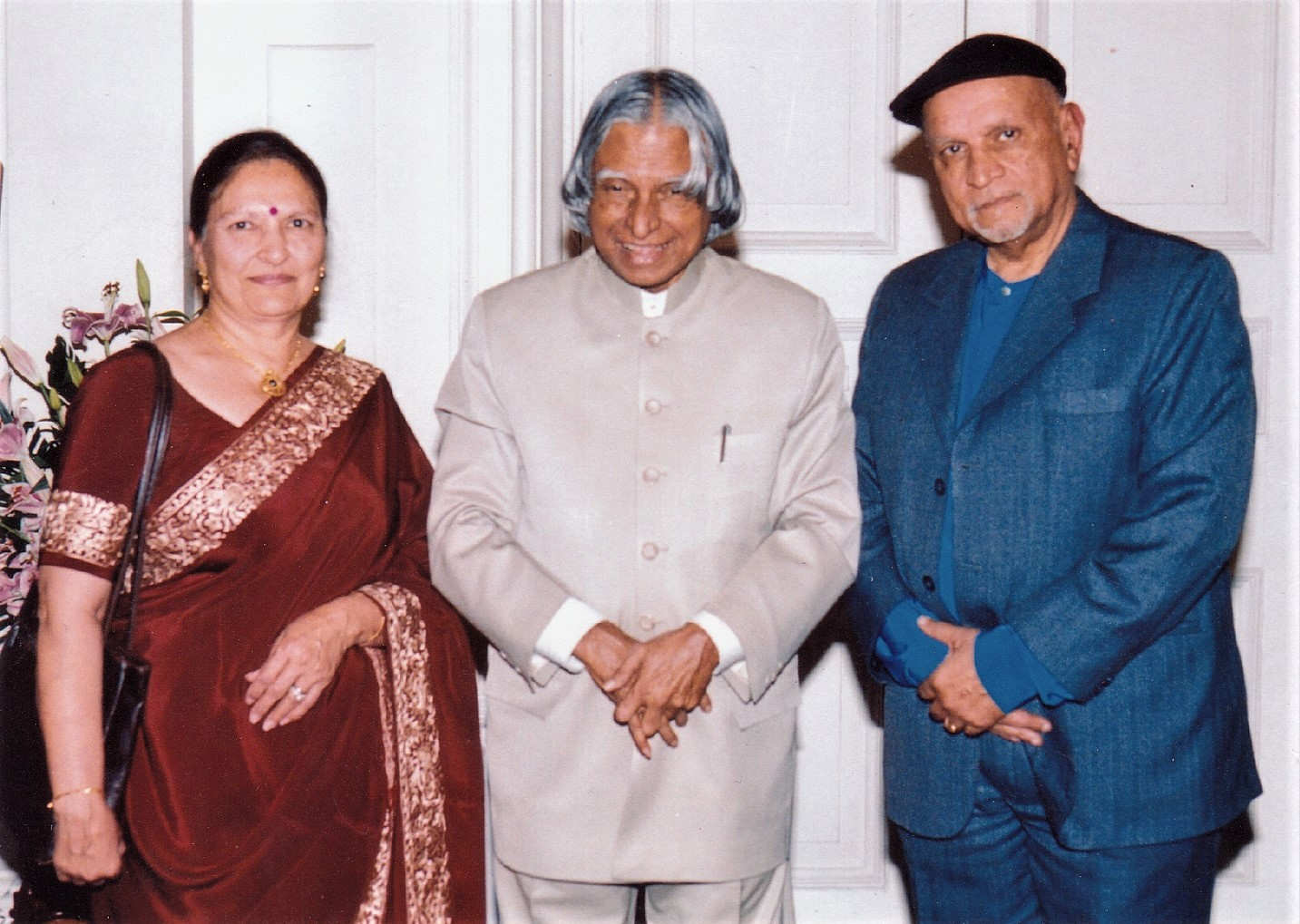
Doshi and his wife with former President of India, A. P. J. Abdul Kalam.

- Saving Us from Ourselves, 2005 – ISBN 0977191702
- Transcendence: Saving Us From Ourselves, 2009 – ISBN 0981511635
- Economics and Nature: Essays in Balance, Complementarity and Harmony, 2012 – ISBN 9788124606223
- Light With No Shadow: My Life Bridging Two Cultures, 2016 – ISBN 1504354699
- Gold Incarnate Sun Gold, 2019 – ISBN 0983389950

== Bibliography ==
- South Asian Studies: Bridging Cultures, A Felicitation Volume to Celebrate the Life and Work of Navin Doshi, edited by Deepak Shimkhada, 2020 – ISBN 9798647543998
