= Gandhidham =

- City
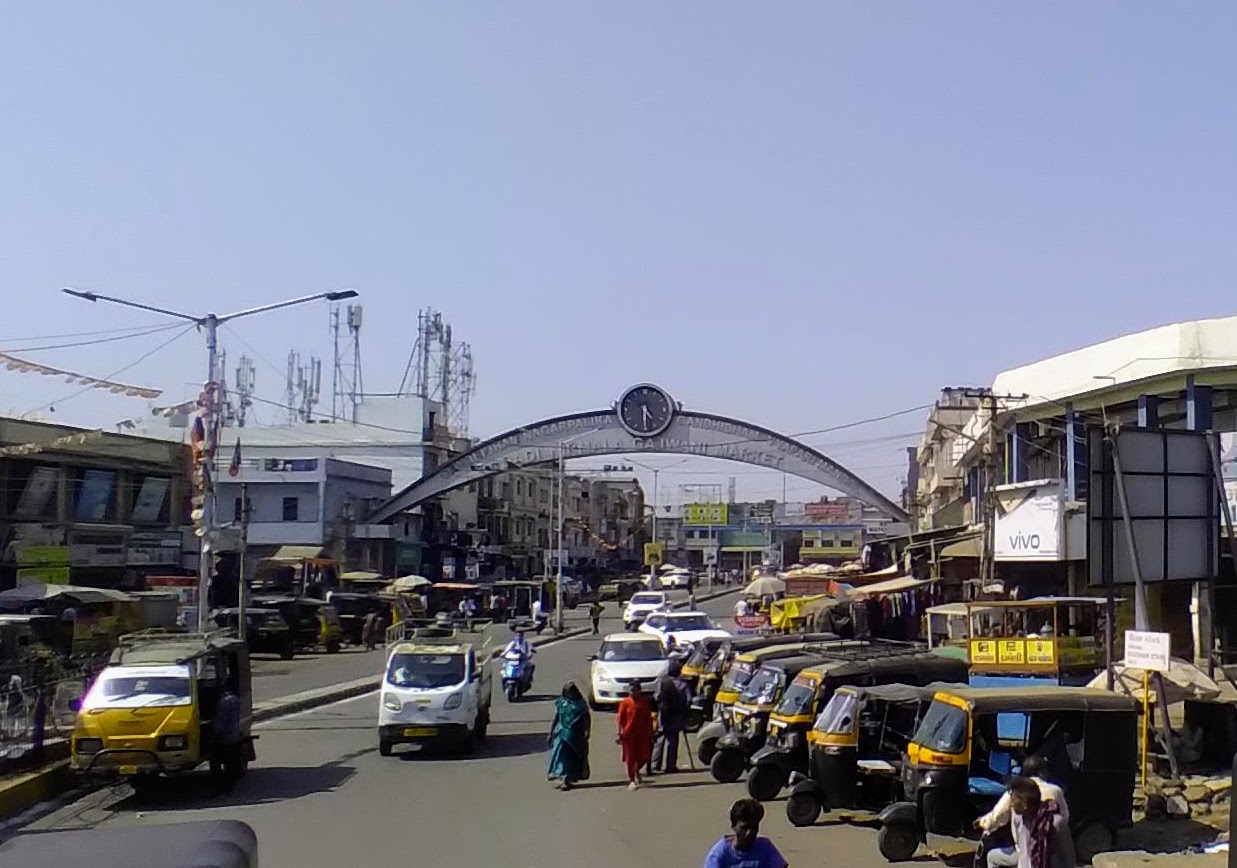
- Dadi Nirmala Gajwani Market Gate
- Nickname: Sardar Ganj
- Location in Gujarat, India
- Coordinates: 23.08°N 70.13°E
- Country: India
- State: Gujarat
- District: Kutch
- Founder: Bhai Pratap

Government
  - Type: Municipal Corporation
  - Body: Gandhidham Municipal Corporation

Area
  - Total: 63.49 km^{2} (24.51 sq mi)
- Elevation: 27 m (89 ft)

Population (2011)
  - Total: 248,705
  - Rank: 181
  - Density: 3,917/km^{2} (10,150/sq mi)

Languages
  - Official: Gujarati, Hindi
  - Regional: Sindhi, Kutchi
- Time zone: UTC+5:30
- PIN: 370201, 370203, 370205, 370230, 370240
- Telephone code: 02836
- Vehicle registration: GJ-39
- Sex ratio: 0.879 ♂/♀
- Distance from Bhuj: 60 kilometres (37 mi)
- Distance from Gandhinagar: 365 kilometres (227 mi)
- Website: https://www.gandhidhamnagarpalika.org/

Gandhidham is located in the eastern part of Kutch district, in the state of Gujarat. It is the largest and most populous city in (Kachchh) Kutch District, Gujarat, India. It was created in the early 1950s for the resettlement of Sindhi Hindu refugees from Sindh, Pakistan, in the aftermath of the partition of India. The city was named after M K Gandhi. An economic capital of Kutch, Gandhidham is a growing area for families and retirees. According to the 2011 Census, Gandhidham is Gujarat's 8th most populous city. It is a popular destination for conventions, business, and meetings.

== History ==
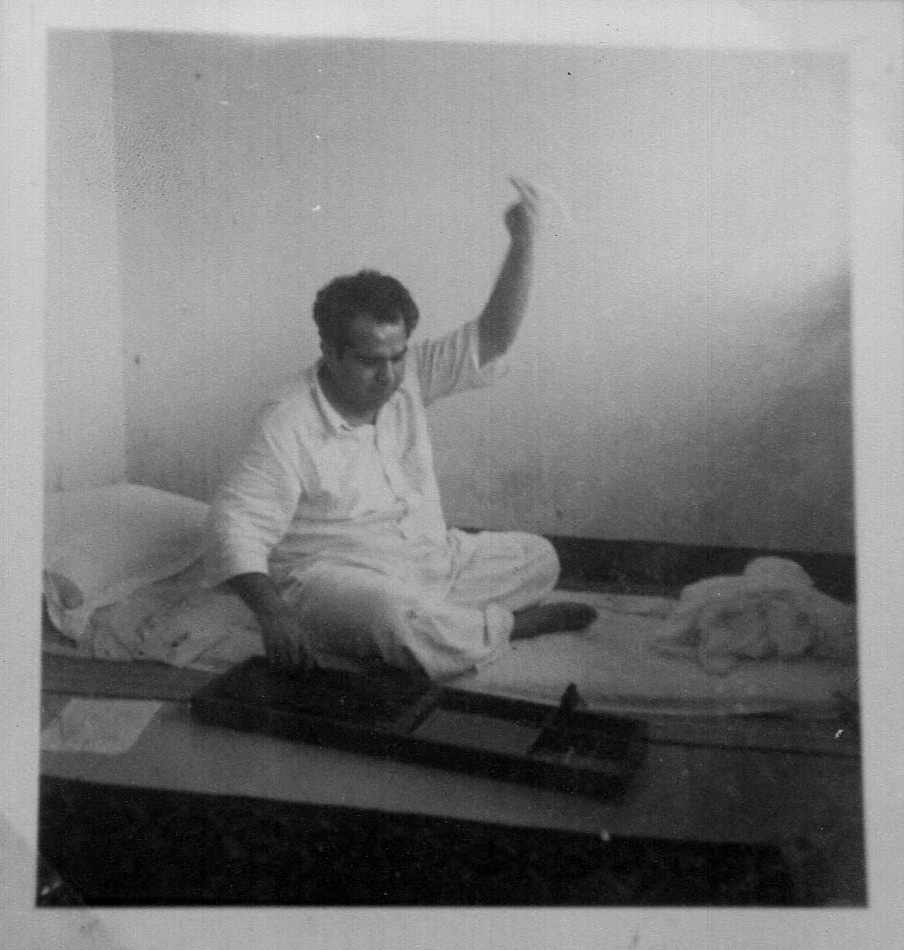
Bhai Pratap spinning cotton yarn

Soon after the Partition of India, in 1947, a large group of Sindhi Hindus refugees from Sindh of Pakistan migrated to India. The maharaja of Kutch Vijayaraji donated 15,000 acres (61 km^{2}) of land to Bhai Pratap, who founded the Sindhu Resettlement Corporation Ltd. (SRC) to rehabilitate Sindhi Hindus that migrated from Sindh in Pakistan.

The Sindhu Resettlement Corporation Ltd was formed with Acharya Kriplani as chairman and Bhai Pratap Dialdas as managing director. The corporation's primary goal was to help displaced people find new dwellings by building a new township. The original plan was prepared by a team of planners headed by Otto H. Königsberger, director of the division of housing in the Government of India. Later, the plan was revised by Adams, Howard and Greeley Company in 1952. The foundation stone of the town was laid with the blessings of Mahatma Gandhi in 1947. Hence, the town was named Gandhidham. To clean the desert where it was built, Pratap gave an incentive of 25 paise to kill scorpions and 50 paise to kill snakes. The original plan envisaged 400,000 as of the ultimate population of the town, expecting half of it to be reached in the mid-1970s. A revised plan envisaged three stages of town development with the mid-stage lasting longer with a population of around 150,000.

== Geography and climate ==
Gandhidham is located at latitude 23.08° N longitude 70.13° E. The main city is constructed in accordance with the principles of Vastu-Shastra (Hindu belief of construction), i.e., the main city has its face directed to the East.

Due to the very high potential evapotranspiration, Gandhidham has a hot semi-arid climate (Köppen BSh) receiving around 385 millimetres or 15 inches of rainfall per year.

Almost all rainfall occurs during the monsoon season from June to September — outside this period, Gandhidham averages just 15 millimetres or 0.59 inches of rain in eight months. Gandhidham's amount of rainfall, although not especially low on paper, is amongst the most erratic anywhere in the world with a coefficient of variation of around sixty percent – among the few comparably variable climates in the world being the Line Islands of Kiribati, the Pilbara coast of Western Australia, the sertão of Northeastern Brazil, and the Cape Verde islands.

During the "cool" season from October to March, temperatures range from very warm to hot during the afternoon and are cool to pleasant in the mornings. Whilst during the hot season, afternoon temperatures become sweltering and extremely unpleasant, especially when, with the approach of the monsoon, humidity increases.

Climate data for Gandhidham
Month	Jan	Feb	Mar	Apr	May	Jun	Jul	Aug	Sep	Oct	Nov	Dec	Year
Mean daily maximum °C (°F)	26.8 (80.2)	30.0 (86.0)	34.8 (94.6)	38.5 (101.3)	39.8 (103.6)	38.0 (100.4)	33.9 (93.0)	32.6 (90.7)	33.8 (92.8)	36.1 (97.0)	33.1 (91.6)	28.6 (83.5)	33.8 (92.9)
Daily mean °C (°F)	18.2 (64.8)	21.2 (70.2)	26.1 (79.0)	30.2 (86.4)	32.7 (90.9)	32.7 (90.9)	30.1 (86.2)	29.0 (84.2)	29.0 (84.2)	28.7 (83.7)	24.2 (75.6)	19.8 (67.6)	26.8 (80.3)
Mean daily minimum °C (°F)	9.7 (49.5)	12.4 (54.3)	17.5 (63.5)	21.9 (71.4)	25.6 (78.1)	27.5 (81.5)	26.4 (79.5)	25.5 (77.9)	24.2 (75.6)	21.3 (70.3)	15.3 (59.5)	11.0 (51.8)	19.9 (67.7)
Average precipitation mm (inches)	2 (0.1)	1 (0.0)	0 (0)	0 (0)	0 (0)	51 (2.0)	184 (7.2)	96 (3.8)	49 (1.9)	7 (0.3)	14 (0.6)	1 (0.0)	405 (15.9)
Source: Climate-Data.org (altitude: 19m)

== Governance ==
The city is represented by a constituency in the Gujarat Legislative Assembly. It forms part of the Kachchh Lok Sabha constituency.

== 2001 Earthquake Calamity ==
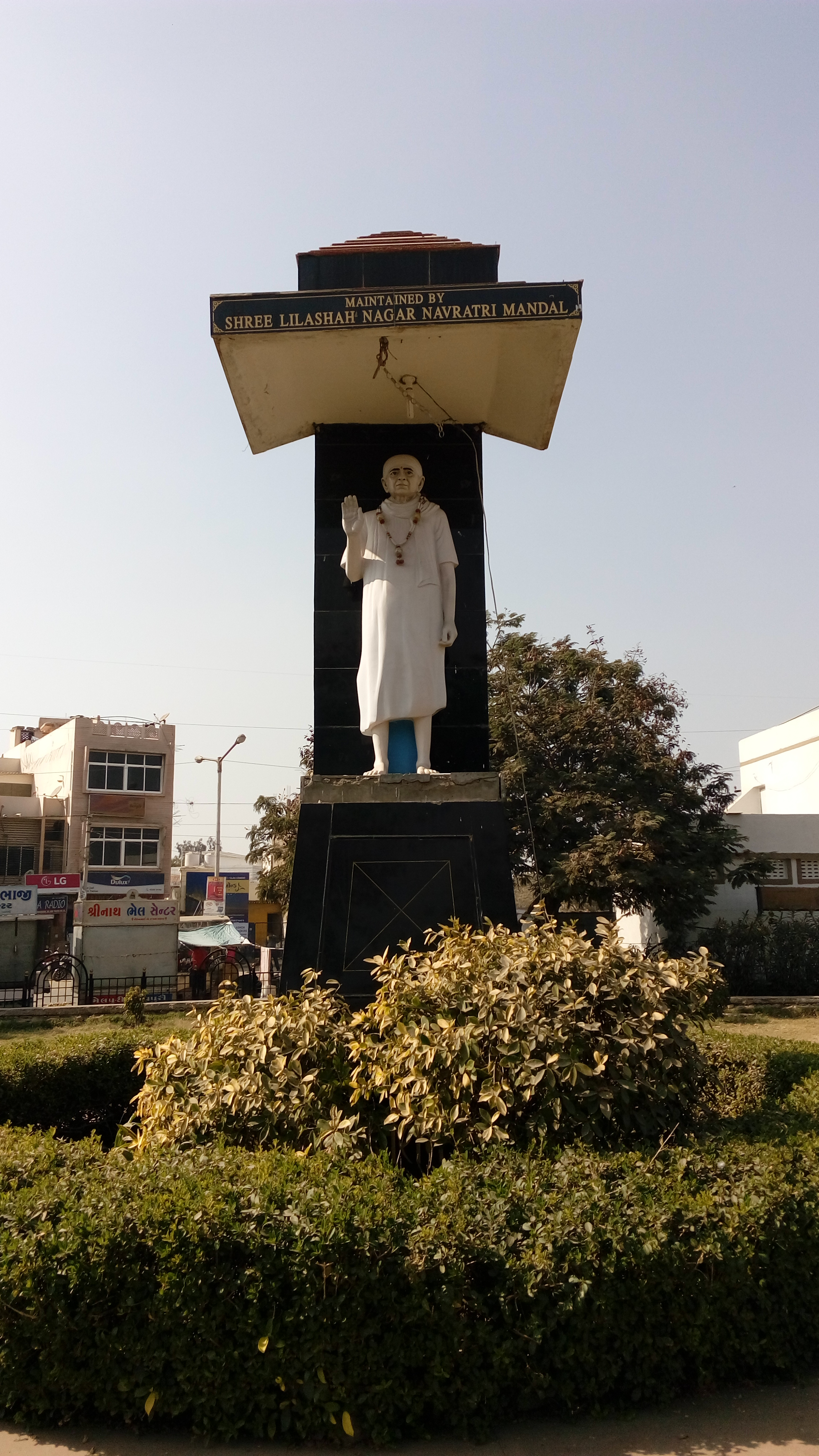
Lilashah statue at Gandhidham

The Gujarat earthquake of 2001 majorly affected the city of Gandhidham along with many nearby towns like Bhuj, Anjar, Bhachau and more. The shock, which measured 7.7 on the moment magnitude scale and had a maximum Mercalli intensity of XI (Extreme), killed 13,805–20,023, left roughly 166,800 injured, and many were left homeless including Gandhidham. The death toll in the Kutch region was 12,300. Bhuj, which was situated only 50 km away from the Gandhidham, was devastated. Considerable damage also occurred in City Gandhidham and Bhachau and Anjar with hundreds of villages flattened in Taluka of Anjar, Bhuj and Bhachau.

== Land of Adipur and Gandhidham ==
Gandhidham was the dream of Pratap Dialdas. He requested great Leaders of India for the procurement of land in the Kachchh region. They requested Maharao Vijayraj Ji of Kachchh for granting of land for re-settlement of Sindhi community people migrated from Sindh. Maharao, without any delay, granted 15000 acres of land for the purpose. Bhai Pratap said this is too big land and cannot be developed by SRC Ltd, therefore, he desired to keep with him only 2,600 acres, and the rest of the land was given to KPT and GDA for management. Today Adipur and Gandhidham townships are the townships of pride in the District of Kachchh only with the grace of Rajput Kshatriya ancestors – Provided by Ram Amarnani.

Distance between twin-townships of Adipur and Gandhidham is 5 km developed fully. The airport road dividing wards 5 and 7 divides this city, whereas Municipality is one, known as Gandhidham Municipal Corporation (from 2023). These towns are divided in two parts wherein land is recognized as Wards & Sectors. They have six wards each 1 to 6 in Adipur and 7 to 12 in Gandhidham. These wards consist of commercial, industrial and residential plots of land. The land which is owned and managed by SRC (The Sindhu Resettlement Corporation Ltd) is known as 'Wards' and The land which is owned and managed by KPT (Kandla Port Trust) is known as 'Sectors'. There are 13 such sectors in Gandhidham. Apart from this, there is vast land managed by GDA (Gandhidham Development Authority) which is known as "NU". For the construction of any permanent structure in these townships, the permission of GDA is a must.

The Authority was constituted by the State Government under their Resolution No. TPS-3858(a) dated 08.08.1958 published in the Bombay Government Gazette part IVB, Extraordinary issue dated 11.08.1958. The GDA was created on 08.08.1958.

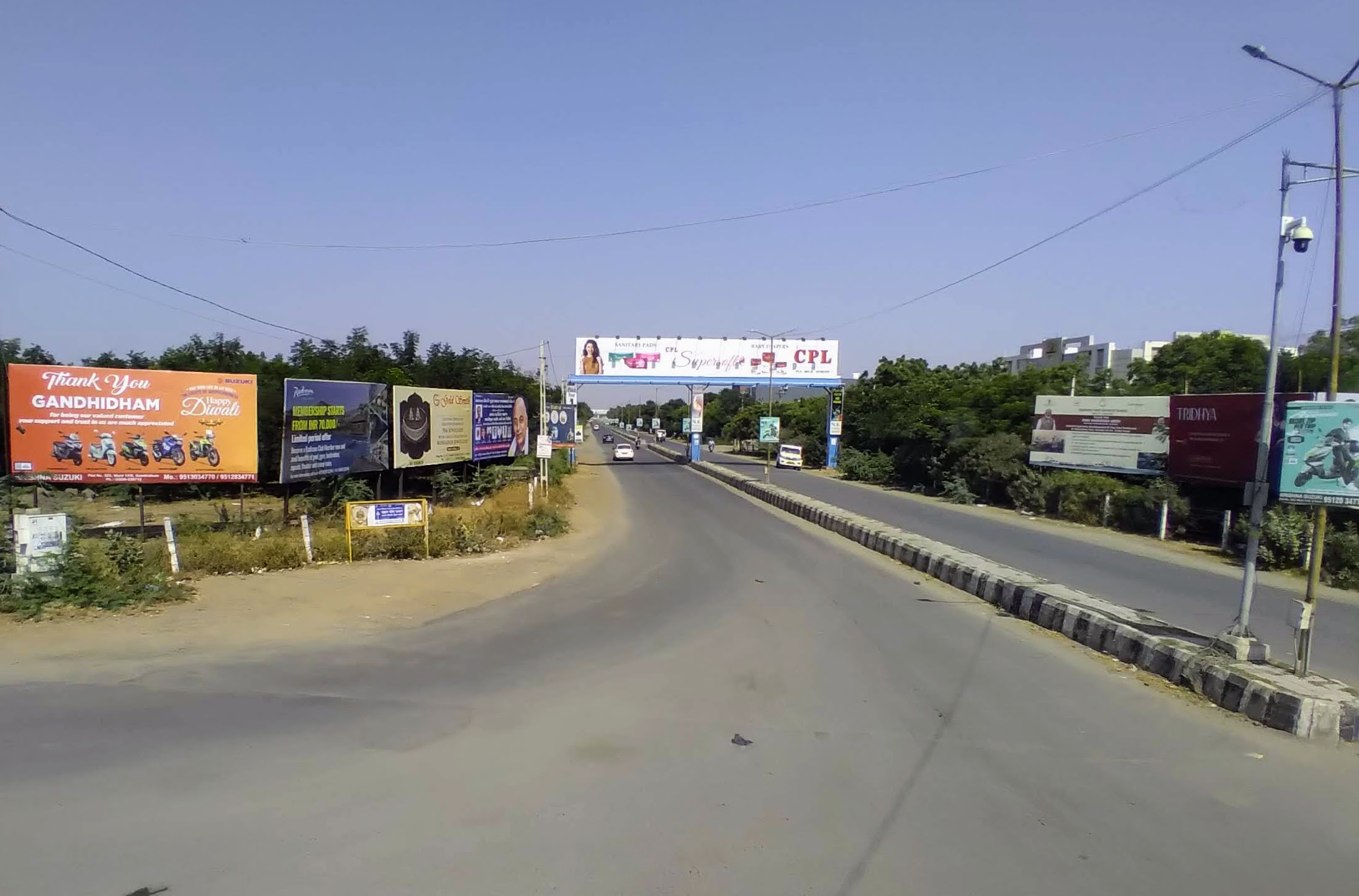
Rotary Circle

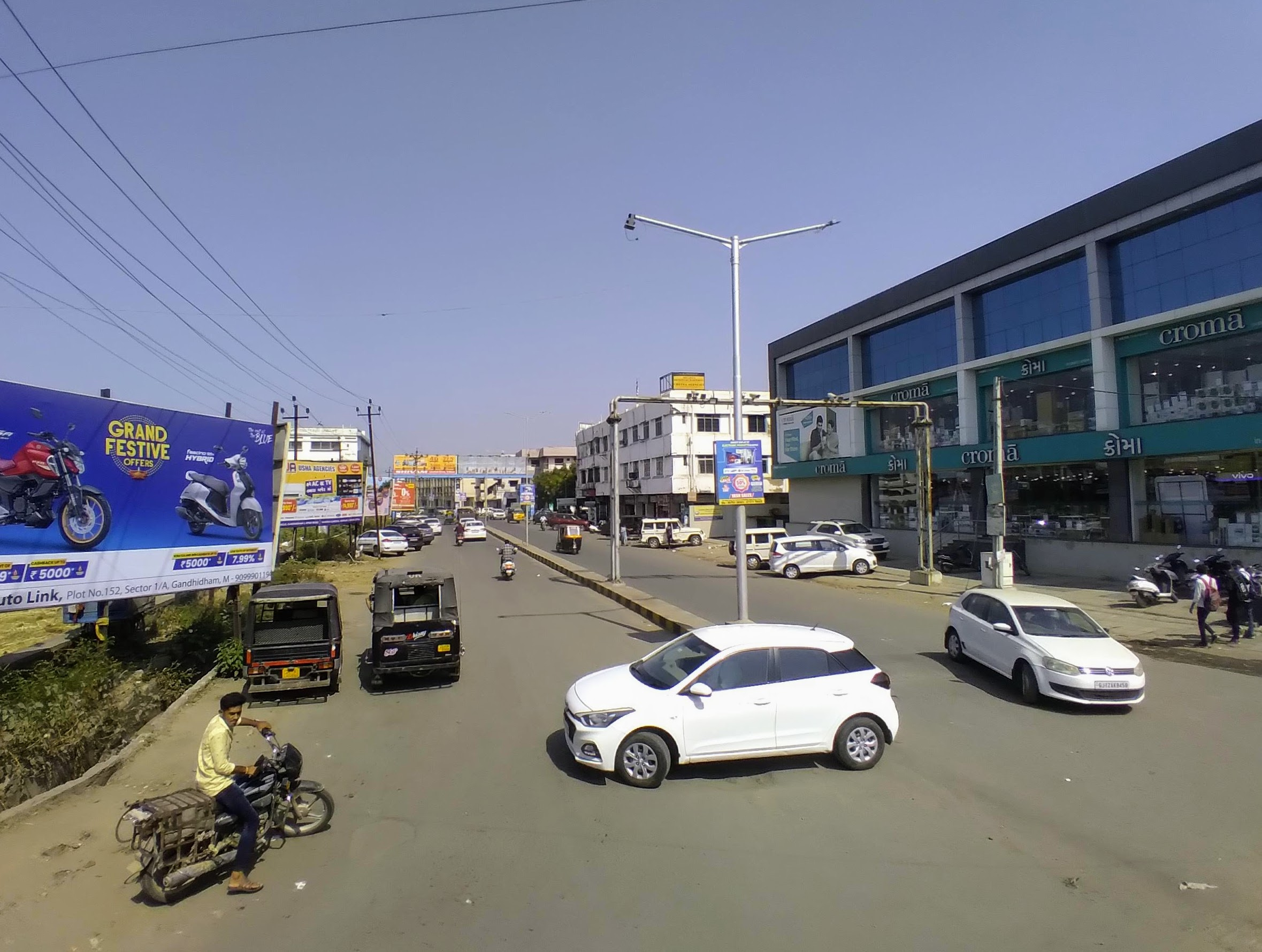
Tagore Road

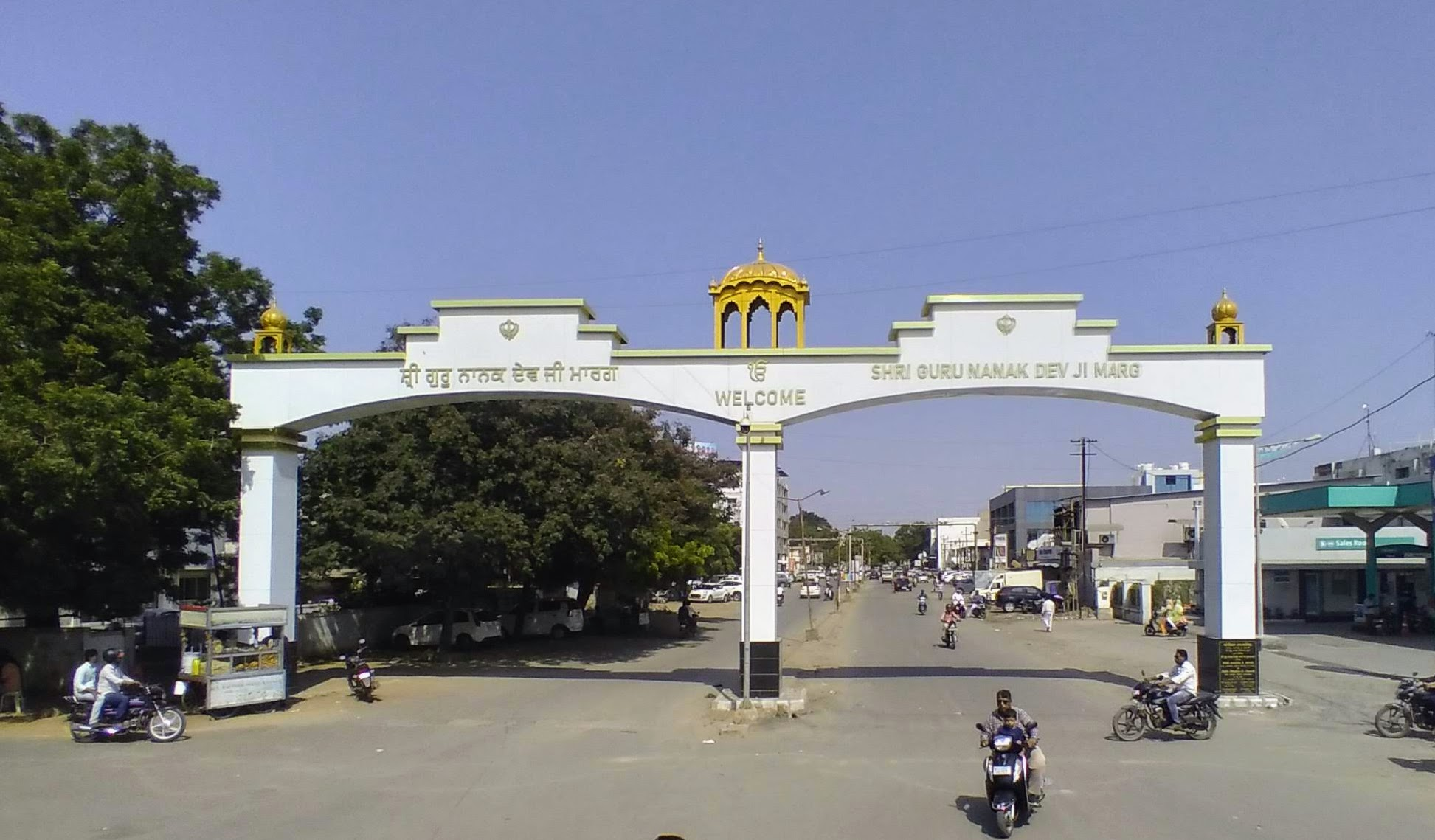
Sri Gurunanak Dev ji Marg

== Demographics ==
In 2011 the population of Gandhidham was 247,992, which consisted of 131,484 males and 116,508 females.

=== Language ===
According to the 2011 Census, Gujarati speakers are a majority in Bhuj, followed by Hindi, Kachchhi, Sindhi and others.

Languages of Kutch district (2011)
1. Gujarati (46.5%)
2. Hindi (18.1%)
3. Kachchhi (12.5%)
4. Sindhi (8.89%)
5. others (14.0%)

== Education ==
Schools in the area include

CBSE SCHOOLS

- Sixth star pre school & day care Center
- D.A.V. Public School
- Delhi Public High School (D.P.S)
- Poddar International School
- Kendriya Vidyalaya at IFFCO colony
- Kendriya Vidyalaya at Railway colony
- Kakubhai Parikh School (K.P.S)
- Amarchand Singhvi School
- Savvy International School
- The Fusion School
- St. Thomas School
- Atmiya Vidyapeeth School
- Welspun Vidya Mandir(W. V. M)
- Mount Litera Zee School
- Academic Heights Public School

STATE BOARD ENGLISH MEDIUM SCHOOLS

- Mount Carmel High School
- Saint Xavier's at Adipur
- Modern School, Gandhidham
- P.N. Amersey High School
- St. Mary's School at Kandla
- Guru Nanak Public School, Adipur
- Shree Swaminarayan Vidyalaya
- Ananda Marga High School in DC-2, Rambaug road (English Medium)
- Ananda Marga Primary school in Sector-7
- Guru Nanak School for Excellence
- Sadhu Vaswani International School
- Excelsior Model School, Adipur
- Kairali English School
- Cambridge School, Gandhidham
- Shri Krishna Public School.
- Aum Vidya Mandir at IFFCO colony

GUJARATI MEDIUM SCHOOLS

- Sardar Vallabh bhai Patel High School
- Saint Xavier's at Adipur
- RP Patel High School
- Shri Saraswati Vidyalaya
- Shri Sahyog Saraswati Vidhya Mandir
- Ambe Bhavnath High School
- M.P. Patel Kanya Vidyalaya

HINDI MEDIUM SCHOOLS

- Dr. C. G. High School
- Maitri School at Adipur
- Maitri Kanya Maha Vidyalaya at Adipur
- Adarsh Maha Vidyalaya

For professional courses like Chartered Accountancy and Cost & Management Accountancy the national professional accounting body of India like Institute of Chartered Accountants of India and Institute of Cost Accountants of India have opened an examination centre at Adipur.

== College and graduation ==
Colleges for graduation and higher studies are Tolani College of Science & Arts, Tolani Commerce College, Pharmacy college and Diploma in Engineering, Management Institute situated nearby in Adipur. DNV International Educational College is situated in Bharat Nagar; the courses provided are BCA and BBA. Gandhidham Institution of Medical Sciences (GIMS) has been started for aspiring Medical/ Pharmacy students/

== Transport ==
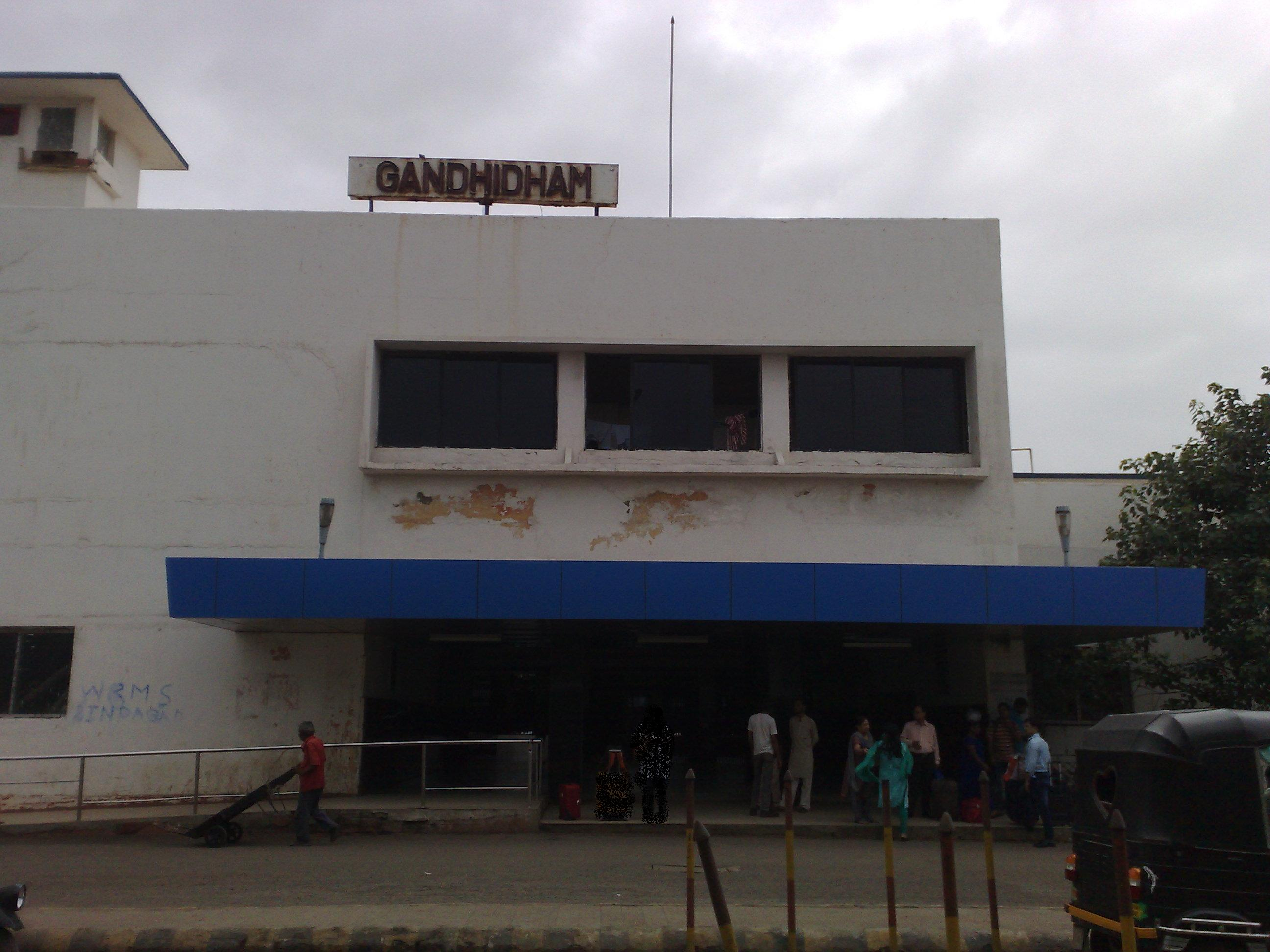
Gandhidham Junction main entrance

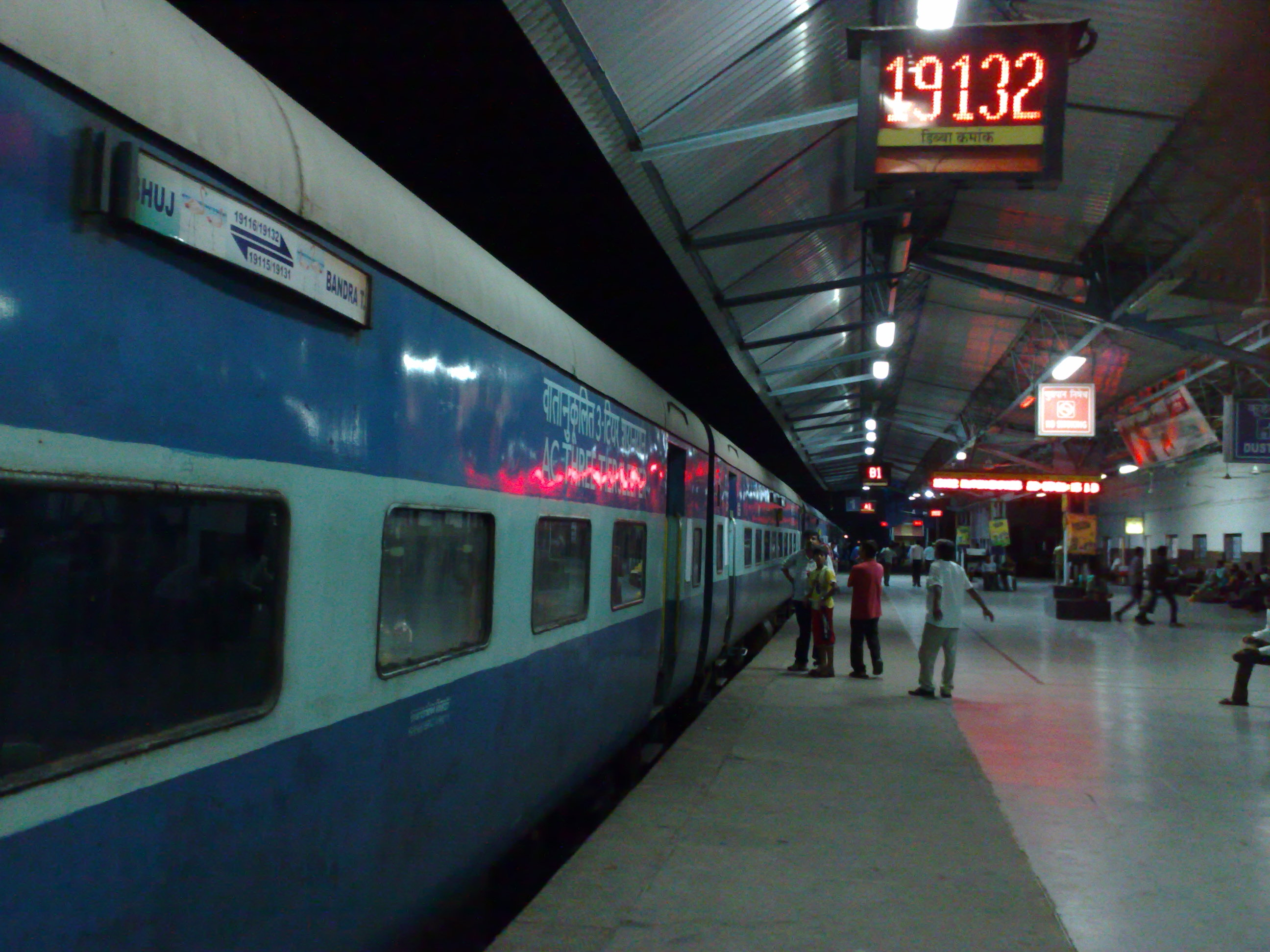
Kutch Express at Gandhidham Railway Station

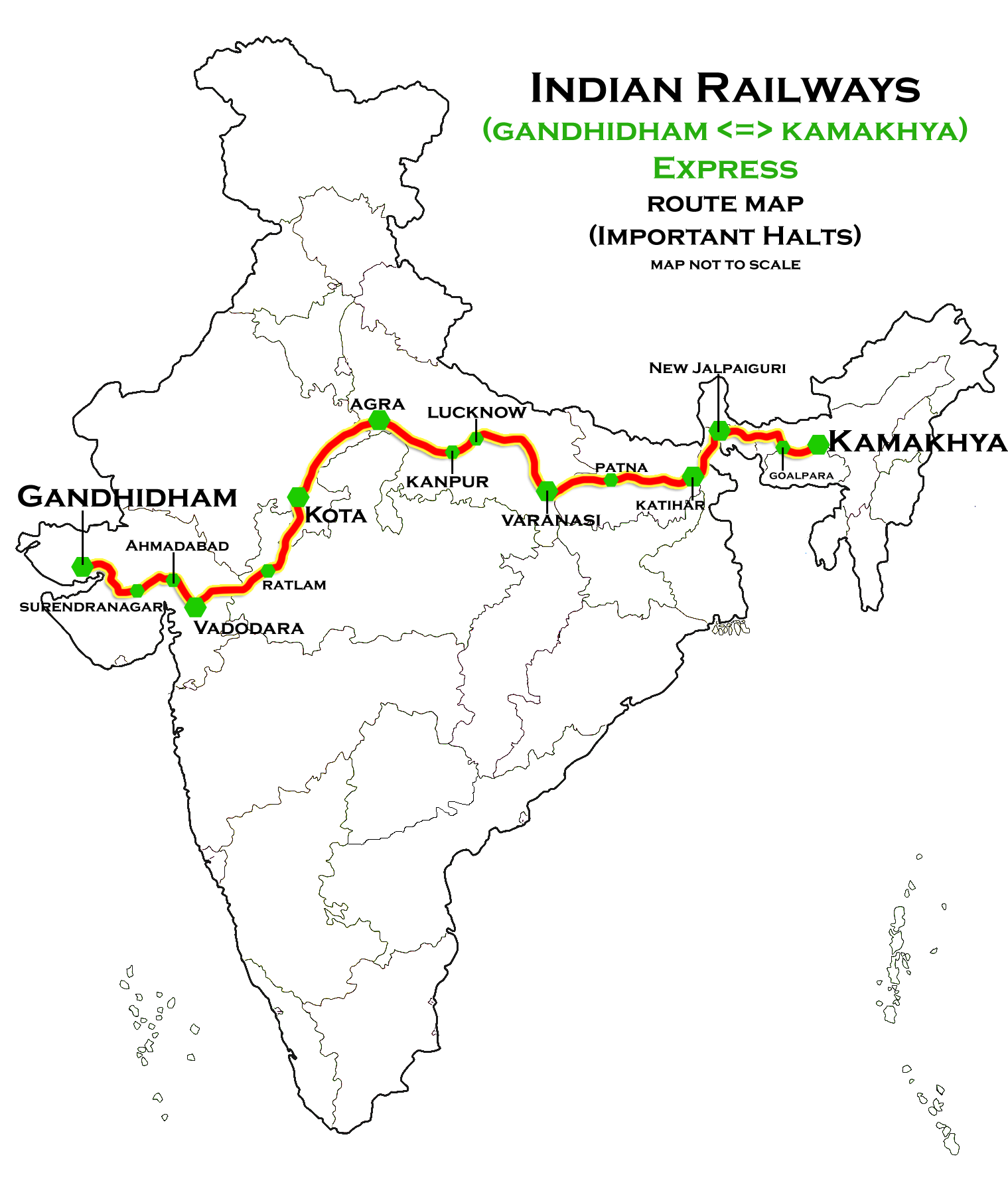
(Gandhidham - Kamakhya) Express route map

Gandhidham is connected by road and rail to the rest of India. Transport Nagar, on the outskirts of Gandhidham, is the hub of all major transport activity. There are trains to, Ahmedabad, Allahabad, Varanasi, Kanpur, Agra, Lucknow, Faizabad, Patna, Jodhpur, Ajmer, Alwar, Abu Road, Jaipur, Mumbai, Vadodara, Surat, Yesvantpur, Kalyan, Bhiwandi, Pune, Kolkata, Ahmedabad, Indore, Bangalore, Thiruvananthapuram, Kochi, Kollam, Kota, Delhi, Durg, Guwahati, Puri, Chengannur, Jalgaon, Bhusaval, Raipur, Vizag, Nagercoil, Vijayawada, Warangal, Rajahmundry and several other cities. Many private companies operate bus services to major cities in Gujarat like Ahmedabad and Rajkot. India's largest port, Kandla is around 13.8 km from the city. It also has connectivity to Kandla Airport near village Galpadar. From August 2016 Air connect has started its daily services for Ahmedabad and Surat. They announced one flight from Mumbai to Kandla Airport (Gandhidham).

=== Trains ===
Train No.	Train name	Runs from source	Destination	Departure days	Arrival days
20803/20804	Visakhapatnam–Gandhidham Express	Gandhidham	Visakhapatnam	Friday	Sunday
22973/22974	Gandhidham–Puri Weekly Express	Gandhidham	Puri	Wednesday	Friday
16335/16336	Nagarcoil Express	Gandhidham	Nagercoil	Friday	Thursday
16505/16506	Gandhidham–Bangalore City Express	Gandhidham	Bangalore	Tuesday	Monday
11091/11092	Ahimsa Express	Bhuj	Pune	Wednesday	Tuesday
15667/15668	Kamakhya–Gandhidham Express	Gandhidham	Kamakhya	Saturday	Saturday
14312/14311 via Ahmedabad & 14322/14321 via Bhildi	Ala Hazrat Express (via Ahmedabad) Ala Hazrat Express (via Bhildi)	Bhuj	Bareilly	Tuesday, Thursday & Sunday For 14312. Monday, Wednesday, Friday & Saturday For 14322.	Friday, Saturday, Monday For 14311. Tuesday, Wednesday, Thursday & Sunday For 14321.
22829/22830	Shalimar–Bhuj Weekly Superfast Express	Bhuj	Shalimar	Tuesday	Monday
22904/22903	Bandra Terminus–Bhuj AC Superfast Express	Bhuj	Bandra	Monday, Thursday, Saturday	Thursday, Saturday, Monday
12937/12938	Garbha Express	Gandhidham	Howrah	Saturday	Wednesday
12960/12959	Dadar–Bhuj Superfast Express	Bhuj	Dadar	Monday, Thursday	Wednesday, Saturday
14802/14801	Gandhidham–Jodhpur Express	Gandhidham	Jodhpur	Monday, Wednesday, Saturday	Monday, Wednesday, Saturday
22955/22956	Kutch Express	Bhuj	Bandra, Mumbai	Daily	Daily
12993/12994	Gandhidham–Puri Weekly Superfast Express	Gandhidham	Puri	Monday	Wednesday
19116/19115	Sayajinagari Express	Bhuj	Bandra	Daily	Daily

=== Airport ===
The area is served by Kandla airport near Galpadar town. Daily service is available to Mumbai. SpiceJet announced one more flight for Mumbai from 11 July 2017 onward.

== See also ==
- Kandla
- Adipur
- Galpadar
