= Galpadar =

Coordinates: 23.097°N 70.126°E

Galpadar is a village in the Gandhidham Municipal Corporation, within the Kutch District of the Gujarat State of India. It is located at a distance of about 3 km from Gandhidham, 11 km from Anjar and 51 km from Bhuj.The village is one of the 18 villages founded by Mistris of Kutch.

Central Jail of Kutch was shifted to Galpadar from Bhuj.

== Climate ==
Galpaxat has a desert climate that is considered to be BWh according to the Koppen-Geiger classification of climates.

The average annual temperature is 24.6 °C. The average rainfall is 379 mm.
