= Hapa–Shri Mata Vaishno Devi Katra Superfast Express =

Train in India

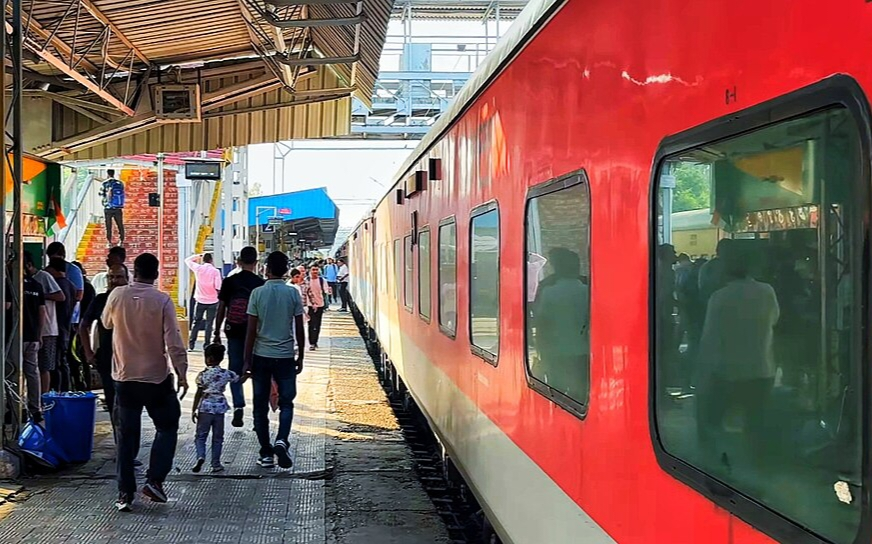
- Hapa -SVDK Express At Panipat Junction railway station

Overview
- Service type: Superfast
- First service: 1 January 1990; 36 years ago
- Current operator: Northern Railway

Route
- Termini: Hapa (HAPA); SMVD Katra (SDVK)
- Stops: 29
- Distance travelled: 2,059 km (1,279 mi)
- Average journey time: 32 hrs 45 mins
- Service frequency: Weekly. (Note: Runs one day in a week for every direction.)
- Train number: 12475 / 12476

On-board services
- Classes: AC 2 tier, AC 3 tier, Sleeper class, General Unreserved
- Seating arrangements: No
- Sleeping arrangements: Yes
- Catering facilities: Available
- Observation facilities: Large windows
- Baggage facilities: Available
- Other facilities: Below the seats

Technical
- Rolling stock: LHB coach
- Track gauge: 1,676 mm (5 ft 6 in)
- Operating speed: 59 km/h (37 mph) average including halts.

The 12475/12476 Hapa–Shri Mata Vaishno Devi Katra Superfast Express is a Superfast train of the Indian Railways connecting Hapa in Gujarat and Shri Mata Vaishno Devi Katra of Jammu and Kashmir. It is currently being operated with 12475/12476 train numbers on a weekly basis.

== Coach composition ==
This train now has new modern LHB rakes replaced by outdated ICF rakes. The train consists of 22 coaches:

- 2 AC II Tier
- 5 AC III Tier
- 10 Sleeper Coaches
- 1 Pantry Car
- 2 General
- 2 End On Generation

== Service ==
The 12475/Hapa–Shri Mata Vaishno Devi Katra Superfast Express has an average speed of 62 km/h and covers 2059 km in 33 hrs 10 mins.

The 12476/Shri Mata Vaishno Devi Katra–Hapa Superfast Express has an average speed of 63 km/h and covers 2059 km in 32 hrs 35 mins.

== Route and halts ==
The important halts of the train are:

- Hapa
- Rajkot Junction
- Wankaner Junction
- Surendranagar Junction
- Viramgam Junction
- Ahmedabad Junction
- Nadiad Junction
- Anand Junction
- Chhayapuri (Vadodara)
- Godhra Junction
- Dahod
- Meghnagar
- Bamnia
- Ratlam Junction
- Nagda Junction
- Vikramgarh Alot
- Shamgarh
- Bahwani Mandi
- Ramganj Mandi Junction
- Kota Junction
- Sawai Madhopur Junction
- Bharatpur Junction
- Mathura Junction
- Hazrat Nizamuddin
- New Delhi
- Panipat Junction
- Ambala Cantonment Junction
- Ludhiana Junction
- Jalandhar Cantonment Junction
- Pathankot Cantonment
- Kathua
- Jammu Tawi
- MCTM Udhampur
- Shri Mata Vaishno Devi Katra

== Schedule ==
Train number	Station code	Departure station	Departure time	Departure day	Arrival station	Arrival time	Arrival day
12475	HAPA	Hapa	08:30 AM	Tuesday	Katra	17:40 PM	Wednesday
12476	SVDK	Katra	09:55 AM	Monday	Hapa	18:30 PM	Tuesday

== Traction ==
Both trains are hauled by a Vatva Loco Shed-based WDM-3A diesel locomotive from Hapa to Ahmedabad Junction and from Ahmedabad Junction, it is hauled by a Vadodara Loco Shed-based WAP-4 electric locomotive or by WAP-7 or WAP-4 of Ghaziabad Loco Shed up till Katra and vice versa.

== Rake sharing ==
This train shares its rake with

- 12471/12472 Swaraj Express
- 12473/12474 Gandhidham–Shri Mata Vaishno Devi Katra Sarvodaya Express
- 12477/12478 Jamnagar–Shri Mata Vaishno Devi Katra Superfast Express

== See also ==
- Ahmedabad Junction railway station
- Shri Mata Vaishno Devi Katra railway station
