= Indore–Pune Express (via Panvel) =

Train in India

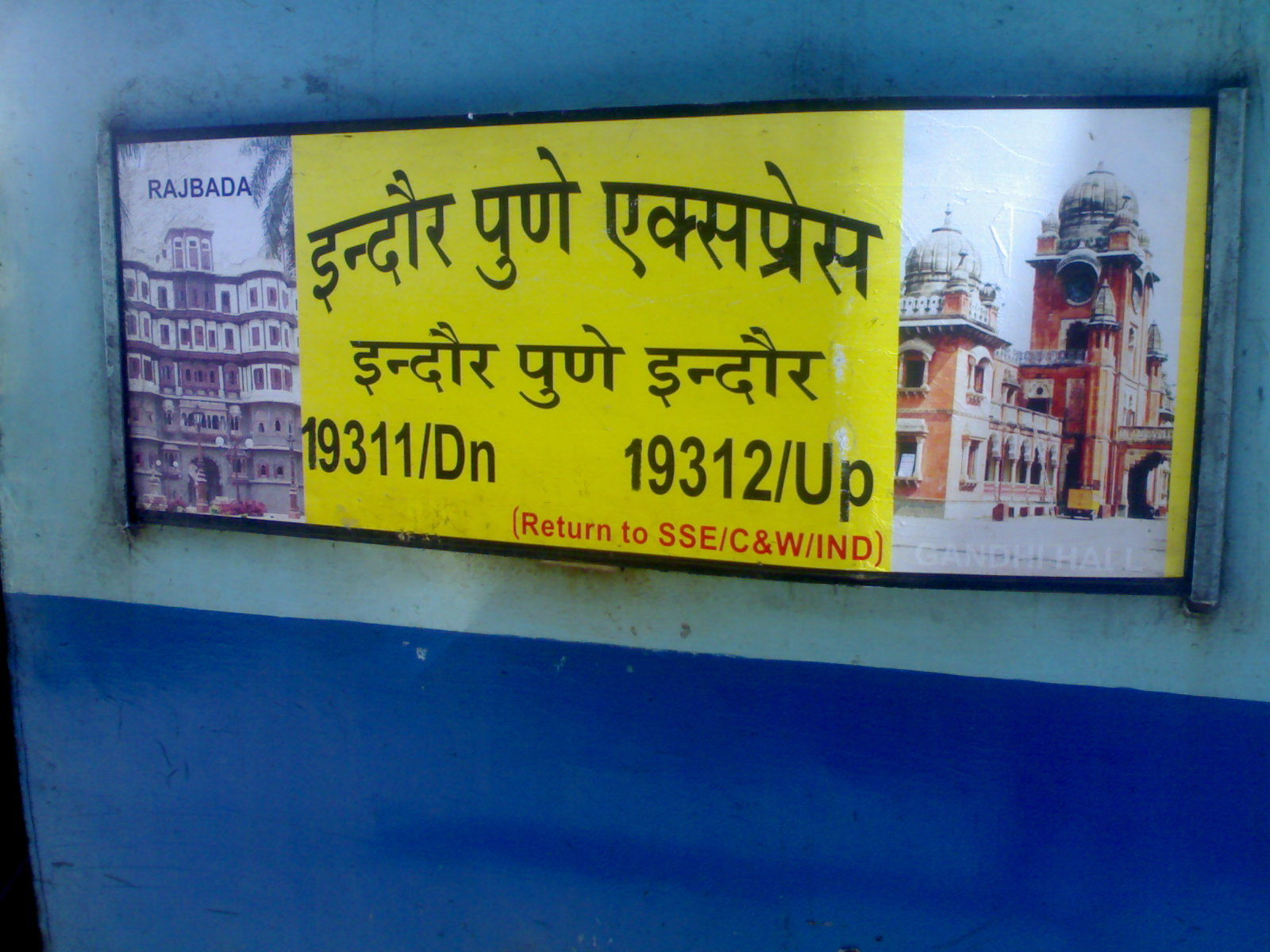

Overview
- Service type: Mail/Express
- Locale: Madhya Pradesh, Gujarat, Maharashtra
- First service: 28 June 2016; 9 years ago
- Last service: 2022; 4 years ago
- Current operator: Western Railway

Route
- Termini: Indore Junction; Pune Junction
- Stops: 16
- Distance travelled: 966 km (600 mi)
- Average journey time: 19 hrs 35 mins
- Service frequency: Bi-weekly
- Train number: 19311/19312

On-board services
- Classes: AC 2 Tier, AC 3 Tier, Sleeper class, General Unreserved
- Seating arrangements: Yes
- Sleeping arrangements: Yes
- Catering facilities: E-catering
- Baggage facilities: Yes

Technical
- Rolling stock: ICF Coaches
- Track gauge: 1,676 mm (5 ft 6 in)
- Operating speed: 110 km/h (68 mph)Maximum Permissible Speed; 49 km/h (30 mph) Average

The 19311/19312 Indore–Pune Express via Panvel was an Mail/Express train of the Indian Railways, which runs between Indore, the largest city and commercial hub of Central Indian state Madhya Pradesh and Pune, the commercial hub of Maharashtra.

19311/19312 was also the old numbering for 22943/44 Daund-Indore Superfast but in July 2016, 22943/44 (then called Pune Indore Express) got promoted to superfast service and railways had to change its number, and then 19311/13 Indore-Pune Express via Panvel was announced as a separate train.

It was the second rail connection between Indore and Pune, other being Indore–Pune Superfast Express. This is first train from Indore to Navi Mumbai connecting Indore to Kalyan, Bhiwandi, Panvel, Karjat stations of Navi Mumbai.

Currently this train is not operational since its predecessor train 22943/44 Daund-Indore Superfast has been made a daily service since its inception after COVID-19 breakout in India which had made the Indian Railways come to a halt.

== Coach composition ==
The train consisted of 17 coaches:

- 1 AC II Tier
- 3 AC III Tier
- 7 Sleeper class
- 4 General Unreserved
- 2 Seating cum Luggage Rake

== Service ==
- 19311/Pune–Indore Express had an average speed of 54 km/h and covers 966 km in 17 hrs 55 mins.
- 19312/Indore–Pune Express had an average speed of 49 km/h and covers 966 km in 19 hrs 35 mins.

== Route and halts ==
The important halts of the train are:

- Indore Junction
- Dewas Junction
- Ujjain Junction
- Nagda Junction
- Khachrod
- Ratlam Junction
- Meghnagar
- Dahod
- Godhra Junction
- Vadodara Junction
- Surat
- Palghar
- Vasai Road
- Bhiwandi Road
- Panvel
- Karjat
- Lonavala
- Chinchwad
- Pune Junction

== Schedule ==
Train number	Station code	Departure station	Departure time	Departure day	Arrival station	Arrival time	Arrival day
19311	PUNE	Pune Junction	17:30 PM	Sun, Wed	Indore Junction	11:25 AM	Mon, Thu
19312	INDB	Indore Junction	16:50 PM	Tue, Sat	Pune Junction	12:25 PM	Sun, Wed

== Traction ==
Both trains are hauled by a Vadodara Electric Loco Shed-based WAP-5 or WAP-4E electric locomotives.

== See also ==
- Avantika Superfast Express
- Daund-Indore Superfast
