= Od railway station =

Railway station in Gujarat, India

General information
- Location: Od, Anand district, Gujarat; India
- Coordinates: 22°39′25″N 73°05′06″E
- Elevation: 49 metres (161 ft)
- System: Indian Railway Station
- Owner: Ministry of Railways, Indian Railways
- Operator: Western Railway
- Line: Anand–Godhra section
- Platforms: 1
- Tracks: 1

Construction
- Structure type: Standard (On Ground)
- Parking: No

Other information
- Status: Functioning
- Station code: OD
- Zone(s): Western Railway
- Division(s): Vadodara
Location
- Location within India Location within Gujarat

Od railway station is a railway station on the Western Railway network in the state of Gujarat, India. Od railway station is connected by rail to Anand Junction and Godhra Junction.

Od, on the Anand–Godhra section of Western Railway zone and Ib, near Jharsuguda are the shortest station name in India.

== See also ==
- Anand district
