= Indore–Daund Superfast Express =

Train in India

Overview
- Service type: Superfast Express
- Locale: Madhya Pradesh, Gujarat & Maharashtra
- First service: 1 January 1999; 27 years ago
- Current operator: Western Railway

Route
- Termini: Indore Junction (INDB); Daund Junction (DD)
- Stops: 17
- Distance travelled: 1,038 km (645 mi)
- Average journey time: 18 hrs 30 mins
- Service frequency: Daily
- Train number: 22943 / 22944

On-board services
- Classes: AC First, AC 2 Tier, AC 3 Tier, Sleeper Class, General Unreserved
- Seating arrangements: Yes
- Sleeping arrangements: Yes
- Catering facilities: On-board catering, E-catering
- Observation facilities: Large windows
- Baggage facilities: Available
- Other facilities: Below the seats

Technical
- Rolling stock: LHB coach
- Track gauge: 1,676 mm (5 ft 6 in)
- Operating speed: 130 km/h (81 mph) maximum, 57 km/h (35 mph) average including halts.
- Rake sharing: Rake sharing with 19315/19316 Veer Bhumi Chittaurgarh Express.

The 22943 / 22944 Indore–Daund Superfast Express is a superfast train of the Indian Railways which runs between Indore Junction in Madhya Pradesh and Daund Junction in Maharashtra. In late 2020 its rakes had been upgraded to LHB coaches.

This train earlier had the numbers 19311/19312 until July 2016, when railways decided to upgrade its service from Mail/Express to Superfast and introduced Indore-Pune Express which went through Karjat-Panvel-Vasai Road route, instead of Karjat-Kalyan-Vasai Road.

Until late 2020s, This train used to run till Pune only, later on railways extended it to Daund for traffic regulation purposes at Pune Railway Junction.

It is the only rail connection between Indore and Daund since Indore–Pune Express (via Panvel) got cancelled permanently.

== Service ==
- 22943/Daund–Indore Superfast Express has an average speed of 56 km/h and covers 1038 km in 18 hrs 30 mins.
- 22944/Indore–Daund Superfast Express has an average speed of 58 km/h and covers 1038 km in 18 hrs 00 mins.
- It has a maximum permissible speed of 130 km/h.

== Route and halts ==
The important halts of the train are;

- Indore Junction
- Dewas Junction
- Ujjain Junction
- Nagda Junction
- Khachrod
- Ratlam Junction
- Meghnagar
- Dahod
- Godhra Junction
- Vadodara Junction
- Surat
- Vasai Road
- Bhiwandi Road
- Kalyan Junction
- Karjat
- Lonavala
- Chinchwad
- Pune Junction
- Daund Junction.

== Schedule ==
Train number	Station code	Departure station	Departure time	Departure day	Arrival station	Arrival time	Arrival day
22943	DD	Daund Junction	2:00 PM	Daily	Indore Junction	08:30 AM	Daily
22944	INDB	Indore Junction	4:30 PM	Daily	Daund Junction	10:30 AM	Daily

== Coach composition ==
Loco	1	2	3	4	5	6	7	8	9	10	11	12	13	14	15	16	17	18	19	20	21	22
WAP5/7	SLR	UR	UR	S8	S7	S6	S5	S4	S3	S2	S1	B6	B5	B4	B3	B2	B1	A2	A1	H1	UR	EOG

*Note – The coach composition shown here is for 22943 (Daund to Indore), For 22944 (Indore to Daund) the composition will be flipped.

== Rake sharing ==
The train shares its rake with 19315/19316 Veer Bhumi Express.

== Traction ==
earlier was WAP-5. It is hauled by a Vadodara Loco Shed based WAP-7 electric locomotive on its entire journey.

== See also ==
- Avantika Express
- Indore–Pune Express (via Panvel)
