= Jamnagar–Shri Mata Vaishno Devi Katra Superfast Express =

Train in India

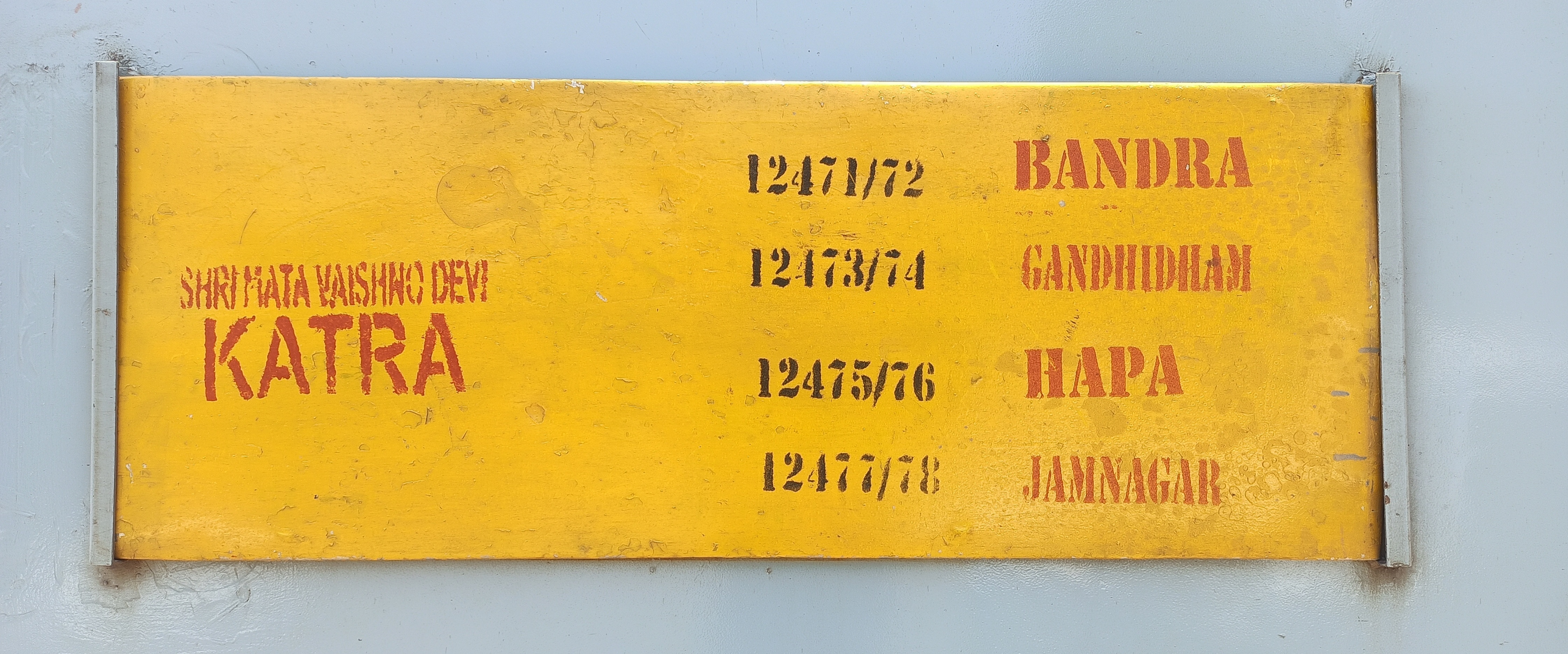

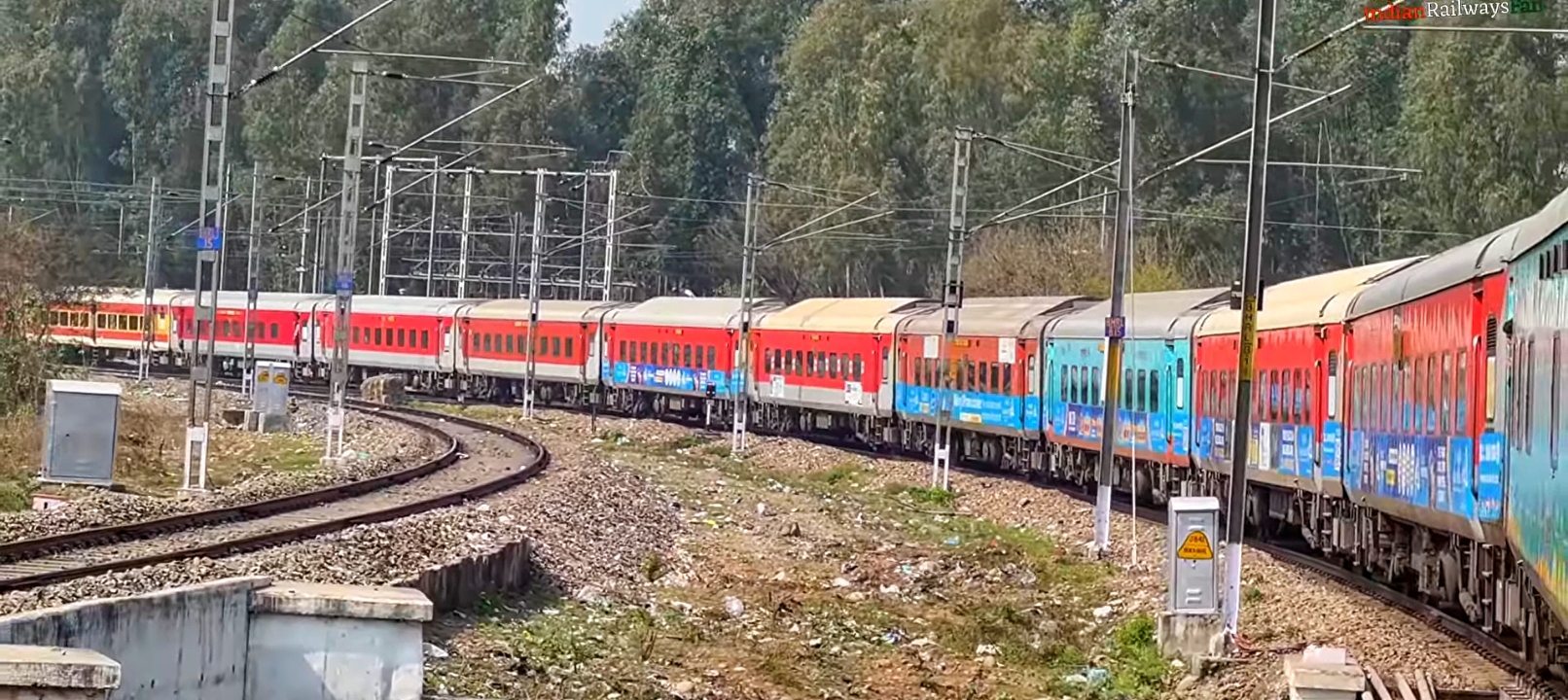
- Jamnagar - SVDK Express At Jammu Tawi

Overview
- Service type: Superfast
- First service: 1 January 1990; 36 years ago
- Current operator: Northern Railway

Route
- Termini: Jamnagar (JAM); SMVD Katra (SDVK)
- Stops: 31
- Distance travelled: 2,068 km (1,285 mi)
- Average journey time: 32 hrs 30 mins
- Service frequency: Weekly. (Note: Runs one day in a week for every direction.)
- Train number: 12477 / 12478

On-board services
- Classes: AC 2 tier, AC 3 tier, Sleeper Class, General Unreserved
- Seating arrangements: No
- Sleeping arrangements: Yes
- Catering facilities: Available
- Observation facilities: Large windows
- Baggage facilities: Available
- Other facilities: Below the seats

Technical
- Rolling stock: LHB coach
- Track gauge: 1,676 mm (5 ft 6 in)
- Operating speed: 59 km/h (37 mph) average including halts.

The 12477 / 12478 Jamnagar–Shri Mata Vaishno Devi Katra Superfast Express is a Superfast train of the Indian Railways connecting Jamnagar Junction in Gujarat and Shri Mata Vaishno Devi Katra of Jammu and Kashmir. It is currently being operated with 12477/12478 train numbers on a weekly basis.

== Coach composition ==
The train has Modern LHB rakes with a maximum speed of 130 km/h. The train consists of 22 coaches :

- 1 AC First
- 2 AC II Tier
- 6 AC III Tier
- 6 Sleeper Coaches
- 1 Pantry Car
- 2 General
- 2 End On Generation

== Service ==
The 12477/Jamnagar–Shri Mata Vaishno Devi Katra Superfast Express has an average speed of 62 km/h and covers 2068 km in 33 hrs 25 mins.

The 12478/Shri Mata Vaishno Devi Katra–Jamnagar Superfast Express has an average speed of 63 km/h and covers 2068 km in 32 hrs 50 mins.

== Route and halts ==
The important halts of the train are:

- Jamnagar
- Hapa
- Rajkot Junction
- Wankaner Junction
- Surendranagar Junction
- Viramgam Junction
- Ahmedabad Junction
- Nadiad Junction
- Anand Junction
- Chhayapuri (Vadodara)
- Godhra Junction
- Dahod
- Meghnagar
- Ratlam Junction
- Nagda Junction
- Vikramgarh Alot
- Ramganj Mandi Junction
- Kota Junction
- Sawai Madhopur Junction
- Bharatpur Junction
- Mathura Junction
- Hazrat Nizamuddin
- New Delhi
- Panipat Junction
- Ambala Cantonment Junction
- Ludhiana Junction
- Jalandhar Cantonment Junction
- Pathankot Cantonment
- Kathua
- Jammu Tawi
- Udhampur
- Shri Mata Vaishno Devi Katra

== Schedule ==
Train number	Station code	Departure station	Departure time	Departure day	Arrival station	Arrival time	Arrival day
12477	JAM	Jamnagar	08:15 AM	Wednesday	Katra	17:40 PM	Thursday
12478	SVDK	Katra	09:55 AM	Sunday	Jamnagar	18:45 PM	Monday

== Traction ==
Both trains are hauled by a Vatva Loco Shed-based WDM 3A or Sabarmati based WDP-4D diesel locomotive from Jamnagar to Ahmedabad and from Ahmedabad it is hauled by WAP-7 of Vadodara or Ghaziabad based electric locomotive up till Shri Mata Vaishno Devi Katra and vice versa.

== Rake sharing ==
This train shares its rake with

- 12471/12472 Swaraj Express
- 12475/12476 Hapa–Shri Mata Vaishno Devi Katra Superfast Express
- 12473/12474 Gandhidham - Shri Mata Vaishno Devi Katra Sarvodaya Express

== See also ==
- Jamnagar railway station
- Shri Mata Vaishno Devi Katra railway station
