= Thasra railway station =

Railway station in Gujarat, India

Thasra

General information
- Location: Thasra, Kheda district, Gujarat; India
- Coordinates: 22°47′51″N 73°13′14″E
- Elevation: 64 metres (210 ft)
- System: Indian Railway Station
- Owner: Ministry of Railways, Indian Railways
- Operator: Western Railway
- Line: Anand–Godhra section
- Platforms: 1
- Tracks: 1

Construction
- Structure type: Standard (On Ground)
- Parking: No

Other information
- Status: Functioning
- Station code: TAS
- Zone(s): Western Railway
- Division(s): Vadodara
Location
- Location within India Location within Gujarat

Thasra railway station is a railway station on the Western Railway network in the state of Gujarat, India. Thasra railway station is connected by rail to Anand Junction and Godhra Junction.

== See also ==
- Kheda district
