= Chhayapuri railway station =

Railway station in Gujarat, India

Chhayapuri

General information
- Location: Near Chhani Toll Naka, Vadodara, Gujarat; India
- Coordinates: 22°22′16″N 73°09′57″E
- Elevation: 41 metres (135 ft)
- System: Indian Railway Station
- Owner: Indian Railways
- Operator: Western Railway
- Line: New Delhi–Mumbai main line
- Platforms: 2
- Tracks: 4
- Connections: Auto stand

Construction
- Structure type: Standard (On Ground)
- Parking: Yes
- Accessible: Available

Other information
- Status: Functioning
- Station code: CYI
- Zone(s): Western Railway
- Division(s): Vadodara

History
- Rebuilt: 2019
Location
- Location within Gujarat Location within India

Chhayapuri railway station (station code:- CYI) is a railway station on the Western Railway network in the state of Gujarat, India. Chhayapuri railway station is 6 km far away from Vadodara Junction. Passenger, Express and Superfast trains halt here.

Recently, Union Minister of State for Railways, Suresh Angadi inaugurated the Chhayapuri railway station on 14 December 2019 in Vadodara. Chhayapuri railway station will now serve as a satellite station of Vadodara to improve mobility and punctuality of trains, reduce vehicular traffic congestion around Vadodara railway station and help in expansion of the city.

== Trains ==
Following Express and Superfast trains halt at Chhayapuri railway station in both directions:

- 12941/42 Parasnath Express
- 19167/68 Ahmedabad - Varanasi Sabarmati Express
- 19165/66 Ahmedabad - Darbhanga Sabarmati Express
- 12947/48 Ahmedabad - Patna Azimabad Express
- 12917/18 Ahmedabad - Hazrat Nizamuddin Gujarat Sampark Kranti Express
- 11463/64 Somnath - Jabalpur Express (via Itarsi)
- 11465/66 Somnath - Jabalpur Express (via Bina)
- 19309/10 Gandhinagar Capital - Indore Shanti Express
- 19575/76 Okha - Nathdwara Express
- 12475/76 Hapa - Shri Mata Vaishno Devi Katra Sarvodaya Superfast Express
- 12477/78 Jamnagar - Shri Mata Vaishno Devi Katra Sindhu Superfast Express
- 12473/74 Gandhidham - Shri Mata Vaishno Devi Katra Sarvodaya Superfast Express
- 15045/46 Gorakhpur - Okha Express
- 22969/70 Okha - Banaras SF Express
- 19489/90 Ahmedabad - Gorakhpur Express

== See also ==
- Vadodara Junction railway station
