= Avantika Superfast Express =

Train in India

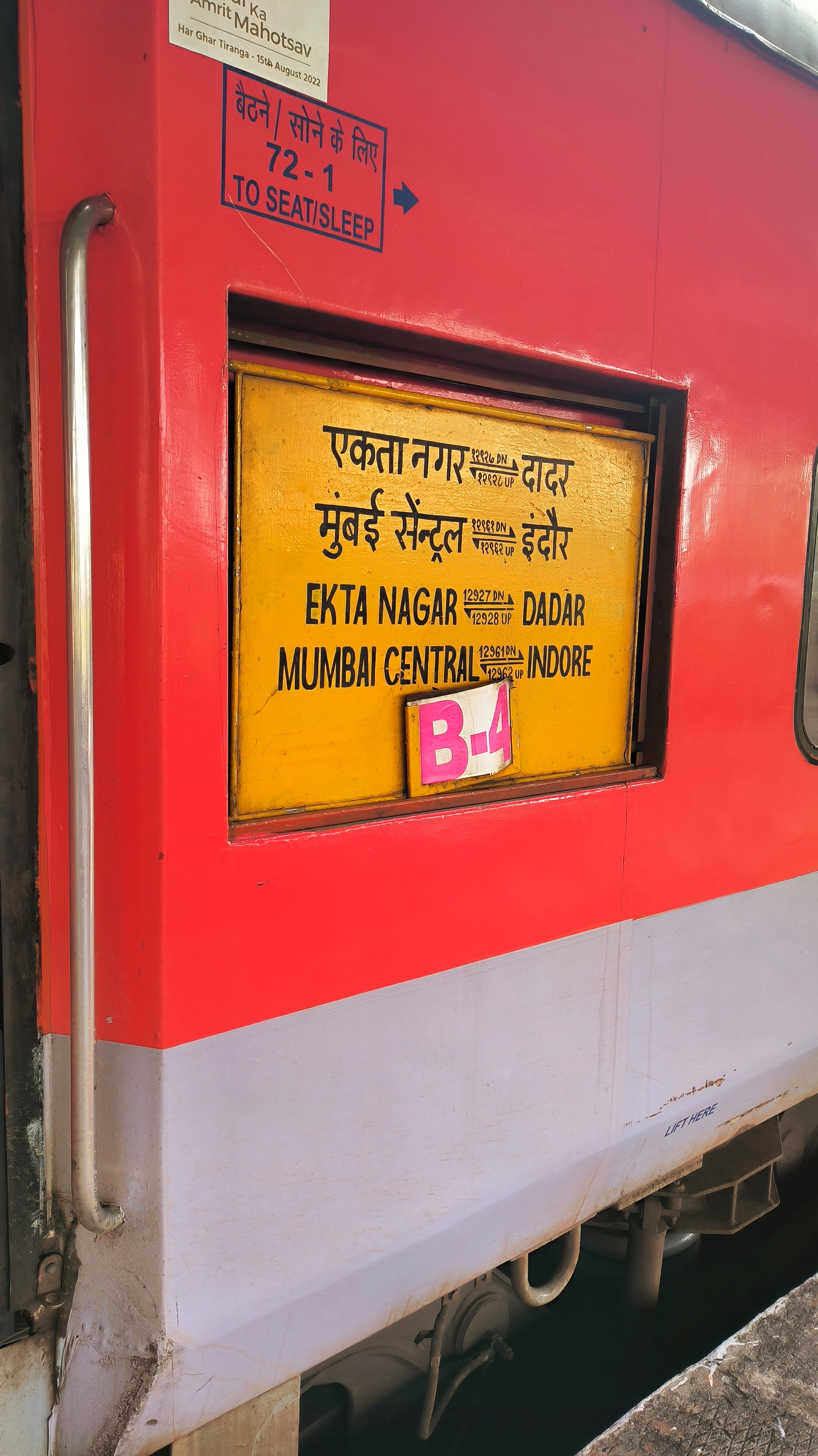
- Avantika SF Express train board

Overview
- Service type: Superfast
- Locale: Maharashtra, Gujarat & Madhya Pradesh
- First service: 1 May 1985; 40 years ago
- Current operator: Western Railway

Route
- Termini: Mumbai Central (MMCT); Indore Junction (INDB)
- Stops: 18
- Distance travelled: 830 km (516 mi)
- Average journey time: 12 Hours 15 Minutes
- Service frequency: Daily
- Train number: 12961 / 12962

On-board services
- Classes: AC First Class, AC 2 Tier, AC 3 Tier, AC 3 Tier Economy, Sleeper Class, General Unreserved
- Seating arrangements: Yes
- Sleeping arrangements: Yes
- Catering facilities: Available but no pantry car
- Observation facilities: Rake sharing with 12927/12928 Dadar Western-Ekta Nagar Express
- Baggage facilities: Available
- Other facilities: Below the seats

Technical
- Rolling stock: LHB coach
- Track gauge: 1,676 mm (5 ft 6 in)
- Operating speed: 130 km/h (81 mph) maximum, 68 km/h (42 mph) average including halts.
Route map
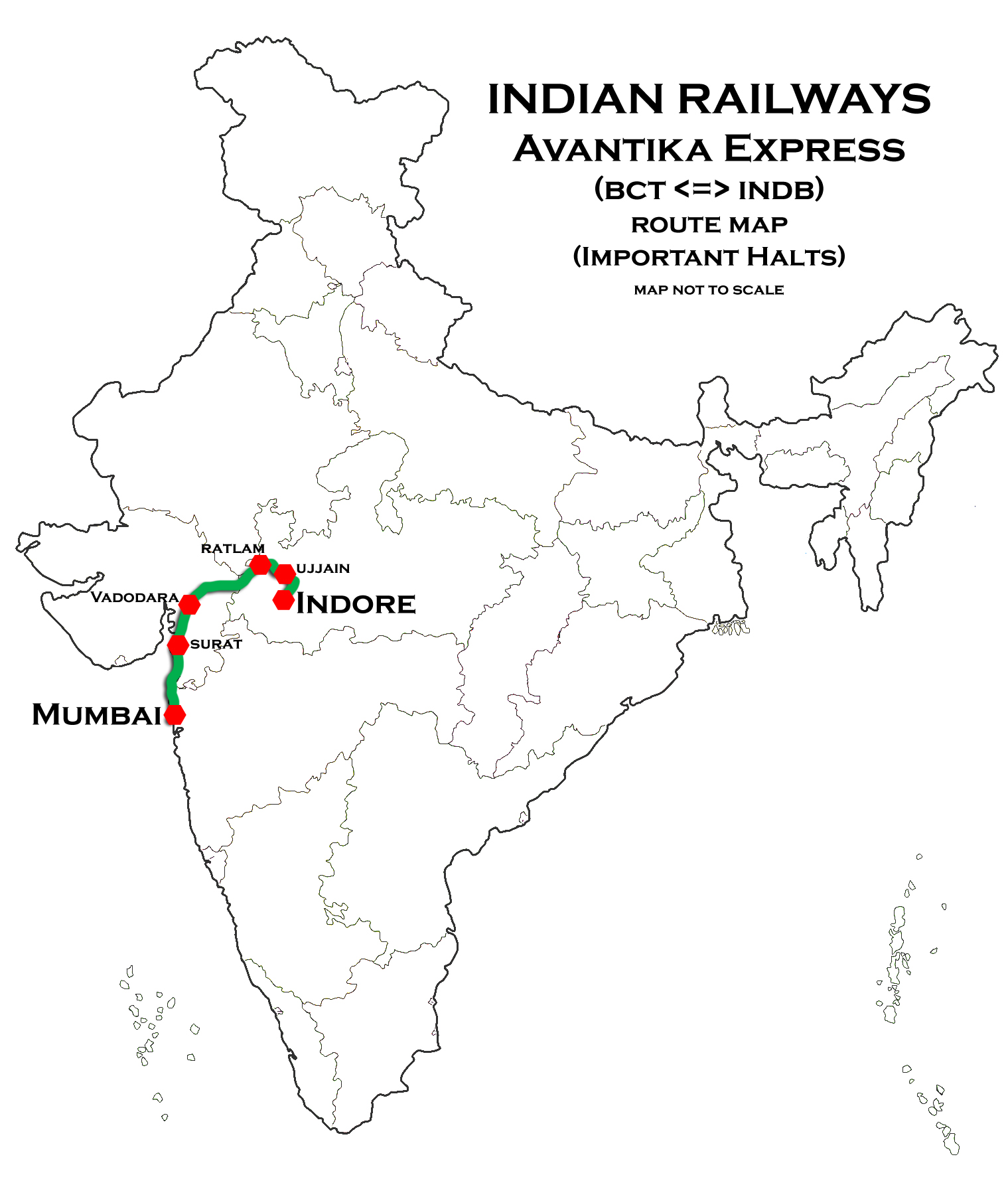

The 12961 / 12962 Avantika Superfast Express is a superfast express train belonging to Indian Railways that runs between Mumbai Central and Indore Junction in India. It is a daily service. It operates as train number 12961 from Mumbai Central to Indore and as train number 12962 in the reverse direction.

== Background ==
When this train was introduced back in 1985 it was called as Bombay–Indore Superfast. Later it was renamed as Avantika Superfast Express. For about a couple of years, in mid 1990s, the termination of train was changed from Mumbai Central to Bandra Terminus (A western Suburban terminus station). The order was reversed and from 1998 the train started going up to Mumbai Central.

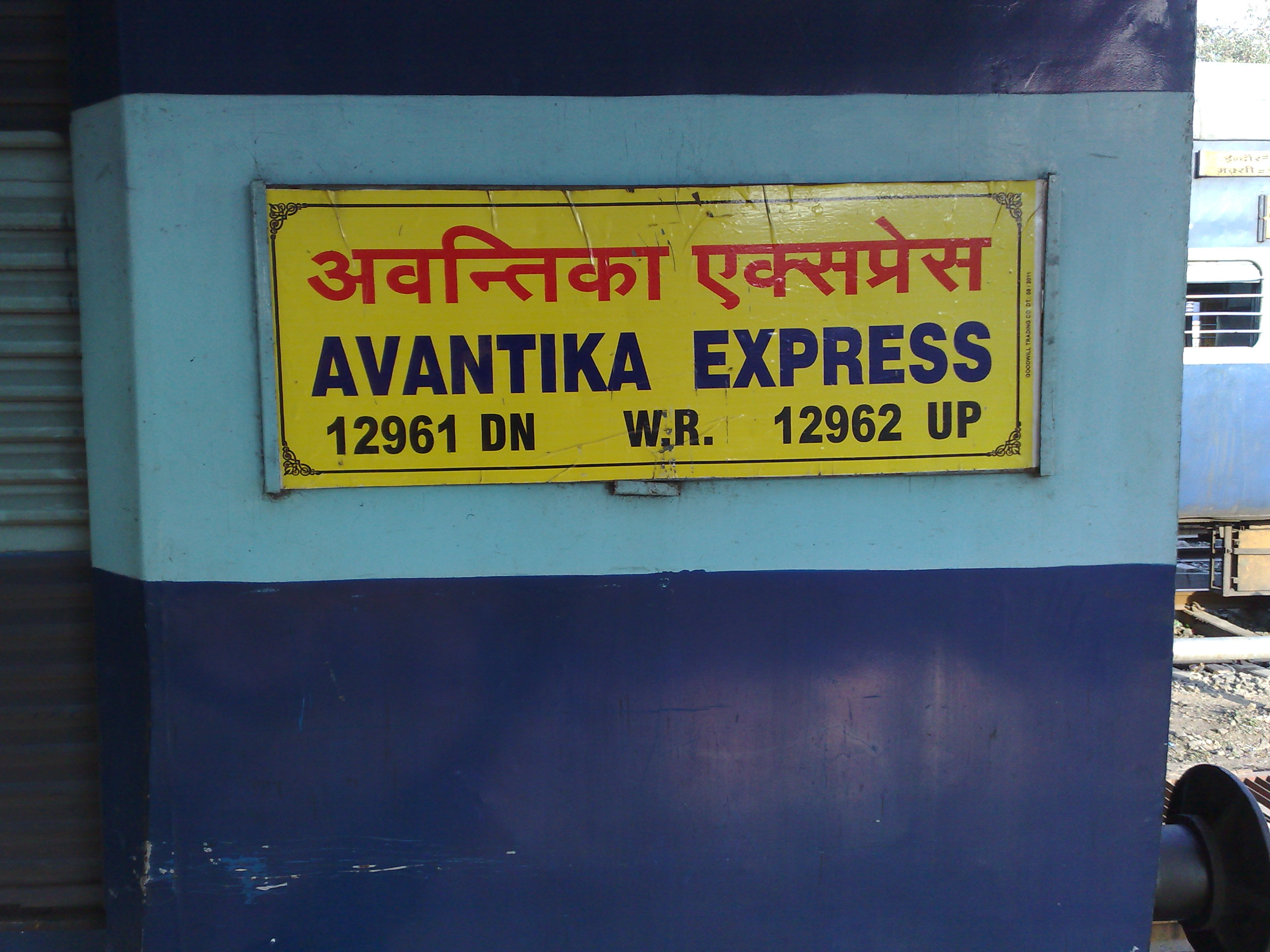

The name Avantika is from 'Avanti', the former name of Ujjain, a historical city located near Indore. This is one of the two Superfast train connections between Indore and Mumbai, the other train is Indore Duronto Express.

In February 2019, it was upgraded to LHB coach.

== Service ==
It is a daily train and covers the distance of 829 kilometres in 12 hours 10 mins as 12961 Avantika SF Express (68 km/h) and 13 hours 5 mins as 12962 Avantika SF Express (64 km/h).

It is one of the fastest train on this route and one of the only two trains connecting MMCT to INDB, the other one being Mumbai Indore Duronto Express which covers the distance of 829 kilometers in just 11 hours 15 mins (73 km/h) due to its premium priority and less stoppages.

Avantika Superfast Express is highly rated amongst its commuters and railfans due to its cleanliness, safety, and punctuality, more often than not this train usually reaches the stations before its scheduled time.

== Schedule ==
12961 Mumbai ⇒ Indore				12962 Indore ⇒ Mumbai			
Station code	Station	Arrival time	Departure time	Station code	Station	Arrival time	Departure time
MMCT	Mumbai Central	–	08:55 PM	INDB	Indore Junction	–	05:40 PM
BVI	Borivali	09:21 PM	09:24 PM	DWX	Dewas Junction	06:06 PM	06:08 PM
VAPI	Vapi	10:51 PM	10:53 PM	UJN	Ujjain Junction	06:50 PM	06:55 PM
BL	Valsad	11:13 PM	11:15 PM	NAD	Nagda Junction	07:48 PM	07:50 PM
NVS	Navsari	11:39 PM	11:41 PM	KUH	Khachrod	08:00 PM	08:02 PM
ST	Surat	12:22 AM	12:27 AM	RTM	Ratlam Junction	08:30 PM	08:35 PM
AKV	Ankleshwar Junction	12:58 AM	01:00 AM	BMI	Bamnia	09:13 PM	09:14 PM
BH	Bharuch Junction	01:10 AM	01:12 AM	THRD	Thandla Road	09:36 PM	09:37 PM
BRC	Vadodara Junction	02:02 AM	02:12 AM	MGN	Meghnagar	09:44 PM	09:46 PM
GDA	Godha Junction	03:13 AM	03:15 AM	DHD	Dahod	10:10 PM	10:12 PM
DHD	Dahod	04:01 AM	04:03 AM	GDA	Godha Junction	11:35 PM	11:37 PM
MGN	Meghnagar	04:26 AM	04:28 AM	BRC	Vadodara Junction	12:30 AM	12:38 AM
THRD	Thandla Road	04:38 AM	04:39 AM	BH	Bharuch Junction	01:23 AM	01:25 AM
BMI	Bamnia	05:09 AM	05:10 AM	—	—	—	—
RTM	Ratlam Junction	05:50 AM	05:55 AM	ST	Surat	02:29 AM	02:34 AM
KUH	Khachrod	06:19 AM	06:21 AM	NVS	Navsari	02:56 AM	02:58 AM
NAD	Nagda Junction	06:38 AM	06:40 AM	BL	Valsad	03:29 AM	03:34 AM
UJN	Ujjain Junction	07:30 AM	07:35 AM	VAPI	Vapi	03:50 AM	03:52 AM
DWX	Dewas Junction	08:10 AM	08:12 AM	BVI	Borivali	05:38 AM	05:41 AM
INDB	Indore Junction	09:10 AM	–	MMCT	Mumbai Central	06:30 AM	–

== Coaches ==
Coach composition may be amended at the discretion of Indian Railways depending on demand. In February 2019, it was upgraded to LHB coach from ICF coach.

Loco	1	2	3	4	5	6	7	8	9	10	11	12	13	14	15	16	17	18	19	20	21	22
LOCO	EoG	GS	GS	GS	GS	S1	S2	S3	S4	S5	S6	M1	M2	B1	B2	B3	B4	A1	A2	A3	H1	SLR

*Note – The coach composition shown here is for 12961 (Mumbai to Indore).For 12962 (Indore to Mumbai) the composition will be flipped.

== Gallery ==
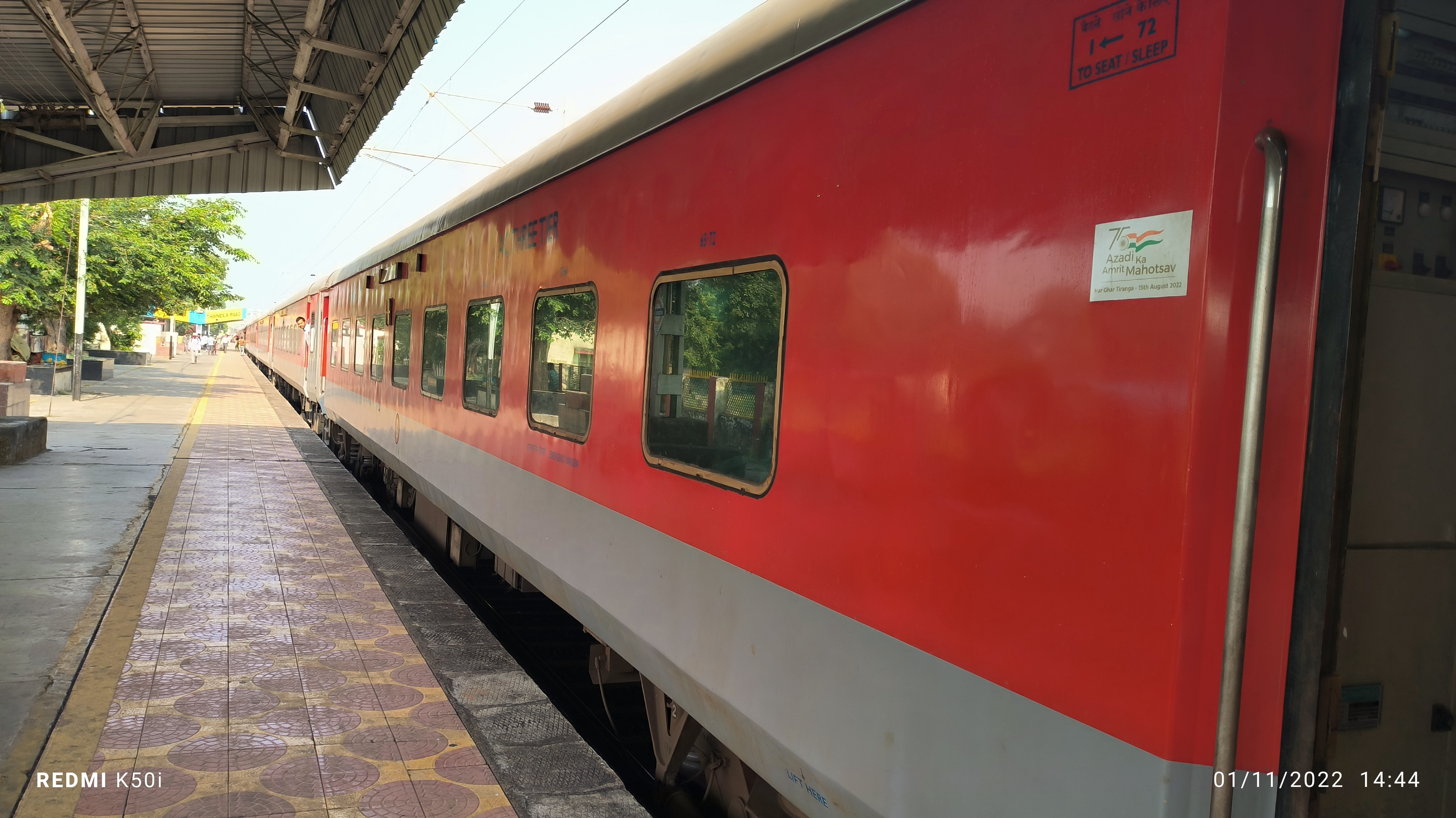

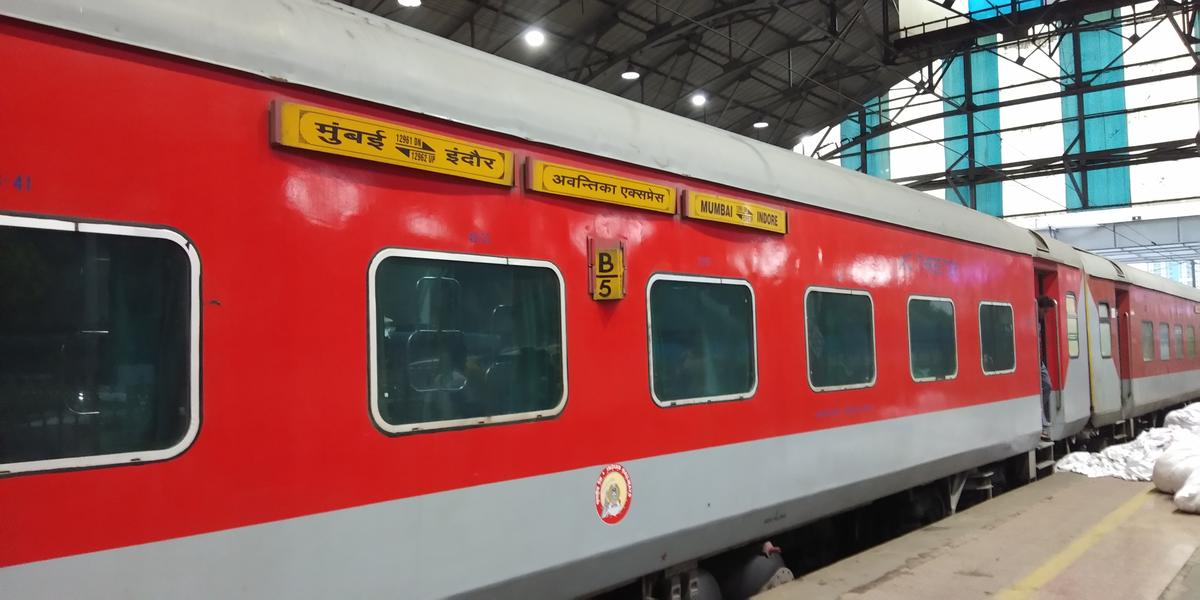
AC Coaches

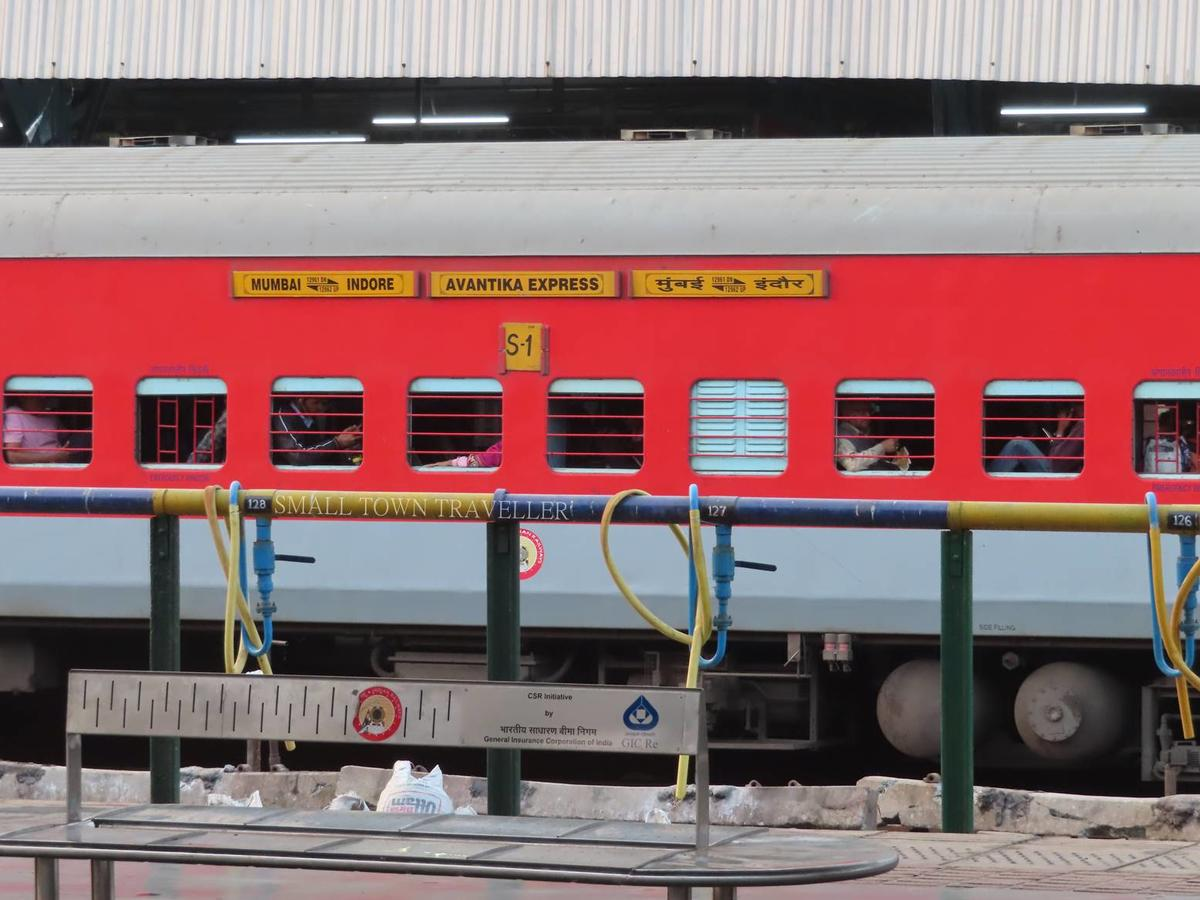
Sleeper Coaches

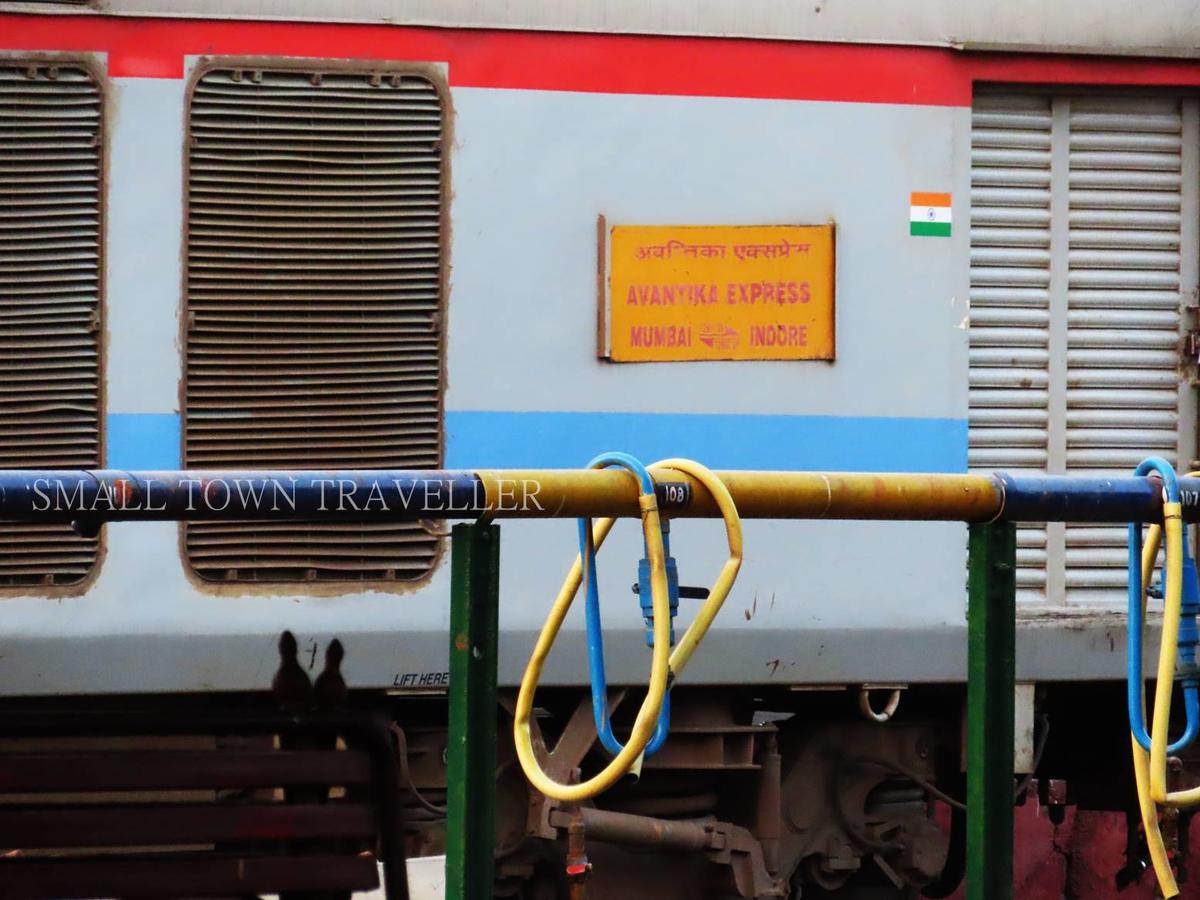
Generator Car

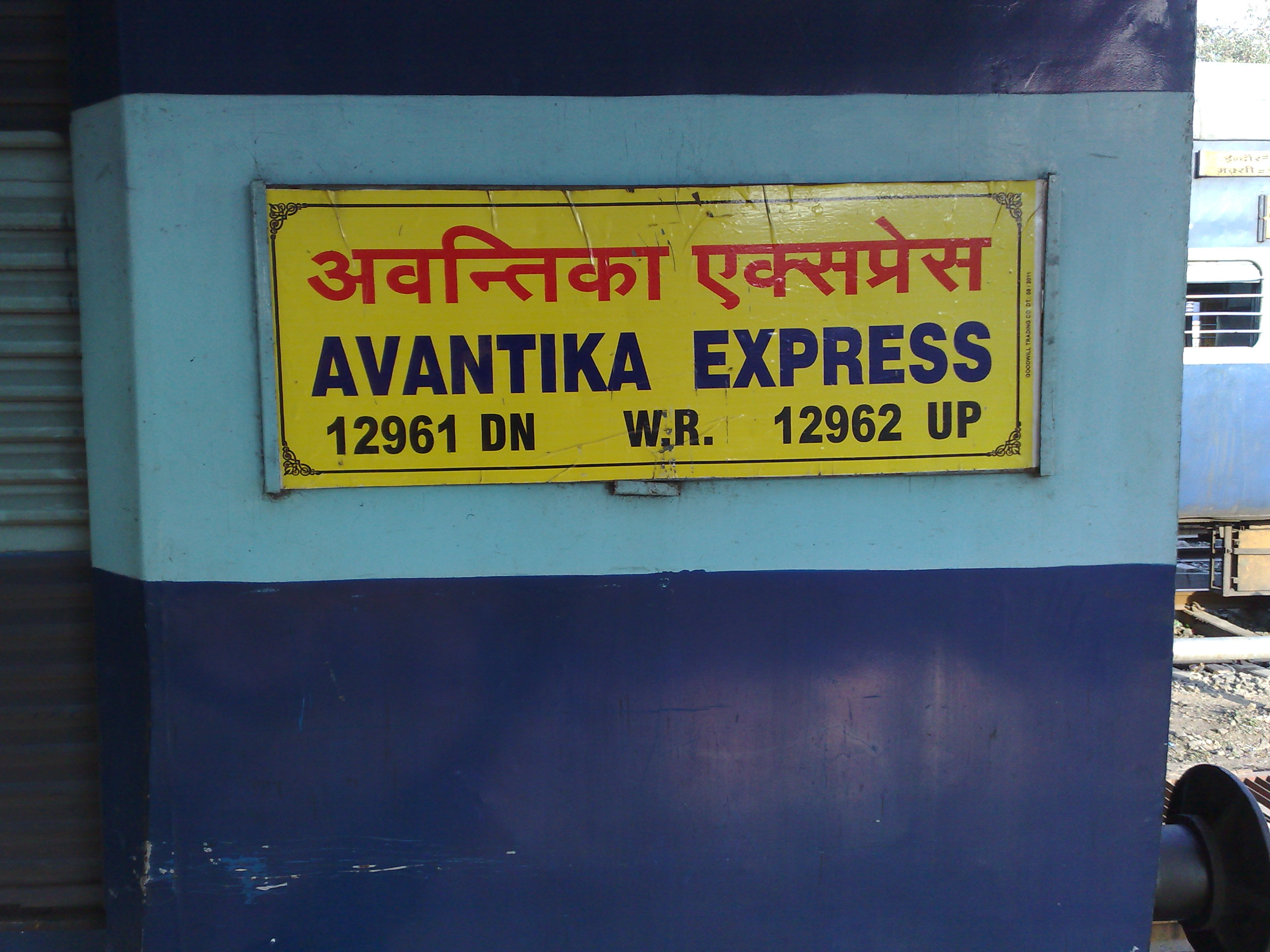
Former nameplate of ICF rakes

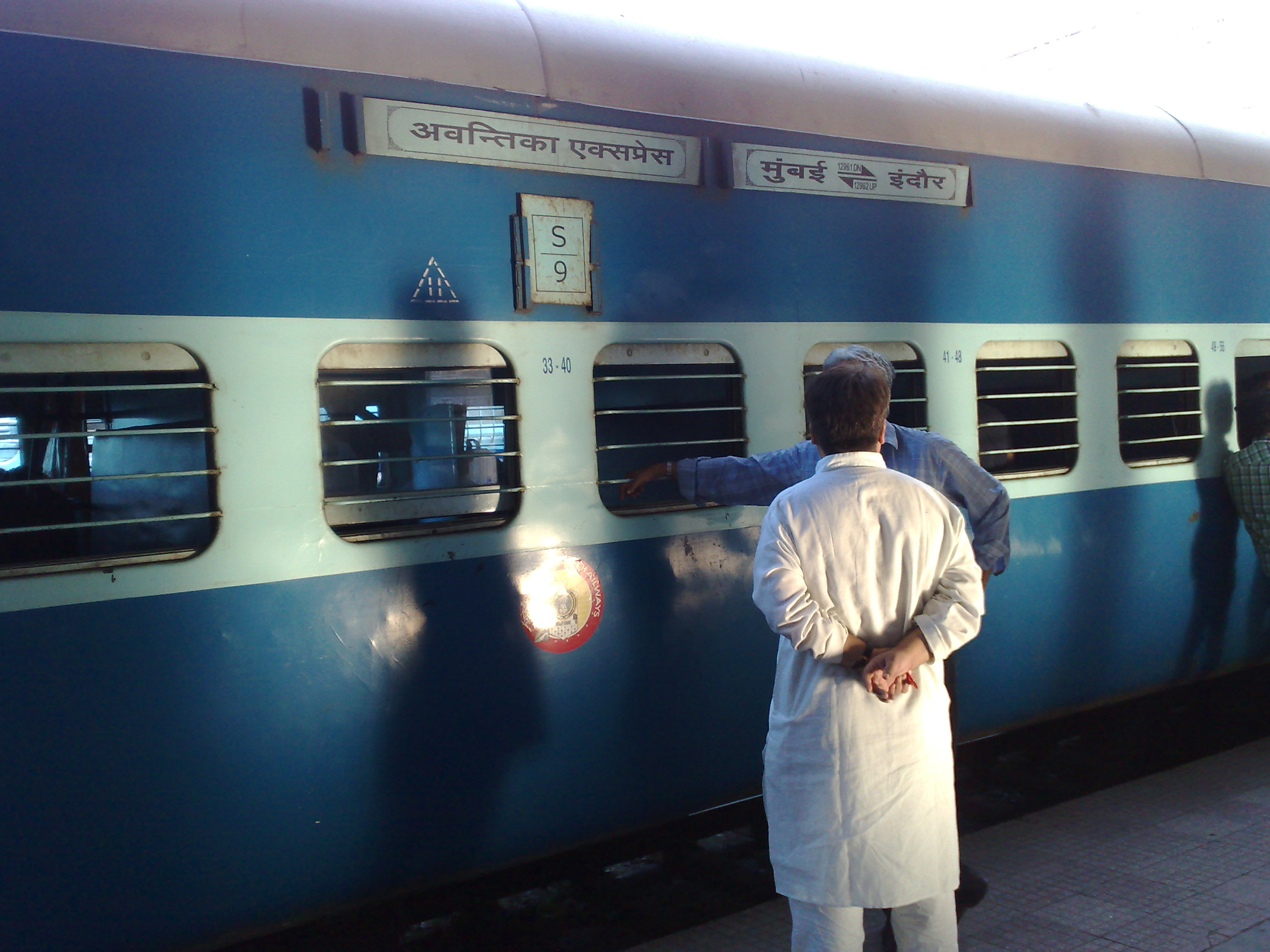
Former Sleeper Coach in ICF rakes

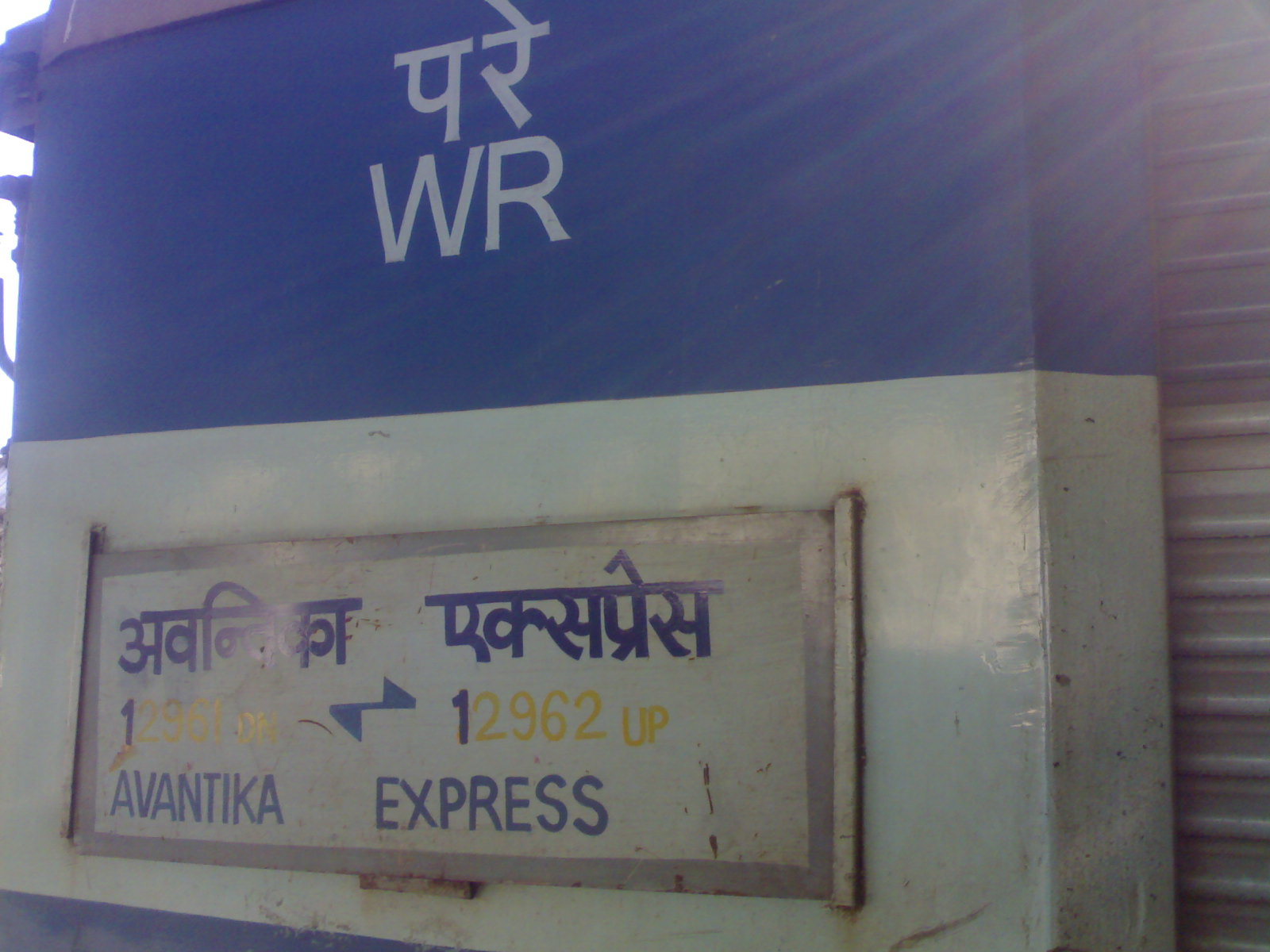
Former nameplate of ICF rakes (notice the first digit [1] added later on in different colour as the trains in IR earlier followed 4 digit numbering system)

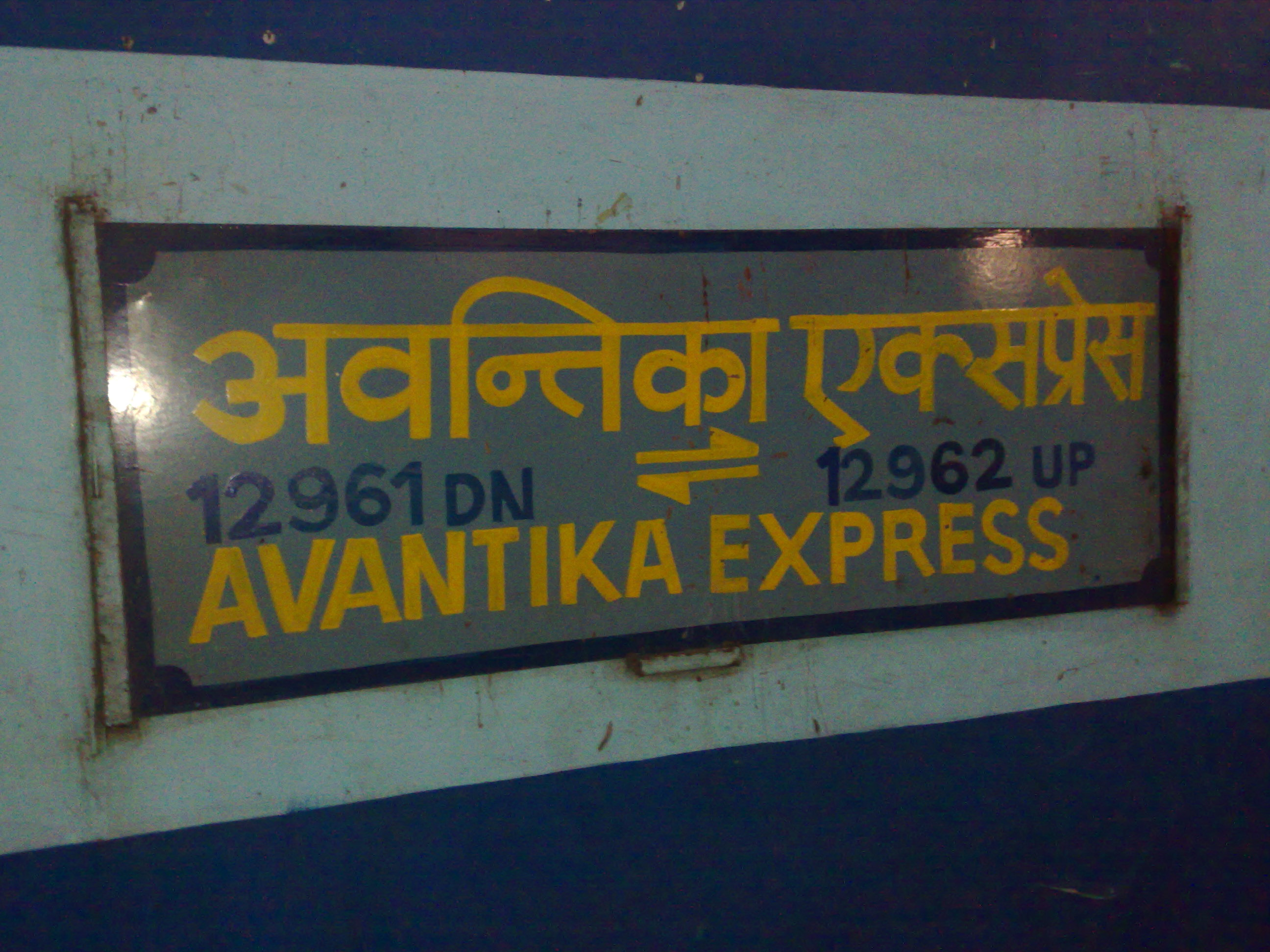
Former nameplate for ICF rakes (notice the first digit [1] added later on as the trains in IR earlier followed 4 digit numbering system)

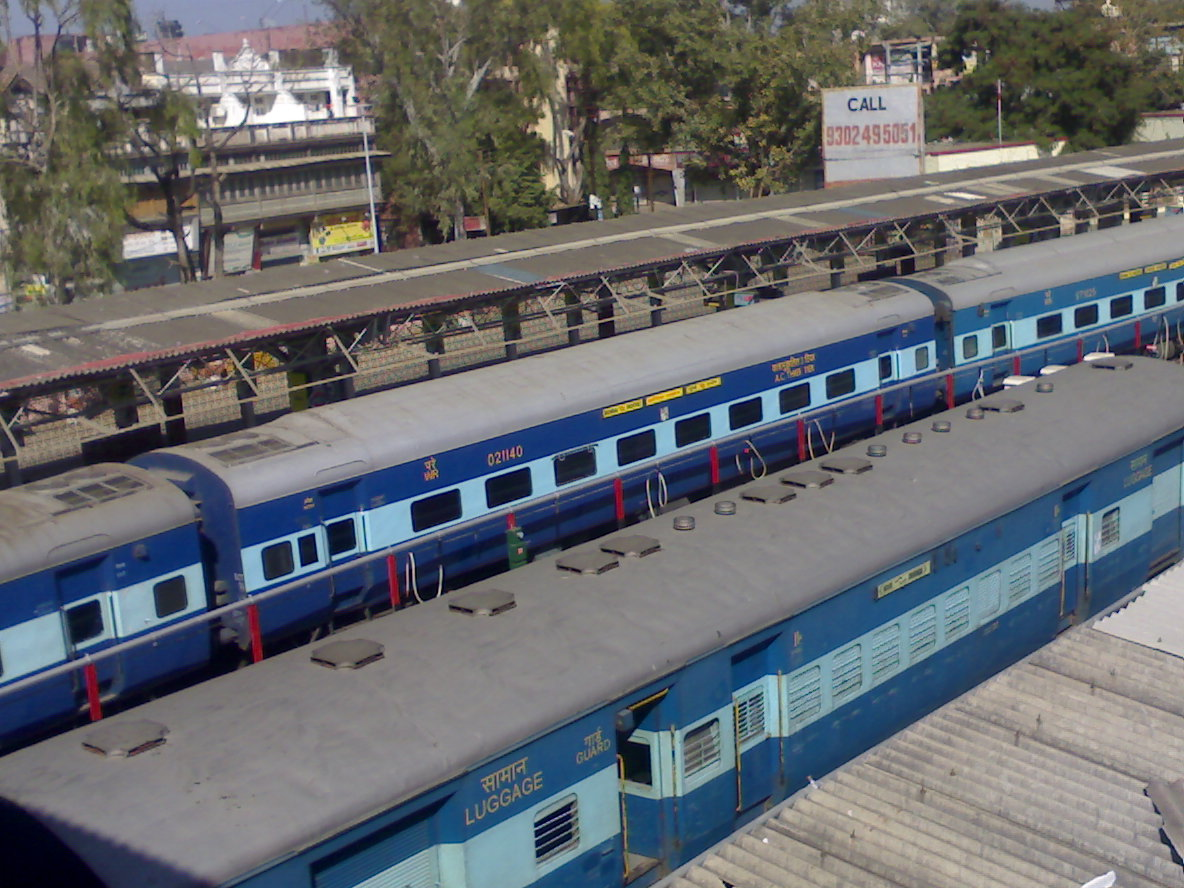
Former ICF rakes being sheltered at Indore

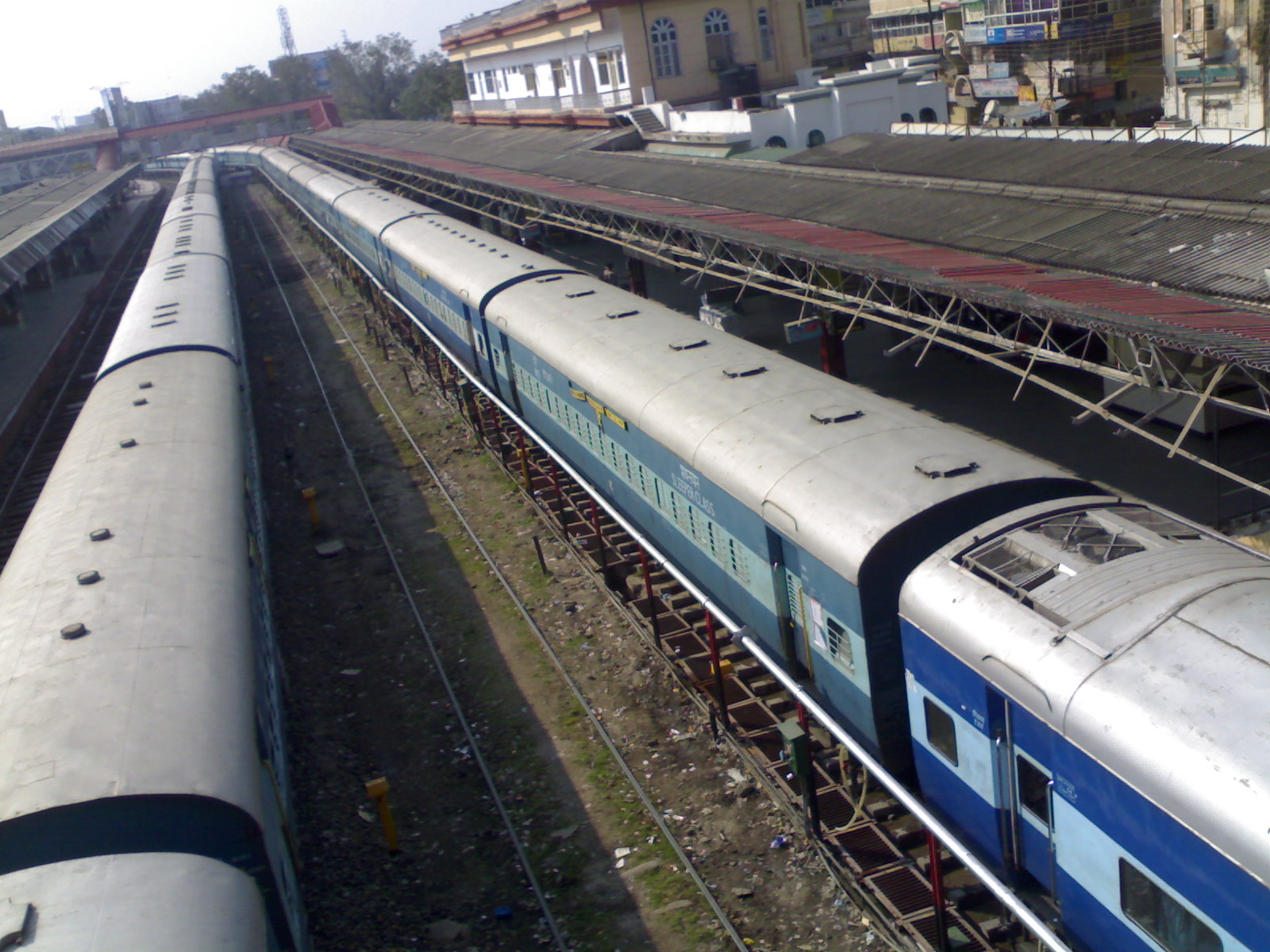
Former ICF rakes being backed into INDB station

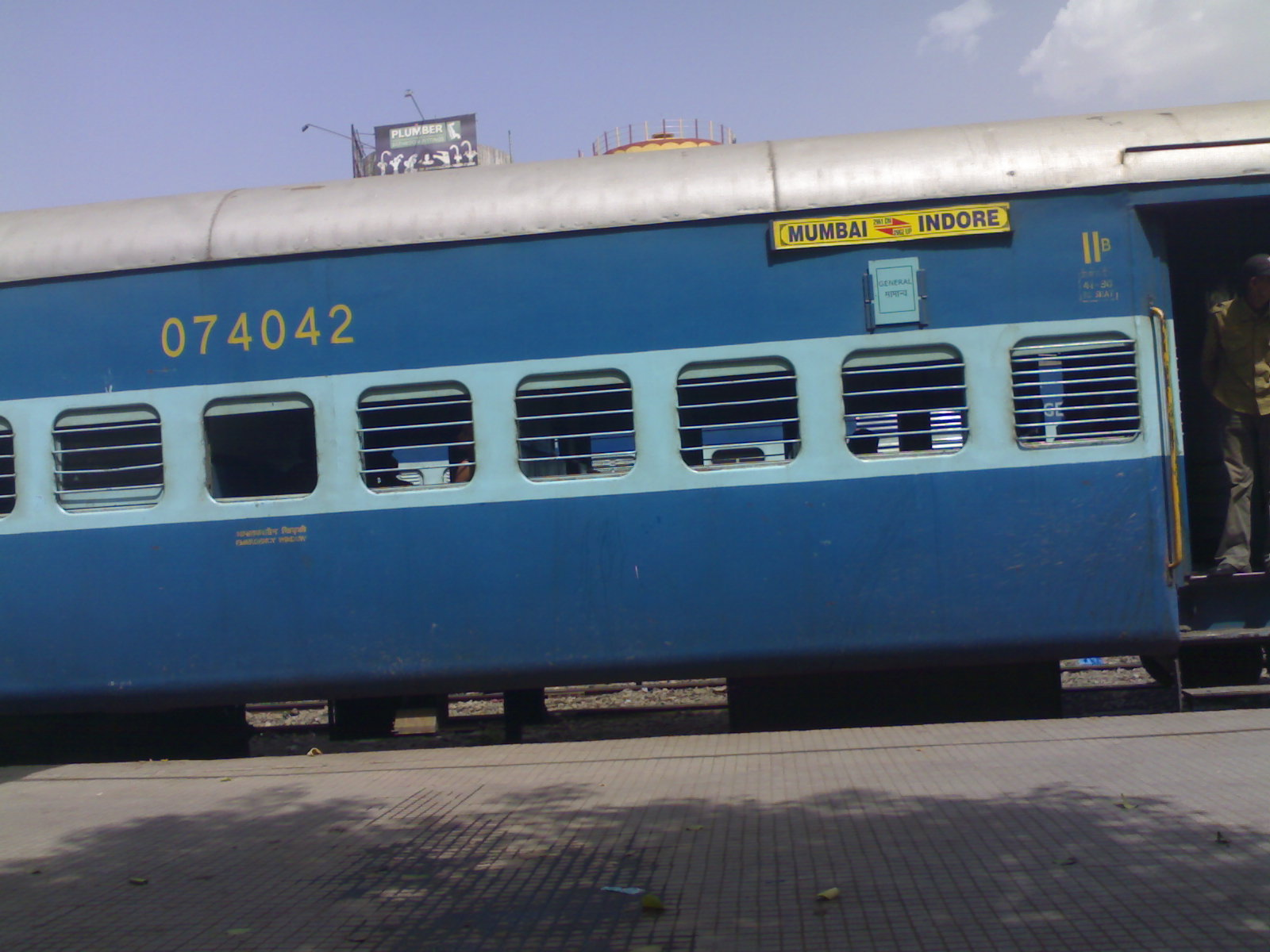
General Unreserved coach of former ICF rakes

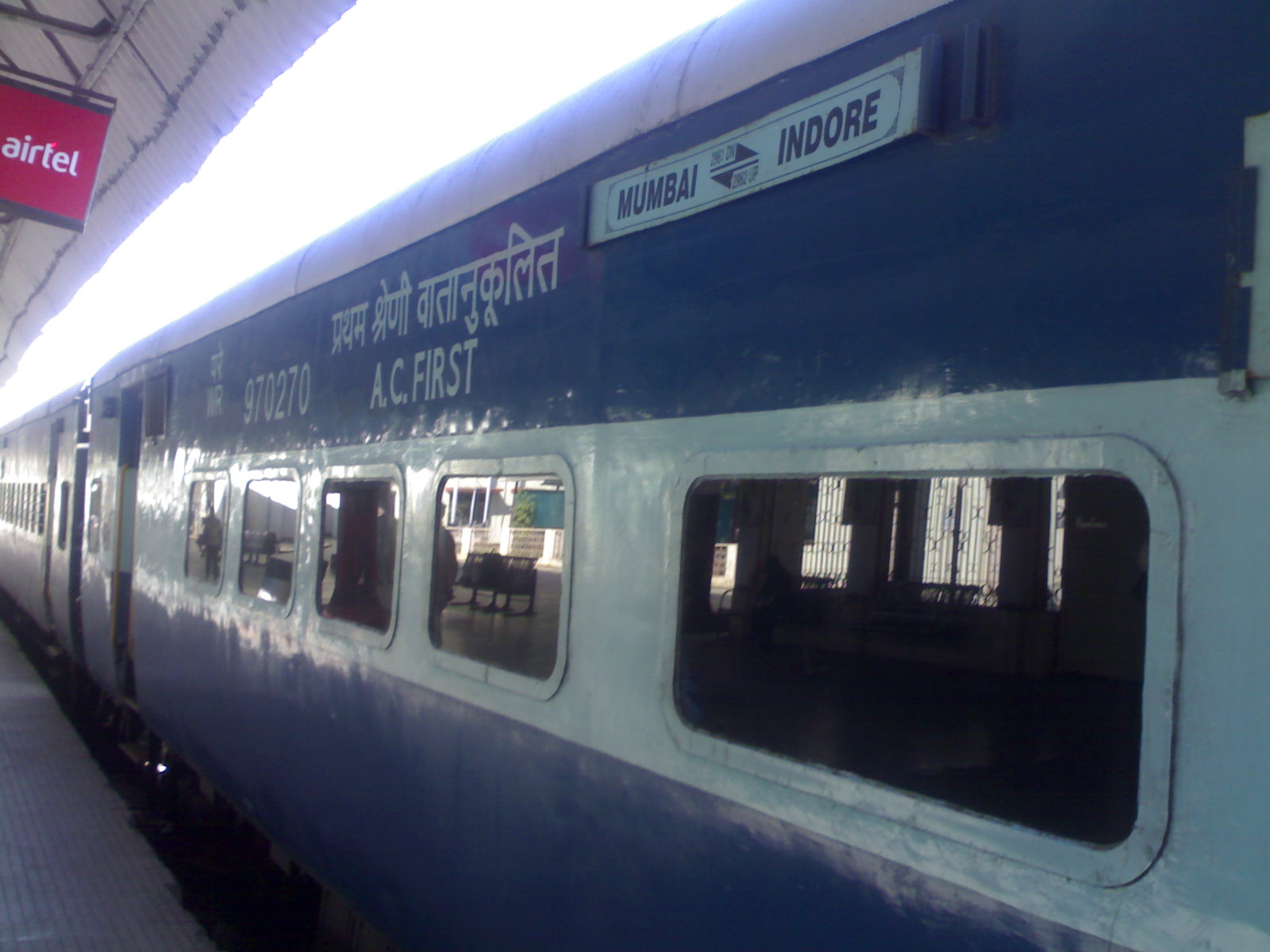
AC First Class coach of former ICF rakes

== Locomotive link ==
When Avantika Superfast was first introduced it was hauled by WDM-2 for the whole journey.

After some time, WCAM-1 became its regular link from Mumbai Central till Ujjain, After Ujjain WDM-2 hauled it complete its journey to Indore.

When Mumbai's WR was converted into AC current, WAP-4 took incharge of Avantika till Ujjain. After sometime Ujjain–Indore line got electrified and WAP-4 hauled it for whole journey.

After some years, Avantika SuperFast got India's fastest locomotive WAP-5 for its regular link.

When Avantika SuperFast got upgraded into LHB coach in 2019 February, its regular link also got upgraded into WAP-7 (usually HOG mode).

- All the diesel locomotives were provided by Ratlam Loco Shed (RTM)
- All the DC-traction electric locomotives were provided by Valsad Loco Shed (BL)
- All the AC-traction electric locomotives are provided by Vadodara Loco Shed (BRC)
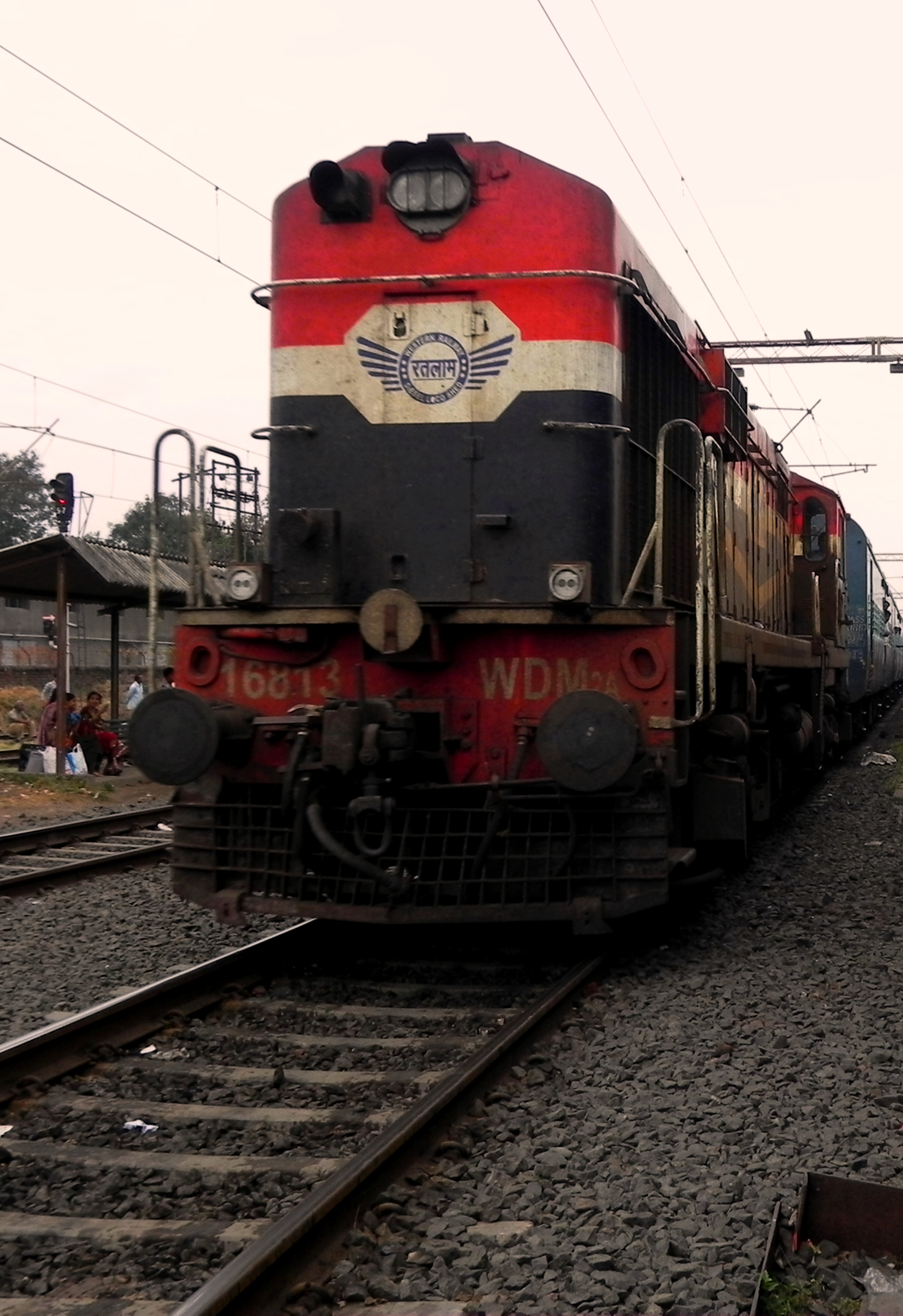
WDM2A

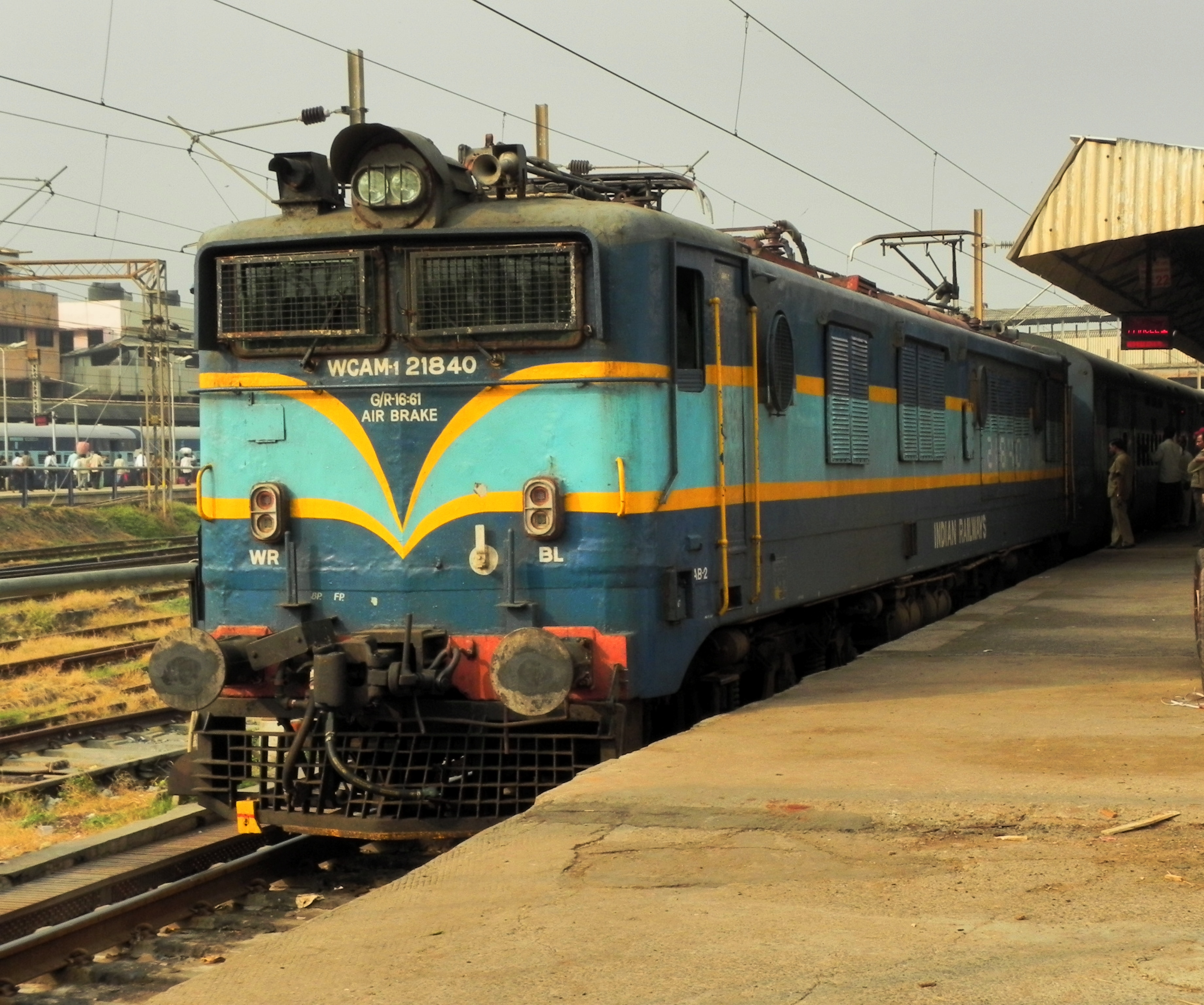
WCAM1

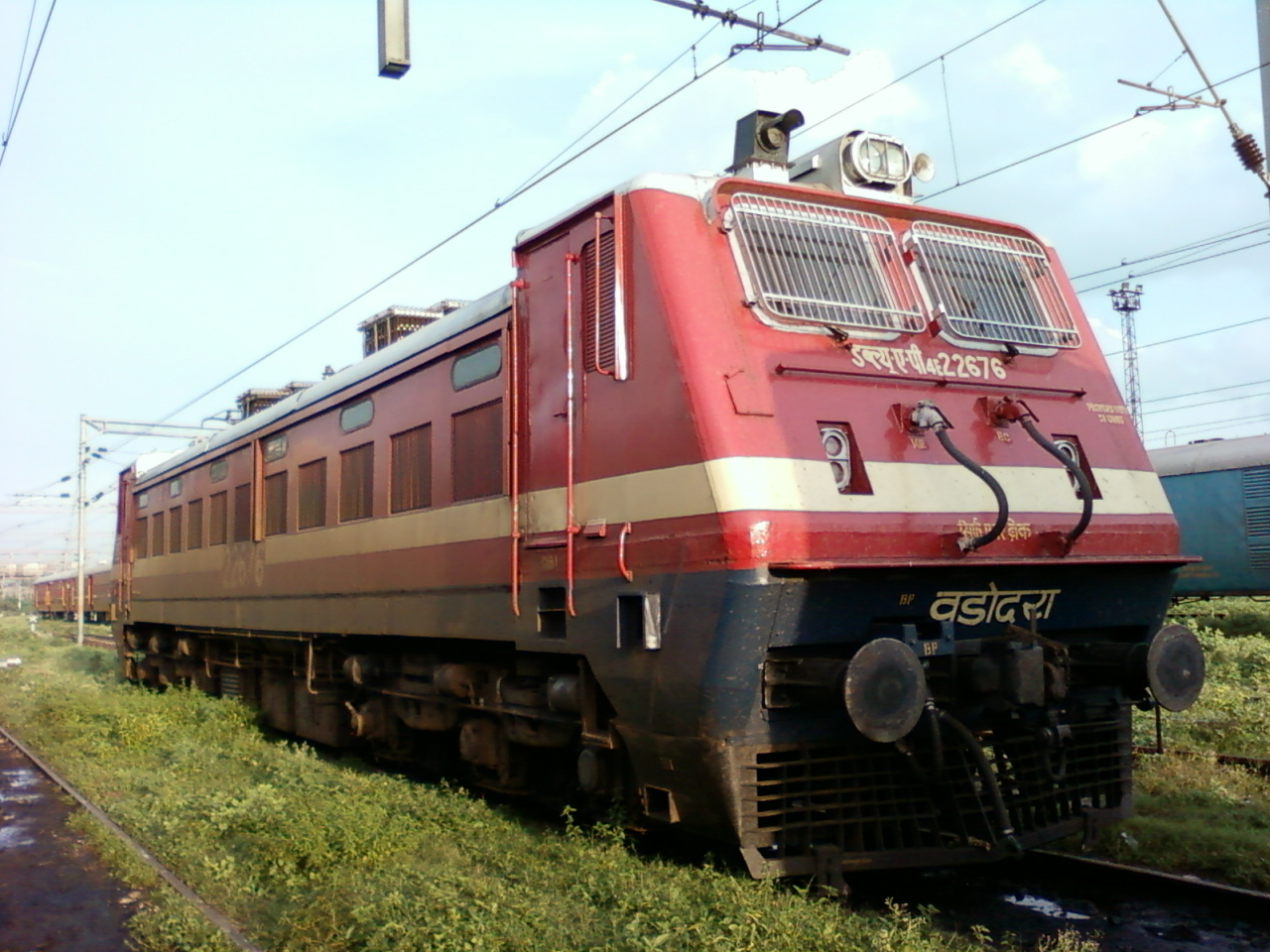
WAP4e

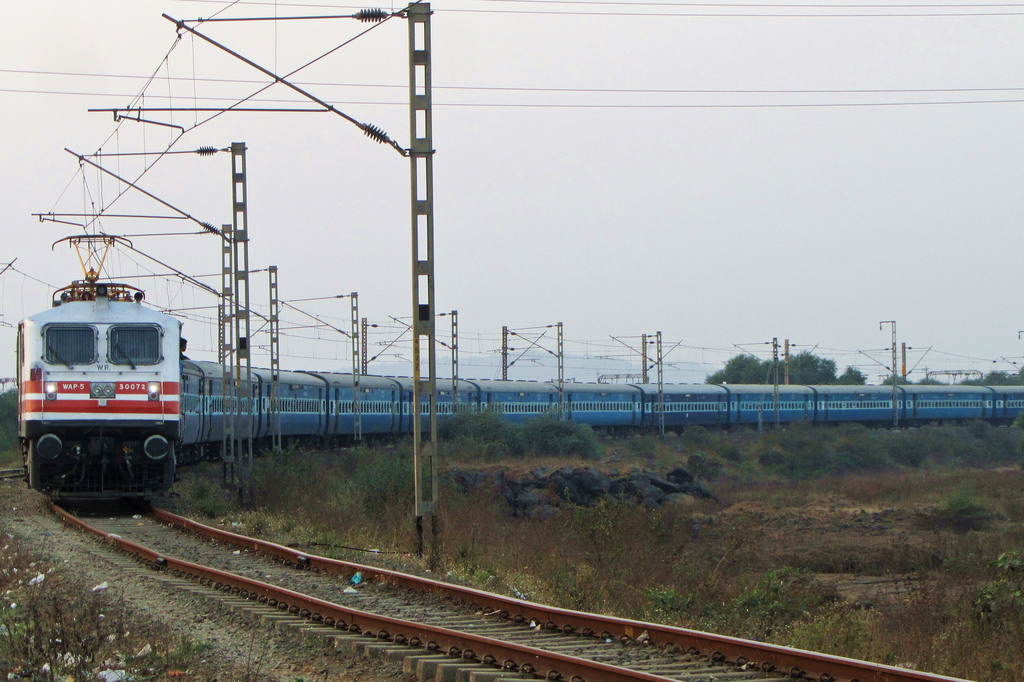
WAP5

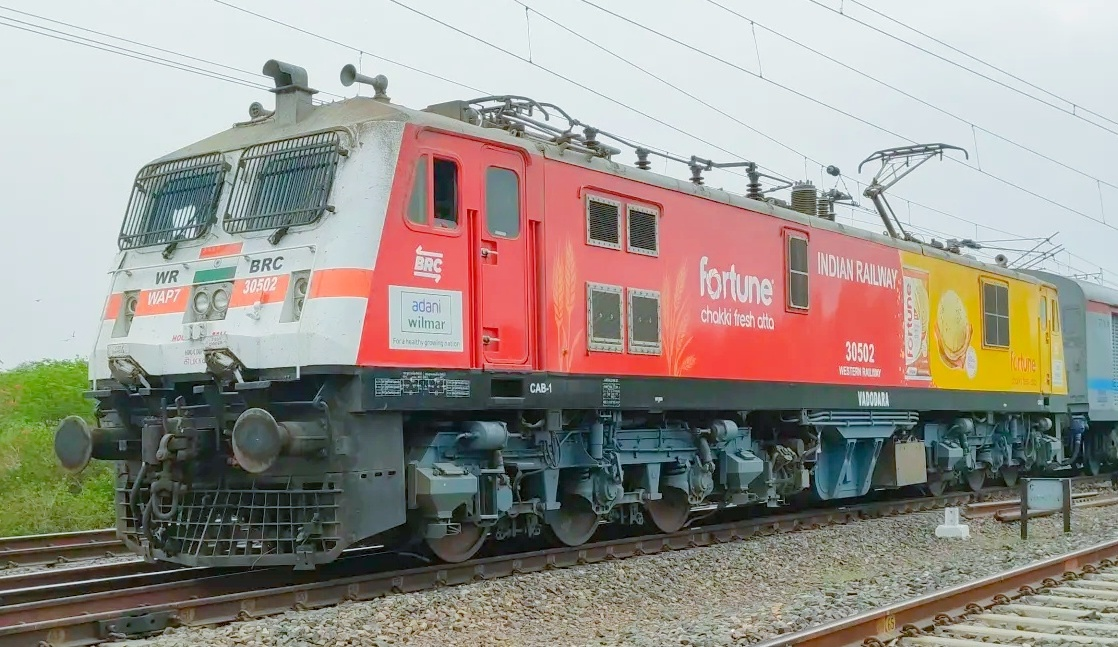
WAP7
