= Meghnagar =

- Town
- Location in Madhya Pradesh, India Meghnagar (India)
- Coordinates: 22°54′14″N 74°32′36″E
- Country: India
- State: Madhya Pradesh
- District: Jhabua

Population (2001)
  - Total: 10,316

Languages
  - Official: Hindi
- Time zone: UTC+5:30 (IST)
- ISO 3166 code: IN-MP
- Vehicle registration: MP 45

Meghnagar is a City Council and a Tehsil Headquarter in Jhabua district in the India state of Madhya Pradesh.

== Demographics ==
As of 2011 India census, Meghnagar had a population of 12,929. Males constitute 52% of the population and females 48%. Meghnagar has an average literacy rate of 62%, higher than the national average of 59.5%: male literacy is 69%, and female literacy is 54%. In Meghnagar, 18% of the population is under 6 years of age.

== Administration ==
Meghnagar Nagar Panchayat has total administration over 2,553 houses to which it supplies basic amenities like water and sewerage. It is also authorize to build roads within Nagar Panchayat limits and impose taxes on properties coming under its jurisdiction.

== Transportation ==
Meghnagar railway station falls in Western Railway zone and has stoppages of many important trains.
