= Swaraj Express =

Train in India

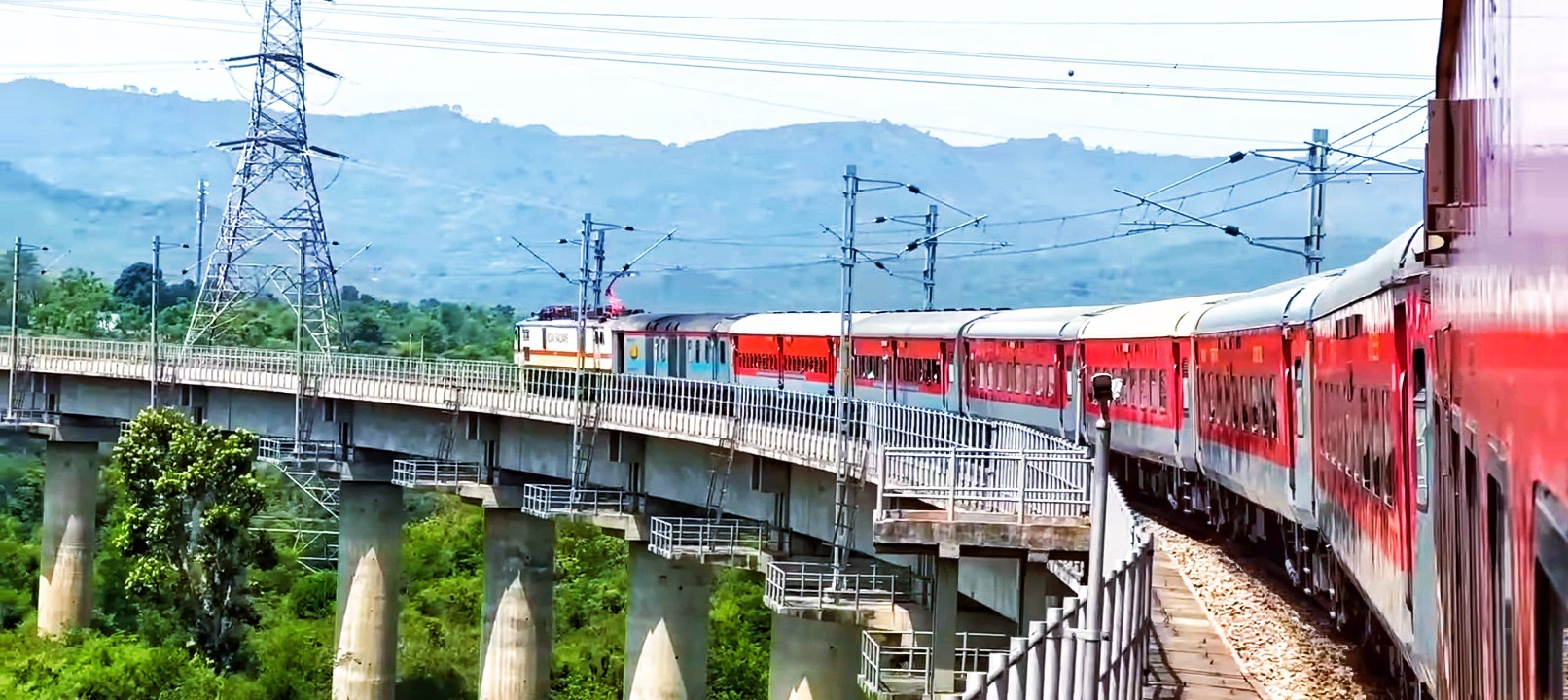
- Swaraj Express at Tawi river At Jammu

Overview
- Service type: Superfast Express
- Locale: Maharashtra, Gujarat, Madhya Pradesh, Rajasthan, Delhi, Haryana, Punjab & Jammu and Kashmir
- First service: 24 December 1976; 49 years ago(initial service); 1 September 2015; 10 years ago(extended upto SMVD Katra)
- Current operator: Northern Railway

Route
- Termini: Bandra Terminus (BDTS); SMVD Katra (SVDK)
- Stops: 25
- Distance travelled: 2,028 km (1,260 mi)
- Average journey time: 29 hours
- Service frequency: 4 days a week
- Train number: 12471 / 12472

On-board services
- Classes: AC 2 Tier, AC 3 Tier, Sleeper Class, General Unreserved, AC First Class
- Seating arrangements: Yes
- Sleeping arrangements: Yes
- Catering facilities: Available
- Observation facilities: Large windows
- Baggage facilities: Available
- Other facilities: Below the seats

Technical
- Rolling stock: LHB coach
- Track gauge: 1,676 mm (5 ft 6 in); Broad Gauge
- Operating speed: 68 km/h (42 mph) average including halts.
Route map
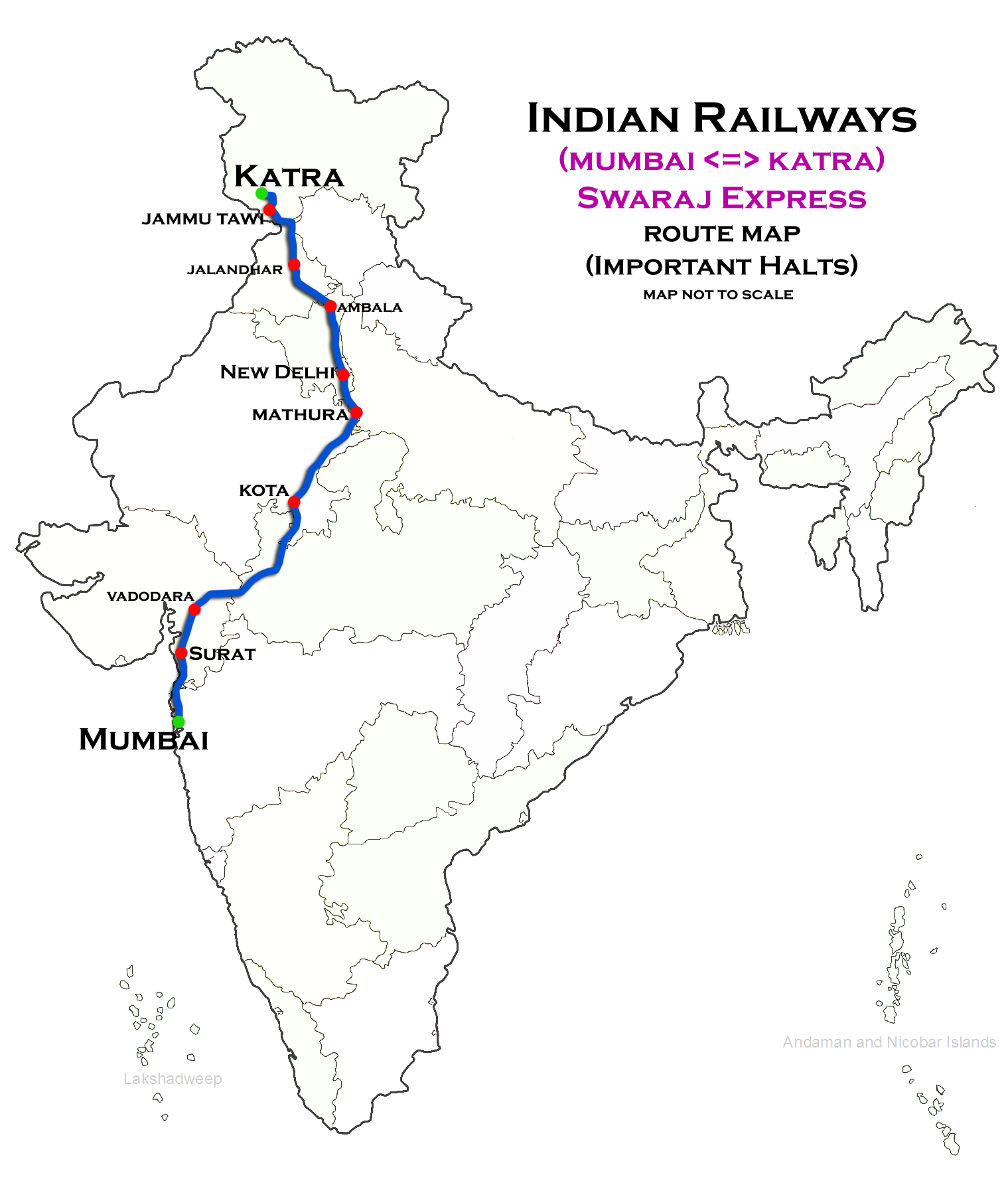

The 12471 / 12472 Swaraj Express is a superfast express train belonging to Northern Railway zone that runs between Bandra Terminus and Shri Mata Vaishno Devi Katra in India. It gets a very high priority on its route. It is the one and only train from Mumbai which directly connects Katra in Jammu & Kashmir.

It operates as train number 12471 from Bandra Terminus to Shri Mata Vaishno Devi Katra and as train number 12472 in the reverse direction.

It would initially run from Mumbai Central. Later it was transferred to Bandra Terminus.

== Coaches ==
The train has standard LHB rakes with a maximum speed of 130 km/h between Virar and Block Hut 01. The train consists of 21 coaches:

- 1 AC I
- 2 AC II Tier
- 4 AC III Tier
- 2 Economy AC Tier
- 6 Sleeper coaches
- 1 Pantry car
- 4 General Unreserved
- 2 End-on generator

As with most train services in India, coach composition may be amended at the discretion of Indian Railways depending on demand.

== Service ==
12471 Bandra Terminus–Shri Mata Vaishno Devi Katra Swaraj Express covers the distance of 2030 kilometres in 33 hours 15 mins (63.41 km/h) and 2030 kilometres in 32 hours 55 mins (63.24 km/h) as 12472 Shri Mata Vaishno Devi Katra–Bandra Terminus Swaraj Express.

As the average speed of the train is above 55 km/h, as per Indian Railways rules, its fare includes a Superfast surcharge.

== Route and halts ==
- Bandra Terminus
- Borivali
- Palghar
- Vapi
- Surat
- Bharuch Junction
- Vadodara Junction
- Godhra Junction
- Dahod
- Ratlam Junction
- Nagda Junction
- Sawai Madhopur
- Gangapur City
- Mathura Junction
- Hazrat Nizamuddin
- New Delhi
- Panipat Junction
- Ambala Cantonment
- Ludhiana Junction
- Jalandhar Cantonment Junction
- Kathua
- Jammu Tawi
- MCTM Udhampur
- Shri Mata Vaishno Devi Katra

== Coach positioning ==
LOCO-GS-GS-S6-S5-S4-S3-S2-S1-PC-M2-M1-B4-B3-B2-B1-A2-A1-H1-GS-GS-EOG

== Rake sharing ==
This train shares its rake with,

- 12473/12474 Gandhidham–Shri Mata Vaishno Devi Katra Sarvodaya Express
- 12475/12476 Hapa–Shri Mata Vaishno Devi Katra Sarvodaya Express
- 12477/12478 Jamnagar–Shri Mata Vaishno Devi Katra Express

== Traction ==
It is hauled by a Itarsi Loco Shed based WAP-7 electric locomotive from end to end.
