= Meghnagar railway station =

Railway station in Madhya Pradesh, India

Meghnagar

General information
- Location: Meghnagar, Jhabua, Madhya Pradesh; India
- Coordinates: 22°54′27″N 74°32′23″E
- Elevation: 321 metres (1,053 ft)
- System: Indian Railways station
- Owner: Indian Railways
- Operator: Western Railway
- Lines: New Delhi–Mumbai main line Mathura–Vadodara section
- Platforms: 3
- Tracks: 4
- Connections: Auto stand

Construction
- Structure type: Standard (on-ground station)
- Parking: No
- Cycle facilities: No

Other information
- Status: Functioning
- Station code: MGN
- Zone(s): Western Railway
- Division(s): Ratlam
Location
- Location within India Location within Madhya Pradesh

Meghnagar railway station is a small railway station in Jhabua district, Madhya Pradesh. Its code is MGN. It serves Meghnagar city. The station consists of three platforms. The platforms are not well sheltered. It lacks many facilities including water and sanitation.

The railway station of Meghnagar is located on New Delhi–Mumbai main line. Meghnagar is well connected to Bhopal, Ujjain, Gwalior, Jaipur, Jabalpur, Katni, Ratlam and Bina within the state and almost every other state of India. The station is a border station between Gujarat & Madhya Pradesh and railhead for Jhabua town. Meghnagar is situated 81 km from Ratlam and 33 km from Dahod on Mathura–Vadodara section of Western Railway.

== Major trains ==
The following trains halt at Meghnagar railway station in both directions :

- Avantika Express
- Paschim Express
- Sabarmati Express
- Gandhidham–Shri Mata Vaishno Devi Katra Sarvodaya Express
- Shanti Express
- Swaraj Express
- Golden Temple Mail
- Firozpur Janata Express
- Jaipur–Bandra Terminus Superfast Express
- Jaipur Superfast Express
- Indore–Pune Superfast Express
- Somnath–Jabalpur Express (via Itarsi)
- Somnath–Jabalpur Express (via Bina)
- Jamnagar–Shri Mata Vaishno Devi Katra Express
- Habibganj–Dahod Fast Passenger
- Bandra Terminus–Dehradun Express
