= Chinchwad railway station =

Railway station in India

Chinchwad चिंचवड
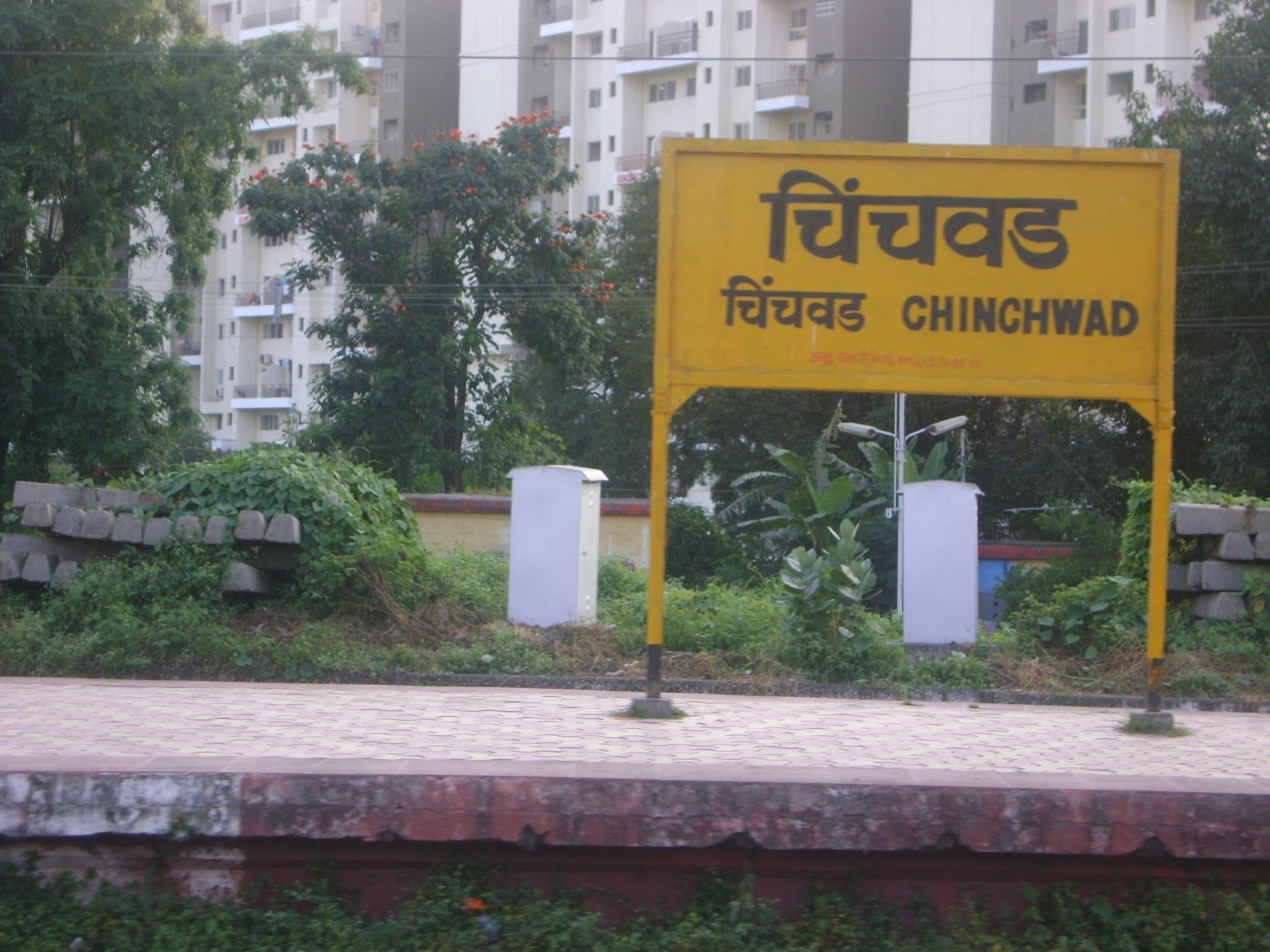

General information
- Location: Chinchwad, Pimpri-Chinchwad
- Coordinates: 18.6397°N 73.7918°E
- System: Pune Suburban Railway station
- Owner: Indian Railways
- Lines: Pune Suburban Railway; Mumbai Dadar–Solapur section
- Platforms: 4
- Tracks: 6

Construction
- Parking: Yes

Other information
- Status: Active
- Station code: CCH
- Fare zone: Central Railway

Services
Preceding station	Pune Suburban Railway	Following station
Akurdi towards Lonavala	Lonavala Line	Pimpri towards Pune Junction
Location
- Interactive map

Chinchwad railway station is an important halt on the Pune Suburban Railway. It connects to the historic centre of Pune and is one of the oldest local railway station. It is located 2.1 km from Chinchwad Bus Terminal, Pune Junction is 18 km away. Few trains travelling from Mumbai to Pune or Kolhapur have their halt on this station. The nearest airport is Pune International Airport which is 15 km away. This is operated by Central Railway division of Indian Railways. This station has four platforms and one footbridge.

== Express & Passenger ==
Trains halting at Chinchwad railway station are:-

- Mumbai–Kolhapur Koyna Express
- Panvel–Hazur Sahib Nanded Express
- Pune–Mumbai Sinhagad Express
- Pune–Panvel Passenger
- Mumbai–Bijapur Passenger
- Mumbai–Shirdi Passenger
- Mumbai–Pandharpur Passenger
- Pune–Bhusaval Express
- Indore–Pune Superfast Express
- Indore–Pune Express (via Panvel)
- Pune–Valsad Express
- Pune–Ernakulam (Holiday Special) Humsafar Express
- Pune–Gwalior Weekly Express

== Suburban trains ==
Local or Suburban trains travelling on the Pune Junction–Lonavala–Pune Junction or Pune Junction–Talegaon–Pune Junction routes halt at this station.

=== Lonavala / Talegaon Locals ===
Destination	Train name	Timmings	Frequency
(To) Lonavala	Lonavala Local	00.42, 04.52,06.12, 06.57, 08.27, 10.32, 11.27, 12.27, 13.27, 16.07, 16.57, 18.07, 18.42, 19.27, 20.27, 21.37 and 22.37.	Daily
(To) Talegaon	Talegaon Local	07.22, 09.27 and 15.27.	Daily

=== Pune Locals ===
Destination	Train name	Timmings	Frequency
(From) Lonavala	Lonavala Local	05.53, 07.08, 08.13, 09.08, 11.08, 12.43, 14.53, 15.49, 16.38, 18.13, 19.13, 20.28, 21.33, 22.38, 23.03, 00.08 and 00.38	Daily
(From) Talegaon	Talegaon Local	08.26, 10.21 and 16.21.	Daily
