= Khachrod railway station =

Railway station in Madhya Pradesh, India

Khachrod

General information
- Location: Khachrod, Ujjain district, Madhya Pradesh; India
- Coordinates: 23°26′33″N 75°17′11″E
- Elevation: 498 metres (1,634 ft)
- System: Indian Railways station
- Owner: Indian Railways
- Operator: Western Railway
- Line: New Delhi–Mumbai main line
- Platforms: 2
- Tracks: 4

Construction
- Structure type: Standard
- Parking: Yes

Other information
- Status: Functioning
- Station code: KUH
- Zone(s): Western Railway
- Division(s): Ratlam
Location
- Location within India Location within Madhya Pradesh

Khachrod railway station is a railway station of Ratlam division, Western Railways situated on the very middle of Mumbai–Delhi main line. Its code is KUH. It serves Khachrod city. The station consists of two platforms. Passenger, MEMU, Express, and Superfast trains have the stoppages at Khachrod.

== Major trains ==
The following trains halt at Khachrod railway station in both up and down directions:

Superfast and Mail/Express trains:

- 11463/64 Somnath–Jabalpur Express (via Itarsi)
- 11465/66 Somnath–Jabalpur Express (via Bina)
- 19309/10 Shanti Express
- 19165/66 Ahmedabad–Darbhanga Sabarmati Express
- 19167/68 Sabarmati Express
- 19329/30 Veer Bhumi Chittaurgarh Express
- 19023/24 Firozpur Janata Express
- 22943/44 Indore–Pune Express
- 12961/62 Avantika Express
- 19311/12 Indore–Pune Express
- 19711/12 Bhopal–Jaipur Express
- 59307/19711-Slip Bhopal–Jaipur Express
- 19019/20 Dehradun Express

Passenger trains:

- 69184/83 Dahod–Ujjain MEMU Passenger
- 69155/56 Ratlam–Mathura MEMU Passenger
- 59802/03 Jaipur/Kota–Ratlam Fast Passenger
- 59317/18 Bina–Ratlam Fast Passenger
- 59393/94 Bhopal–Dahod DEMU Fast Passenger
- 59831/32 Kota Junction–Vadodara Junction
