= Gandhidham–Shri Mata Vaishno Devi Katra Sarvodaya Express =

Train in India

Gandhidham-Shri Mata Vaishno Devi Katra Sarvodaya Express

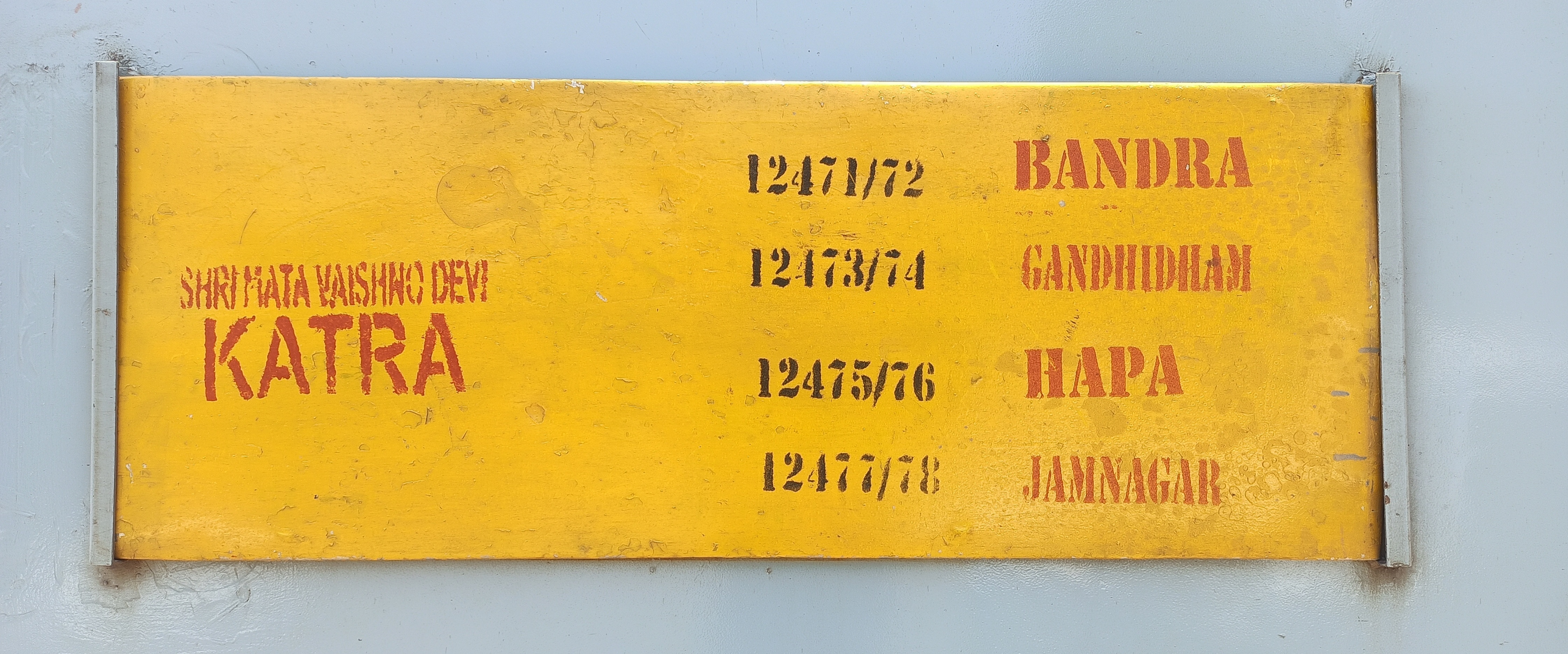
- Gandhidham - SVDK Express train board

Overview
- Service type: Express
- First service: 3 September 2015; 10 years ago(extended to Shri Mata Vaishno Devi Katra)
- Current operator: Northern Railway

Route
- Termini: Gandhidham (GIMB); SMVD Katra (SDVK)
- Stops: 28
- Distance travelled: 2,047 km (1,272 mi)
- Average journey time: 35 hours 30 minutes
- Service frequency: Weekly. (Note: Runs one day in a week for every direction.)
- Train number: 12473 / 12474

On-board services
- Classes: AC 2 tier, AC 3 tier, Sleeper Class, General Unreserved
- Seating arrangements: Yes
- Sleeping arrangements: Yes
- Catering facilities: Available
- Observation facilities: Large windows
- Baggage facilities: Available
- Other facilities: Below the seats

Technical
- Rolling stock: LHB coach
- Track gauge: 1,676 mm (5 ft 6 in)
- Operating speed: 59 km/h (37 mph) average including halts.

The 12473 / 12474 Gandhidham-Shri Mata Vaishno Devi Katra Sarvodaya Express is an express train of the Indian Railways connecting Gandhidham Junction in Gujarat and Shri Mata Vaishno Devi Katra of Jammu and Kashmir. It is currently being operated with 12473/12474 train numbers on a weekly basis.

== Service ==
12473/Sarvodaya Express has an average speed of 57 km/h and covers 2047 km in 36 hrs 00 mins.

12474/Sarvodaya Express has an average speed of 58 km/h and covers 2047 km in 35 hrs 00 mins.

== Route and halts ==
Station code	Station name	Arrival	Departure
GIMB	Gandhidham Junction	---	09:00
SIOB	Samakhiala Junction	10:00	10:02
VG	Viramgam Junction	12:50	12:52
ADI	Ahmedabad Junction	14:10	14:30
ND	Nadiad Junction	15:09	15:11
ANND	Anand Junction	15:25	15:27
CYI	Chhayapuri	16:02	16:07
GDA	Godhra Junction	17:02	17:04
DHD	Dahod	17:52	17:54
MGN	Meghnagar	18:18	18:20
RTM	Ratlam Junction	19:40	19:50
NAD	Nagda Junction	20:46	20:48
VMA	Vikramgarh Alot	21:12	21:14
SGZ	Shamgarh	21:44	21:46
RMA	Ramganj Mandi Junction	22:20	22:22
KOTA	Kota Junction	23:20	23:30
SWN	Sawai Madhopur Junction	00:33	00:35
MTJ	Mathura Junction	03:15	03:20
NZM	Hazrat Nizamuddin	05:05	05:07
NDLS	New Delhi	05:30	05:45
PNP	Panipat Junction	07:11	07:13
UMB	Ambala Cantt Junction	08:47	08:52
LDH	Ludhiana Junction	10:13	10:20
JRC	Jalandhar Cantt Junction	11:10	11:13
PTKC	Pathankot Cantt	12:53	12:56
KTHU	Kathua	13:25	13:27
JAT	Jammu Tawi	14:50	14:58
UHP	Udhampur	16:51	16:53
SVDK	Shri Mata Vaishno Devi Katra	17:40	---

== Coach composite ==
The train has standard LHB Rakes with max speed of 110 kmph. The train consists of 22 coaches:

- 1 AC I Tier
- 2 AC II Tier
- 6 AC III Tier
- 6 Sleeper Coaches
- 1 Pantry Car
- 4 General
- 2 Seating cum Luggage Rake

== Traction ==
Both trains are hauled by a Ghaziabad Loco Shed-based WAP-7 electric from Gandhidham to SMVD Katra and vice versa.

== Rake sharing ==
This train shares its rake with

- 12471/12472 Swaraj Express
- 12475/12476 Hapa - Shri Mata Vaishno Devi Katra Sarvodaya Express
- 12477/12478 Jamnagar - Shri Mata Vaishno Devi Katra Express

== See also ==
- Ahmedabad Junction railway station
- Shri Mata Vaishno Devi Katra railway station
