= Bamnia railway station =

Railway station in Madhya Pradesh, India

Bamnia
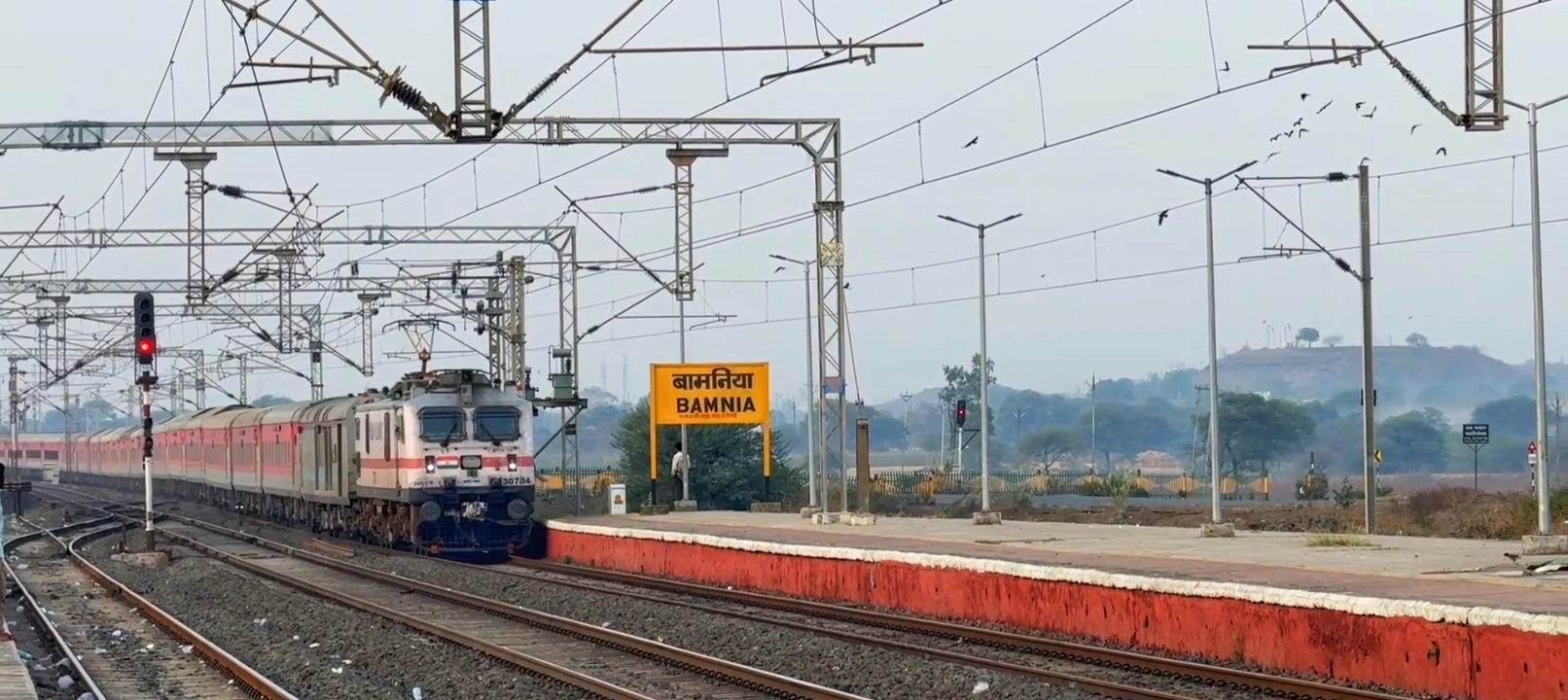
- Bamnia railway station

General information
- Location: Bamnia, Jhabua district, Madhya Pradesh; India
- Coordinates: 23°05′42″N 74°45′30″E
- Elevation: 395 metres (1,296 ft)
- System: Indian Railways station
- Owner: Indian Railways
- Operator: Western Railway
- Line: New Delhi–Mumbai main line
- Platforms: 3
- Tracks: 3

Construction
- Structure type: Standard (on ground)
- Parking: No
- Cycle facilities: No

Other information
- Status: Functioning
- Station code: BMI
- Zone(s): Western Railway
- Division(s): Ratlam
Location
- Location within India Location within Madhya Pradesh

Bamnia railway station is a small railway station in Jhabua district, Madhya Pradesh. Its code is BMI. It serves Bamnia village. The station consists of three platforms. It lacks many facilities including water and sanitation. Passenger, MEMU, Express, and Superfast trains halt here.

== Trains ==
The following trains halt at Bamnia railway station in both directions:

- 12961/62 Avantika Express

(Daily)

- 19037/38 Avadh Express

(Daily)

- 19339/40 Dahod-Bhopal Intercity (Daily)
- 12475/76 Hapa-Katra Express (Tuesday)
- 12477/78 Jamnagar-Katra Express

(12477-Wednesday,78-Monday)

- 12473/74 Sarvodaya Express

(12474-Friday,73-Saturday)

- 12471/72 Swaraj Express

(12471- Sunday, Monday, Thursday, Friday 12472-Sunday, Wednesday, Thursday, Saturday)

- 19819/20 Vadodara-Kota Express (Daily)
- 09381/82 Dahod-Ratlam MEMU

(Daily)

- 09357/58 Dahod-Ratlam MEMU

(Daily)
