= Martyr Captain Sunil Kumar Choudhary Kathua railway station =

Railway station in Jammu and Kashmir, India

Martyr Captain Sunil Kumar Choudhary Kathua

General information
- Location: Kathua, Jammu and Kashmir, 184102; India
- Coordinates: 32.3981°N 75.5507°E
- Elevation: 393 metres (1,289 ft)
- System: Indian Railways station
- Owner: Ministry of Railways
- Operator: Indian Railways
- Lines: Amritsar–Jammu main line; Jalandhar–Jammu line
- Platforms: 2
- Tracks: 6

Construction
- Structure type: Standard (on ground)
- Parking: Available
- Accessible: Yes

Other information
- Status: Functioning
- Station code: MSKT
- Zone(s): Northern Railways
- Division(s): Jammu

History
- Former names: North India Railway Company
Location
- Location within Jammu and Kashmir Location within India

Martyr Captain Sunil Kumar Choudhary Kathua Railway station, also known as Kathua railway station is a railway station in Kathua, Jammu and Kashmir.

== Electrification ==
The entire Jalandhar–Jammu section, Jammu Tawi station and sidings have been completely energised at 25 kV AC and approved for electric traction in August 2014. Swaraj Express now gets an end to end WAP-4 from Jammu Tawi to Bandra Terminus. Himgiri Express now gets an end to end WAP-7 from Jammu Tawi to Howrah.

== See also ==
- Jammu–Baramulla line
- Northern Railways
- List of railway stations in Jammu and Kashmir
