= Anand–Godhra section =

Railway section in India

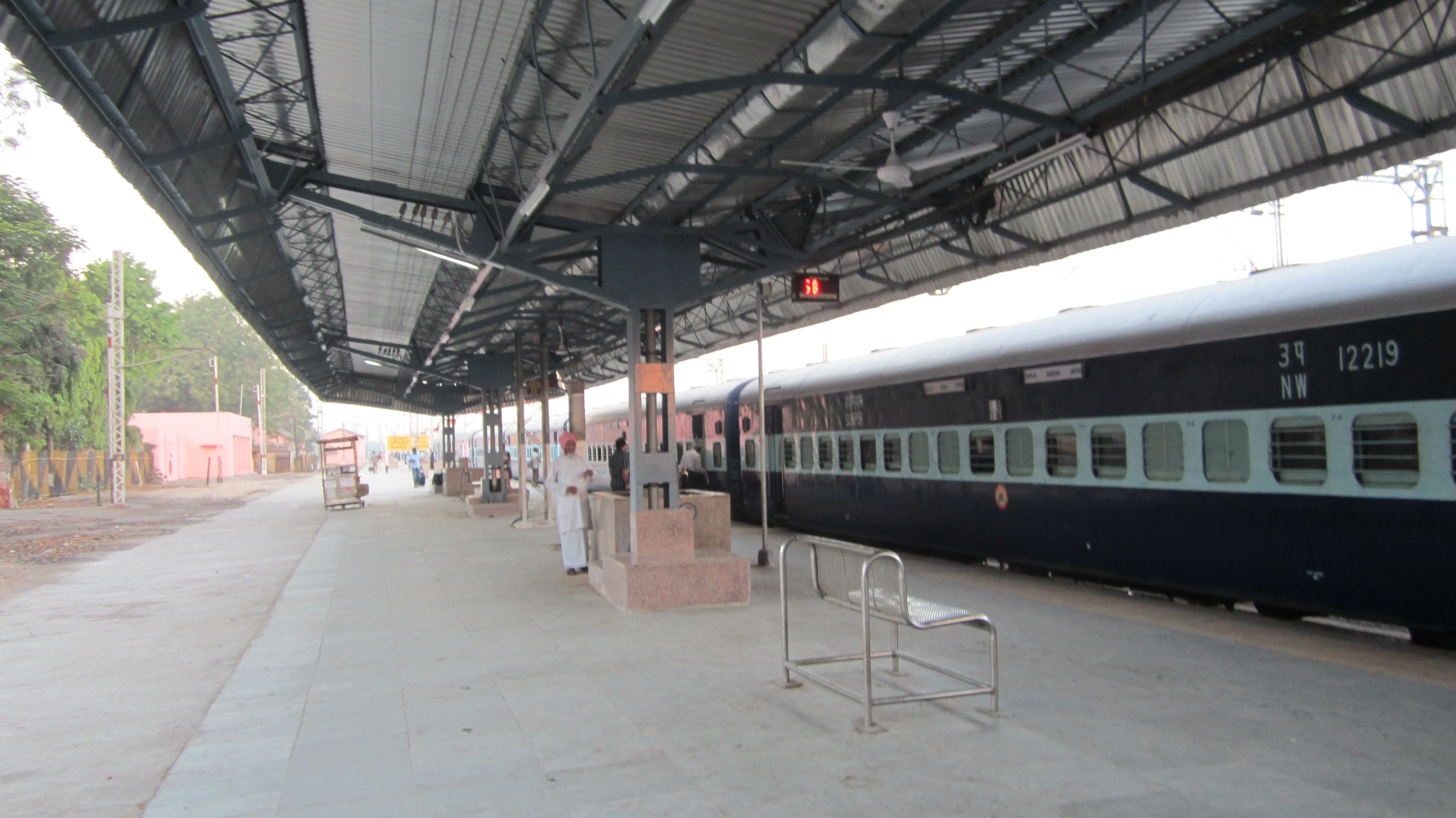
- Godhra Junction is an important railway station on Anand–Godhra section

Overview
- Status: Operational
- Owner: Indian Railways
- Locale: Gujarat
- Termini: Anand; Godhra
- Stations: 11

Service
- Operator: Western Railway

Technical
- Track length: 79 km (49 mi)
- Number of tracks: 1
- Track gauge: 5 ft 6 in (1,676 mm) broad gauge
- Electrification: Yes

The Anand–Godhra section belongs to Vadodara division of Western Railway zone in Gujarat State.

== History ==
Anand-Dakor branch was opened in 1874. The length of Anand-Dakor branch was 29 km. Dakor-Rukhyal and Rukhyal-Angadi branch was opened in 1875 and 1876 respectively. The total length of Dakor-Angadi branch was 15 km. 27 km Sevalia-Godhra branch was opened in 1882.

The branch of Anand-Thasra and Thasra-Godhra was electrified in 1983 and 1984 respectively.

== Doubling ==
Doubling of Anand–Godhra section was sanctioned in 2017-2018. Foundation stone of Anand–Godhra section was laid in 2019. The length of Anand–Godhra section is 79 km.
