= Godhra Junction railway station =

Railway Station in Gujarat, India

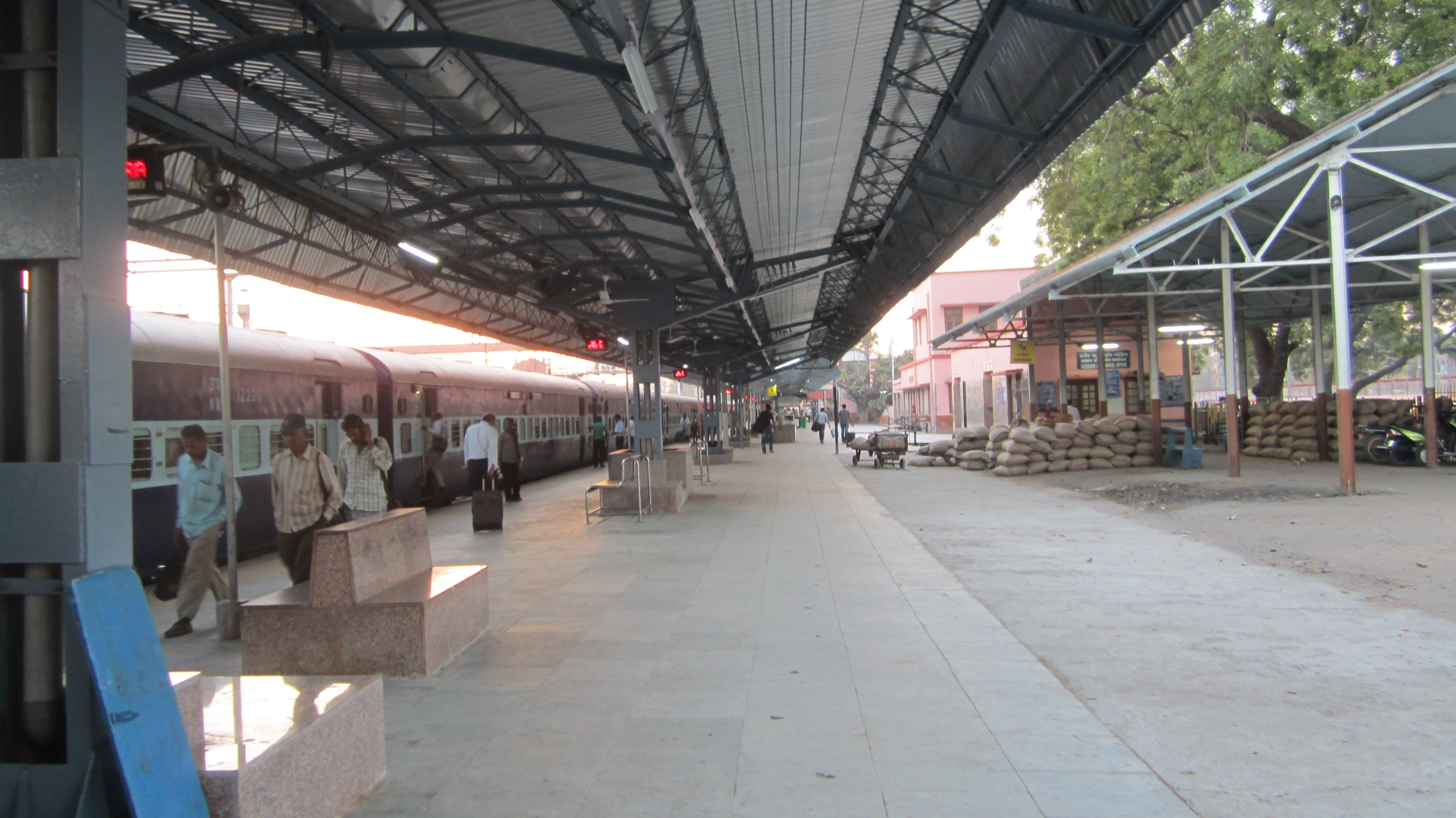
- Godhra Junction

General information
- Location: National Highway 47, Godhra, Gujarat; India
- Coordinates: 22°46′34″N 73°36′21″E
- Elevation: 119.480 metres (391.99 ft)
- System: Indian Railways station
- Owner: Indian Railways
- Operator: Western Railway
- Lines: New Delhi–Mumbai main line Anand–Godhra section
- Platforms: 5
- Tracks: 6
- Connections: Auto stand

Construction
- Structure type: Standard (on-ground station)
- Parking: Yes
- Cycle facilities: Yes

Other information
- Status: Functioning
- Station code: GDA
- Zone(s): Western Railway
- Division(s): Vadodara

History
- Rebuilt: 1956
Location
- Location within India Location within Gujarat

Godhra Junction railway station (code GDA) is a railway station in Panchmahal district, Gujarat, India. It serves Godhra city and the surrounding areas like Lunawada and Devgarh-Baria. The station has three platforms. It is under the Vadodara railway division of Western Railway zone of Indian Railways, located on the New Delhi–Mumbai main line.

== History ==
The Godhra train burning occurred on the morning of 27 February 2002, in which 59 people died in a fire inside the Sabarmati Express train near the station. The victims included Hindu pilgrims who were returning from the city of Ayodhya after a religious ceremony at the disputed Babri Masjid site.

== Major trains ==
The following MEMU trains start/terminate here:

- 69123/24 Godhra – Anand
- 69121/22 Godhra – Vadodara
- 69145/46 Godhra – Anand
- 69125/26 Godhra – Anand
- 69147/48 Godhra – Anand
