= List of railway junction stations in India =

This article contains a list of railway junction stations in India. Some of the top railway stations in India are: Howrah with daily passengers of over one million, Sealdah (1.2m), Chhatrapati Shivaji Maharaj Terminus (1m; UNESCO world heritage site), Chennai Central (350,000), New Delhi (500,000), Ahmedabad (200,000), Kharagpur (fourth largest platform in India) and Kanpur (200,000).

== Gallery ==
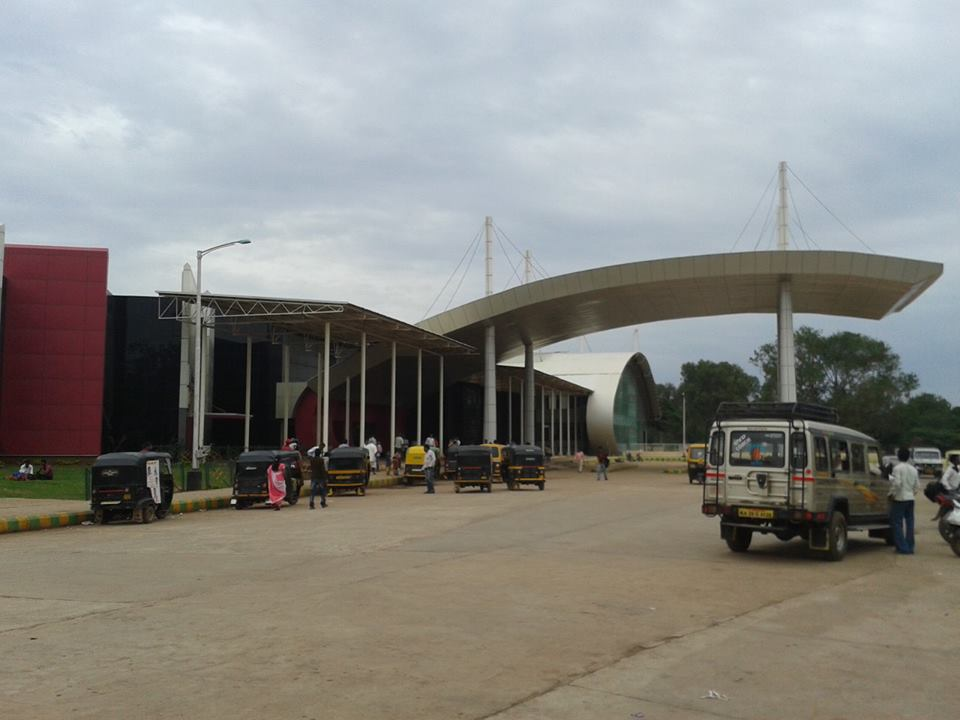
Hubballi Junction

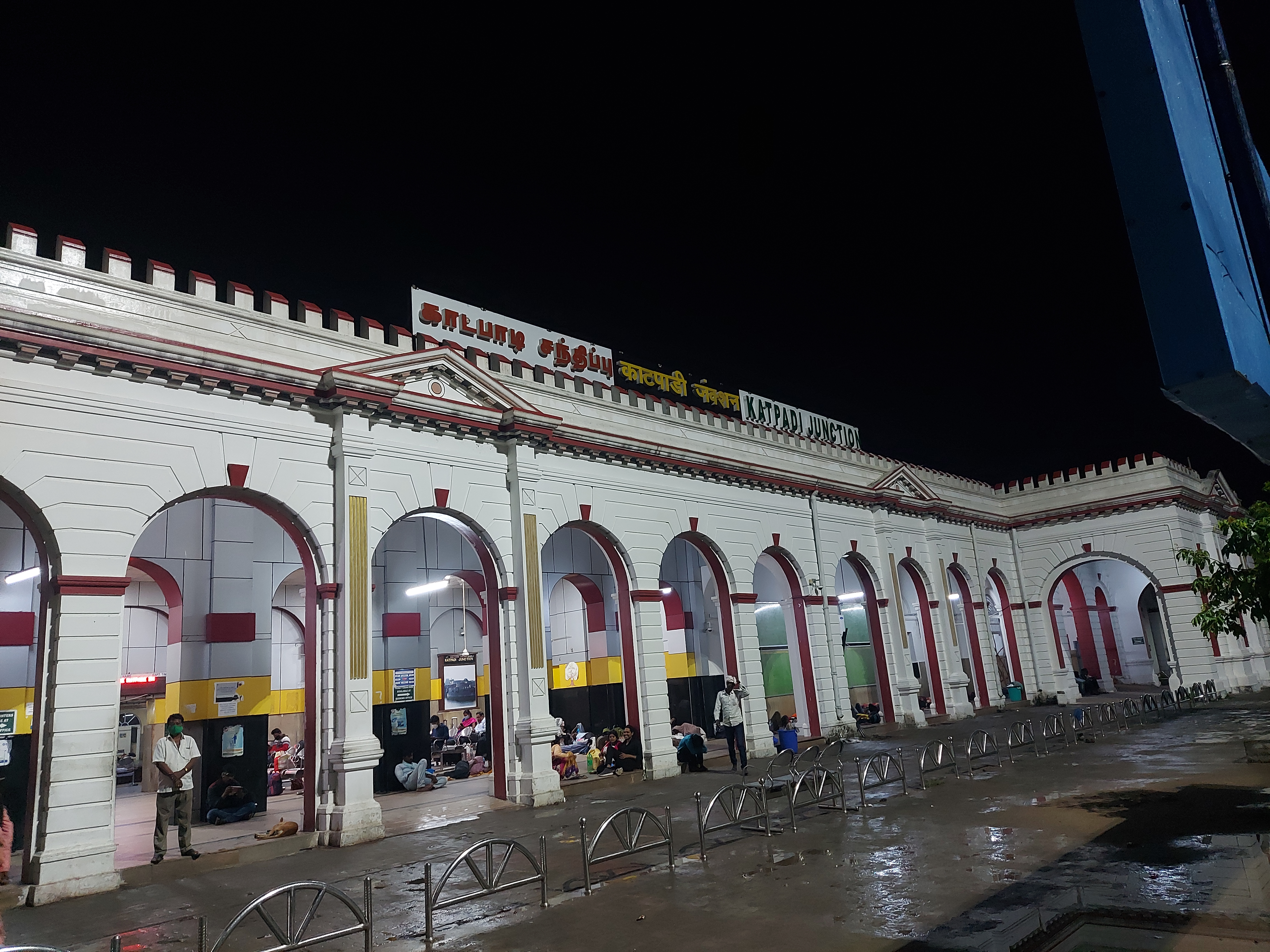
Katpadi Junction

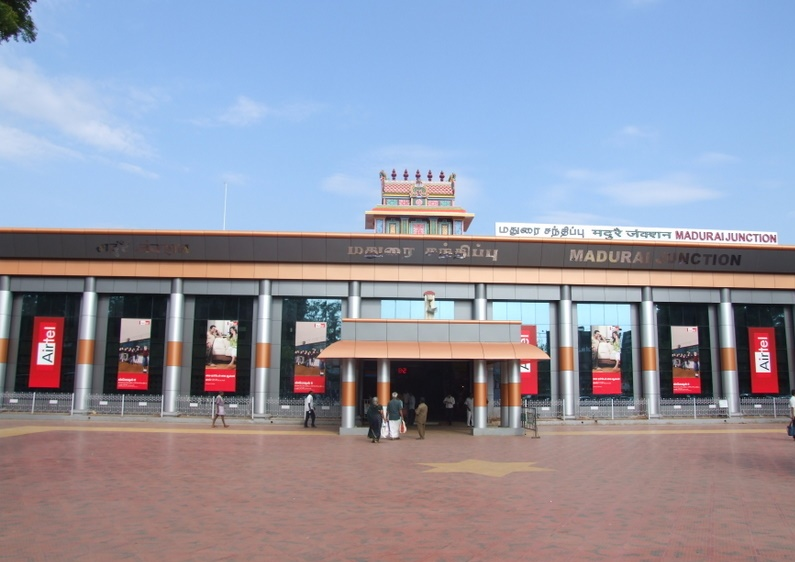
Madurai Junction

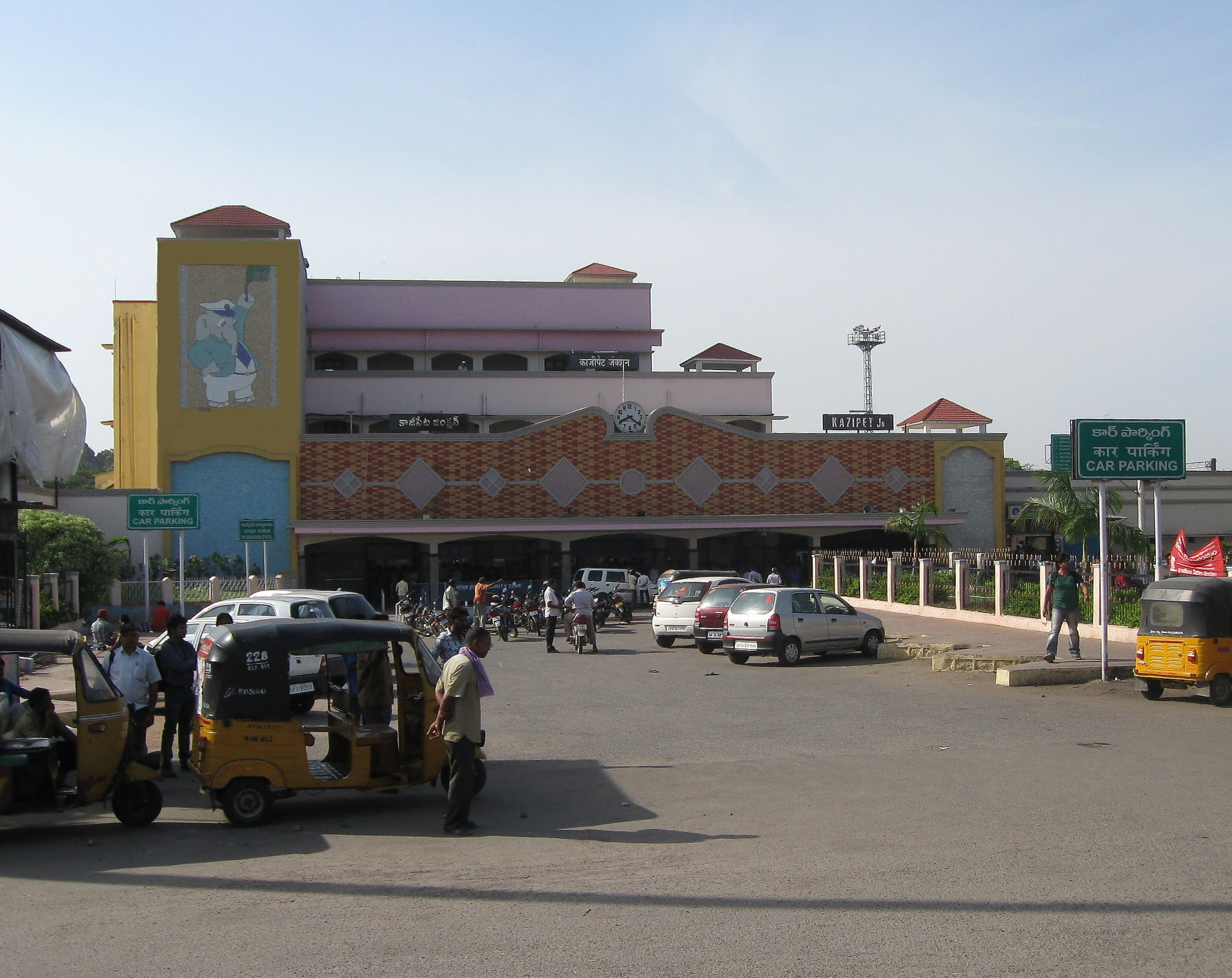
Kazipet Junction

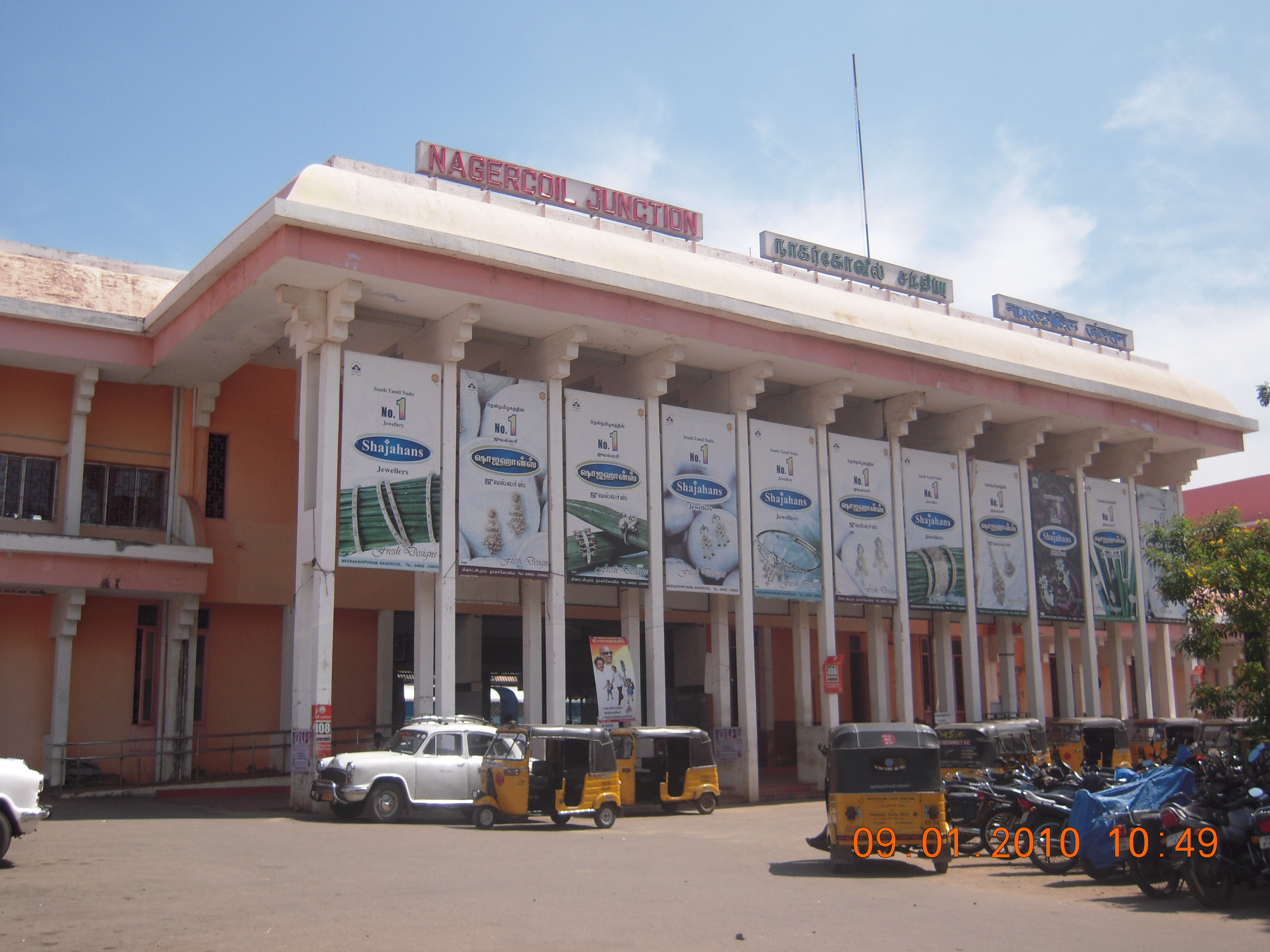
Nagercoil Junction

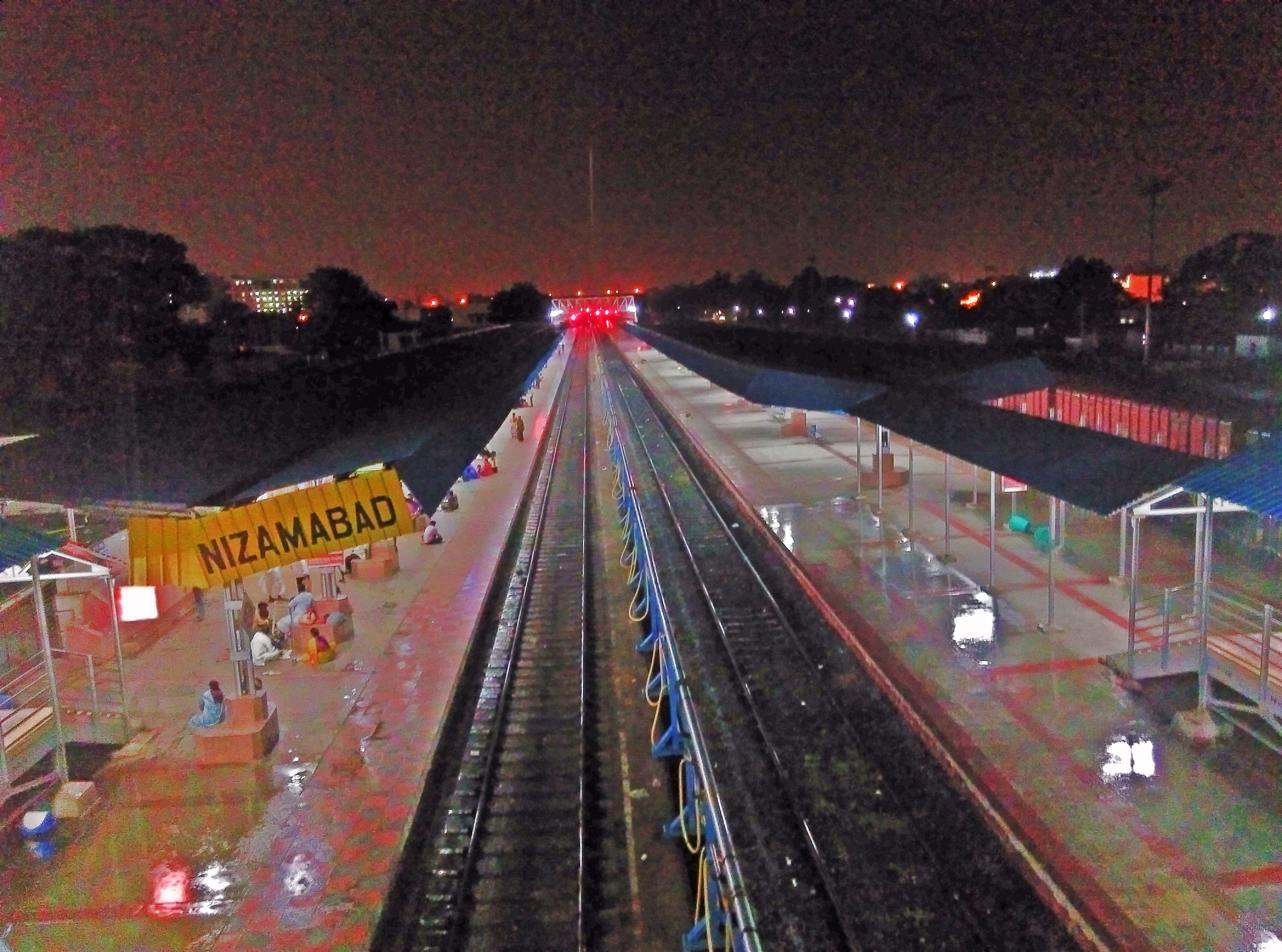
Nizamabad Junction

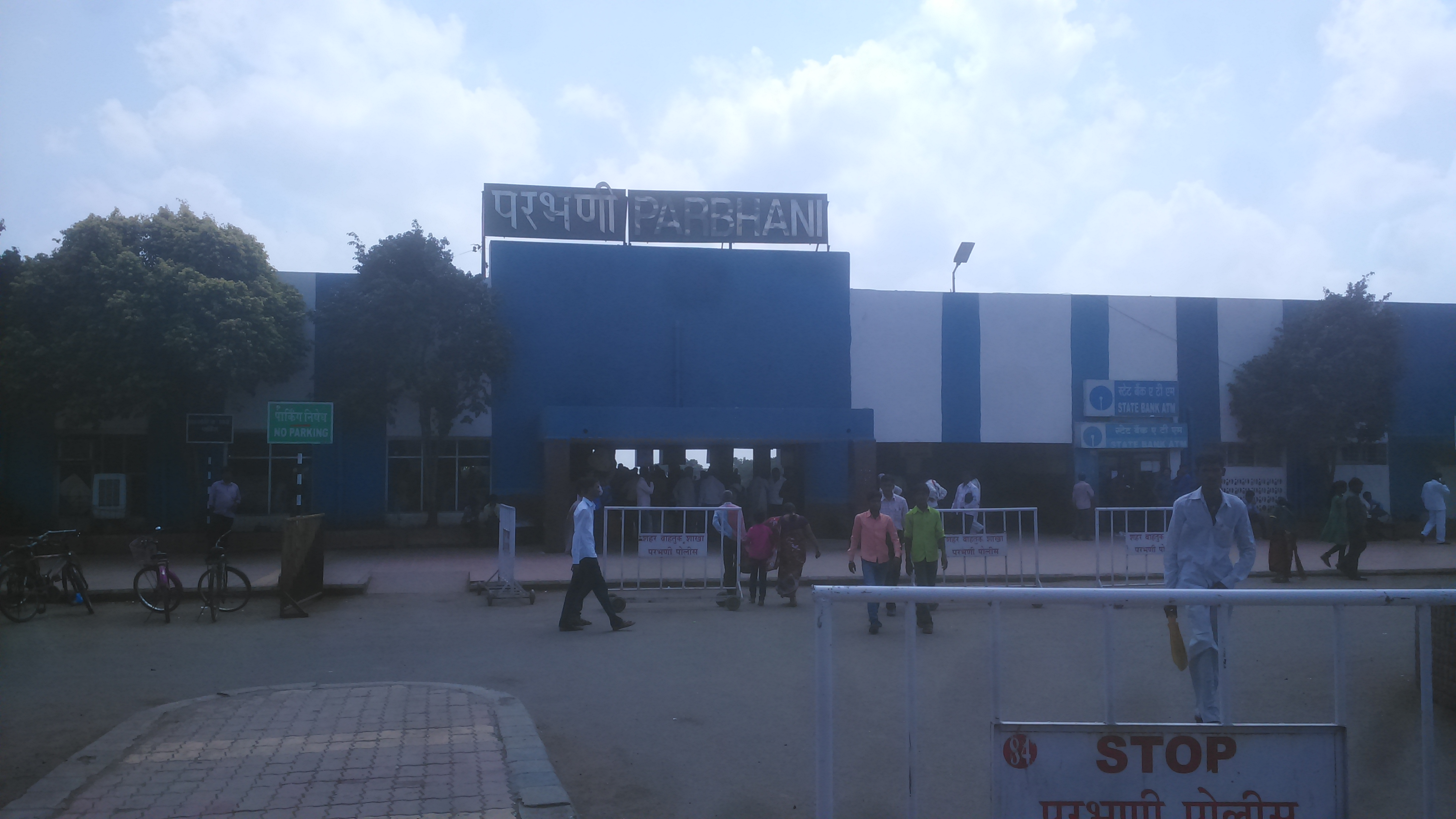
Parbhani Junction

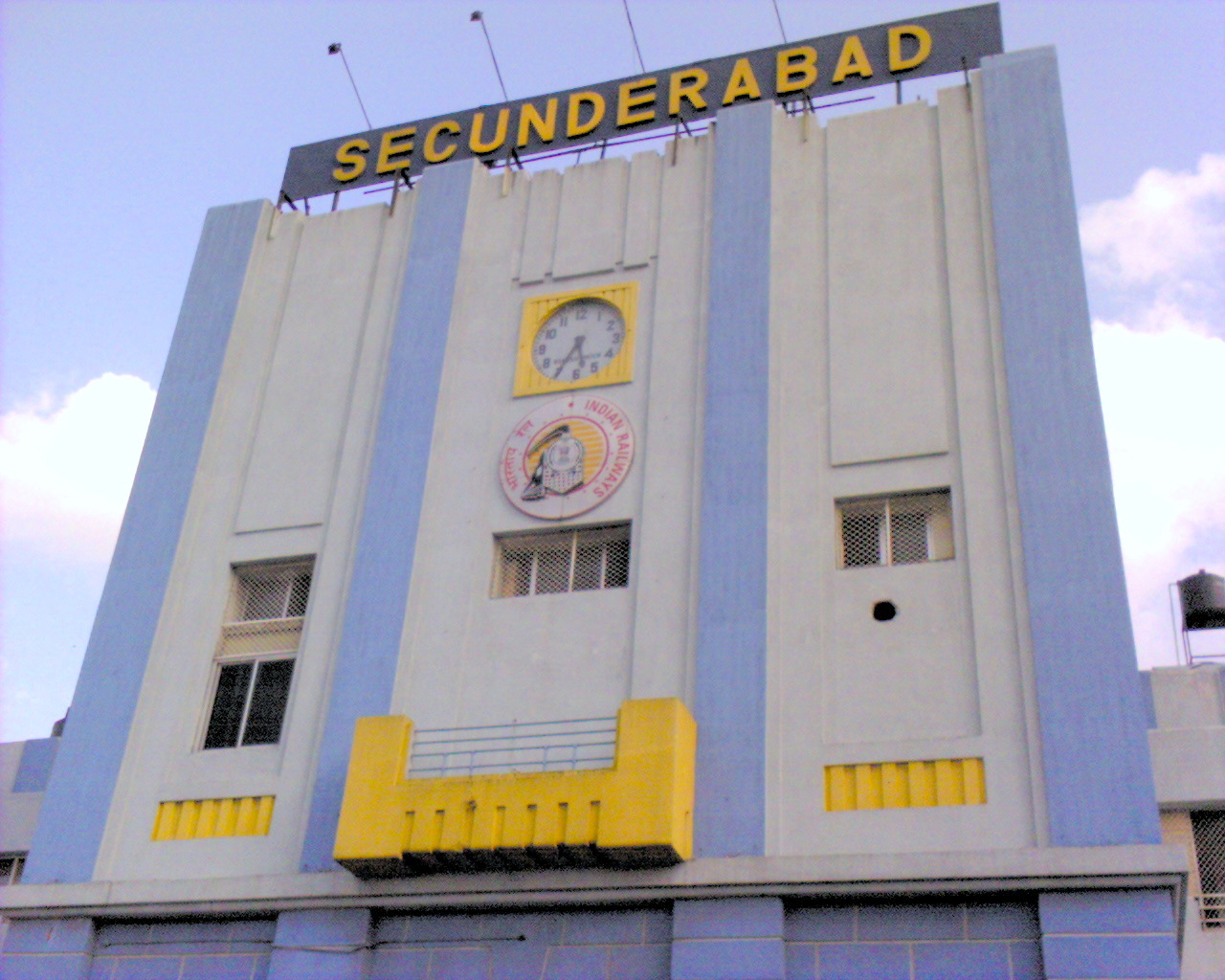
Secunderabad Junction

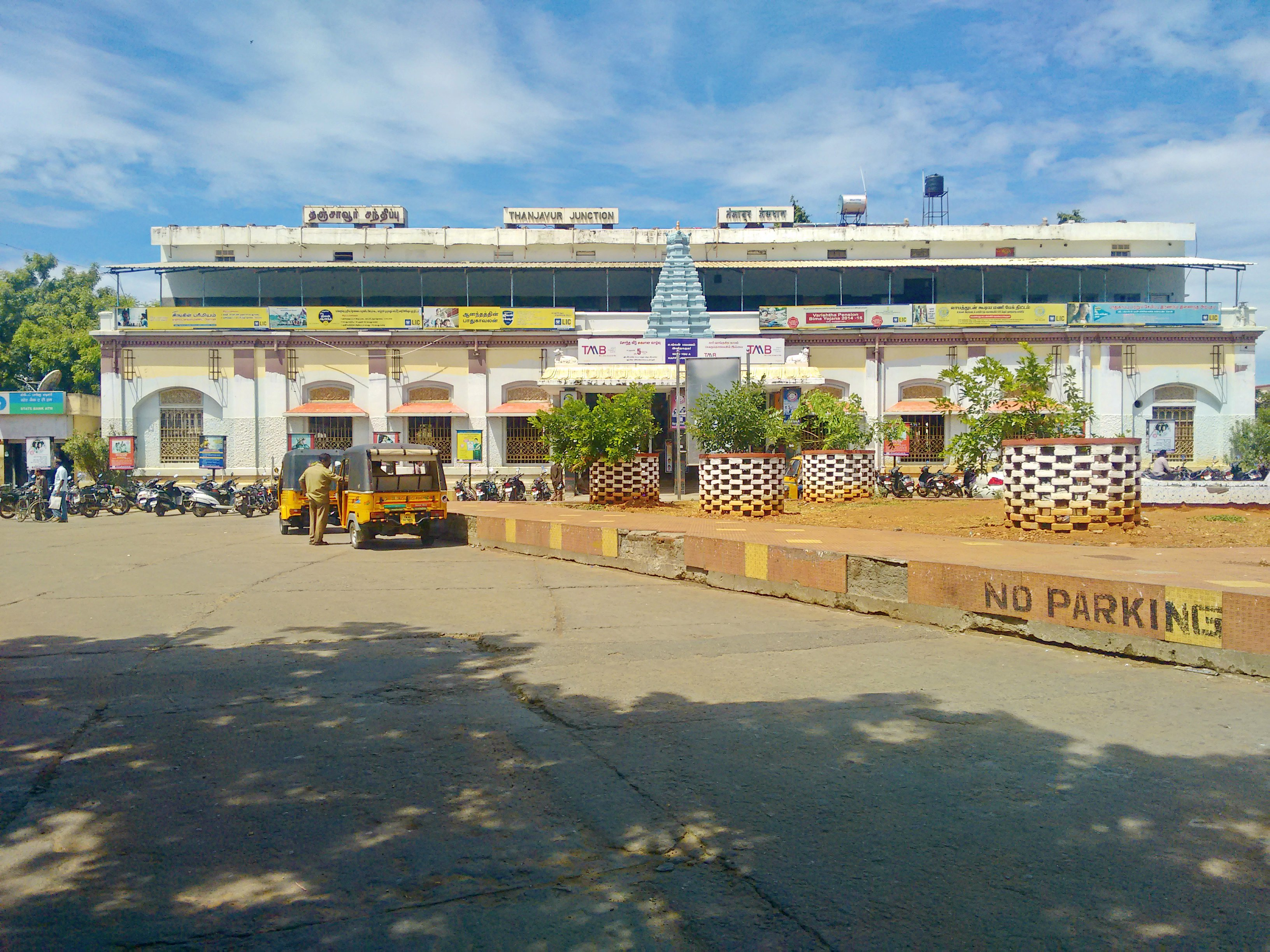
Thanjavur Junction

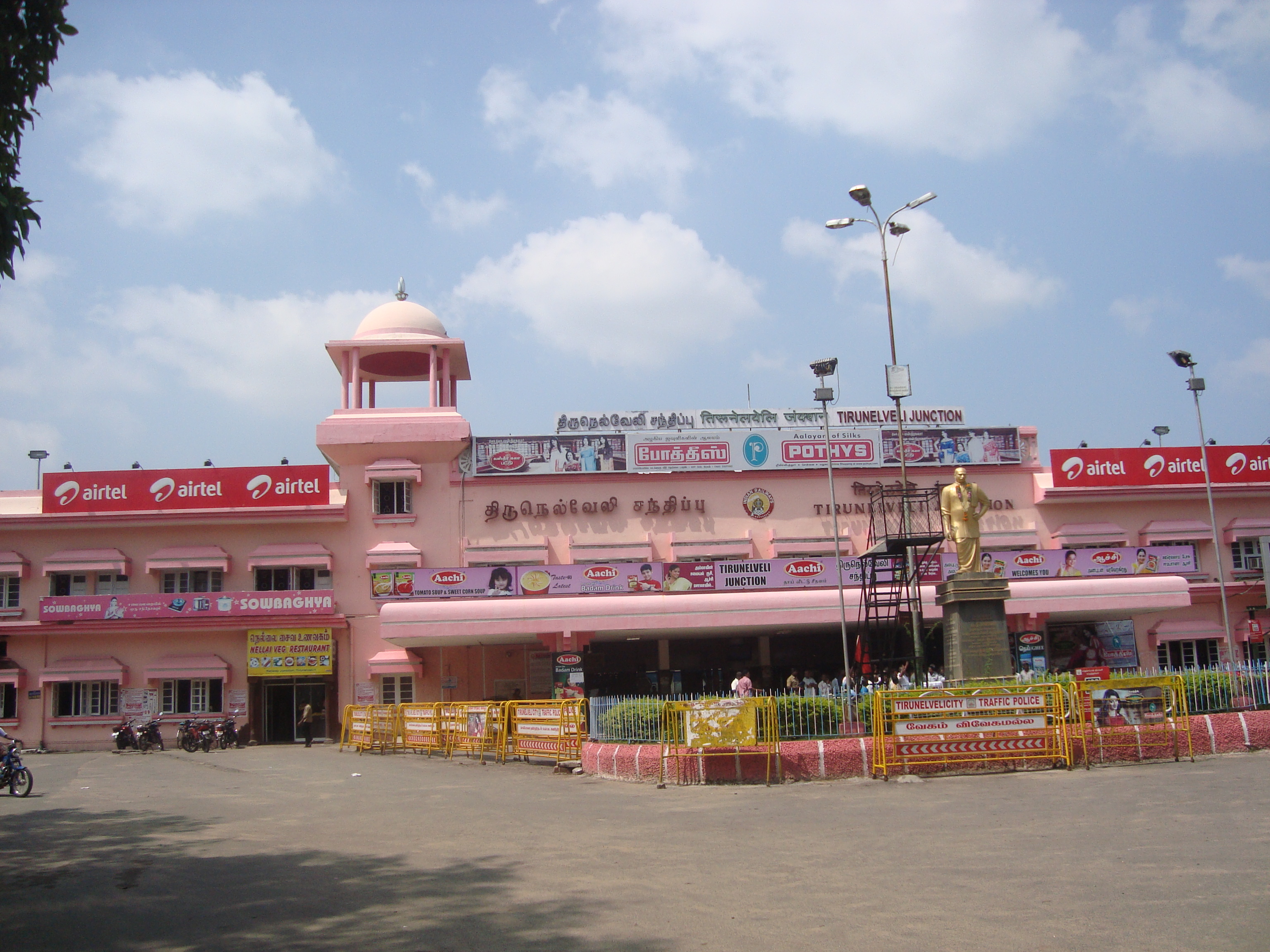
Tirunelveli Junction

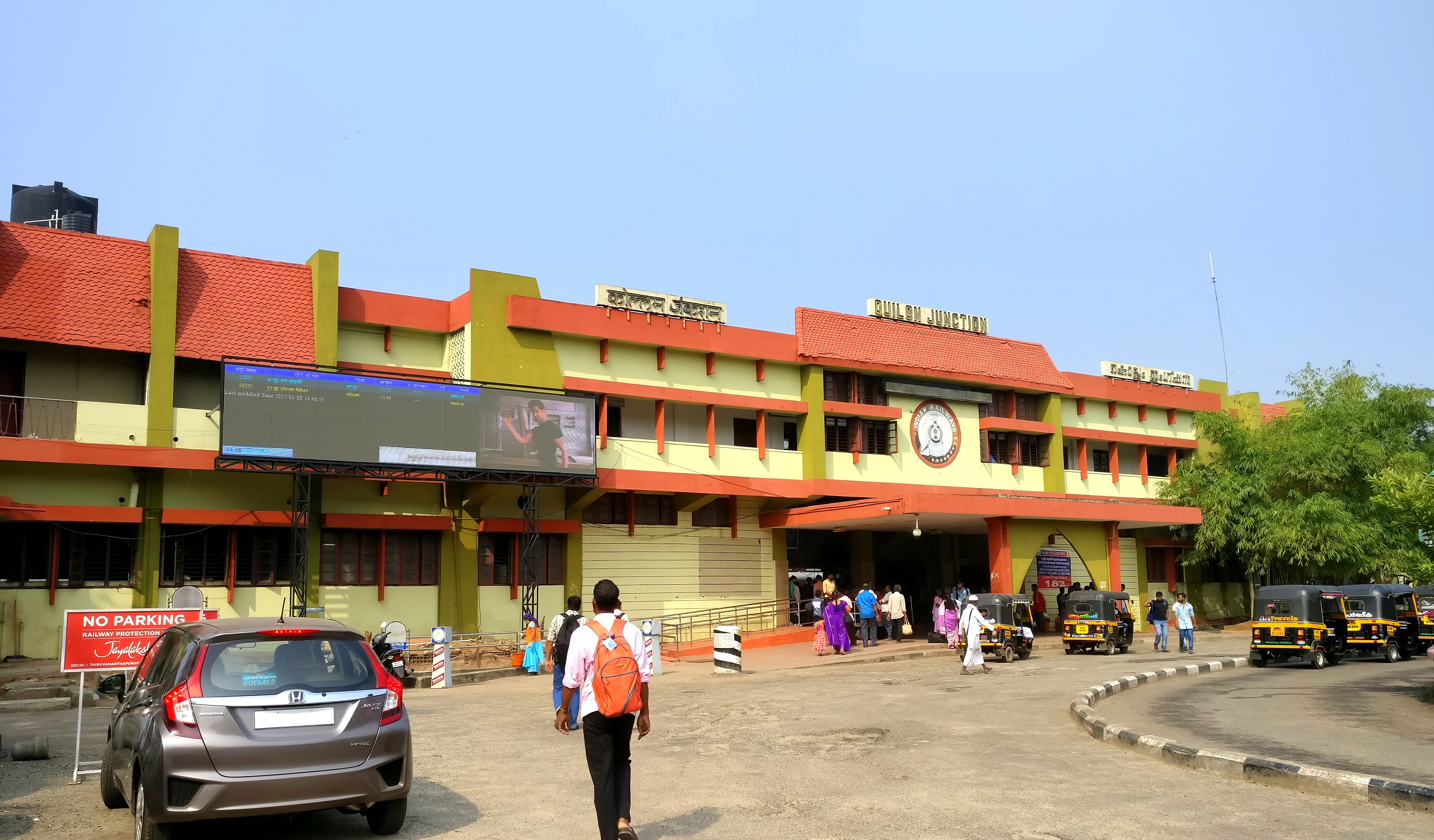
Kollam Junction

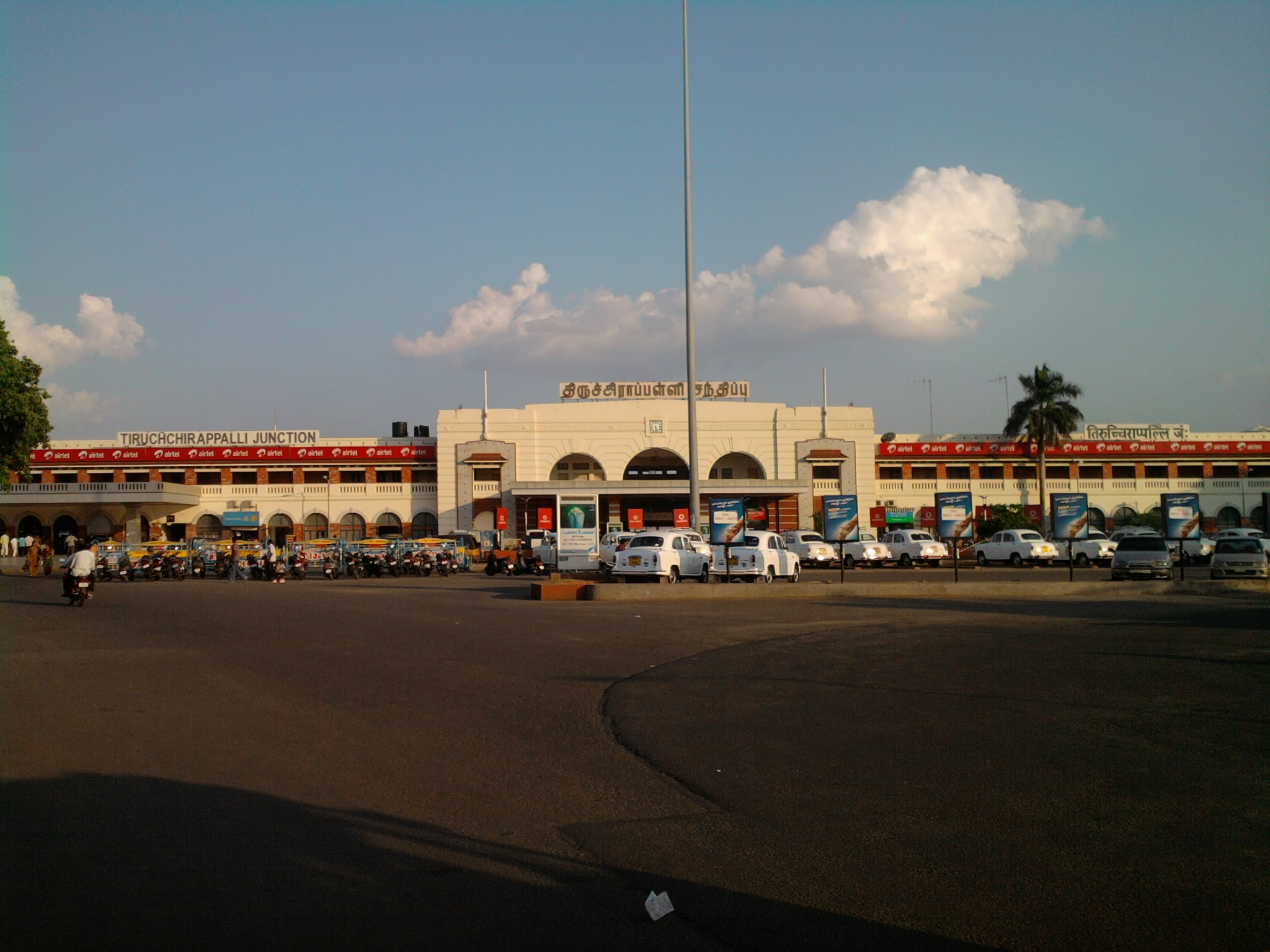
Tiruchirappalli Junction

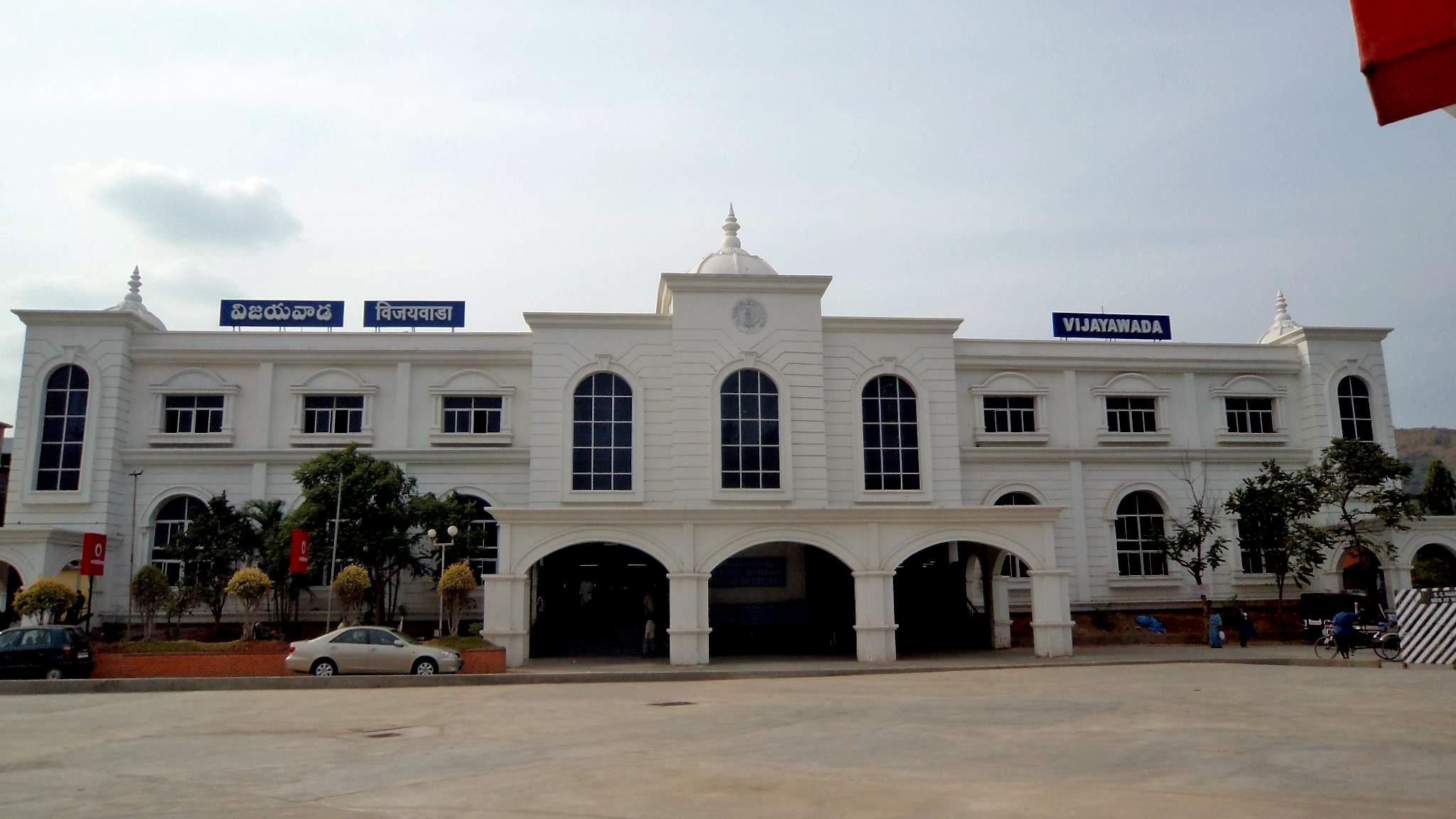
Vijayawada Junction

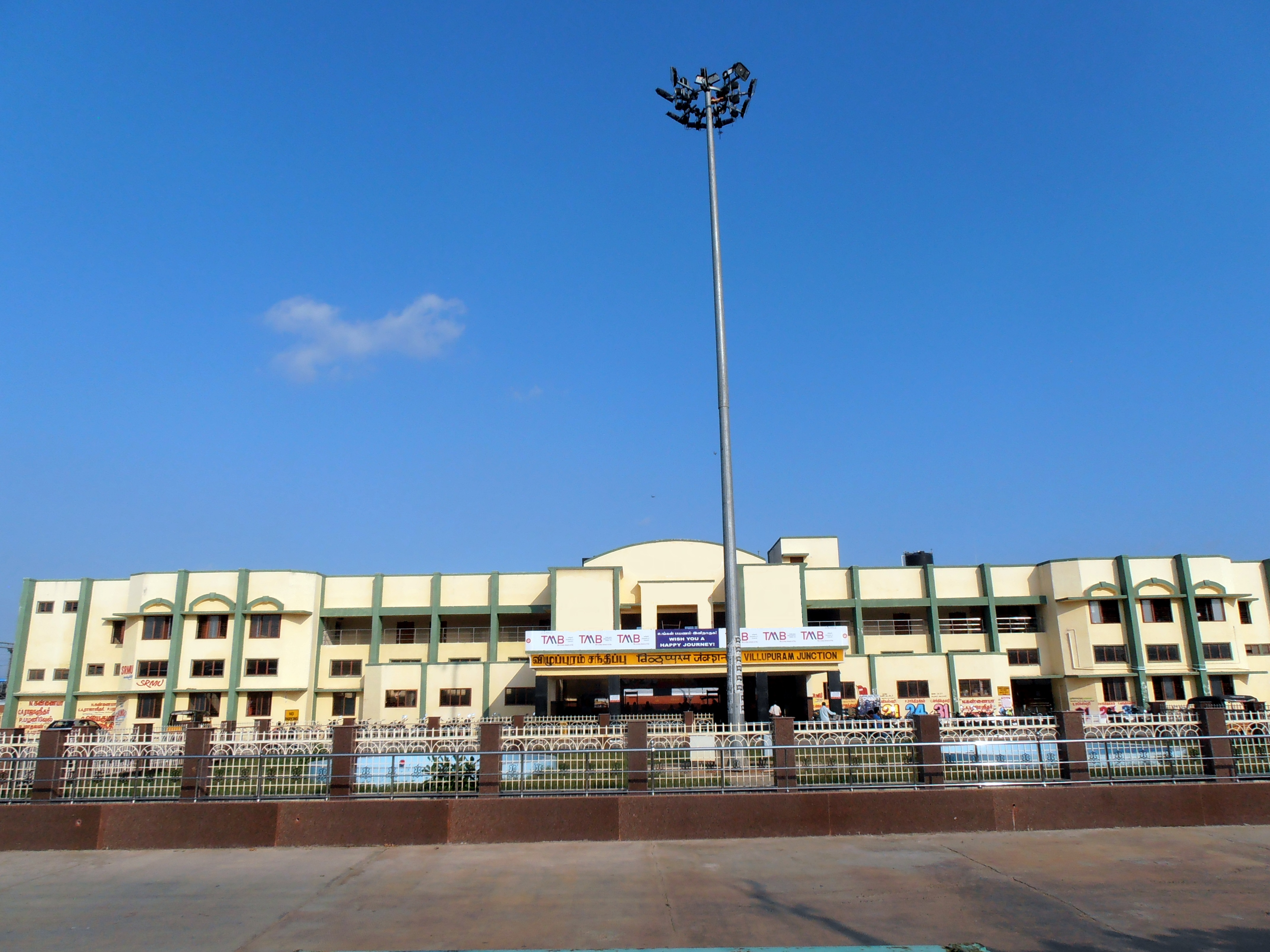
Viluppuram Junction

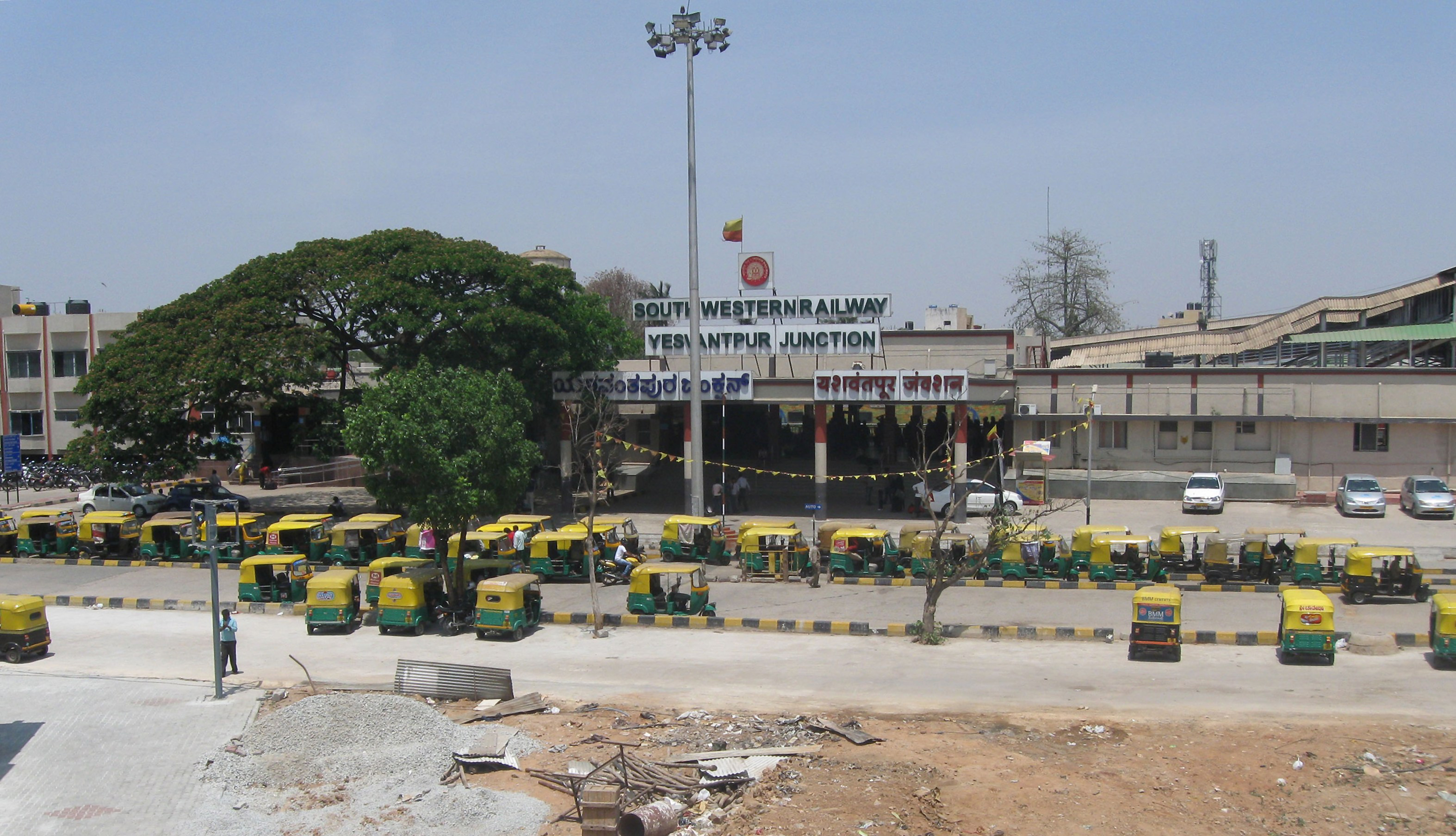
Yesvantpur Junction

== List ==
Station	Routes	Division	State
Ambliyasan Junction	3	Ahmedabad	Gujarat
Abohar Junction	3	Ambala	Punjab
Achhnera Junction	3	Agra	Uttar Pradesh
Adra Junction	4	Adra	West Bengal
Agra Cantonment	4	Agra	Uttar Pradesh
Ahmadpur Junction	3	Howrah	West Bengal
Ajmer Junction	4	Ajmer	Rajasthan
Akbarpur Junction	3	Lucknow NR	Uttar Pradesh
Akola Junction	4	Bhusawal	Maharashtra
Aligarh Junction	5	Prayagraj	Uttar Pradesh
Alipurduar Junction	3	Alipurduar	West Bengal
Ambala Cantonment Junction	4	Ambala	Haryana
Amla Junction	3	Nagpur CR	Madhya Pradesh
Amritsar Junction	5	Firozpur	Punjab
Anand Junction	4	Vadodara	Gujarat
Andal Junction	4	Asansol	West Bengal
Ankleshwar Junction	3	Vadodara	Gujarat
Anuppur Junction	3	Bilaspur	Madhya Pradesh
Arakkonam Junction	4	Chennai	Tamil Nadu
Ara Junction	3	Danapur	Bihar
Arsikere Junction	3	Mysore	Karnataka
Asansol Junction	4	Asansol	West Bengal
Aunrihar Junction	4	Varanasi	Uttar Pradesh
Ayodhya Junction	3	Lucknow NR	Uttar Pradesh
Azimganj Junction	3	Howrah	West Bengal
Badarpur Junction	4	Lumding	Assam
Badnera Junction	4	Bhusawal	Maharashtra
Bakhtiyarpur Junction	3	Danapur	Bihar
Balaghat Junction	3	Nagpur SEC	Madhya Pradesh
Balangir Junction	3	Sambalpur	Odisha
Balharshah Junction	4	Nagpur CR	Maharashtra
Ballari Junction	3	Hubli	Karnataka
Ballygunge Junction	4	Sealdah	West Bengal
Bandel Junction	4	Howrah	West Bengal
Bangarapet Junction	4	Bangalore	Karnataka
Bankura Junction	3	Adra	West Bengal
Barang Junction	3	Khurda Road	Odisha
Barauni Junction	4	Sonpur	Bihar
Barddhaman Junction	4	Howrah	West Bengal
Bareilly Junction	5	Moradabad, Izzatnagar	Uttar Pradesh
Barharwa Junction	3	Malda	Jharkhand
Barkakana Junction	4	Dhanbad	Jharkhand
Barsoi Junction	5	Katihar	Bihar
Baruipur Junction	3	Sealdah	West Bengal
Batala Junction	3	Firozpur	Punjab
Bathinda Junction	6	Ambala	Punjab
Bangalore Cantonment	3	Bangalore	Karnataka
Bhagalpur Junction	4	Malda	Bihar
Bharuch Junction	3	Vadodara	Gujarat
Bhildi Junction	3	Ahmedabad	Gujarat
Bhimavaram Junction	3	Vijayawada	Andhra Pradesh
Bhiwani Junction	3	Bikaner	Rajasthan
Bhojipura Junction	3	Izzatnagar	Uttar Pradesh
Bhopal Junction	3	Bhopal	Madhya Pradesh
Bhusaval Junction	3	Bhusawal	Maharashtra
Bihar Sharif Junction	3	Danapur	Bihar
Bikaner Junction	4	Bikaner	Rajasthan
Bilaspur Junction	3	Bilaspur	Chhattisgarh
Bilimora Junction	3	Mumbai WR	Gujarat
Bimalgarh Junction	3	Chakradharpur	Odisha
Bina Junction	4	Bhopal	Madhya Pradesh
Birur Junction	3	Mysore	Karnataka
Bishnupur Junction	3	Adra	West Bengal
Chalisgaon Junction	3	Bhusawal	Maharashtra
Chhapra Junction	3	Varanasi	Bihar
Champa Junction	3	Bilaspur	Chhattisgarh
Chandigarh Junction	4	Ambala	Chandigarh
Chandrapura Junction	3	Dhanbad	Jharkhand
Chengalpattu Junction	3	Chennai	Tamil Nadu
Chhindwara Junction	3	Nagpur SEC	Madhya Pradesh
Chittaurgarh Junction	4	Ratlam	Rajasthan
Coimbatore North Junction	3	Salem	Tamil Nadu
Cuddalore Port Junction	3	Tiruchirappalli	Tamil Nadu
Dabhoi Junction	5	Vadodara	Gujarat
Dankuni Junction	4	Howrah	West Bengal
Damodar Junction	3	Adra	West Bengal
Daund Junction	4	Solapur	Maharashtra
Deoghar Junction	3	Asansol	Jharkhand
Delhi Junction	3	Delhi	Delhi
Dewas Junction	3	Ratlam	Madhya Pradesh
Dhanbad Junction	5	Dhanbad	Jharkhand
Dharmavaram Junction	4	Guntakal	Andhra Pradesh
Dhasa Junction	3	Bhavnagar	Gujarat
Botad Junction	3	Bhavnagar	Gujarat
Khijadiya Junction	3	Bhavnagar	Gujarat
Dhola Junction	3	Bhavnagar	Gujarat
Dhone Junction	3	Guntakal	Andhra Pradesh
Dhrangadhra Junction	4	Ahmedabad	Gujarat
Dhuri Junction	4	Ambala	Punjab
Dindigul Junction	4	Madurai	Tamil Nadu
Diva Junction	4	Mumbai CR	Maharashtra
Dornakal Junction	3	Secunderabad	Telangana
Dum Dum Junction	5	Sealdah	West Bengal
Durg Junction	3	Raipur	Chhattisgarh
Ernakulam Junction	4	Thiruvananthapuram	Kerala
Erode Junction	4	Salem	Tamil Nadu
Etawah Junction	5	Prayagraj	Uttar Pradesh
Farrukhabad Junction	3	Izzatnagar	Uttar Pradesh
Fatuha Junction	3	Danapur	Bihar
Fazilka Junction	3	Firozpur	Punjab
Firozpur Cantonment	4	Firozpur	Punjab
Gadag Junction	3	Hubli	Karnataka
Gandhidham Junction	4	Ahmedabad	Gujarat
Garwa Road Junction	3	Dhanbad	Jharkhand
Gaya Junction	4	Pandit Deen Dayal Upadhyaya	Bihar
Godhra Junction	4	Vadodara	Gujarat
Gomoh Junction	4	Dhanbad	Jharkhand
Gondia Junction	4	Nagpur SEC	Maharashtra
Gooty Junction	4	Guntakal	Andhra Pradesh
Gorakhpur Junction	3	Lucknow NER	Uttar Pradesh
Gudivada Junction	3	Vijayawada	Andhra Pradesh
Gudur Junction	3	Vijayawada	Andhra Pradesh
Guntakal Junction	5	Guntakal	Andhra Pradesh
Guntur Junction	4	Guntur	Andhra Pradesh
Gwalior Junction	5	Jhansi	Madhya Pradesh
Hajipur Junction	3	Sonpur	Bihar
Hanumangarh Junction	4	Bikaner	Rajasthan
Hapur Junction	4	Moradabad	Uttar Pradesh
Haridwar Junction	4	Moradabad	Uttarakhand
Hassan Junction	4	Mysore	Karnataka
Hathras Junction	4	Prayagraj	Uttar Pradesh
Hisar Junction	4	Bikaner	Haryana
Hotgi Junction	3	Solapur	Maharashtra
Howrah Junction	3	Howrah	West Bengal
Hubballi Junction	3	Hubli	Karnataka
Indara Junction	4	Varanasi	Uttar Pradesh
Indore Junction	3	Ratlam	Madhya Pradesh
Irugur Junction	3	Salem	Tamil Nadu
Itarsi Junction	4	Bhopal	Madhya Pradesh
Itwari Junction	4	Nagpur SEC	Maharashtra
Jabalpur Junction	3	Jabalpur	Madhya Pradesh
Jaipur Junction	5	Jaipur	Rajasthan
Jakhal Junction	4	Delhi	Haryana
Jalandhar City Junction	5	Firozpur	Punjab
Jalgaon Junction	3	Bhusawal	Maharashtra
Jamalpur Junction	3	Malda	Bihar
Jankampet Junction	3	Hyderabad	Telangana
Jasidih Junction	3	Asansol	Jharkhand
Jatdumri Junction	4	Danapur	Bihar
Jaunpur Junction	3	Lucknow NR	Uttar Pradesh
Jetalsar Junction	4	Bhavnagar	Gujarat
Jhansi Junction	4	Jhansi	Uttar Pradesh
Jharsuguda Junction	3	Chakradharpur	Odisha
Jind Junction	4	Delhi	Haryana
Jodhpur Junction	3	Jodhpur	Rajasthan
Jolarpettai Junction	3	Chennai	Tamil Nadu
Joychandi Pahar Junction	3	Adra	West Bengal
Junagadh Junction	3	Bhavnagar	Gujarat
Kadur Junction	3	Mysore	Karnataka
Kalaburagi Junction	3	Solapur	Karnataka
Kalinarayanpur Junction	3	Sealdah	West Bengal
Kalol Junction	4	Ahmedabad	Gujarat
Kalyan Junction	3	Mumbai CR	Maharashtra
Kamakhya Junction	3	Lumding	Assam
Kanalus Junction	4	Rajkot	Gujarat
Kanhan Junction	3	Nagpur SEC	Maharashtra
Karaikudi Junction	3	Madurai	Tamil Nadu
Karimganj Junction	3	Lumding	Assam
Karur Junction	4	Salem	Tamil Nadu
Kashipur Junction	4	Izzatnagar	Uttarakhand
Katihar Junction	5	Katihar	Bihar
Katni Junction	5	Jabalpur	Madhya Pradesh
Katpadi Junction	4	Chennai	Tamil Nadu
Katwa Junction	4	Howrah	West Bengal
Kayamkulam Junction	3	Thiruvananthapuram	Kerala
Kazipet Junction	3	Secunderabad	Telangana
Khagaria Junction	3	Sonpur	Bihar
Kharagpur Junction	4	Kharagpur	West Bengal
Khijadiya Junction	3	Rajkot	Gujarat
Khurda Road Junction	4	Khurda Road	Odisha
Kiul Junction	4	Danapur	Bihar
Koderma Junction	4	Dhanbad	Jharkhand
Kollam Junction	3	Thiruvananthapuram	Kerala
Koraput Junction	3	Rayagada	Odisha
Kosamba Junction	3	Vadodara	Gujarat
Kota Junction	5	Kota	Rajasthan
Kotkapura Junction	3	Firozpur	Punjab
Kotshila Junction	3	Adra	West Bengal
Kottavalasa Junction	3	Waltair	Andhra Pradesh
Krishna Canal Junction	3	Vijayawada	Andhra Pradesh
Krishnanagar City Junction	3	Sealdah	West Bengal
Kurduvadi Junction	4	Solapur	Maharashtra
Lalkuan Junction	4	Izzatnagar	Uttarakhand
Lanjigarh Road Junction	3	Sambalpur	Odisha
Laksar Junction	4	Moradabad	Uttarakhand
Londa Junction	3	Hubli	Karnataka
Lucknow Junction	5	Lucknow NER	Uttar Pradesh
Ludhiana Junction	5	Firozpur	Punjab
Madhupur Junction	3	Asansol	Jharkhand
Madurai Junction	4	Madurai	Tamil Nadu
Magnesite Junction	3	Salem	Tamil Nadu
Mahuda Junction	5	Adra	Jharkhand
Mahesana Junction	5	Ahmedabad	Gujarat
Mahim Junction	3	Mumbai WR	Maharashtra
Majri Junction	3	Nagpur CR	Maharashtra
Maksi Junction	4	Ratlam	Madhya Pradesh
Manamadurai Junction	4	Madurai	Tamil Nadu
Mangalore Junction	3	Palakkad	Karnataka
Manikpur Junction	3	Prayagraj	Uttar Pradesh
Manmad Junction	4	Bhusawal	Maharashtra
Manpur Junction	3	Pandit Deen Dayal Upadhyaya	Bihar
Mansi Junction	4	Sonpur	Bihar
Marwar Junction	4	Ajmer	Rajasthan
Mathura Junction	7	Agra	Uttar Pradesh
Mavli Junction	4	Ajmer	Rajasthan
Mayiladuthurai Junction	3	Tiruchirappalli	Tamil Nadu
Merta Road Junction	4	Jodhpur	Rajasthan
Miraj Junction	4	Pune	Maharashtra
Miyagam Karjan Junction	4	Vadodara	Gujarat
Moradabad Junction	5	Moradabad	Uttar Pradesh
Muri Junction	4	Ranchi	Jharkhand
Murtizapur Junction	4	Bhusawal	Maharashtra
Muzaffarpur Junction	4	Sonpur	Bihar
Nadiad Junction	4	Vadodara	Gujarat
Nagbhir Junction	3	Nagpur SEC	Maharashtra
Nagda Junction	3	Ratlam	Madhya Pradesh
Nagapattinam Junction	3	Tiruchirappalli	Tamil Nadu
Nagercoil Junction	3	Thiruvananthapuram	Tamil Nadu
Nagpur Junction	4	Nagpur CR	Maharashtra
Naihati Junction	3	Sealdah	West Bengal
Nainpur Junction	4	Nagpur SEC	Madhya Pradesh
Nalhati Junction	3	Howrah	West Bengal
Narkatiaganj Junction	4	Samastipur	Bihar
Narkher Junction	3	Nagpur CR	Maharashtra
Neora Junction	3	Danapur	Bihar
Neral Junction	3	Mumbai CR	Maharashtra
New Cooch Behar Junction	6	Alipurduar	West Bengal
New Farakka Junction	3	Malda	West Bengal
New Jalpaiguri Junction	4	Katihar	West Bengal
Nidadavolu Junction	3	Vijayawada	Andhra Pradesh
Nidamangalam Junction	3	Tiruchirappalli	Tamil Nadu
Nizamabad Junction	3	Hyderabad	Telangana
Omalur Junction	3	Salem	Tamil Nadu
Pachora Junction	3	Bhusawal	Maharashtra
Pakala Junction	3	Guntakal	Andhra Pradesh
Palakkad Junction	3	Palakkad	Kerala
Palanpur Junction	3	Ahmedabad	Gujarat
Panipat Junction	4	Delhi	Haryana
Panskura Junction	3	Howrah	West Bengal
Panvel Junction	5	Mumbai CR	Maharashtra
Parbhani Junction	3	Nanded	Maharashtra
Patna Junction	5	Danapur	Bihar
Pathankot Junction	3	Firozpur	Punjab
Peddapalli Junction	3	Secunderabad	Telangana
Penukonda Junction	3	Bangalore	Andhra Pradesh
Peralam Junction	3	Tiruchirappalli	Tamil Nadu
Phagwara Junction	3	Firozpur	Punjab
Phillaur Junction	3	Firozpur	Punjab
Pandit Deen Dayal Upadhyaya Junction	3	Pandit Deen Dayal Upadhyaya	Uttar Pradesh
Phulera Junction	4	Jaipur	Rajasthan
Pilibhit Junction	4	Izzatnagar	Uttar Pradesh
Podanur Junction	4	Salem	Tamil Nadu
Pollachi Junction	3	Palakkad	Tamil Nadu
Prachi Road Junction	3	Bhavnagar	Gujarat
Pratapgarh Junction	3	Lucknow NR	Uttar Pradesh
Pune Junction	3	Pune	Maharashtra
Puntamba Junction	3	Solapur	Maharashtra
Prayagraj Junction	4	Prayagraj	Uttar Pradesh
Purna Junction	3	Nanded	Maharashtra
Purulia Junction	3	Adra	West Bengal
Raipur Junction	4	Raipur	Chhattisgarh
Raiwala Junction	3	Moradabad	Uttarakhand
Rajathgarh Junction	3	Khurda Road	Odisha
Rajkharsawan Junction	3	Chakradharpur	Jharkhand
Rajkot Junction	3	Rajkot	Gujarat
Rajpura Junction	3	Ambala	Punjab
Rajula Junction	3	Bhavnagar	Gujarat
Ramganj Mandi Junction	3	Kota	Rajasthan
Ramkanali Junction	3	Adra	West Bengal
Rampurhat Junction	3	Howrah	West Bengal
Ranaghat Junction	4	Sealdah	West Bengal
Ranchi Junction	4	Ranchi	Jharkhand
Rangiya Junction	3	Rangiya	Assam
Raninagar Jalpaiguri Junction	3	Rangiya	West Bengal
Ratlam Junction	4	Ratlam	Madhya Pradesh
Renigunta Junction	4	Guntakal	Andhra Pradesh
Ringas Junction	3	Jaipur	Rajasthan
Rohtak Junction	4	Delhi	Haryana
Rourkela Junction	4	Chakradharpur	Odisha
Sakri Junction	4	Samastipur	Bihar
Saharanpur Junction	4	Ambala	Uttar Pradesh
Saharsa Junction	3	Samastipur	Bihar
Sainthia Junction	3	Howrah	West Bengal
Salem Junction	5	Salem	Tamil Nadu
Samastipur Junction	4	Samastipur	Bihar
Sambalpur Junction	3	Sambalpur	Odisha
Santragachi Junction	4	Howrah	West Bengal
Sarupsar Junction	3	Bikaner	Rajasthan
Sasaram Junction	3	Pandit Deen Dayal Upadhyaya	Bihar
Satna Junction	3	Jabalpur	Madhya Pradesh
Secunderabad Junction	4	Secunderabad	Telangana
Sewagram Junction	3	Nagpur CR	Maharashtra
Seoraphuli Junction	3	Howrah	West Bengal
Shoranur Junction	4	Palakkad	Kerala
Sihor Junction	3	Bhavnagar	Gujarat
Sikar Junction	3	Jaipur	Rajasthan
Singapur Road Junction	3	Waltair	Odisha
Sitapur Junction	5	Lucknow NER	Uttar Pradesh
Sitapur City Junction	5	Moradabad	Uttar Pradesh
Solapur Junction	3	Solapur	Maharashtra
Sonipat Junction	4	Delhi	Haryana
Sonarpur Junction	3	Sealdah	West Bengal
Son Nagar Junction	3	Pandit Deen Dayal Upadhyaya	Uttar Pradesh
Sultanpur Junction	4	Lucknow NER	Uttar Pradesh
Surendranagar Junction	3	Rajkot	Gujarat
Talvadiya Junction	3	Bhopal	Madhya Pradesh
Talala Junction	3	Bhavnagar	Gujarat
Tamluk Junction	3	Kharagpur	West Bengal
Tatanagar Junction	3	Chakradharpur	Jharkhand
Tenali Junction	4	Vijayawada	Andhra Pradesh
Tenkasi Junction	3	Madurai	Tamil Nadu
Thanjavur Junction	3	Tiruchirappalli	Tamil Nadu
Thiruthuraipoondi Junction	3	Tiruchirappalli	Tamil Nadu
Thiruvarur Junction	3	Tiruchirappalli	Tamil Nadu
Tilaiya Junction	3	Danapur	Bihar
Tiruchirappalli Junction	5	Tiruchirappalli	Tamil Nadu
Tirunelveli Junction	4	Madurai	Tamil Nadu
Titlagarh Junction	3	Sambalpur	Odisha
Tori Junction	3	Dhanbad	Jharkhand
Tumsar Road Junction	3	Nagpur SEC	Maharashtra
Udhna Junction	3	Mumbai WR	Gujarat
Ujjain Junction	4	Ratlam	Madhya Pradesh
Unnao Junction	4	Lucknow NR	Uttar Pradesh
Vanchi Maniyachchi Junction	3	Madurai	Tamil Nadu
Varanasi Junction	5	Varanasi	Uttar Pradesh
Vasad Junction	3	Vadodara	Gujarat
Veraval Junction	3	Bhavnagar	Gujarat
Vijayawada Junction	4	Vijayawada	Andhra Pradesh
Vikarabad Junction	3	Secunderabad	Telangana
Viluppuram Junction	5	Tiruchirappalli	Tamil Nadu
Viramgam Junction	4	Ahmedabad	Gujarat
Virudhunagar Junction	4	Madurai	Tamil Nadu
Visavadar Junction	3	Bhavnagar	Gujarat
Visakhapatnam Junction	3	Waltair	Andhra Pradesh
Vizianagaram Junction	3	Waltair	Andhra Pradesh
Vriddhachalam Junction	4	Tiruchirappalli	Tamil Nadu
Wadi Junction	3	Solapur	Karnataka
Wardha Junction	4	Nagpur CR	Maharashtra
Yerraguntla Junction	3	Guntakal	Andhra Pradesh
Yesvantpur Junction	3	Bangalore	Karnataka
Zafarabad Junction	4	Lucknow NER	Uttar Pradesh
