= Hirakhand Express =

Train in India

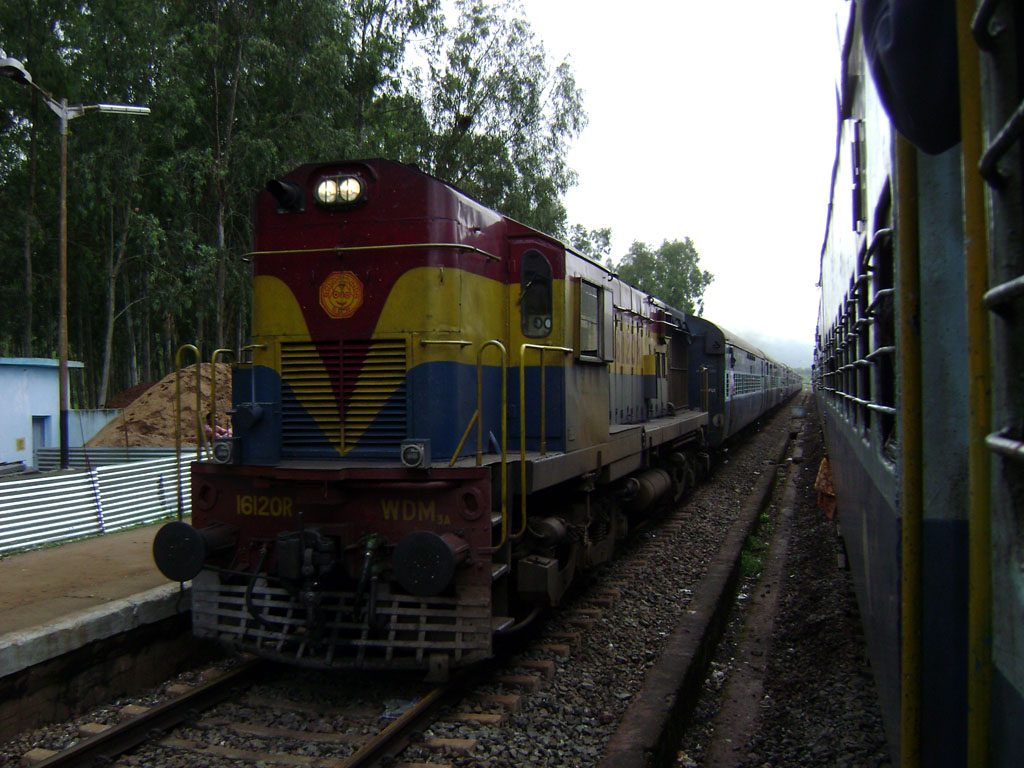
- Hirakhand Express at Tikiri

Overview
- Service type: Daily Train
- Locale: Chhattisgarh, Orissa, Andhra Pradesh
- Current operator: East Coast Railway

Route
- Termini: Jagdalpur; Bhubaneswar
- Stops: 37
- Distance travelled: 786 km (488 mi)
- Average journey time: 17 hours 55 minutes
- Service frequency: Daily
- Train number: 18447 / 18448

On-board services
- Classes: AC2 tier, AC3 tier, sleeper class and General sitting
- Seating arrangements: Yes
- Sleeping arrangements: Yes
- Catering facilities: No, Self-service, E-catering available
- Entertainment facilities: Nil
- Baggage facilities: Under the Seats

Technical
- Rolling stock: LHB coach
- Track gauge: 1,676 mm (5 ft 6 in) (Broad Gauge)
- Operating speed: Avg.43 km/h (27 mph) with halts Maximum 89 km/h (55 mph)
Route map
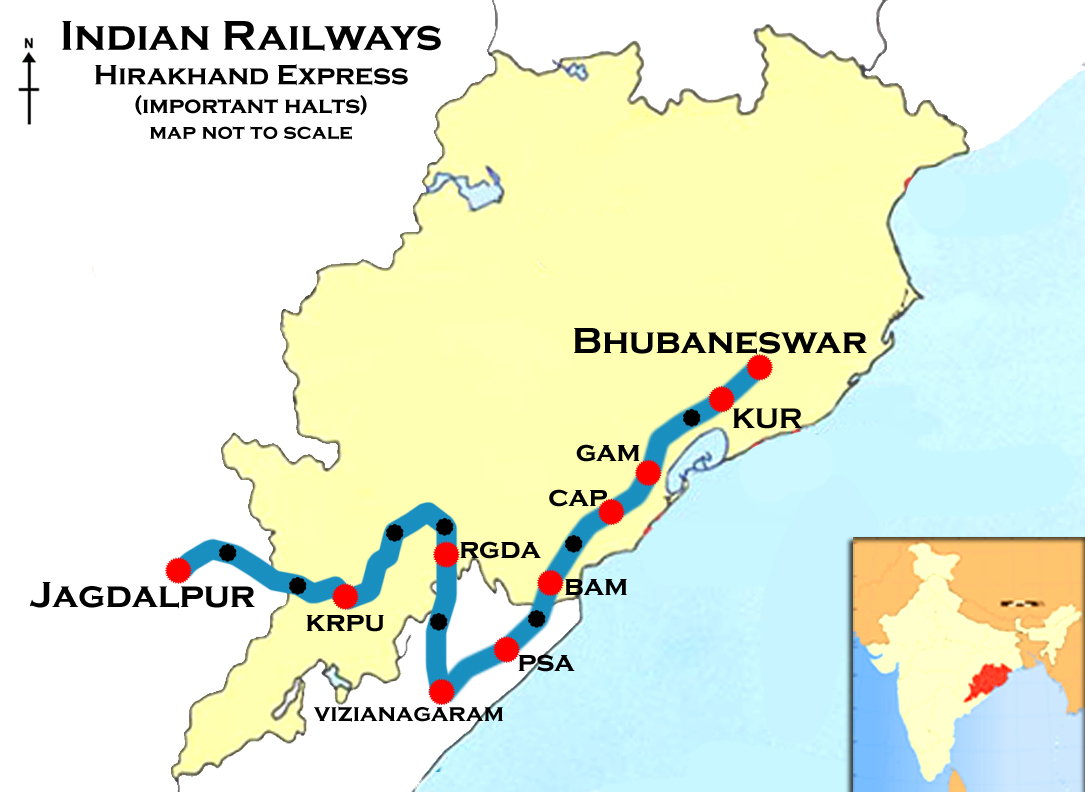

Hirakhand Express is a daily express train which runs between Jagdalpur and Bhubaneswar. It was initially introduced between Sambalpur and Balangir. This train has seen several extension on both the ends and now running in a completely different route than its initial station of origin. First it was extended to run between Rourkela and Titlagarh, then between Rourkela and Rayagada, then between Rourkela and Bhubaneswar via Vijayanagaram but after completion of the Koraput-Rayagada link line connecting Jharsuguda-Vizianagaram line with Kothavalasa-Kirandul line, it was diverted to run between Koraput to Bhubaneswar. In 2010, it was further extended until Jagdalpur. It is operated by the East Coast Railway Zone of Indian Railways.

== Etymology ==
Hirakhand means a piece of diamond in Sambalpuri language spoken in Western Orissa. It is named after the medieval period kingdom of Hirakhand otherwise known as Sambalpur State spread across present Western Orissa and parts of Chhattisgarh state.

== Schedule ==
The 18447 Hirakhand Express leaves Bhubaneswar every day at 1935 hrs IST and reaches Jagdalpur at 1100 hrs IST the next day. The 18448 Hirakhand Express leaves Jagdalpur every day at 1630 hrs IST and reaches Bhubaneswar at 0825 hrs IST on next day.

== Stoppages ==
The major stoppages are Jeypore, Koraput Junction, Rayagada, Parvathipuram railway station, Bobbili Junction Vizianagaram Junction, Srikakulam Road, Palasa, Brahmapur and Khurda Road Junction.

== Slip route ==
On 11 August 2012, a "slip route" of Hirakhand Express was Inaugurated as "Junagarh Road-Bhubaneswar Link Express" (Train Number-18437/18438). The source of this train is Junagarh Road near Bhawanipatna. It leaves Bhawanipatna at 1855 hrs IST daily and arrives at 0825 hrs IST daily. The train amalgamates/bifurcates at Rayagada with/from the main Jagdalpur Hirakhand Express. This train halts at Depur PH, G.Ramchandrapur, Lanjigarh Road Junction, Ambodala, Muniguda, Bissam Cuttack and Therubali before/after Rayagada.

== Traction ==
As the route is electrified, it is hauled by a VSKP-based WAP-7 electric locomotive from Bhubaneswar to Jagdalpur and vice versa with LHB Coaches. Earlier It had a slip separated at Rayagada railway station and using a VSKP based WDG 3A to Junagarh Road and Bhawanipatna from Rayagada but now it's a complete single running train.
