= Visakhapatnam–Koraput Intercity Express =

Train route in Odisha, India

Visakhapatnam - Koraput Intercity Express
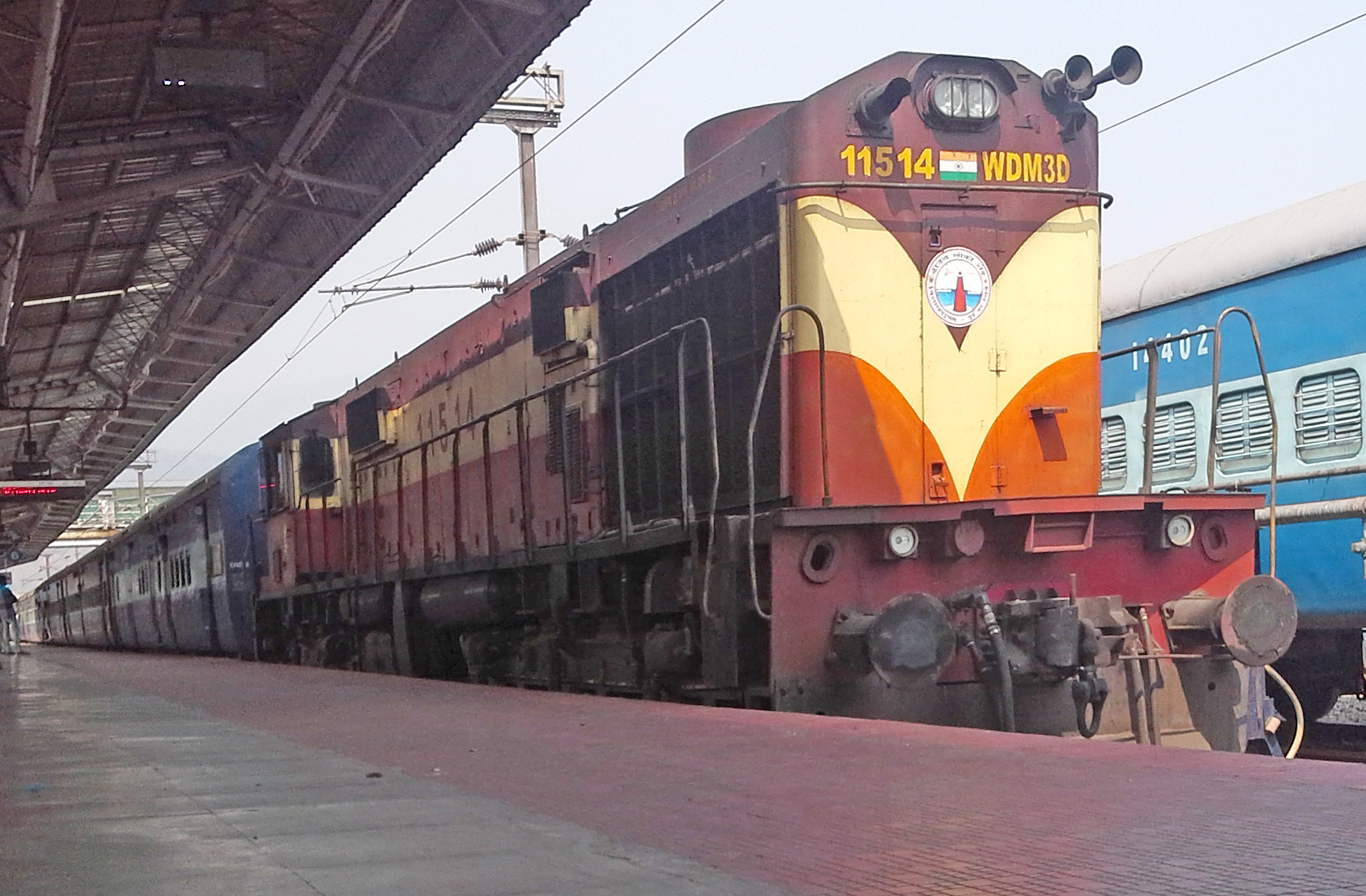
- Koraput Intercity express arrives at Visakhapatnam with a WDM3D loco

Overview
- Service type: Express
- Locale: Andhra Pradesh, Odisha
- First service: 24 March 2012
- Current operator: South Coast Railway

Route
- Termini: Visakhapatnam; Koraput
- Stops: 9
- Distance travelled: 359 km (223 mi)
- Average journey time: 7 hours 25 minutes (average)
- Service frequency: Bi-Weekly
- Train number: 18511 / 18512

On-board services
- Class: General Unreserved
- Seating arrangements: Yes
- Sleeping arrangements: Yes
- Catering facilities: No
- Observation facilities: Standard Indian Railways coaches
- Baggage facilities: Under the seats

Technical
- Rolling stock: Rake sharing 18411/18412 Visakhapatnam - Bhubaneshwar intercity Express
- Track gauge: 1,676 mm (5 ft 6 in)
- Operating speed: 110 km/h (68 mph) maximum 48 km/h (30 mph), including halts
Route map
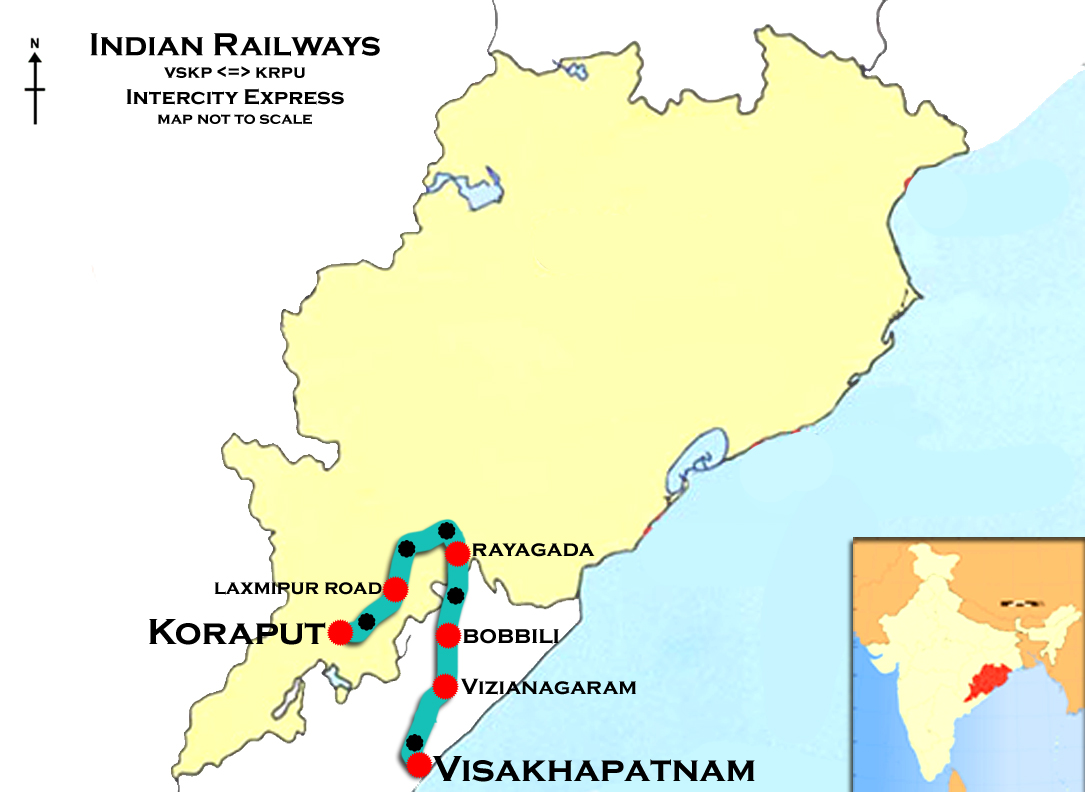

Visakhapatnam–Koraput Intercity Express runs between Visakhapatnam City in Andhra Pradesh and Koraput in Odisha. The train runs through Vizianagaram, Rayagada and Damanjodi. It is numbered 18511/18512 by Indian Railways. The train is maintained by East Coast Railway Zone. The train is hauled by a WDM-3A locomotive of the Visakhapatnam shed.

== Time Table ==
18511- Koraput to Visakhapatnam

Station Code	Station Name
KRPU	Koraput Jn.
DMNJ	Damanjodi
LKMR	Lakshmipur Road
TKRI	Tikiri
SPRD	Singapur Road
RGDA	Rayagada
PVP	Parvatipuram
VBL	Bobbili Jn.
VZM	Vizianagaram Jn.
SCM	Simhachalam
VSKP	Visakhapatnam Jn.

18512- Visakhapatnam to Koraput

Station Code	Station Name
VSKP	Visakhapatnam Jn.
SCM	Simhachalam
VZM	Vizianagaram Jn.
VBL	Bobbili Jn.
PVP	Parvatipuram
RGDA	Rayagada
SPRD	Singapur Road
TKRI	Tikiri
LKMR	Lakshmipur Road
DMNJ	Damanjodi
KRPU	Koraput Jn.

== Coaches ==
The rake composition is SLR, UR, UR, D1, UR, UR, UR, UR, UR, SLR making a total 10 coaches Koraput Junction to Visakhapatnam Junction 18512 Visakhapatnam Junction to Koraput Junction.

This train has Rake Sharing Arrangement with 18411/18412 Visakhapatnam-Bhubaneswar Intercity Express.

Loco	1	2	3	4	5	6	7	8	9	10
	SLR	UR	UR	UR	UR	UR	UR	UR	UR	SLR
