= Moniya =

- village

Area
  - Total: 1,276.06 ha (3,153.2 acres)
- Elevation: 144 m (472 ft)

Population
  - Total: 5,530
- Time zone: IST (UTC+5:30)
- Postal code: 362120
- Area code: 02873

Moniya is a small village in Visavadar Taluka, Junagadh District of Gujarat State, India.

It is 33 kilometers (21 mi) east of district headquarters Junagadh, and 334 km (208 mi) from the state capital Gandhinagar.

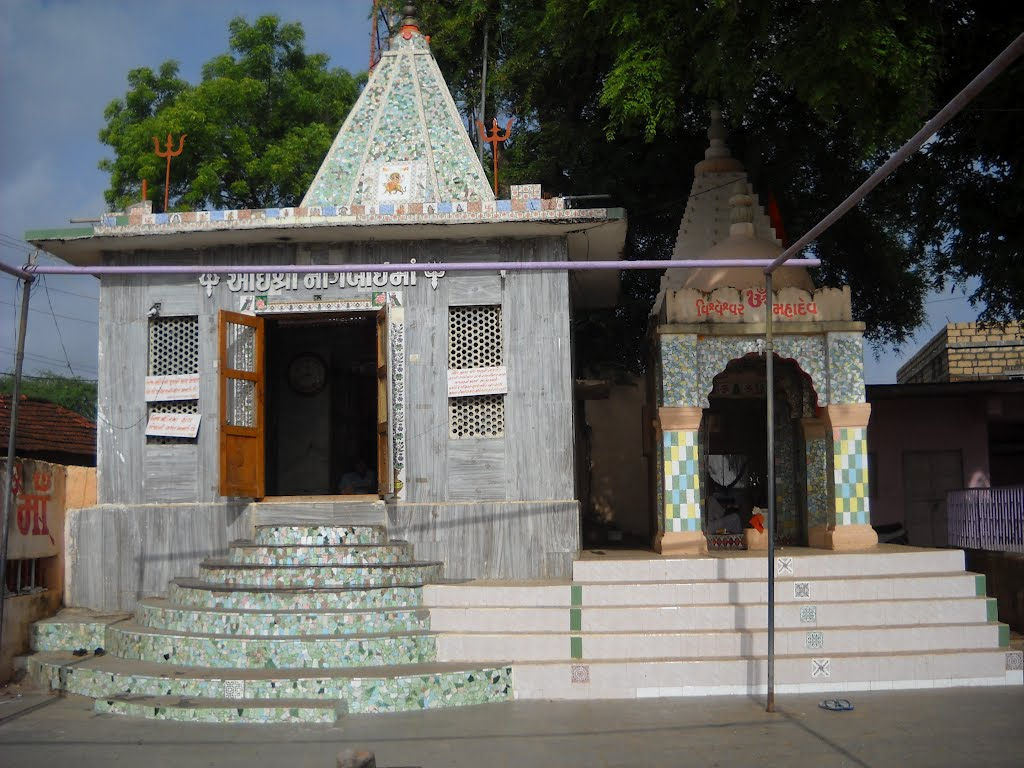
Nagbai mataji temple in Moniya

== See also ==
- Sarsai (Near By Moniya)
- Visavadar
- Somnath
- veraval Gujarat
