= Junction Railroad =

Junction Railroad may refer to:

- Junction (rail), railway track interchange
  - List of railway junction stations in India
- Junction Railroad (Buffalo, NY), part of The New York Central Railroad
- Junction Railroad (Philadelphia), part of the Pennsylvania Railroad system
- Junction Railway (Ohio), part of the Lake Shore and Michigan Southern Railway
