= Prachi =

Prachi is an Indian feminine given name. Notable people and places with the name include:

- Prachi Desai
- Prachi Tehlan
- Prachi Save Saathi
- Prachi Garg
- Prachi Mishra
- Prachi Patankar
- Prachi Thakker
- Prachi Sinha
- Prachi Deshpande
- Prachi River
- Prachi, Gujarat
