= KJV (disambiguation) =

The King James Version (KJV) is a 1611 English language translation of the Bible.

KJV or kjv can also refer to:

- Austrian Communist Youth Association, former youth association in Austria founded in 1918
- Kajkavian, South Slavic supradialect spoken in Croatia
- Karljohansvern, a naval base in Horten, Norway that formerly served as the headquarters for the Royal Norwegian Navy
- Kartell Jüdischer Verbindungen, organization formed in Germany in 1914
- Khijadiya Junction railway station, in Khijadiya, Gujarat, India
