= Laxminarayan Temple, Therubali =

Hindu temple in India

Laxminarayan temple
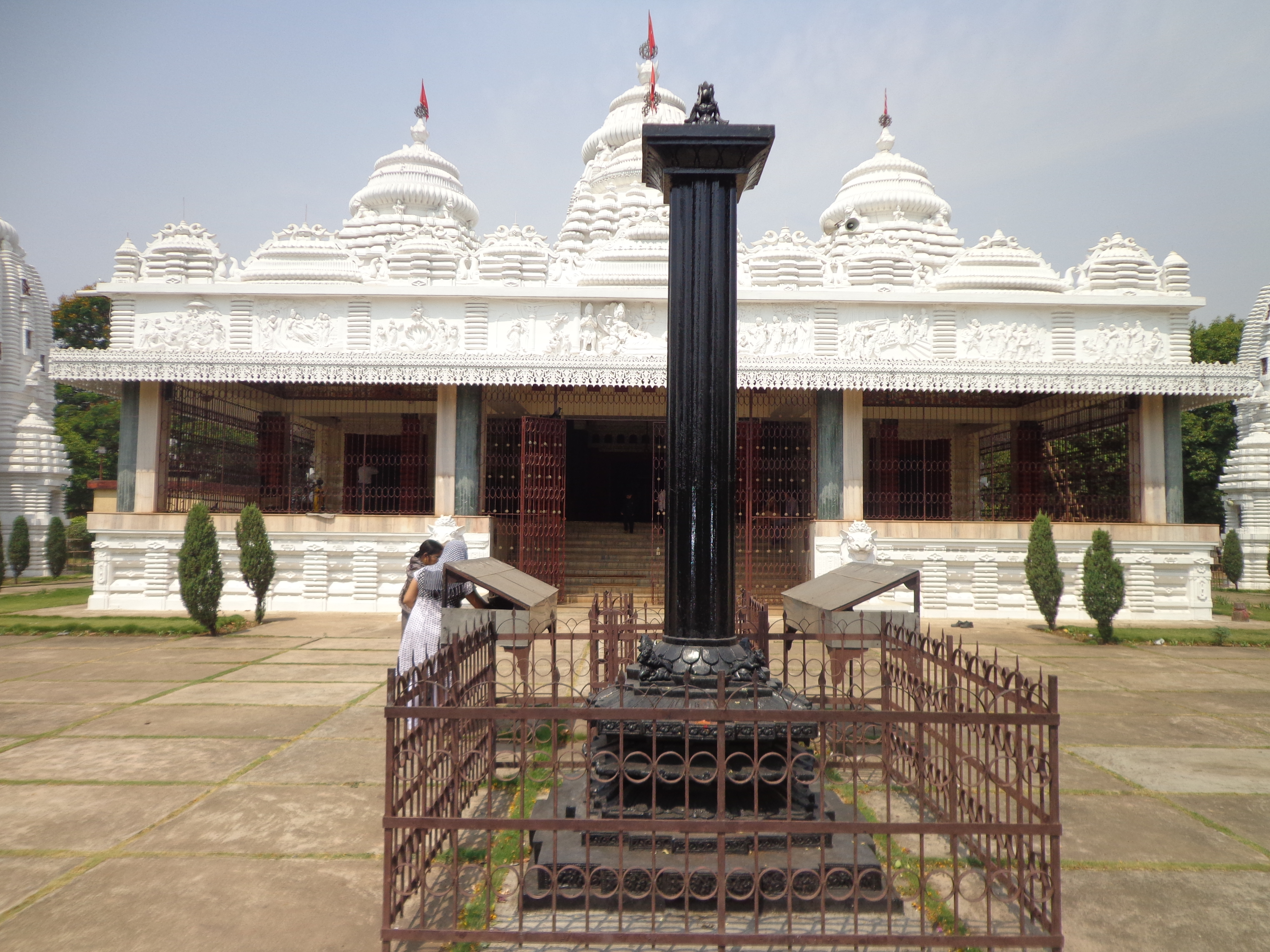

- Location in Odisha

Religion
- Affiliation: Hinduism
- Deity: Lord Vishnu

Location
- Location: Therubali
- State: Odisha
- Country: India
- Interactive map of Laxminarayan temple
- Coordinates: 19°19′37″N 83°26′20″E

Laxminarayan temple is located at IMFA factory of Therubali, Rayagada district, Odisha. The deities Laxminarayan, Hanuman, Lord Jagannath, Balabhadra, Subhadra and Lord Siva are worshiped by thousands of devotees.

== History ==
Built over 14 years back by the IMFA, the temple is a major attraction of the district.

== Tourism ==
The temple is about 25 km from the district headquarters. It is one of the tourist attractions of the district. Visitors and devotees visit this place especially more on Tuesdays .
