= Lanjigarh Road Junction railway station =

Railway Station in Odisha, India

Lanjigarh Road Junction

General information
- Location: Lanjigarh, Odisha; India
- Coordinates: 19°56′39″N 83°24′04″E
- System: Indian Railways station
- Owner: Ministry of Railways, Indian Railways
- Lines: Jharsuguda–Vizianagaram line Lanjigarh–Junagarh section
- Platforms: 2
- Tracks: 2

Construction
- Structure type: Standard (on ground)
- Parking: No

Other information
- Status: Functioning
- Station code: LJR
- Zone(s): East Coast Railway
- Division(s): Sambalpur
Location
- Location within India Location within Odisha

Lanjigarh Road Junction railway station is a railway station on the East Coast Railway network in the state of Odisha, India. It serves Lanjigarh town. Its code is LJR. It has four platforms. Passenger, Express trains halt at Lanjigarh Road Junction railway station.

== Major trains ==
- Sambalpur–Rayagada Intercity Express
- Tapaswini Express
- Bhubaneswar–Junagarh Express

== Passenger Trains ==
- Junagarh Road-Sambalpur Special Express
- Junagarh Road-Raipur Junction Special Express

== See also ==
- Kalahandi district
