= Therubali railway station =

Railway station in Odisha, India

Therubali

General information
- Location: Therubali, Odisha; India
- Coordinates: 19°20′07″N 83°25′15″E
- System: Indian Railways station
- Owner: Ministry of Railways, Indian Railways
- Line: Jharsuguda–Vizianagaram line
- Platforms: 2
- Tracks: 2

Construction
- Structure type: Standard (on ground)
- Parking: No

Other information
- Status: Functioning
- Station code: THV
- Zone(s): East Coast Railway
- Division(s): Sambalpur
Location
- Location within India Location within Odisha

Therubali railway station is a railway station on the East Coast Railway network in the state of Odisha, India. It serves Therubali village. Its code is THV. It has two platforms. Passenger, Express and Superfast trains halt at Therubali railway station.

== Major trains ==
- Korba–Visakhapatnam Express
- Dhanbad–Alappuzha Express
- Bilaspur–Tirupati Express
- Samata Express
- Samaleshwari Express
- Sambalpur–Rayagada Intercity Express

== See also ==
- Rayagada district
