= Rampara, Gir Somnath district =

Rampara (Gir)
- Village
- Location in Gujarat, India Rampara (Gir) (India)
- Coordinates: 20°58′34″N 70°38′55″E
- Country: India
- State: Gujarat
- District: Gir Somnath
- Elevation: 1,500 m (4,900 ft)

Population (Patel)
  - Total: 1,178

Languages
  - Official: Gujarati (State), Hindi (Federal)
- Time zone: UTC+5:30 (IST)
- PIN: 362140
- Telephone code: 02876
- Vehicle registration: GJ32
- Talala (Gir): Gir Somnath
- Climate: Dry almost (Köppen)
- Website: gujaratindia.com

Rampara Gir is a village in the area of Talala district Gir Somnath of the state of Gujarat in India. It is surrounded by the gir forest. Locals also calls state of Mango and Lion. In Gujarati, "કેસર અને કેસરી". Kesar is famous variety of mango and Kesari refer to Asiatic Lions.
