= Sarupsar Junction railway station =

Railway station in Rajasthan, India

Sarupsar Junction

General information
- Location: Sarupsar, Shri Ganganagar district, Rajasthan; India
- Coordinates: 29.354775°N 73.700671°E
- Elevation: 165 metres (541 ft)
- System: Indian Railways station
- Owner: Indian Railways
- Operator: North Western Railway
- Lines: Suratgarh–Shri Ganganagar line Anupgarh–Sarupsar line
- Platforms: 2
- Tracks: 2

Construction
- Structure type: Standard (on ground station)
- Parking: No

Other information
- Status: Functioning
- Station code: SRPR
- Zone(s): North Western Railway
- Division(s): Bikaner
Location
- Location within India Location within Rajasthan

Sarupsar Junction railway station is a railway station in Shri Ganganagar district, Rajasthan. Its code is SRPR. It serves Sarupsar village. The station consists of 2 platforms. Passenger trains halt here.
