= Prachi, Gujarat =

Village in Gujarat, India

Coordinates: 20.920176°N 70.608938°E

Prachi is a village in Sutrapada taluka, Gir Somnath district, Gujarat, India. Prachi is a historical place, described in Hindu scriptures Prabhas Puran and Padma Puran.

Prachi is situated along National Highway 8E. The village is served by Prachi Road Junction railway station which comes under Western Railway. The railway station is situated 12 km away at Panikotha village in Talala taluka.
