= Junagarh Road railway station =

Railway station in Kalahandi district, Odisha

Junagarh Road
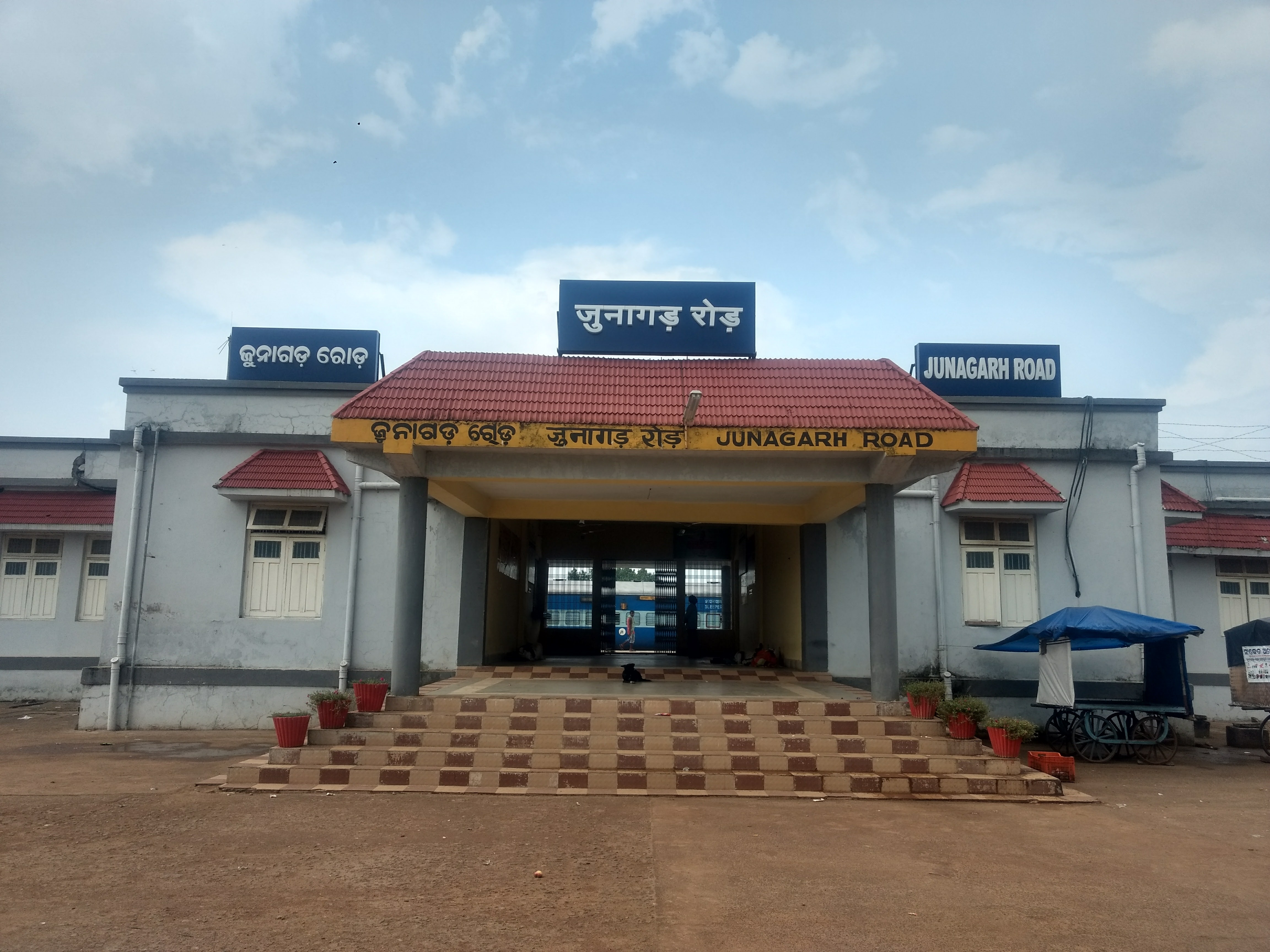

General information
- Location: Khuruguda road, Junagarh, Odisha; India
- Coordinates: 19°31′23″N 82°34′37″E
- Elevation: 217 m (712 ft)
- System: Indian Railways terminal station
- Owner: Indian Railways
- Operator: East Coast Railway
- Line: Lanjigarh–Junagarh section
- Platforms: 1
- Tracks: 2

Other information
- Status: Functioning
- Station code: JNRD
- Zone(s): East Coast Railway
- Division(s): Sambalpur

History
- Opened: 3 March 2014

Services
Preceding station	Indian Railways	Following station
Bhawanipatna towards ?	East Coast Railway zone Lanjigarh–Junagarh section	Terminus
Location
- Location within Odisha Location within India

Junagarh Road railway station is a terminus station belonging to Indian Railways in Kalahandi district of Odisha State in India.

== History ==
The proposal for a Lanjigarh–Junagarh line came in 1991, when Bhakta Charan Das was the state railway minister. The line was announced in the rail budget of 1992. After nearly twenty years, the line was completed in 2011, and Bhawanipatna railway station was opened by Das on 11 August 2012. On the same day, the first Bhawanipatna–Bhubaneshwar link express started from Bhawanipatna.

== Opened ==
The Lanjigarh–Junagarh section was completed by 2 March 2014 and the Bhubaneswar–Bhawanipatna Express was extended to Junagarh. Junagarh railway station was inaugurated by Minister of State for Railways Adhir Ranjan Chowdhury in the presence of Bhakta Charan Das on 3 March 2014.

== Future plans ==
There are plans by the Government of Odisha and Indian Railways to extend the existing Lanjigarh–Junagarh line to Jeypore on Kothavalasa–Kirandul line, and further to Malkangiri and Bhadrachalam in Telangana. Survey work is being planned for this purpose.
