= Talala Junction railway station =

Railway Station in Gujarat, India

General information
- Location: Talala, Gir Somnath district India
- Coordinates: 21°02′32″N 70°31′22″E
- Elevation: 86 m (282 ft)
- System: Indian Railway Station
- Owner: Ministry of Railways, Indian Railways
- Operator: Western Railway
- Lines: Veraval - Amreli line Veraval - Delvada line
- Platforms: 1
- Tracks: 1

Construction
- Structure type: Standard (On Ground)
- Parking: No

Other information
- Status: Functioning
- Station code: TAV
- Zone(s): Western Railway
- Division(s): Bhavnagar
Location
- Location within Gujarat

Talala Junction railway station is a railway station on the Western Railway network in the state of Gujarat, India. Talala Junction railway station is 25 km (16 mi) far away from Veraval Junction railway station. Passenger trains halt here.

== Major trains ==
- 52929/52930 Amreli - Veraval MG Passenger (UnReserved)
- 52933/52946 Amreli - Veraval MG Passenger (UnReserved)
- 52949/52950 Delvada - Veraval MG Passenger (UnReserved)
- 52951/52952 Delvada - Junagadh MG Passenger (UnReserved)
