= Bhawanipatna railway station =

Railway Station in Odisha, India

Bhawanipatna
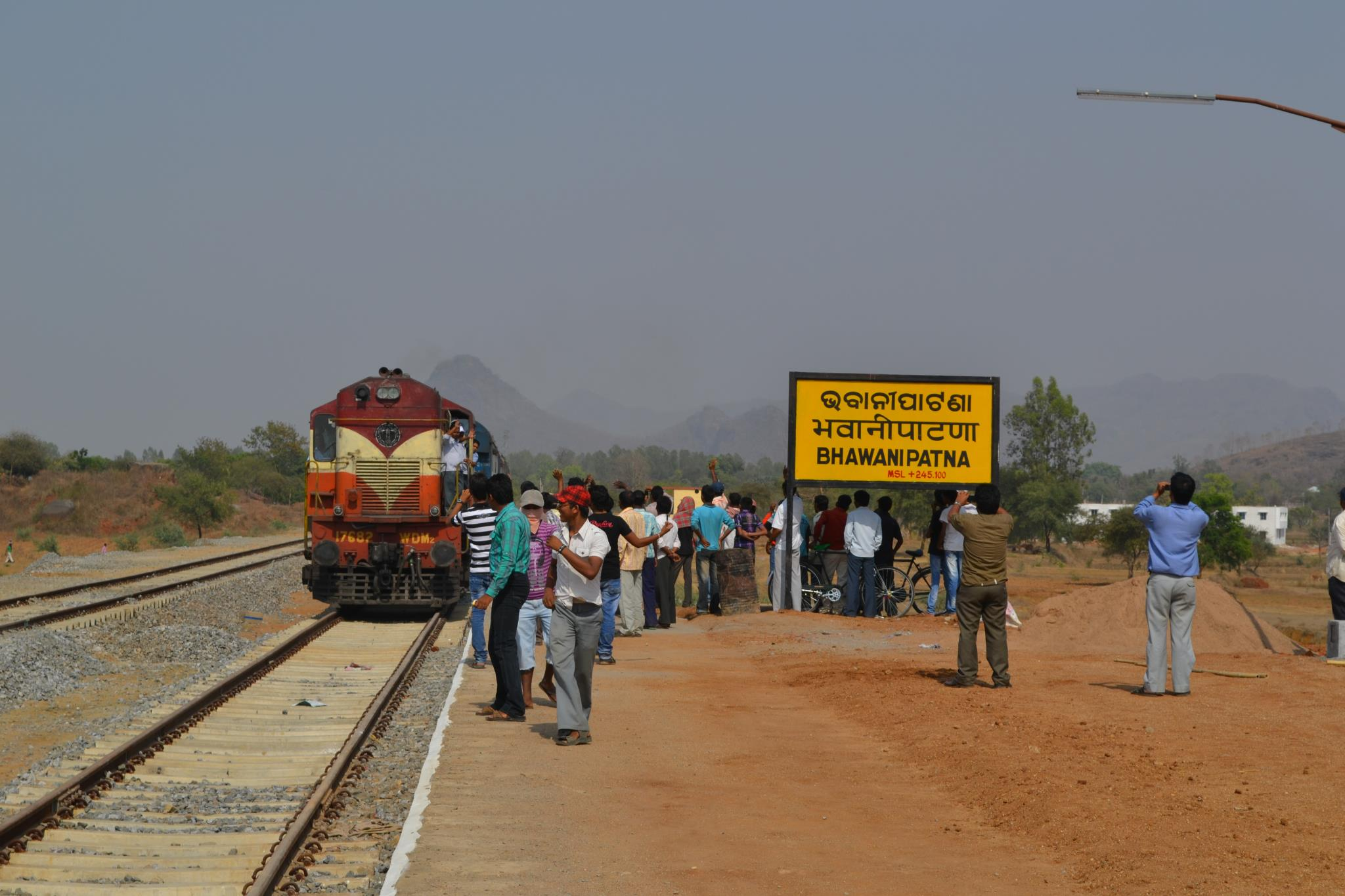

General information
- Location: SH-16, Parmanandapur, Bhawanipatna, Odisha; India
- Coordinates: 19°33′09″N 83°54′50″E
- Elevation: 241 m (791 ft)
- System: Regional rail and Light rail station
- Owner: Indian Railways
- Operator: East Coast Railway
- Line: Lanjigarh–Junagarh section
- Platforms: 1
- Tracks: 2

Construction
- Parking: Available

Other information
- Status: Functioning
- Station code: BWIP
- Zone(s): East Coast Railway
- Division(s): Sambalpur Railway Division

History
- Opened: 11 August 2012; 14 years ago

Services
Preceding station	Indian Railways	Following station
Depur P.H towards ?	East Coast Railway zone Lanjigarh–Junagarh section	Junagarh towards ?
Location
- Location within Odisha Location within India

Bhawanipatna railway station is a railway station located in Kalahandi district of Odisha State.

== History ==
The Lanjigarh–Junagarh railway line was proposed in 1991 and announced in the 1992 Railway Budget. Construction was completed in 2011. Bhawanipatna railway station, part of the line, was inaugurated on 11 August 2012 by former Minister of State for Railways, Bhakta Charan Das. The first train Bhawanipatna–Bhubaneshwar link express started from Bhawanipatna. A passenger train was extended to Bhawanipatna from Kesinga on 12 August 2012.
