= Kanhan Junction railway station =

Railway Station in Maharashtra, India

Kanhan Junction

General information
- Location: Kanhan (Pipri), Maharashtra; India
- Coordinates: 21°13′30″N 79°14′13″E
- Elevation: 285 metres (935 ft)
- System: Express train and Passenger train station
- Platforms: 3
- Tracks: Double Electric-Line

Construction
- Structure type: Standard (on-ground station)

Other information
- Status: Functioning
- Station code: KNHN
- Zone(s): South East Central Railway
- Division(s): Nagpur SEC
Location
- Location within India Location within Maharashtra

Kanhan Junction railway station (station code: KNHN) is a junction railway station in Nagpur SEC railway division of South East Central Railway Zone of Indian Railways. It serves Kanhan (Pipri) is a census town in Nagpur District in the Indian state of Maharashtra.
