= Singapur Road Junction railway station =

Railway station in Odisha, India

Singapur Road Junction

General information
- Location: Jaykaypur, Odisha; India
- Coordinates: 19°15′30″N 83°24′10″E
- Elevation: 248 m (814 ft)
- System: Indian Railways junction station
- Owner: Indian Railways
- Operator: East Coast Railway
- Lines: Raipur–Vizianagaram main line Rayagada–Koraput branch line
- Platforms: 4
- Tracks: 6

Construction
- Structure type: Standard on ground
- Parking: Yes
- Cycle facilities: No

Other information
- Status: Functioning
- Station code: SPRD
- Division(s): Rayagada

History
- Opened: 1931
- Rebuilt: 2023
- Former names: Bengal Nagpur Railway
Location
- Location within Odisha Location within India

Singapur Road Junction is a junction station near Rayagada in Odisha where Koraput–Rayagada railway line meets Vizianagaram–Raipur mainline.

== The railway station ==
Singapur Road Junction railway station of East Coast Railway is located at an elevation of 248 m. It has the station code of SPRD and is under the jurisdiction of Waltair railway division. It contains two railway platforms.

== History ==
The Parvatipuram–Raipur line was completed in 1931, while the Koraput–Rayagada Rail Link Project was completed on 31 December 1998.

Preceding station	Indian Railways	Following station
Therubali towards ?	East Coast Railway zone Jharsuguda–Vizianagaram line	Rayagada towards ?
Terminus	East Coast Railway zone Rayagada–Koraput branch line	Keutguda towards ?
