= Bhubaneswar–Junagarh Express =

Train in India, Running through Odisha and Andhra Pradesh

Bhubaneswar-Junagarh Road Express
Overview
- Service type: Superfast Express
- Locale: Odisha & Andhra Pradesh
- First service: 11 August 2012; 13 years ago
- Current operator: East Coast Railway

Route
- Termini: Bhubaneswar (BBS); Junagarh Road (JNRD)
- Stops: 17
- Distance travelled: 655 km (407 mi)
- Average journey time: 11 hours 35 minutes
- Service frequency: Daily
- Train number: 20837 / 20838

On-board services
- Classes: AC 2 Tier, AC 3 Tier, Sleeper Class, General Unreserved
- Disabled access: Disabled access
- Seating arrangements: Yes
- Sleeping arrangements: Yes
- Catering facilities: E-catering
- Observation facilities: Large windows
- Baggage facilities: No
- Other facilities: Below the seats

Technical
- Rolling stock: LHB coach
- Track gauge: 1,676 mm (5 ft 6 in)
- Operating speed: 57 km/h (35 mph) average including halts.
Route map
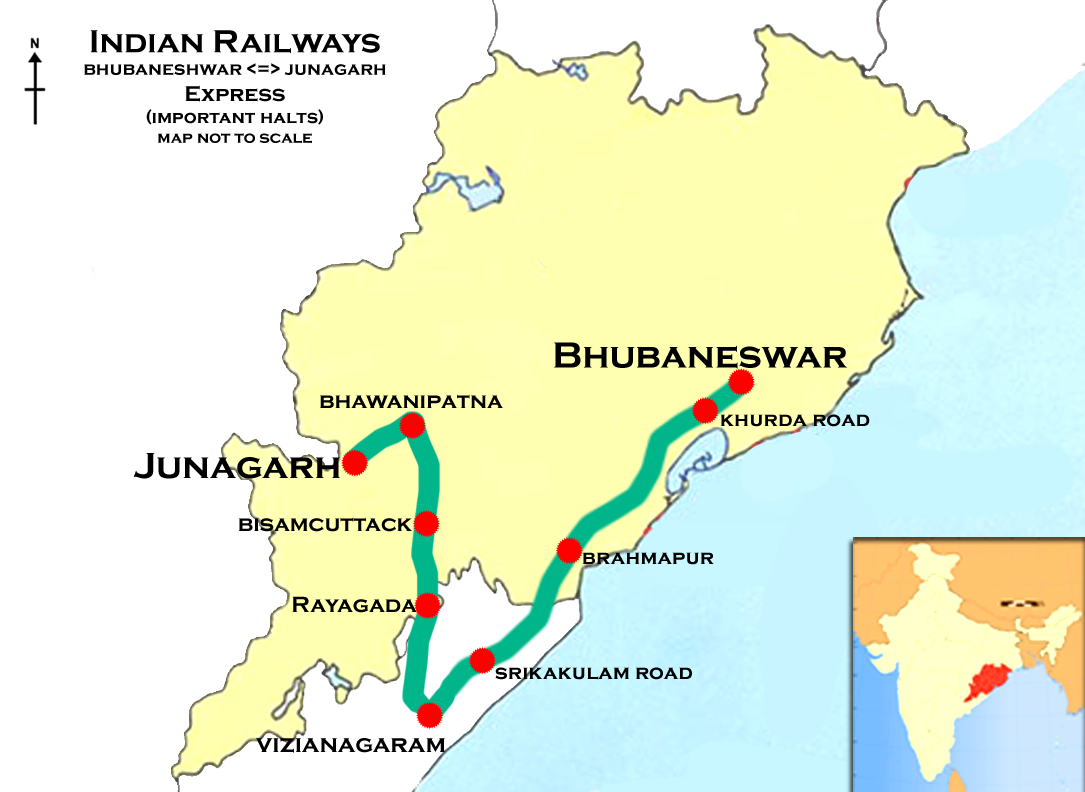

The 20837 / 20838 Bhubaneswar–Junagarh Road Express is a superfast express train belonging to Indian Railways that runs between Bhubaneswar and Junagarh Road as a daily service. Although both termini are in the state of Odisha, it has an intermediate stop at Vizianagaram in Andhra Pradesh. It is maintained by East Coast Railway zone. It operates as train number 18437 from Bhubaneswar to Junagarh and as train number 18438 in the reverse direction, but is announced as 20837 and 20838 respectively.

== History ==
Bhawanipatna–Bhubaneshwar link express started from Bhawanipatna on 11 August 2012. Later it was extended to Junagarh on 2 March 2014. It was the first train connecting to Bhawanipatna railway station.

== Coaches ==
It consists of one combined 2AC and 3AC (AB), three 3AC, five sleeper, one sleeper extra (SE), four general second, two guard cum luggage vans, and one SLRD. The total composition is 17 coaches.
