= Sarupsar =

Sarupsar is a place in Ganganagar district of Rajasthan.

Sarupsar Junction (IR Station code SRPR) is an important railway junction station under Ajmer division of North Western Railway zone of Indian Railways.

It connects Sri Ganganagar Junction on north direction, Anupgarh on West direction, Suratgarh Junction on east direction.
