= Prachi Garg =

Indian academic and author

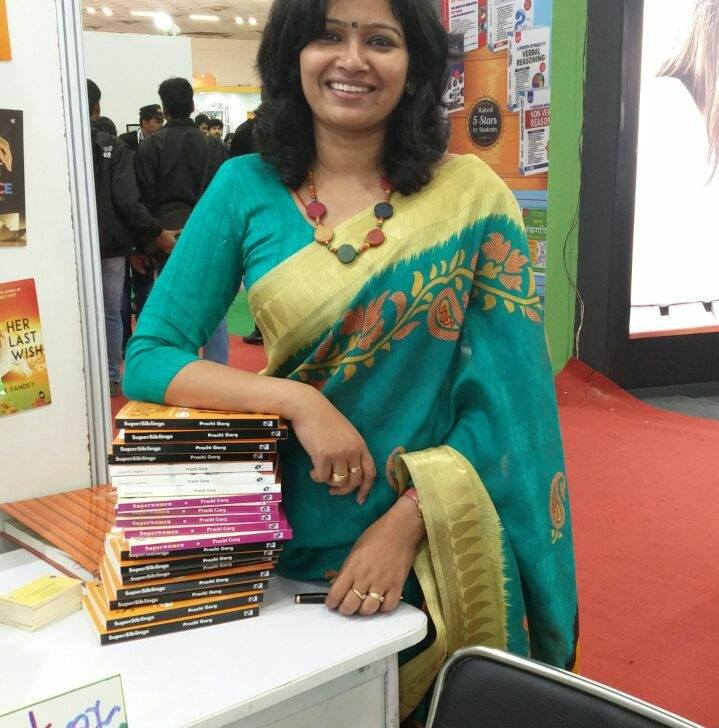
- Prachi Garg
- Born: 19 May 1984 (age 42); Bulandshahr, Uttar Pradesh, India
- Occupation: Author

Prachi Garg; born 19 May 1984) is an Indian author columnist, academic speaker, traveler and entrepreneur. Her books "Superwomen", focused on women entrepreneurship and "Supercouples" based on the entrepreneurship endeavors and challenges by couples. Much of her subject or theme is oriented towards entrepreneurship, social issues and development and women empowerment in the context of Indian subcontinent. She combines dreams with realism with facts derived from the practical life.

== Early life, family background and education ==
Prachi Garg was born on 19 May 1984 in Bulandshahr, Uttar Pradesh, in a business family. She is a daughter of Neeru Garg and Brajesh Garg. She has earned a master degree in business administration (MBA) from Great Lakes Institute of Management, Chennai.

== Career and entrepreneurship ==
She has worked as an anchor and news reporter with DD News Journal, freelance journalist with EET India, and has been freelancing for HT Horizons. She is an author.

She owns an enterprise Ghoomophiro. Her start-up has been covered by, Indian Express Femina, iDiva. She does trekking and organizes women guided tours.

In 2025, she was the exhibition chair for ICCCNT 2025, held at Indore.

== Writing career ==
- Superwomen. The book, a collection of biographies, narrates the entrepreneurial journeys and struggles therein of 20 women from the Indian subcontinent. It depicts how these women played all their roles to perfection, aligning their families with their ambitions, showing the world their true mettle
- Supercouples. The book, a collection of biographies.
- Supersiblings. Her latest book focuses on siblings who've established themselves as entrepreneurs together and how their relationship has nurtured during that course.
- "Legends of the startup guy". The book was launched in March and is about how a young guy Ganesh starts his business. It is a mix of Indian mythology and business lessons.
- "Startup Secrets from the Ramayana". The book that has startup lessons from Ramayana.
- "Kakori: The Train Robbery that shook the British Raj". In this book, she puts together the events that led to the fateful incident.

== Awards ==
- Received the "Femina Achievers 2025 North" Award
- Received the "Excellence Award at Miranda House
- Received the "Women Disruptor of the year for excellence in Technology
- Received the "Indian Prime Women Icon Award - 2022

== Bibliography ==
- — (2016). Superwomen. Srishti Publishers. ISBN 978-93-82665-63-2.
- — (2017). Supercouples. Srishti Publishers. ISBN 978-93-82665-89-2.
- — (2018). SuperSiblings. Srishti Publishers. ISBN 978-93-87022-10-2.
- — (2019). Legends of a Startup Guy. Srishti Publishers. ISBN 978-93-87022-54-6.
- — (2020). Guardian Angel. Srishti Publishers. ASIN B08CDXX9HL.
- — (2020). Startup Secrets from the Ramayana. Srishti Publishers. ISBN 978-93-87022-83-6.
- — (2020). PenPal is Here. Srishti Publishers. ASIN B08BCG589J.
- — (2020). Connecting the Dots. Srishti Publishers. ASIN B08BCH6B4D.
- — (2020). The Time Machine. Srishti Publishers. ASIN B08C7LL5QJ.
- — (2021). Ganesha's Global Startup. Srishti Publishers. ISBN 978-93-90441-30-3.
- — (2022). Kakori: The Train Robbery That Shook The British Raj. Srishti Publishers. ISBN 978-93-90441-34-1.
- — (2024). Operation Polo: Integration of Hyderabad into India by Sardar Patel. Srishti Publishers. ISBN 978-93-95192-62-0.
- — (2025). Wisdom from the Dashavatara - Leadership Lessons on Startups. Delhi: Om Book International. ISBN 978-93-6395-620-9.
- — (2026). India's Women Scientists: The Power behind the Progress. Delhi: Shrishti Publishers. ISBN 978-93-6411-970-2.
