= Prachi Road Junction railway station =

Railway Station in Gujarat, India

General information
- Location: Panikotha, Talala, Gir Somnath district, Gujarat; India
- Coordinates: 20°58′57″N 70°41′30″E
- Elevation: 98 m (322 ft)
- System: Indian Railway Station
- Owner: Ministry of Railways, Indian Railways
- Operator: Western Railway
- Lines: Veraval–Prachi–Kodinar line Veraval–Prachi–Delvada line
- Platforms: 1
- Tracks: 1

Construction
- Structure type: Standard (On Ground)
- Parking: No

Other information
- Status: Functioning
- Station code: PCC
- Zone(s): Western Railway
- Division(s): Bhavnagar
Location
- Location within Gujarat

Prachi Road Junction railway station is a railway station in the Bhavnagar railway division of the Western Railway. It is a junction railway station on Veraval–Prachi–Kodinar line and Veraval–Prachi–Delvada line. It is located at Panikotha village, Talala taluka, Gir Somnath district, Gujarat, India. It serves Prachi village, located 12 km away, in Sutrapada taluka and surrounding villages. Only passenger trains halt here.

== See also ==
- Western Railway
