= Lanjigarh–Junagarh section =

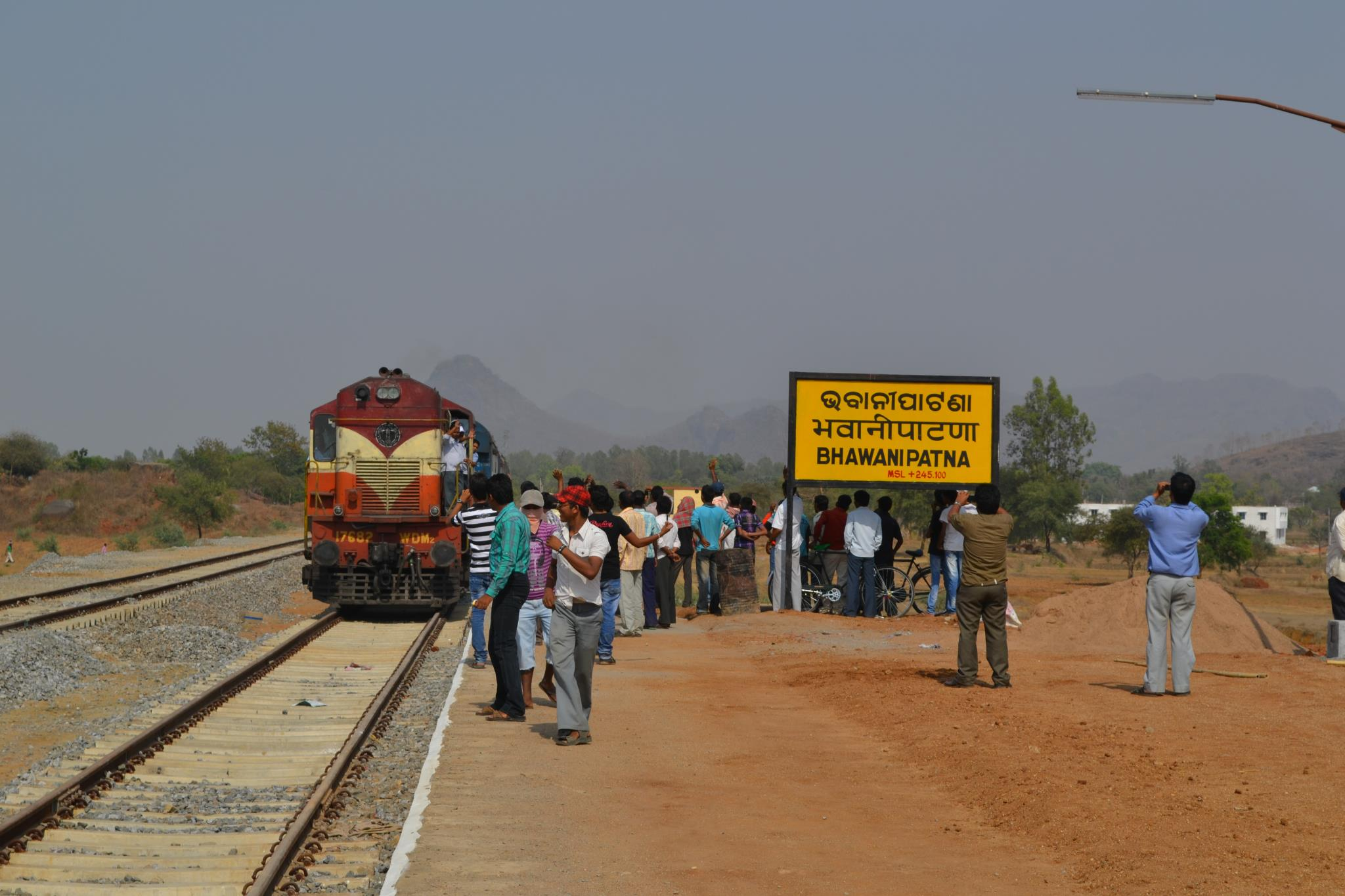
- A passenger train enters Bhawani Patna railway station on Lanjigarh–Junagarh section

Overview
- Status: Operational
- Owner: Indian Railways
- Locale: Odisha
- Termini: Lanjigarh; Junagarh
- Stations: Bhawanipatna

Service
- Operator(s): East Coast Railway

History
- Opened: 2 March 2014

Technical
- Track length: 56 km (35 mi)
- Number of tracks: 1
- Track gauge: 5 ft 6 in (1,676 mm) broad gauge
- Electrification: Yes
- Operating speed: 100 km/h

The Lanjigarh–Junagarh section belongs to the Sambalpur division of East Coast Railway Zone in India.

== Opened ==
The Lanjigarh–Junagarh line was completed in two sections. One up to Bhawanipatna which was completed in 2011. Another one from Bhawanipatna to Junagarh. An engine trial run was done on 5 June 2011 from Lanjigarh to Bhawanipatna. After a year of completion, the rail line opened up to Bhawanipatna on 11 August 2012. On the same day, the first train on this line Bhawanipatna–Bhubaneswar Link Express flagged off by Lok Sabha member and former railway minister Bhakta Charan Das. Bhawanipatna–Junagarh section completion became late due to the non-acquisition of 2.5 km forest land. Bhawanipatna–Junagarh section opened on March 2, 2014.

== New line survey ==
A new line survey for the easy connection of Titlagarh and Junagarh has been made by bypassing Lanjigarh Road. This is an extension of a C-shape curve from G. Ramchandrapur to Norla bypassing Lanjigarh. This will reduce the journey by 30 minutes, otherwise wasted due to the need to rotate the Engine from front to back and back to front at Lanjigarh Road.

A new line survey for Bhawanipatna-Nabarangpur–Jeypore–Malkangiri–Bhadrachalam has been conducted.
