= Bobbili Junction railway station =

Railway station in Andhra Pradesh, India

Bobbili Junction
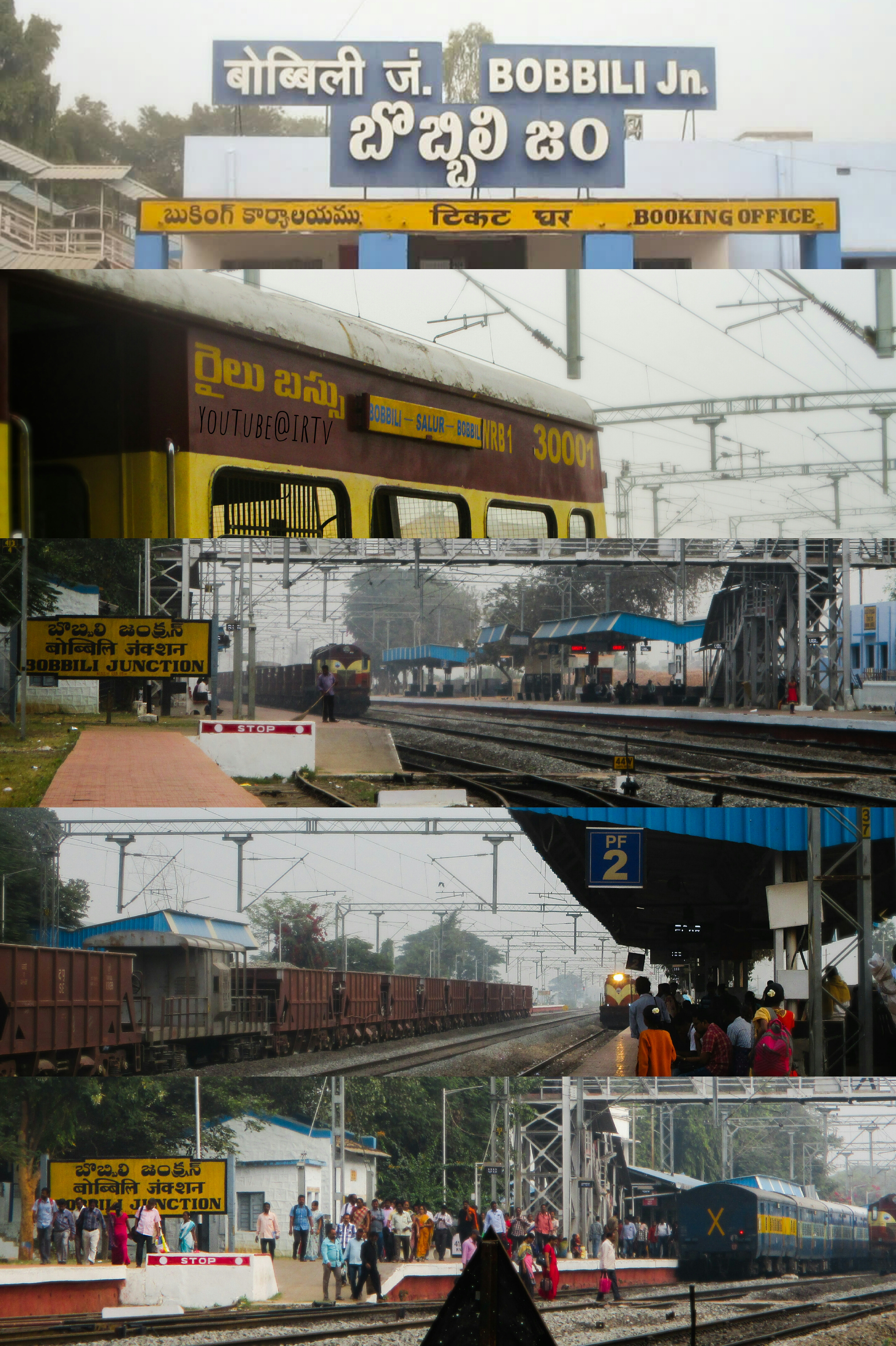
- From top: Station entrance, Salur RailBus, Goods train, Platform 2 Passenger arriving, Samta Express leaving

General information
- Location: Jn. Point Salur/Rayagada/Vizianagaram, Railway Station Rd, Bobbili, Vizianagaram District, Andhra Pradesh; India
- Coordinates: 18°20′38″N 83°12′17″E
- Elevation: 137 m (449 ft)
- System: Indian Railways junction railway station
- Operator: South Coast Railway
- Line: Jharsuguda–Vizianagaram line
- Platforms: 4
- Tracks: 6

Construction
- Structure type: Standard (on-ground station)
- Parking: Yes

Other information
- Status: Functioning
- Station code: VBL
- Zone(s): South Coast Railway
- Division(s): Visakhapatnam

History
- Opened: 1908
- Former names: East Coast Railway, Bengal Nagpur Railway

Services
Preceding station	Indian Railways	Following station
Sitanagaram towards ?	South Coast Railway zone Vizianagaram–Raipur line	Donkinavalasa towards ?
Location
- Location within Andhra Pradesh Location within India

Bobbili Junction railway station (station code:VBL) belongs to South Coast Railway of Visakhapatnam Division. It is located in Vizianagaram district of Andhra Pradesh state.

== History ==
Between 1893 and 1896, 1,288 km (800 mi) of the East Coast State Railway was opened for traffic. In 1898–99, Bengal Nagpur Railway was linked to the lines in southern India. The 79 km (49 mi) Vizianagaram–Parvatipuram line was opened in 1908–09 and an extension to Salur was built in 1913. The Parvatipuram–Raipur line was completed in 1931.

== Railway reorganization ==
The Bengal Nagpur Railway was nationalized in 1944.Eastern Railway was formed on 14 April 1952 with the portion of East Indian Railway Company east of Mughalsarai and the Bengal Nagpur Railway. In 1955, South Eastern Railway was carved out of Eastern Railway. It comprised lines mostly operated by BNR earlier. Amongst the new zones started in April 2003 were East Coast Railway and South East Central Railway. Both these railways were carved out of South Eastern Railway. In 2019 East Coast Railway was bifurcated with Bobbili going to South Coast Railway
