= Therubali =

- village
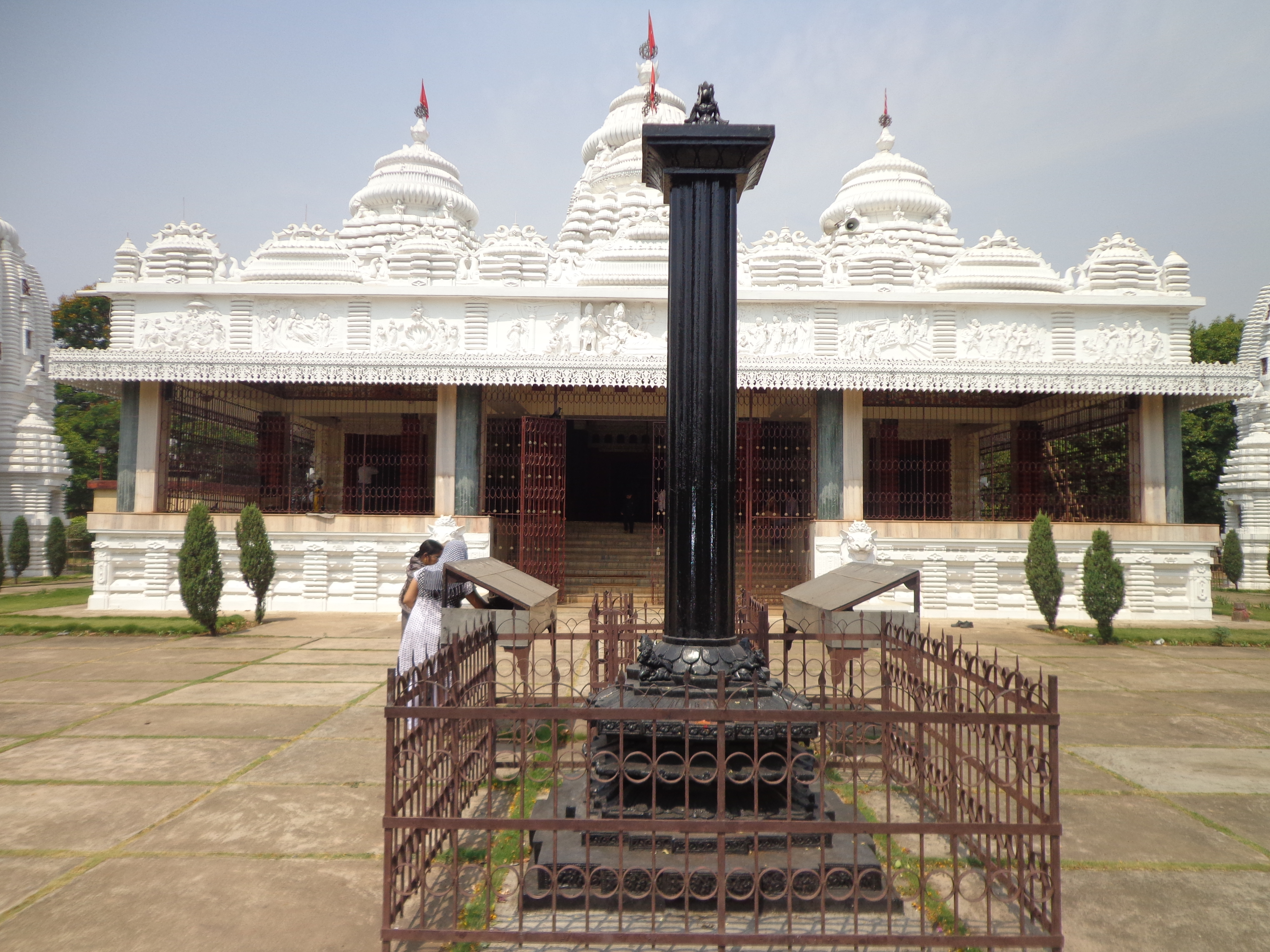
- Laxminarayana Temple at Therubali

- Location in Odisha, India Therubali (India)
- Coordinates: 19°20′13″N 83°25′50″E
- Country: India
- State: Odisha
- District: Rayagada
- Elevation: 248 m (814 ft)

Population (2011)
  - Total: 1,783

Languages
  - Official: Odia
- Time zone: UTC+5:30 (IST)
- Postal code: 765018
- Vehicle registration: OD-18
- Website: odisha.gov.in

Therubali is a village in Rayagada district in the Indian state of Odisha. IMFA's main plant is located at Therubali.

== Demographics ==
In 2011, Therubali had population of 1783 of which male and female were 920 and 863 respectively.

== Geography ==
Therubali is located at 19.33°N 83.43°E. It has an average elevation of 248 metres (813 feet). It is located 21 km towards north of District headquarters Rayagada and 319 km from the state capital Bhubaneswar.

== Economy and tourist interest ==
IMFA Ltd. complex at therubali has a significant contribution to the economy of Rayagada district. The Laxminarayana temple at Therubali is a place of tourist interest of the district. The deities Lord Laxminarayana, Lord Hanuman, Lord jagannath, Balabhadra, Subharda and Lord shiva are worshiped here. Therubali is well equipped with basic educational school which includes :

== Education ==
- Chinmaya Vidyalaya- Private
- Imfal Campus High School-Govt.
- SisuBidyaMandir, Therubali
- Therubali Asrama bidyalaya
- M.E.School
