= Visavadar Junction railway station =

Railway Station in Gujarat, India

General information
- Location: State Highway 111, Visavadar, Gujarat; India
- Coordinates: 21°20′29″N 70°45′20″E
- Elevation: 144 metres (472 ft)
- System: Indian Railways station
- Owner: Indian Railways
- Operator: Western Railway
- Platforms: 2
- Tracks: 5 (Metre Gauge)
- Connections: Auto stand

Construction
- Structure type: Standard (on-ground station)
- Parking: No
- Cycle facilities: No

Other information
- Status: Functioning
- Station code: VSW
- Zone(s): Western Railway
- Division(s): Bhavnagar
Location
- Location within India Location within Gujarat

Visavadar Junction railway station is a small railway station in Junagadh district, Gujarat. Its code is VSW. It serves Visavadar town. The station consists of two platforms. The platforms are not well sheltered. It lacks many facilities including water and sanitation.

== Major trains ==
- 52951/52952 Delvada–Junagadh MG Passenger (unreserved)
- 52929/52930 Amreli–Veraval MG Passenger (unreserved)
- 52933/52946 Amreli–Veraval MG Passenger (unreserved)
- 52955/52956 Amreli–Junagadh MG Passenger (unreserved)
