= Khijadiya Junction railway station =

Railway station in Gujarat, India

General information
- Location: Amreli, Gujarat; India
- Coordinates: 21°44′30″N 71°16′35″E
- Elevation: 127 m (416.7 ft)
- System: Indian Railways station
- Owner: Ministry of Railways, Indian Railways
- Operator: Western Railway

Construction
- Parking: No
- Cycle facilities: No

Other information
- Status: Functioning
- Station code: KJV
- Zone(s): Western Railway
- Division(s): Bhavnagar
Location
- Location within India Location within Gujarat

Khijadiya Junction Railway Station is a junction railway station in Khijadiya, Amreli district. Its station code is KJV. It is under Bhavnagar railway division of Western Railway Zone of Indian Railways.
