= Bhavnagar Terminus–Haridwar Weekly Express =

Train in India

Bhavnagar Terminus – Haridwar Bi-Weekly Express
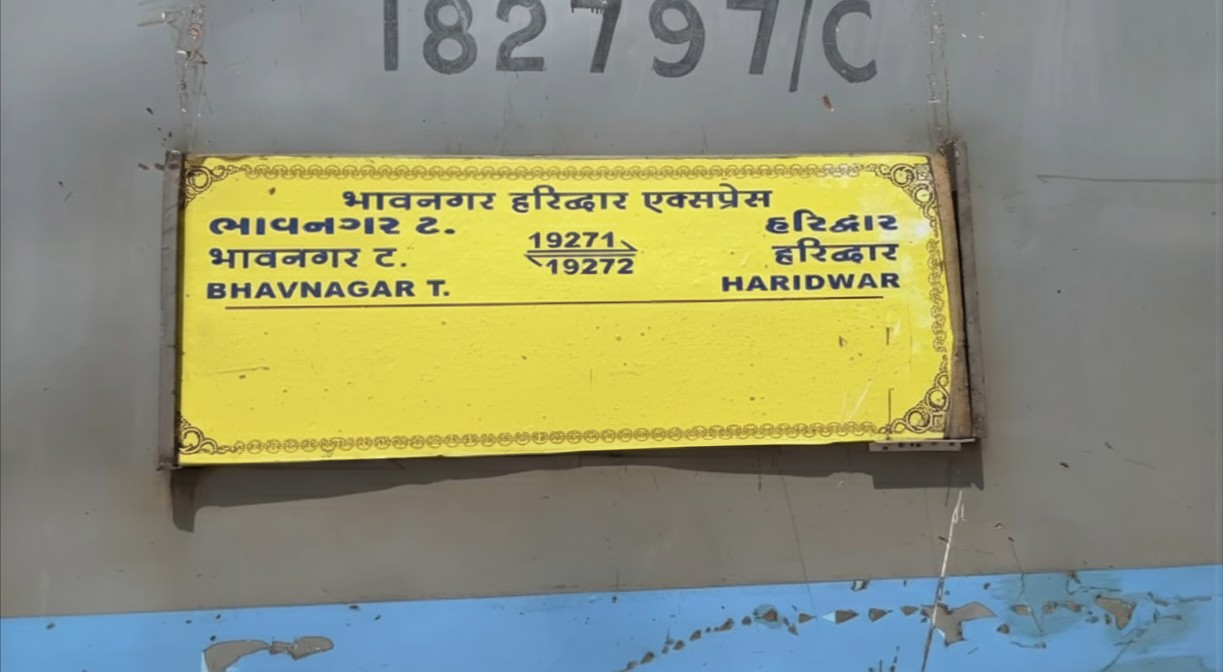

Overview
- Service type: Express
- Locale: Gujarat, Rajasthan, Haryana, Punjab, Uttar Pradesh, Uttarakhand
- First service: September 2023; 2 years ago
- Current operator: Western Railway

Route
- Termini: Bhavnagar Terminus (BVC); Haridwar Junction (HW)
- Stops: 35
- Distance travelled: 1,574 km (978 mi)
- Average journey time: 31hrs 20mnts
- Service frequency: Bi-weekly
- Train number: 19271 / 19272

On-board services
- Classes: General Unreserved, Sleeper, AC 3rd Tier, AC 2nd Tier
- Seating arrangements: Yes
- Sleeping arrangements: Yes
- Catering facilities: E-catering
- Observation facilities: Large windows

Technical
- Rolling stock: LHB coach
- Track gauge: 1,676 mm (5 ft 6 in)
- Operating speed: 110 km/h (68 mph) maximum, 50 km/h (31 mph) average including halts

The 19271 / 19272 Bhavnagar Terminus - Haridwar Express is an Express train belonging to Western Railway zone that runs between Bhavnagar Terminus of Gujarat and Haridwar of Uttarakhand in India. Since 1 April 2024, this train runs with LHB coach.

It operates as train number 19271 from Bhavnagar Terminus to Haridwar Junction and as train number 19272 in the reverse direction, serving the states of Uttarakhand, Uttar Pradesh, Haryana, Punjab, Rajasthan and Gujarat

== Service ==
- 19271/ Bhavnagar Terminus–Haridwar Express has an average speed of 50 km/h and covers 1574 km in 31h 20m.
- 19272/ Haridwar–Bhavnagar Terminus Express has an average speed of 50 km/h and covers 1574 km in 31h 00m.

== Routes and halts ==
The important halts of the train are:

- Bhavnagar Terminus
- Bhavnagar Para
- Sihor Junction
- Dhola Junction
- Botad Junction
- Limbdi
- Surendranagar Gate
- Viramgam Junction
- Mahesena Junction
- Patan
- Bhildi
- Dhanera
- Marwar Bhinmal
- Modran
- Jalor
- Samdari Junction
- Jodhpur Junction
- Degana Junction
- Choti Khatu
- Didwana
- Ladnun
- Sujangarh
- Ratangarh Junction
- Churu
- Sadulpur Junction
- Hisar Junction
- Jakhal Junction
- Dhuri Junction
- Patiala
- Rajpura Junction
- Ambala Cantt Junction
- Saharanpur
- Roorkee
- Haridwar Junction.

== Schedule ==
| Train number | Station code | Departure station | Departure time | Departure day | Arrival station | Arrival time | Arrival day |
|---|---|---|---|---|---|---|---|
| 19271 | BVC | Bhavnagar Terminus | 20:20 PM | Mon, Thu | Haridwar | 03:40 AM | Wed, Sat |
| 19272 | HW | Haridwar | 05:00 AM | Wed, Sat | Bhavnagar Terminus | 12:00 PM | Thu, Sun |

== Coach composition ==
The train has standard LHB coaches with max speed of 110 kmph. The train consists of 22 coaches:

- 2 AC-2 Tier
- 6 AC-3 Tier
- 8 Sleeper class coaches
- 4 Second class coaches
- 1 Seating Cum Luggage Coaches
- 1 EOG car

As with most train services in India, coach composition may be amended at the discretion of Indian Railways depending on demand.

== Traction ==
As the entire route is fully electrified it is hauled by a Vadodara Loco Shed-based WAP-5 or WAP-7 electric locomotive from Bhavnagar to Haridwar and vice versa.

== Rake reversal ==
The train reverses its direction twice.

1. Hisar Junction
2. Dhuri Junction

== See also ==
Trains from Bhavnagar Terminus :

1. Kochuveli–Bhavnagar Express
2. Bhavnagar Terminus–Kakinada Port Express
3. Bhavnagar Terminus–Udhampur Janmabhoomi Express
4. Parasnath Express
5. Bandra Terminus–Bhavnagar Terminus Superfast Express
6. Bandra Terminus–Bhavnagar Terminus Weekly Superfast Express

Trains from Haridwar Junction :

1. Haridwar–Amritsar Jan Shatabdi Express
2. Bandra Terminus–Haridwar Express
3. Haridwar–Shri Ganganagar Intercity Express
4. Haridwar–Una Link Janshatabdi Express
5. Haridwar–Ramnagar Intercity Express
6. Haridwar–Jammu Tawi Express

== Notes ==
a. Runs one day in a week for every direction
