= Gandhinagar Capital–Bhavnagar Terminus Intercity Express =

Train in India

Overview
- Service type: Intercity Express
- First service: 10 February 2019; 6 years ago
- Current operator(s): Western Railway

Route
- Termini: Gandhinagar Capital (GNC); Bhavnagar Terminus (BVC)
- Stops: 7
- Distance travelled: 310 km (193 mi)
- Average journey time: 6 hours 10 minutes
- Service frequency: Daily
- Train number(s): 19203 / 19204

On-board services
- Class(es): General Unreserved
- Seating arrangements: Yes
- Sleeping arrangements: No
- Catering facilities: No
- Observation facilities: Large windows
- Baggage facilities: No
- Other facilities: Below the seats

Technical
- Rolling stock: ICF coach
- Track gauge: 1,676 mm (5 ft 6 in)
- Operating speed: 50 km/h (31 mph) average including halts.

The 12203 / 12204 Gandhinagar Capital–Bhavnagar Terminus Intercity Express is an express train belonging to the Western Railway zone that runs between Gandhinagar Capital and Bhavnagar Terminus in India. It is currently being operated with 19203/19204 train numbers on a daily basis.

== Service ==
- 19203 Gandhinagar Capital–Bhavnagar Terminus Intercity Express has an average speed of 50 km/h and covers 310 km in 6 hours 10 minutes.
- 19204 Bhavnagar Terminus–Gandhinagar Capital Intercity Express has an average speed of 49 km/h and covers 310 km in 6 hours 10 minutes.

== Schedule ==
Train number	Departure station	Departure time	Departure day	Arrival station	Arrival time	Arrival day
14819	Gandhinagar Capital	17:45	Daily	Bhavnagar Terminus	23:55	Daily
14820	Bhavnagar Terminus	04:50	Daily	Gandhinagar Capital	11:10	Daily

== Route ==
- Gandhinagar Capital
- Viramgam Junction
- Botad Junction
- Sihor Junction
- Surendranagar Gate
- Bhavnagar Para
- Bhavnagar Terminus

== Coach composition ==
The train has dedicated ICF rakes and PM of rakes is done at Gandhinagar Capital. The train consists of 10 coaches:

- 8 General Unreserved
- 2 End-on Generator

== Traction ==
Both trains are hauled by a Vatva Loco Shed diesel WDM-3A locomotive from Gandhinagar to Bhavnagar and vice versa.

== See also ==
- Gandhinagar Capital railway station
- Bhavnagar Terminus
- Bhavnagar Terminus–Udhampur Janmabhoomi Express
