= Dhola =

Dhola may refer to the following places :

In South Asia

- Dhola, Gujarat, a town in Gujarat, India
  - Dhola State, a former princely state with capital in the above town
  - Dhola Junction railway station
- Dhola, Kulpi, a town in South 24 Parganas, West Bengal, India
- Dhola Post, border post in Arunachal Pradesh, India
- Dhola-Sadiya bridge, a bridge over Brahmaputra river in Assam, India
- Dhola, Nepal

Elsewhere

- Dhola, Iraq, a municipality in northern Iraq

== See also ==
- Dhol (disambiguation)
- Dhola Maru, a romantic tale from Rajasthan, India
- Dholna, a village in Uttar Pradesh, India
- Dholana Assembly constituency, electoral constituency in Uttar Pradesh, India
- Dholai, a village in Assam, India
- Dholai Port, a port in Gujarat, India
- Dholan Majra, a village in Punjab, India
- Dholanwal, a village in Punjab, India
- Dholakuva Circle metro station, of the Ahmedabad Metro in Gujarat, India
- Dholakhal railway station, in Tamenglong, Manipur, India
- Dholavira, Indus Valley Civilization site in Bhachau Taluka of Kutch District, Gujarat, India (World Heritage Site in the Kutch Desert Wildlife Sanctuary of the Great Rann of Kutch)
