= Wadhwan City railway station =

Railway station in Gujarat, India

General information
- Location: Wadhwan City, Gujarat; India
- Coordinates: 22°42′10″N 71°40′20″E
- Elevation: 70 m (229.7 ft)
- System: Indian Railways station
- Owner: Ministry of Railways, Indian Railways
- Operator: Western Railway
- Line: Surendranagar–Bhavnagar line
- Platforms: 1
- Tracks: 1

Construction
- Parking: No
- Cycle facilities: No

Other information
- Status: Functioning
- Station code: WC
- Zone(s): Western Railway
- Division(s): Bhavnagar
Location
- Location within India Location within Gujarat

Wadhwan City railway station is a railway station serving in Surendranagar district of Gujarat State of India. It is under Bhavnagar railway division of Western Railway Zone of Indian Railways. Its station code is 'WC'. Wadhwan City railway station is 8 km (5.0 mi) from Surendranagar Junction. Passenger, Express, and Superfast trains halt here.

Wadhwan City railway station serves Wadhwan City. Wadhwan City is well connected by rail to Surat, Bhavnagar Terminus, Delhi Sarai Rohilla, Surendranagar Junction, Botad Junction, Mahuva Junction, Okha and Dhrangadhra Junction. Wadhwan City was a princely state during the British Raj. The city of Wadhwan in the Saurashtra region of Gujarat was its capital.

== Trains ==
The following trains halt at Wadhwan City railway station in both directions:

- 12945/46 Surat–Mahuva Superfast Express
- 19579/80 Bhavnagar Terminus–Delhi Sarai Rohilla Link Express
