= Jorawarnagar railway station =

Railway station in Gujarat, India

General information
- Location: Surendranagar, Gujarat; India
- Coordinates: 22°42′45″N 71°38′31″E
- Elevation: 70 m (229.7 ft)
- System: Indian Railways station
- Owner: Ministry of Railways, Indian Railways
- Operator: Western Railway
- Line: Surendranagar–Bhavnagar line
- Platforms: 1
- Tracks: 1

Construction
- Parking: No
- Cycle facilities: No

Other information
- Status: Functioning
- Station code: JVN
- Zone(s): Western Railway
- Division(s): Bhavnagar
Location
- Location within India Location within Gujarat

Jorawarnagar railway station is a railway station serving in Surendranagar district of Gujarat State of India. It is under Bhavnagar railway division of Western Railway Zone of Indian Railways. Jorawarnagar railway station is 5 km from Surendranagar Junction. Passenger, Express and Superfast trains halt here.

== Trains ==
The following major trains halt at Jorawarnagar railway station in both directions:

- 12945/46 Surat–Mahuva Superfast Express
- 12941/42 Parasnath Express
- 19259/60 Kochuveli–Bhavnagar Express
- 12971/72 Bandra Terminus–Bhavnagar Terminus Express
- 19579/80 Bhavnagar Terminus–Delhi Sarai Rohilla Link Express

== See also ==
- Bhavnagar State Railway
