= Bandra Terminus–Veraval Weekly Superfast Express =

Train in India

Overview
- Service type: Superfast
- First service: 28 October 2023; 2 years ago
- Current operator: Western Railway

Route
- Termini: Bandra Terminus (BDTS); Veraval Junction (VRL)
- Stops: 22
- Distance travelled: 937 km (582 mi)
- Average journey time: 17 hours 45 minutes
- Service frequency: Weekly (Note: Runs one day in a week for every direction.)
- Train number: 19203 / 19204

On-board services
- Classes: AC First Class, AC 2 Tier, AC 3 Tier, Sleeper Class, General Unreserved
- Seating arrangements: Yes
- Sleeping arrangements: Yes
- Catering facilities: Available
- Observation facilities: Large windows
- Baggage facilities: Available
- Other facilities: Below the seats

Technical
- Rolling stock: LHB coach
- Track gauge: 1,676 mm (5 ft 6 in)
- Operating speed: 53 km/h (33 mph) average including halts.

The 19203 / 19204 Bandra Terminus–Veraval Weekly Superfast Express is a Superfast Express train belonging to Western Railway zone that runs between Bandra Terminus and Veraval Junction in India. It is currently being operated with 19203/19204 train numbers on a weekly basis.

== Route and halts ==
The important stops of the train are:

- Veraval Junction
- Junagadh Junction
- Jetalsar Junction
- Dhasa Junction
- Dhola Junction
- Botad Junction
- Ahmedabad Junction
- Nadiad Junction
- Anand Junction
- Vadodara
- Ankleshwar
- Surat
- Vapi
- Borivali
- Bandra Terminus

== Schedule ==
Train number	Station code	Departure station	Departure time	Departure day	Arrival station	Arrival time	Arrival day
19204	VRL	Veraval Junction	05:15 PM	Friday	Bandra Terminus	03:50 PM	Saturday
19203	BDTS	Bandra Terminus	07:25 PM	Saturday	Veraval Junction	01:10 PM	Sunday

== Rake sharing ==
The train shares its rake with 12945/12946 Veraval–Banaras Weekly Superfast Express.
