= Sihor Junction railway station =

Railway station in Gujarat, India

General information
- Location: Sihor, Gujarat; India
- Coordinates: 21°43′29″N 71°57′26″E
- Elevation: 43 m (141.1 ft)
- System: Indian Railways station
- Owner: Ministry of Railways, Indian Railways
- Operator: Western Railway
- Lines: Palitana–Sihor section Surendranagar–Bhavnagar line
- Platforms: 2
- Tracks: 3

Construction
- Structure type: Standard (on ground)
- Parking: Yes

Other information
- Status: Functioning
- Station code: SOJN
- Zone(s): Western Railway
- Division(s): Bhavnagar
Location
- Location within India Location within Gujarat

Sihor Junction railway station is a railway station serving in Bhavnagar district of Gujarat State of India. It is under Bhavnagar railway division of Western Railway zone of Indian Railways. Sihor Junction railway station is 20 km away from Bhavnagar Terminus. Passenger, Express, and Superfast trains halt here.

== Trains ==
The following trains halt at Sihor Junction railway station in both directions:

- 12941/42 Parasnath Express
- 19259/60 Kochuveli–Bhavnagar Express
- 12971/72 Bandra Terminus–Bhavnagar Terminus Express
- 19107/08 Bhavnagar Terminus–Udhampur Janmabhoomi Express
- 19579/80 Bhavnagar Terminus–Delhi Sarai Rohilla Link Express

== See also ==
- Bhavnagar State Railway
