= Surat–Mahuva Superfast Express =

Train in India

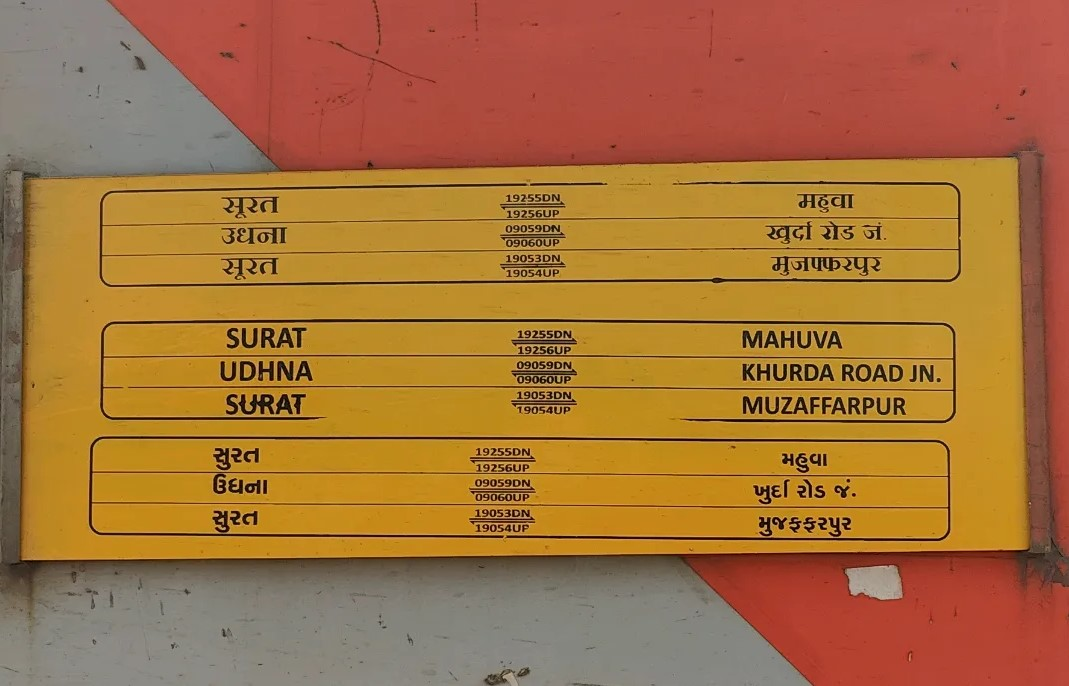

Overview
- Service type: Superfast Express
- Locale: Gujarat
- First service: 19 August 2021; 5 years ago
- Current operator: Western Railway

Route
- Termini: Surat (ST); Mahuva Junction (MHV)
- Stops: 14
- Distance travelled: 631 km (392 mi)
- Average journey time: 11 hours 10 minutes
- Service frequency: Five days a week (Note: Runs five days in a week for every direction.)
- Train number: 20955 / 20956

On-board services
- Classes: AC 2 Tier, AC 3 Tier, Sleeper Class, General Unreserved
- Seating arrangements: Yes
- Sleeping arrangements: Yes
- Catering facilities: E-catering only
- Observation facilities: Large windows
- Baggage facilities: Available

Technical
- Rolling stock: LHB coach
- Track gauge: 1,676 mm (5 ft 6 in)
- Operating speed: 58 km/h (36 mph) average including halts.

The 20955 / 20956 Surat–Mahuva Superfast Express is a Superfast train of the Indian Railways connecting Surat in South Gujarat and Mahuva Junction of Saurashtra. It is currently being operated with 20955/20956 train numbers on five days a week basis.

== Service ==
The 20955/Surat–Mahuva Superfast Express has an average speed of 56 km/h and covers 631 km in 11 hrs 10 mins.

The 20956/Mahuva–Surat Superfast Express has an average speed of 57 km/h and covers 631 km in 11 hrs 05 mins.

== Route and halts ==
- Surat
- Ankleshwar Junction
- Vadodara Junction
- Ahmedabad Junction
- Viramgam Junction
- Surendranagar Gate
- Botad Junction
- Dhola Junction
- Dhasa Junction
- Liliya Mota
- Savarkundla
- Rajula Junction
- Mahuva Junction.

== Coach composition ==
The train consists of 17 coaches :

- 1 AC III Tier
- 8 Sleeper coaches
- 6 General
- 2 Seating cum Luggage Rake

== Schedule ==
Train number	Station code	Departure station	Departure time	Departure day	Arrival station	Arrival time	Arrival day
20955	ST	Surat	22:00 PM	Sun, Mon, Tue, Thu, Sat	Mahuva	09:10 AM	Sun, Mon, Tue, Wed, Fri
20956	MHV	Mahuva	19:30 PM	Sun, Mon, Tue, Wed, Fri	Surat	06:35 AM	Mon, Tue, Wed, Thu, Sat

== Traction ==
Both trains are hauled by a Vatva Loco Shed-based WAP-4E or Valsad Loco Shed-based WAP-7 electric locomotive from Surat to Ahmedabad Junction and from Ahmedabad Junction, it is hauled by a Sabarmati Loco Shed-based WDP-4D diesel locomotive uptil Mahuva Junction, and vice versa.

== Rake sharing ==
The train shares its rake with 19053/19054 Surat-Muzaffarpur Express.

== See also ==
- Surat railway station
- Mahuva Junction railway station
