= Jwalamukhi Rural Municipality =

Rural Municipality in Central Nepal

Jwalamukhi ज्वालामुखी
- Rural Municipality in Nepal
- Location in Nepal
- Coordinates: 27°38′43.3″N 84°34′3.68″E
- Country: Nepal
- Development Region: Central
- District: Dhading
- Province: Bagmati Province
- Rural Municipality: Jwalamukhi

Government
  - Chairperson: Yam Nath Danai (NC)
  - Vice Chairperson: Dharma Bahadur Aryal CPN (Unified Socialist)

Area
  - Total: 114.04 km^{2} (44.03 sq mi)

Population (2017)
  - Total: 23,966
  - Density: 210.15/km^{2} (544.30/sq mi)
- Time zone: UTC+5:45 (NST)
- Area code: 010
- Website: jwalamukhimun.gov.np

Jwalamukhi (Nepali: ज्वालामुखी, romanized: jwalamukhi) is a Gaupalika (Nepali: गाउपालिका, romanized: gaupalika) (formerly: village development committee) in Dhading District in the Bagmati Zone of central Nepal. The local body was formed by merging four VDCs namely Khari, Dhola, Nepal, Maidi and Chainpur, Bagmati. Currently, it has a total of 7 wards. The population of the rural municipality is 23,966 according to the data collected on 2017 Nepalese local elections.Chairman of this rural municipality is Binod Timalsina and he belongs to Nepali Congress Party.

== Demographics ==
At the time of the 2011 Nepal census, Jwalamukhi Rural Municipality had a population of 23,966. Of these, 83.6% spoke Nepali, 6.1% Magar, 5.5% Tamang, 2.2% Newar, 2.1% Kumhali, 0.2% Gurung, 0.1% Maithili and 0.1% other languages as their first language.

In terms of ethnicity/caste, 19.6% were Hill Brahmin, 17.3% Newar, 14.8% Magar, 13.9% Chhetri, 8.8% Sarki, 5.7% Tamang, 4.7% Gurung, 4.4% Kumal, 3.9% Kami, 2.7% Damai/Dholi, 1.1% Sanyasi/Dasnami, 1.0% Gharti/Bhujel, 0.8% Thakuri, 0.3% Majhi, 0.3% Thakali, 0.2% Hajam/Thakur, 0.1% Musalman, 0.1% Teli and 0.2% others.

In terms of religion, 89.6% were Hindu, 6.2% Christian, 4.0% Buddhist, 0.1% Muslim and 0.1% others.

In terms of literacy, 60.5% could both read and write, 2.2% could read but not write and 37.2% could neither read nor write.

== Geography ==
East: Niklantha Municipality

West: Gorkha District

North: Triuprasundari Gaupalika and Gorkha District

South: Siddhalek Gaupalika and Gorkha District

== Population ==
As per 2017, Jwalamukhi hosts a population of 23,966 across a total area of 114.04 km^{2}.

== See also ==
- Dhading District
