= Dhol (disambiguation) =

A dhol is a type of drum used in South Asia.

Dhol may also refer to:

- Caucasian dhol, a drum of the Caucasus
- Dhol (film), a 2007 Indian Hindi-language film
- Dhol Faqeer (1921–1992), famous mystic and folk singer of Sindh, Pakistan

== See also ==
- Dhola (disambiguation)
- Dohol, a drum used in Greater Iran
- The Dhol Foundation, a dhol drum institute in London and a musical group playing bhangra music
- Dohl, a German surname
- Dhool, a 2003 Indian film
- Dhool (2011 film), an Indian film
- Gujarati cinema or Dhollywood (dhol (the drum) + Hollywood), Gujarati-language film industry in India
- Dholak, another type of Indian drum
  - Dholak ke Geet, Indian folk songs surng with the dholak
- Navnit Dholakia, Baron Dholakia (born 1937), British Liberal Democrat politician
- Dholakpur, fictional city in the Indian animated series Chhota Bheem
