= DGJ =

DGJ may refer to:

- Directors Guild of Japan, a trade union created to represent the interests of film directors in the film industry in Japan
- DGJ, the station code for Dungar Junction railway station, Gujarat, India
