= Savarkundla railway station =

Railway station in Gujarat, India

General information
- Location: Savarkundla, Gujarat; India
- Coordinates: 21°20′07″N 71°18′48″E
- Elevation: 140 m (459.3 ft)
- System: Indian Railways station
- Owner: Ministry of Railways, Indian Railways
- Operator: Western Railway
- Line: Dhola–Mahuva
- Platforms: 1
- Tracks: 1

Construction
- Parking: No
- Cycle facilities: No

Other information
- Status: Functioning
- Station code: SVKD
- Zone(s): Western Railway
- Division(s): Bhavnagar
Location
- Location within Gujarat

Savarkundla railway station is a major railway station serving in Amreli district of Gujarat State of India. It is under Bhavnagar railway division of Western Railway zone of Indian Railways. Savarkundla railway station is 70 km away from Mahuva Junction. Passenger and Superfast trains halt here.

== Major trains ==
Following major trains halt at Savarkundla railway station in both direction:

- 12945/46 Surat–Mahuva Superfast Express
