= Rajula Junction railway station =

Railway station in Gujarat, India

General information
- Location: Rajula, Gujarat; India
- Coordinates: 21°06′08″N 71°28′53″E
- Elevation: 66 m (216.5 ft)
- System: Indian Railways station
- Owner: Ministry of Railways, Indian Railways
- Operator: Western Railway
- Lines: Dhola–Mahuva; Rajula–Pipavav Port
- Platforms: 1
- Tracks: 1

Construction
- Parking: No
- Cycle facilities: No

Other information
- Status: Functioning
- Station code: RLA
- Zone(s): Western Railway
- Division(s): Bhavnagar
Location
- Location within India Location within Gujarat

Rajula Junction railway station is a railway station serving in Amreli district of Gujarat State of India. It is under Bhavnagar railway division of Western Railway Zone of Indian Railways. Rajula Junction railway station is 31 km from Mahuva Junction. Passenger and Superfast trains halt here.

== Trains ==
The following trains halt at Rajula Junction railway station in both directions:

- 12945/46 Surat–Mahuva Superfast Express
