= Dhola Junction railway station =

Railway station in Gujarat, India

Dhola junction railway station

General information
- Location: Dhola, Gujarat; India
- Coordinates: 21°49′20″N 71°44′22″E
- Elevation: 37 m (121.4 ft)
- System: Indian Railways station
- Owner: Ministry of Railways, Indian Railways
- Operator: Western Railway
- Lines: Bhavnagar–Surendranagar–Ahmedabad; Bhavnagar–Sihor–Palitana; Bhavnagar–Botad–Dhola–Ahmedabad; Dhola–Mahuva
- Platforms: 3
- Tracks: 3

Construction
- Parking: No
- Cycle facilities: No

Other information
- Status: Functioning
- Station code: DLJ
- Zone(s): Western Railway
- Division(s): Bhavnagar
Location
- Location within India Location within Gujarat

Dhola Junction railway station is a major railway station serving in Bhavnagar district of Gujarat State of India. It serves Dhola town. It is under Bhavnagar railway division of Western Railway zone of Indian Railways. Dhola Junction railway station is 49 km away from Bhavnagar Terminus. Passenger, Express and Superfast trains halt here.

== Trains ==
The following trains halt at Dhola Junction railway station in both directions:

- 12945/46 Surat–Mahuva Superfast Express
- 12941/42 Parasnath Express
- 19259/60 Kochuveli–Bhavnagar Express
- 12971/72 Bandra Terminus–Bhavnagar Terminus Express
- 19107/08 Bhavnagar Terminus–Udhampur Janmabhoomi Express
- 19272/71 Bhavnagar Terminus–Haridwar Weekly Express
- 12945/46 Veraval-Banaras Superfast Express
- 19203/04 Veraval-Bandra Terminus Weekly Express

== See also ==
- Bhavnagar State Railway
