= Hadala Bhal railway station =

Railway station in Gujarat, India

General information
- Location: Limbadi to Fedara Rd, Hadala, Surendranagar district, Gujarat; India
- Coordinates: 22.4864°N 72.1311°E
- Elevation: 11 metres (36 ft)
- System: Indian Railways station
- Owner: Indian Railways
- Operator: Western Railway
- Line: Ahmedabad–Botad line

Construction
- Structure type: Standard (on ground station)

Other information
- Status: Single diesel line
- Station code: HLB
- Zone(s): Western Railway
- Division(s): Bhavnagar
Location
- Location within India Location within Gujarat

Hadala Bhal railway station is a small railway station in Surendranagar district, Gujarat. Its code is HLB. It serves Hadala village.

Hadala Bhal railway station is part of Ahmedabad–Botad line. Currently this line is undergoing gauge conversion, from metre to broad gauge. In March 2019 the section between Botad Junction and Hadala Bhal stations was commissioned (67 km), remaining under gauge conversion Hadala Bhal – Ahmedabad Junction (98 km).
