= Palitana railway station =

Railway station in Gujarat, India

General information
- Location: Palitana, Gujarat; India
- Coordinates: 21°32′16″N 71°49′22″E
- Elevation: 63 m (206.7 ft)
- System: Indian Railways station
- Owner: Ministry of Railways, Indian Railways
- Operator: Western Railway
- Line: Palitana–Sihor section
- Platforms: 2
- Tracks: 3

Construction
- Structure type: Standard (on ground)
- Parking: No
- Cycle facilities: No

Other information
- Status: Functioning
- Station code: PIT
- Zone(s): Western Railway
- Division(s): Bhavnagar
Location
- Location within India Location within Gujarat

Palitana railway station is a railway station serving in Bhavnagar district of Gujarat State of India. It is under Bhavnagar railway division of Western Railway Zone of Indian Railways. Palitana railway station is 48 km away from Bhavnagar Terminus. Four passenger and one Superfast trains start from here.

== Trains ==
The following train terminates at Palitana railway station:

Another 04 Passenger train running between Palitana - Bhavnagar Terminus Route Before the Covid-19 Pandemic.

Currently Running 1 Covid 19 Special train between Palitana and Bhavnagar terminus. And Palitana = Bandra Terminus SF Express.

== See also ==
- Bhavnagar State Railway
