= Dungar Junction railway station =

Railway station in Gujarat, India

Dungar junction railway station

General information
- Location: Dungar, Bhavnagar district India
- Coordinates: 21°04′44″N 71°33′12″E
- Elevation: 40 m (131 ft)
- System: Indian Railway Station
- Owner: Ministry of Railways, Indian Railways
- Operator: Western Railway
- Lines: Dhola - Mahuva line Dungar - Victor line
- Platforms: 1
- Tracks: 1

Construction
- Structure type: Standard (On Ground)
- Parking: No

Other information
- Status: Functioning
- Station code: DGJ
- Zone(s): Western Railway
- Division(s): Bhavnagar
Location
- Location within Gujarat

Dungar Junction railway station is a railway station on the Western Railway network in the state of Gujarat, India. Dungar Junction railway station is 22 km away from Mahuva Junction railway station. Passenger trains halt here.

== See also ==
- Bhavnagar district
