= Palitana–Sihor section =

Railway division in Gujarat, India

Overview
- Status: Operational
- Owner: Indian Railways
- Locale: Gujarat
- Termini: Palitana; Sihor
- Stations: 2

Service
- Operator(s): Western Railway

Technical
- Track length: 27.62 km (17 mi)
- Number of tracks: 1
- Track gauge: 5 ft 6 in (1,676 mm) broad gauge
- Electrification: Yes (CSR completed on 31st March 2022)

The Palitana–Sihor section belongs to Bhavnagar division of Western Railway zone in Gujarat State.

== History ==
Palitana–Sihor section was opened in 1910. The length of Palitana–Sihor section was 27.62 km. Palitana–Sihor section was opened again after Meter gauge to Broad gauge conversion in 2005.
