= Dhasa Junction railway station =

Railway station in Gujarat, India

General information
- Location: Dhasa, Gujarat; India
- Coordinates: 21°46′55″N 71°31′03″E
- Elevation: 102 m (334.6 ft)
- System: Indian Railways station
- Owner: Ministry of Railways, Indian Railways
- Operator: Western Railway
- Line: Dhola–Mahuva
- Platforms: 2
- Tracks: 2

Construction
- Parking: No
- Cycle facilities: No

Other information
- Status: Functioning
- Station code: DAS
- Zone(s): Western Railway
- Division(s): Bhavnagar
Location
- Location within India Location within Gujarat

Dhasa Junction railway station is a major railway station serving in Botad district of Gujarat State of India. It is under Bhavnagar railway division of Western Railway Zone of Indian Railways. Dhasa Junction railway station is 69 km far away from Botad Junction. Passenger and Superfast trains halt here.

== Major trains ==
Following major trains halt at Dhasa Junction railway station in both direction:

- 12945/46 Surat–Mahuva Superfast Express

== See also ==
- Bhavnagar State Railway
