= Diesel Loco Shed, Ratlam =

Loco shed in Madhya Pradesh, India

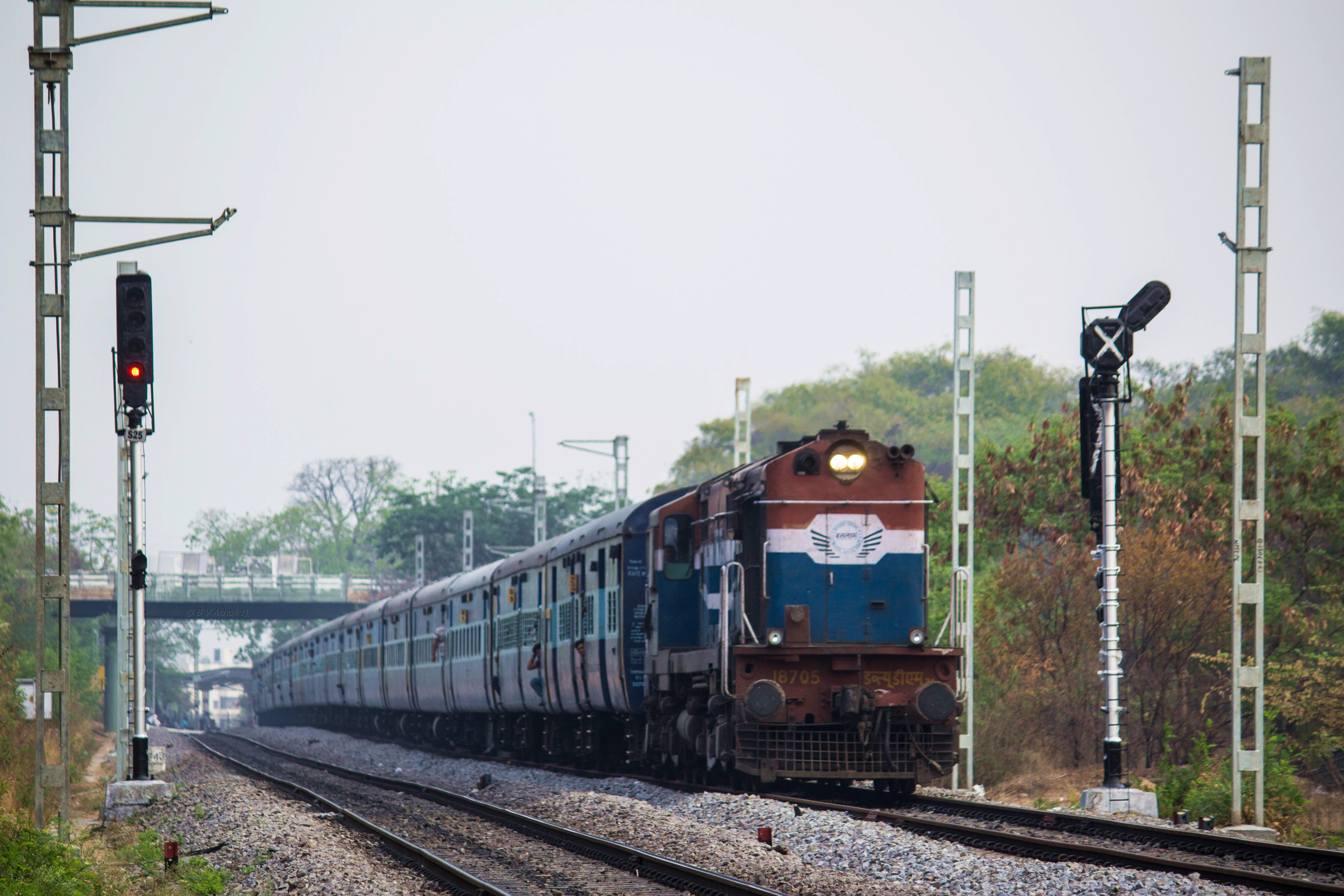
- Ratlam-based WDM-3A hauling the Ajmer-Hyderabad Urs special train

- Location within Madhya Pradesh

Location
- Location: Ratlam, Madhya Pradesh
- Coordinates: 23°20′27″N 75°03′04″E

Characteristics
- Owner: Indian Railways
- Operator: Western Railway
- Depot code: RTM
- Type: Engine shed
- Rolling stock: WDG-3A, WDM-3D, WDS-6, WAP-4, WAG-5, WAG-7

History
- Opened: 1 May 1967; 59 years ago

Diesel Loco Shed, Ratlam is an engine shed located in Ratlam, Madhya Pradesh in India. It is located north-east of Ratlam Junction falling under Ratlam railway division. The shed caters to the needs of freight as well as passenger trains. One of the three loco sheds in the Western Railway zone, this is the largest among them followed by Vatva, and Sabarmati.

== History ==
It was established on 1 May 1967 with capacity holding of 15 locomotives, but currently, it holds around 177 locomotives, WDM-2A, WDM-3A, Inferior Service WDM-2A and WDS-6 class. It received its first locomotive, a WDM-2, from New Katni Junction.

== Livery and markings ==
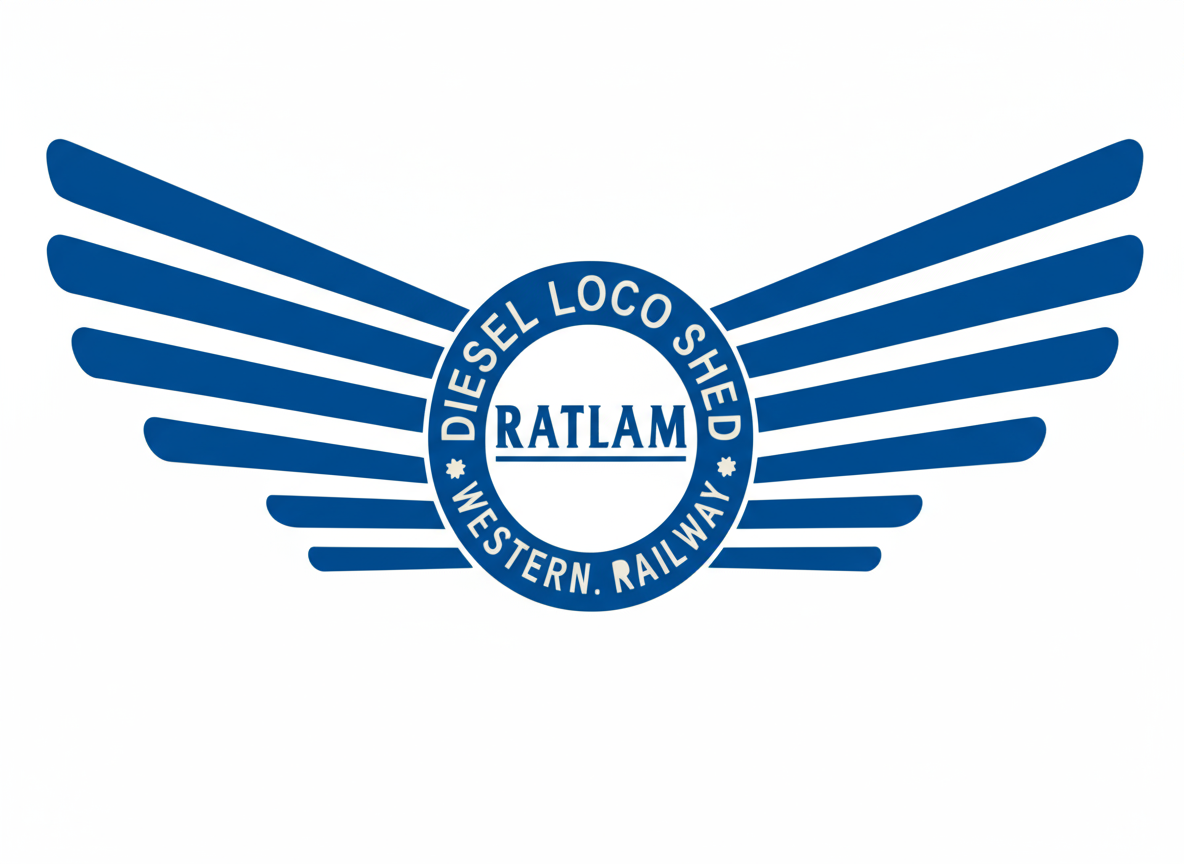
Logo Mark (English) of Diesel Loco Shed, Ratlam

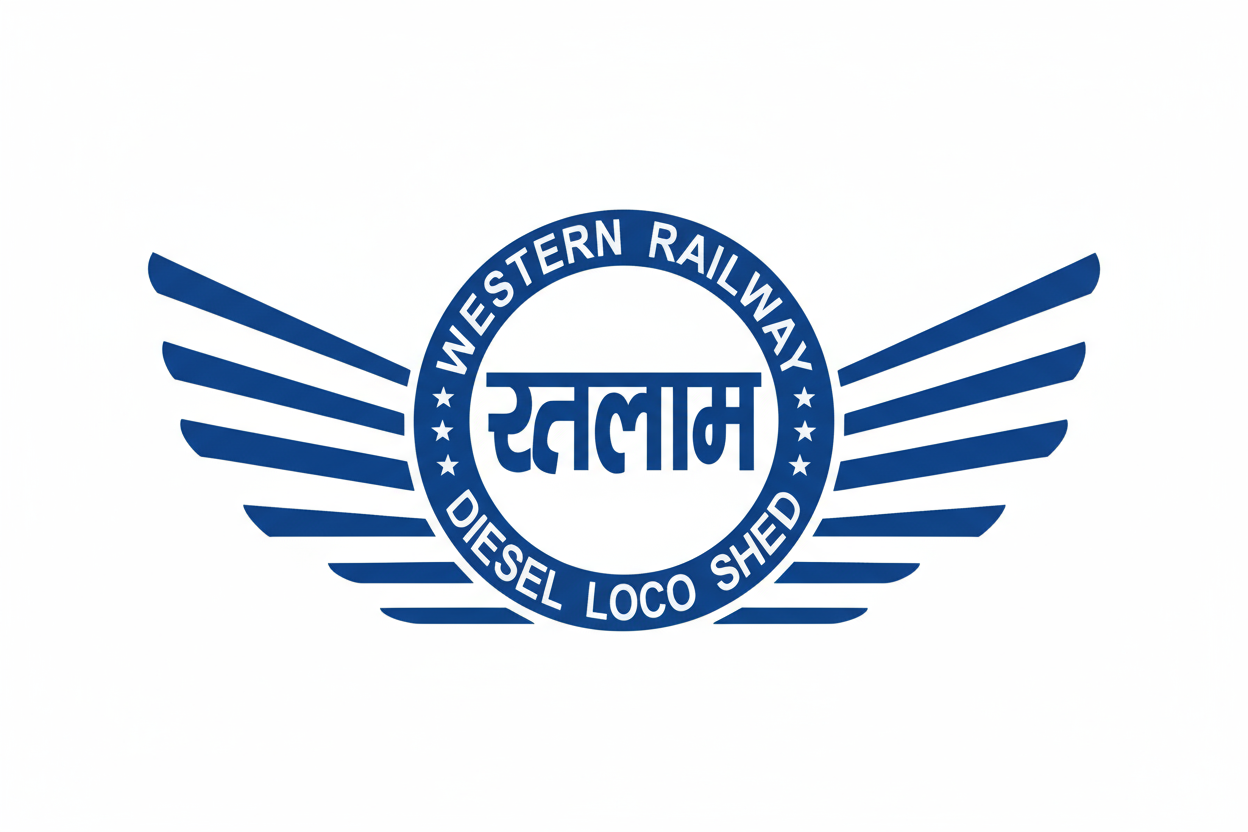
Logo Mark (Hindi) of Diesel Loco Shed, Ratlam

Ratlam DLS has its own logo and stencils. It is written on loco's body side as well as front & back side.

== Locomotives ==
Serial No.	Locomotive Class	Horsepower	Quantity
1.	WDM-3D	3300	11
2.	WDG-3A	3100	31
3.	WDS-6	1400	3
4.	WAP-4	5350	10
5.	WAG-5	3850	75
6.	WAG-7	5350	68
Total Locomotives active as of November 2026			198

== See also ==
- Diesel Loco Shed, Mhow
- Diesel Loco Shed, Vatva
- Diesel Loco Shed, Sabarmati
- Electric Loco Shed, Valsad
- Electric Loco Shed, Vadodara
