= Liliya Mota railway station =

Railway station in Gujarat, India

General information
- Location: Liliya Mota, Amreli district India
- Coordinates: 21°32′18″N 71°22′15″E
- Elevation: 93 m (305.1 ft)
- System: Indian Railway Station
- Owner: Ministry of Railways, Indian Railways
- Operator: Western Railway
- Line: Dhola - Mahuva line
- Platforms: 1
- Tracks: 1

Construction
- Parking: No
- Cycle facilities: No

Other information
- Status: Functioning
- Station code: LMO
- Zone(s): Western Railway
- Division(s): Bhavnagar
Location
- Location within India Location within Gujarat

Liliya Mota railway station is a railway station serving in Amreli district of Gujarat State of India. It is under Bhavnagar railway division of Western Railway Zone of Indian Railways. Passenger and Superfast trains halt here.

== Trains ==
The following Superfast trains halt at Liliya Mota railway station in both directions:

- 12945/46 Surat - Mahuva Superfast Express
