= Indian locomotive class WAP-4 =

Indian Railway passenger class electric locomotive

WAP-4
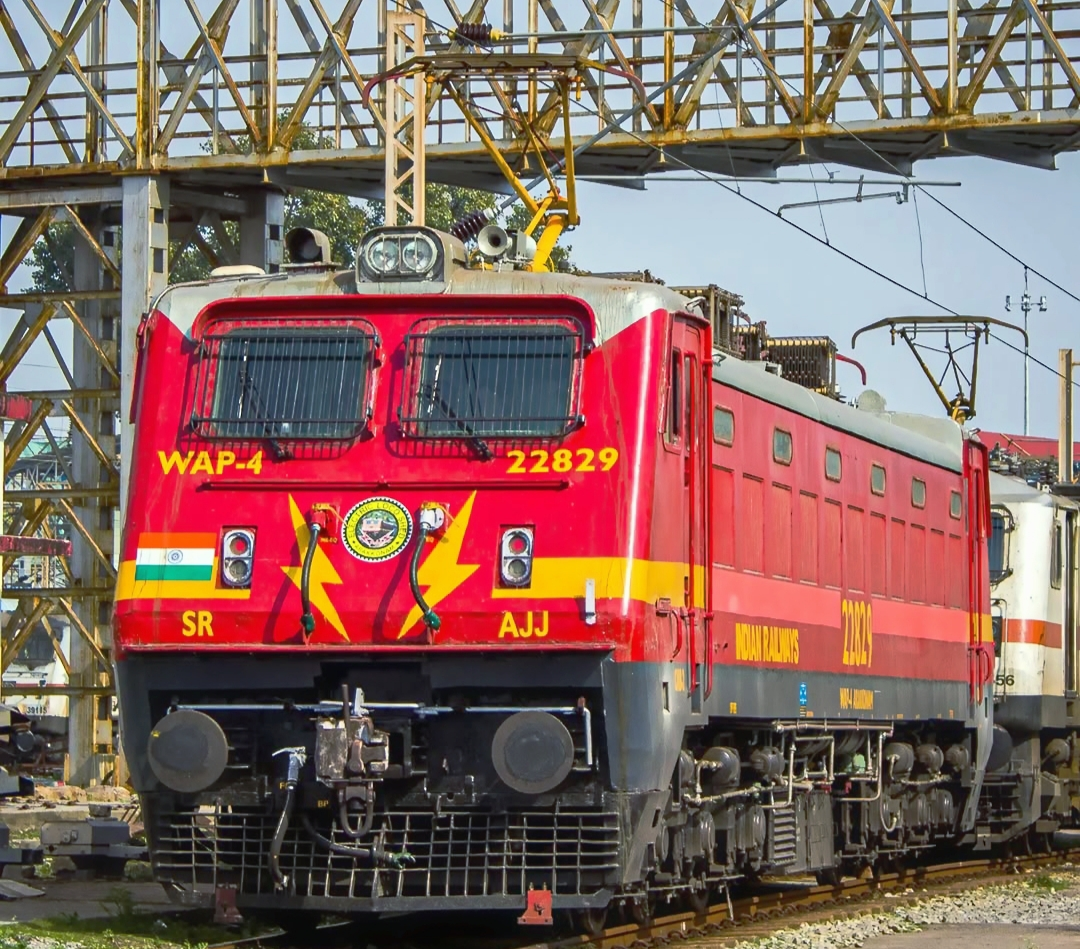
- Arakkonam based WAP-4 at Bilaspur Jn.
Type and origin
- Power type: Electric
- Builder: Chittaranjan Locomotive Works
- Build date: 1993-2015
- Total produced: 778
Specifications
- Configuration
  - AAR: C-C
  - UIC: Co'-Co'
- Gauge: 5 ft 6 in (1,676 mm)
- Bogies: Co-Co Flexicoil Mark 90 cast bogies; primary and secondary wheel springs with bolsters
- Wheel diameter: New: 1,092 mm (3 ft 7 in); Half worn: 1,055 mm (3 ft 5 1/2 in); Full worn: 1,016 mm (3 ft 4 in)
- Length: 18.794 m (61 ft 7 29/32 in)
- Width: 3.179 m (10 ft 5 5/32 in)
- Height: 4.272 m (14 ft 3/16 in)
- Axle load: 18,800 kg (41,400 lb)
- Loco weight: 116,000 kg (256,000 lb)
- Electric system/s: 25 kV 50 Hz AC Overhead
- Current pickup: Pantograph
- Traction motors: Hitachi HS15250
- Loco brake: Air
- Train brakes: Air
- Safety systems: Slip control, Over voltage relay, Main overload relay, Earth Fault Relay, Low Pressure Governor, Brake Cylinder Cutoff Valve, Train parting alarms and No OHE volt relay
Performance figures
- Maximum speed: 140 km/h (87 mph)
- Power output
  - Continuous: 5,050 hp (3,766 kW)
- Tractive effort
  - Starting: 30,800 kgf (302 kN; 68,000 lbf)
Career
- Operators: Indian Railways
- Numbers: 22061 and from 22201-22399, 22500-22999 & 25000-25051
- Locale: All over India
- Disposition: Active

The Indian locomotive class WAP-4 is a class of 25 kV AC electric locomotives that was developed in 1993 by Chittaranjan Locomotive Works for Indian Railways. The model name stands for broad gauge (W), AC Current (A), Passenger traffic (P) locomotive, 4th generation (4). They entered service in late 1994. A total of 778 WAP-4 were built at CLW between 1993 and 2015, which made them the most numerous class of mainline electric passenger locomotive until the introduction of WAP-7 in 2000.

The WAP-4 is one of the most successful locomotives of Indian Railways serving passenger trains for over 29 years. This class provided the basic design for other locomotives like the WAP-6. Despite the introduction of more modern types of locomotives like WAP-7, a significant number are still in use, both in mainline duties. Production of this class was halted in December 2015 with locomotive number 25051 being the last unit to be rolled out.

As of November 2025, all locomotives except those lost in accidents still retain "operational status" on the mainline as WAP-4, with further examples having been converted from WAP-6.

== History ==
=== Development ===
The WAP-4 class was developed after its predecessor, the WAP-1, was found inadequate to haul the longer, heavier express trains (24-26 coaches) that were becoming the mainstay of the Indian Railways network. IR/RDSO had realized that the reason for the WAP-1’s performance problems were the low-powered 770 hp Alstom TAO 659 traction motors. These were previously used with for the WAM-4 and WAG-5 classes but were too underpowered for modern requirements. At that time, new 840 hp Hitachi 15250 traction motors which had been adopted for use on newer WAG-5s was showing promise. So, these traction motors were adopted on to WAP-1s Flex-icoil Mark I fabricated bogies, and with a new indigenously designed 5400 kVA transformer and silicon rectifiers.

It also was among the first locomotives to get a microprocessor-based control and fault diagnostics system. To accommodate the heavier Hitachi motors without increasing its 112t overall weight, the WAP-4 was made substantially lighter by the widespread use of aluminum materials in construction. The underframe of WAP-4 is narrower and lighter and also completely different from that of the WAP-1 to enable it to handle higher loads.

=== Design ===
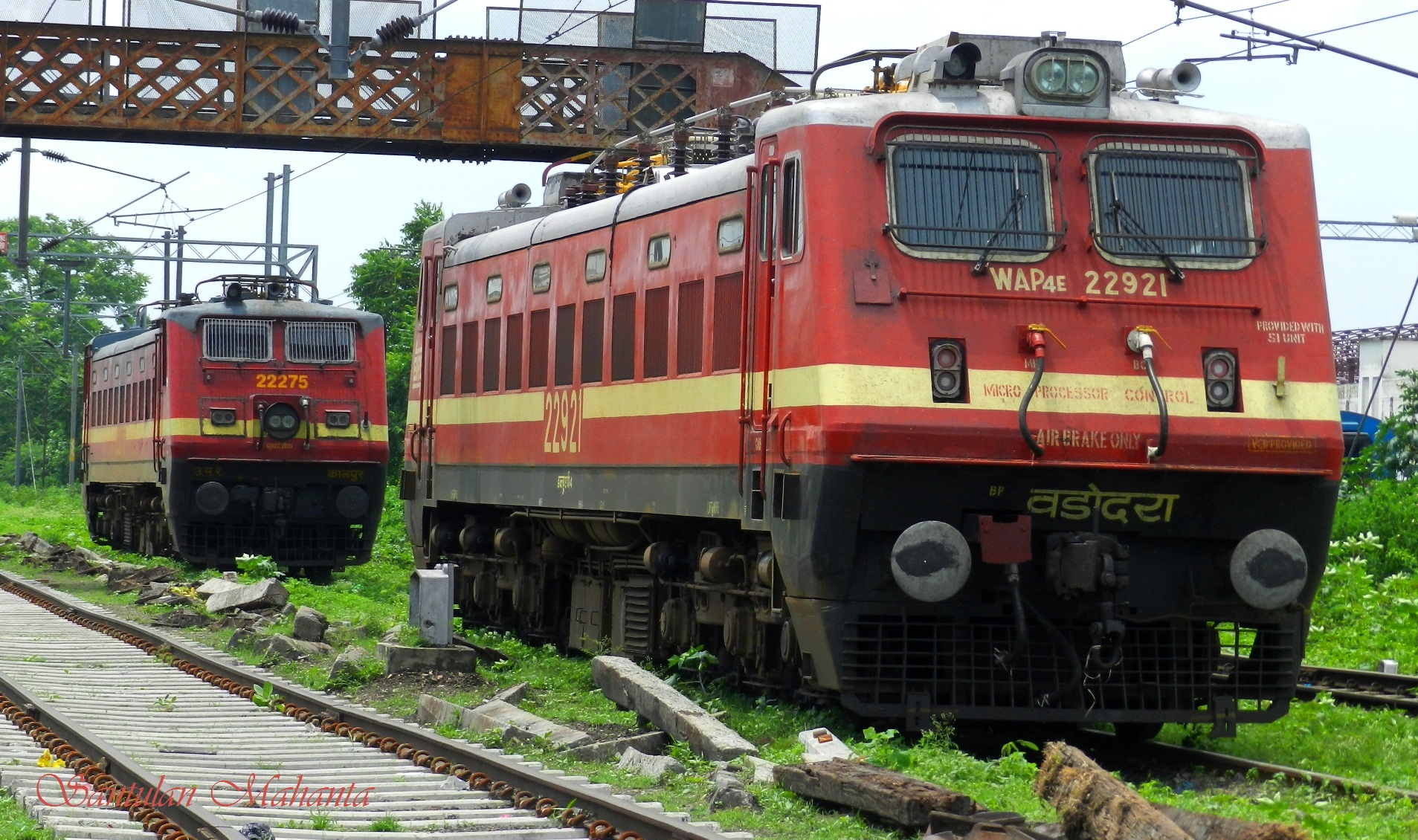
(front) newer loco with (back) older series unit

The loco has a streamlined twin cab carbody design, with top-mounted headlamps. The first 150 or so units had the headlamp mounted at waist level, with the lights being mounted in a protruding nacelle. Later on the headlamps were placed in a recessed nacelle, and from road # 22573 onward, the headlamps were moved to the top. Newer locos also feature larger windshields, more spacious driver cabin with bucket type seats and ergonomic controls. The control panel also features a mix of digital and analog displays in newer units (all analog display in older versions).

=== Production ===
The first WAP-4 unit, #22201 rolled out from CLW on April 25, 1994. They looked exactly like the WAP-1, even sporting the same livery. From 2000, newer versions with many WAP-5 design cues like square type windscreens, twin-beam headlights, speed recorders and some changes to the control electronics had been rolled out recently.

However, in the face of the advent of three-phase AC traction motors, IGBT-controlled AC drives, and full computer controls, the DC traction motors were getting increasingly outdated. As a result, after over 20 years, production of the WAP-4 locomotives ceased on November 1, 2015, with the 776th unit, #25051, being rolled out.

== Service ==
The WAP-4s were developed at the same time IR gave procurement orders for WAP-5 locomotives, as they were meant for more general duties of hauling 24-coach expresses while WAP-5 were specially meant for high-speed operations.

Recently as per directive received from Railway Board, all the loco sheds holding WAP-4 type locomotives have started multiple unit (MU) operations. This configuration of MU-fitted WAP-4 locos are being used to haul medium tonnage faster freight trains across IR. The different locomotive sheds of WAP-4 are Arakkonam, Santragachi, Erode, Mughalsarai, Howrah and Bhusaval.

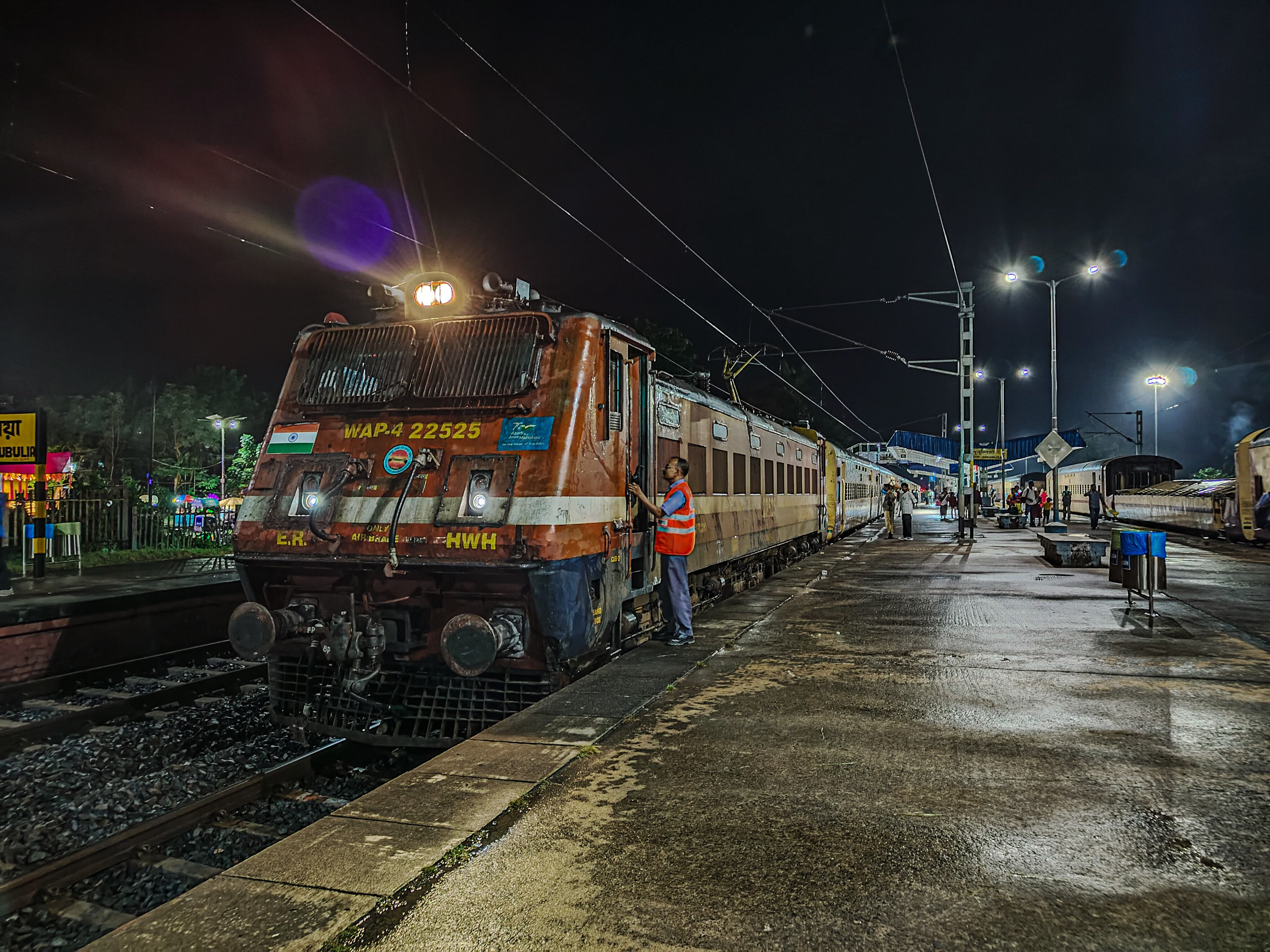
Howrah bound WAP-4 at Dhubulia railway station

== Livery ==
All WAP-4s are painted in the same red-black with a yellow/cream band livery, though the shade of the red differs from shed to shed, from the blazing crimson red or Green and Yellow (Sapthagiri) of Arakkonam(AJJ)/SR and wam 4 based liveries of Vijayawada(BZA)/SCOR to the orange of Erode ED/SR.

== Locomotive sheds ==
Zone	Shed Name	Code	Quantity
Central Railway	Bhusaval	BSLL	71
Eastern Railway	Howrah	HWHE	42
Eastern Railway	Howrah(D)	HWHD	38
East Central Railway	Pt. Deen Dayal Upadhyaya	DDUE	11
East Central Railway	Samastipur	SPJD	73
Northern Railway	Tughlakabad	TKDD	47
Northern Railway	Alambagh	AMVD	2
North Central Railway	Jhansi	JHSE	38
North Eastern Railway	Gorakhpur	GKPL	42
North Eastern Railway	Izzatnagar	IZNE	45
Southern Railway	Arakkonam	AJJE	83
Southern Railway	Erode(D)	EDDX	86
South Coast Railway	Vijayawada	BZAE	38
South Coast Railway	Guntakal	GTLE	25
South Eastern Railway	Santragachi	SRCE	60
Western Railway	Valsad	BLEE	21
Western Railway	Vatva	VTAD	40
Western Railway	Ratlam	RTMD	10
Total locomotives active as of November 2026			772

== See also ==
- Indian Railways
- Locomotives of India
- Rail transport in India
