= Surendranagar Gate railway station =

Railway station in Gujarat, India

General information
- Location: Surendranagar, Gujarat; India
- Coordinates: 22°44′04″N 71°38′12″E
- Elevation: 71 m (232.9 ft)
- System: Indian Railways station
- Owner: Ministry of Railways, Indian Railways
- Operator: Western Railway zone
- Line: Surendranagar–Bhavnagar line
- Platforms: 1
- Tracks: 1

Construction
- Parking: No
- Cycle facilities: No

Other information
- Status: Functioning
- Station code: SRGT
- Zone(s): Western Railway
- Division(s): Bhavnagar
Location
- Location within India Location within Gujarat

Surendranagar Gate railway station is a railway station serving in Surendranagar district of Gujarat state of India. It is under Bhavnagar railway division of Western Railway Zone of Indian Railways. Surendranagar Gate railway station is 1 km from Surendranagar Junction. Passenger, Express, and Superfast trains halt here.

== Trains ==
The following trains halt at Surendranagar Gate railway station in both directions:

- 12971/72 Bandra Terminus–Bhavnagar Terminus Express
- 17203/04 Bhavnagar Terminus–Kakinada Port Express
- 19107/08 Bhavnagar Terminus–Udhampur Janmabhoomi Express
- 19579/80 Bhavnagar Terminus–Delhi Sarai Rohilla Link Express

== See also ==
- Bhavnagar State Railway
