= Indian locomotive class WDS-4 =

Type and origin
- Power type: Diesel-hydraulic
- Builder: Chittaranjan Locomotive Works
- Build date: 1967–1990
- Total produced: WDS-4: 27; WDS-4A: 5; WDS-4B: 450+; WDS-4C: 7; WDS-4D: 120+; Total: 662
- Rebuilder: BLW
Specifications
- Configuration
  - Whyte: 0-6-0DH
  - UIC: C
- Gauge: 1,676 mm (5 ft 6 in)
- Loco weight: 60 tonnes (59 long tons; 66 short tons)
- Fuel type: Diesel
Performance figures
- Maximum speed: Mainline gear: 60–65 km/h (37–40 mph); Shunting: 25–38 km/h (16–24 mph)
- Power output: 600–700 hp (450–520 kW)
- Tractive effort: Mainline gear: 9,500–16,700 kgf (93,000–164,000 N; 21,000–37,000 lbf); Shunting: 18,000 kgf (180,000 N; 40,000 lbf)
Career
- Operators: Indian Railways
- Numbers: 19057…19732
- Locale: All over Indian Railways, some leased/sold to private industry

The WDS-4 (also known as Pappu) is a class of diesel-hydraulic locomotive used by Indian Railways for shunting and departmental operations. The model name stands for broad gauge (W), Diesel (D), Shunting (S) engine. The WDS-4 was once used all over India but most have now been scrapped or condemned from active service.

== Locomotive sheds ==
Zone	Name	Shed Code	Quantity
Northern Railway	Shakurbasti	SSB	1
	Rashtriya Chemical & Fertilizers	RCF	2
Total Locomotives in Service as of April 2023			3

== See also ==
- Rail transport in India § History
- Locomotives of India
- Rail transport in India

== Bibliography ==
- Hughes, Hugh (1996). Indian Locomotives: Part 4 – 1941–1990. Harrow, Middlesex: The Continental Railway Circle. p. 38. ISBN 0-9521655-1-1. OCLC 35135033.
