= Dholak ke Geet =

Indian folk song

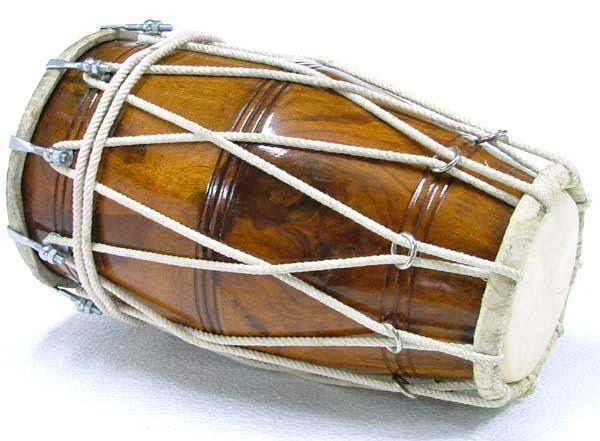
Dhol a musical instrument used in Dholak ke Geet

Dholak ke Geet is an Indian folk song style in the Dakhni language from Hyderabad Deccan, sung by Hyderabadi Muslim women during daily routine chores as well as during wedding and other festivities. The name "Dholak ke Geet" is derived from dholak which is the sole instrument used while singing. These songs are outcome of an 18th-century Sufi singing tradition called "Chakkinama" or "Chakkhi ke Geet" (chakkhi–mill and geet–songs), which were sung when women used to grind grains at the mills. In modern days Dholak ke Geet is performed during the five-day Hyderabadi wedding celebrations, childbirth and other familial gatherings. The Indian scholar Sameena Begum is attributed for reviving Dholak ke Geet, particularly through her research and her authored books titled Dholak ke Geeton ki Rivayat and Hyderabadi Dholak ke Geet. The women singers of Dholak ke Geet are called "mirasan" or "mirasaniya", meaning folk singers. Hafeeza Begum is a noted mirasan who is also attributed for promoting this form through her group of singers, Hafeeza Begum and Party.

== History ==
In the 18th century, the Sufi saints founded the predecessor of Chakkinama in an attempt to distract women from gossips. This tradition gradually shaped Dholak ke Geet after dholak was incorporated into singing. The songs started to be sung during engagements and wedding ceremonies, childbirth, festivities and other celebrations. Some of the popular classics of Dholak ke Geet are "Banne Tere Jebon ko Heere Lage," "Bhai Humare Hogaye Bhabi ke Deewane," "Gore Gore Hathon mein Mehndi Lagai," and "Mubarak Ho". Three decades prior to 2019, Dholak ke Geet was an integral part of social and cultural life in Hyderabad, fading thereafter slowly.

== Popular culture ==
The 1982 Hindi movie Bazaar featured Dholak ke Geet for the first time in any Bollywood movie.

== Bibliography ==
- Begum, Sameena (2019). Hyderabadi Dholak ke Geet.
