= Parasnath Express =

Train in India

Overview
- Service type: Superfast
- First service: 27 July 2003; 22 years ago
- Current operator: Western Railway

Route
- Termini: Bhavnagar Terminus (BVC); Asansol Junction (ASN)
- Stops: 29
- Distance travelled: 2,313 km (1,437 mi)
- Average journey time: 40 hours 20 minutes
- Service frequency: Weekly
- Train number: 12941 / 12942

On-board services
- Classes: AC 2 Tier, AC 3 Tier, Sleeper Class, General Unreserved
- Seating arrangements: Yes
- Sleeping arrangements: Yes
- Catering facilities: On-board catering, E-catering
- Observation facilities: Large windows
- Baggage facilities: Available
- Other facilities: Below the seats

Technical
- Rolling stock: LHB coach
- Track gauge: 1,676 mm (5 ft 6 in)
- Operating speed: 57 km/h (35 mph) average including halts.
Route map
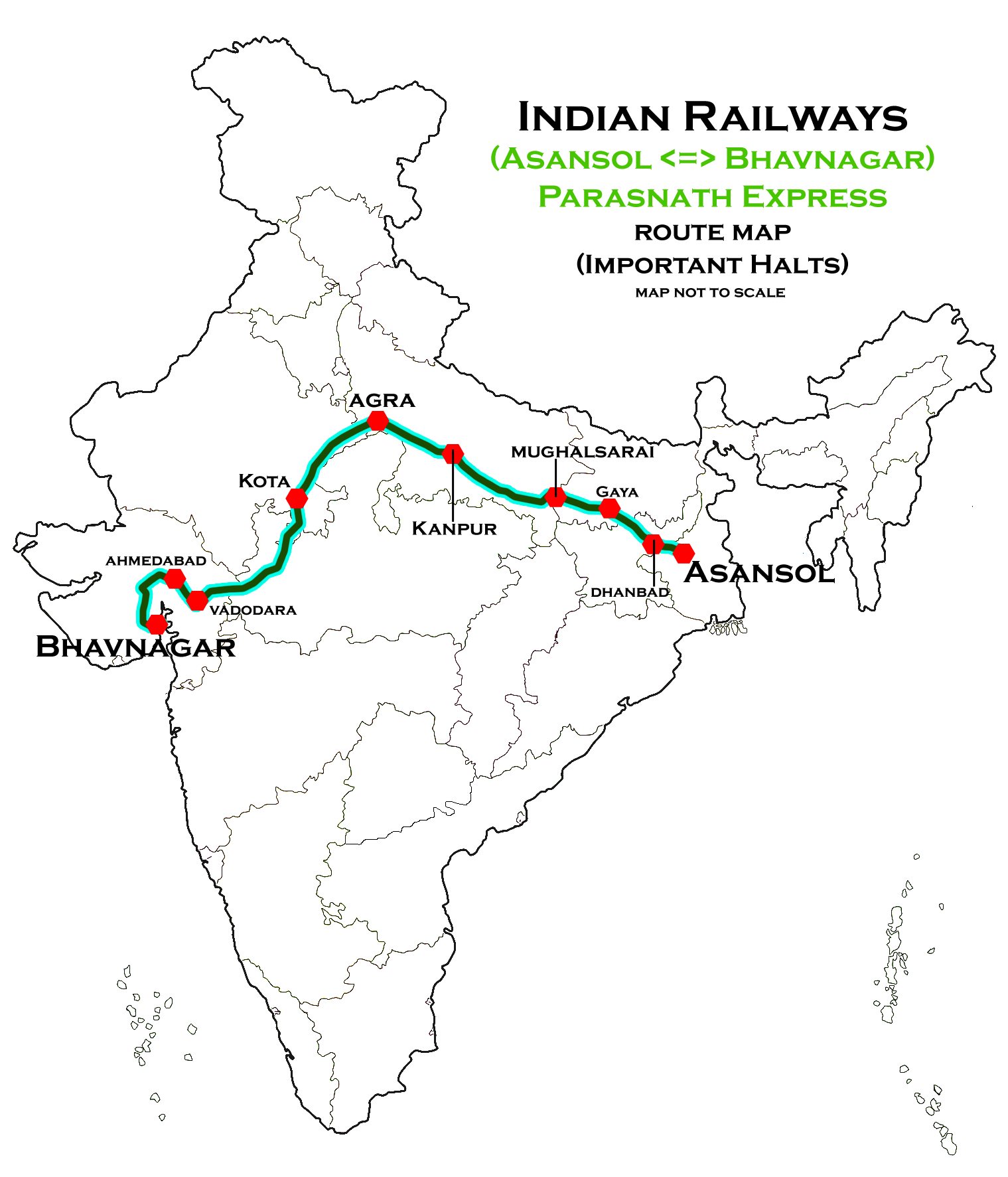

The 12941 / 12942 Parasnath Express is a superfast Express train belonging to Indian Railways Western Zone that runs between Bhavnagar Terminus and Asansol Junction in India. From 20 December, 2022, it runs with highly refurbished LHB coaches.

It operates as train number 12941 from Bhavnagar Terminus to Asansol and as train number 12942 in the reverse direction, serving the states of Gujarat, Madhya Pradesh, Rajasthan, Uttar Pradesh, Bihar, Jharkhand, and West Bengal.

== History ==
It was originally running between Ahmedabad and Dhanbad. First it was extended from Dhanbad to Asansol and then it was extended from Ahmedabad to Bhavnagar Terminus.

== Coaches ==
The 12941 / 42 Parasnath Express has 2 AC 2-tier, 6 AC 3-tier 8 sleeper class, four general unreserved, one EOG and one SLR (seating with luggage rake). It does not carry a pantry car coach.

As is customary with most train services in India, coach composition may be amended at the discretion of Indian Railways depending on demand.

== Service ==
The 12941 Bhavnagar Terminus–Asansol Junction Parasnath Express covers the distance of 2,311 km (1,436 mi) in 40 hours 20 mins (57 km/h) and in 37 hours 35 mins as the 12942 Asansol Junction–Bhavnagar Terminus Parasnath Express (62 km/h).

As the average speed of the train is above 55 km/h (34 mph), as per railway rules, its fare includes a Superfast surcharge.

== Route & halts ==
The 12941 / 12942 Parasnath Express runs from

- Bhavnagar Terminus
- Dhola Junction
- Botad Junction
- Viramgam
- Ahmedabad Junction
- Chhayapuri (Vadodara)
- Ratlam Junction
- Kota Junction
- Agra Fort
- Kanpur Central
- Prayagraj Junction
- Pt. Deen Dayal Upadhyaya Jn.
- Sasaram Junction
- Gaya Junction
- Koderma Junction
- Parasnath
- Dhanbad Junction
- Asansol Junction.

== Traction ==
It is hauled by a Vadodara Loco Shed-based WAP-5 / WAP-7 electric locomotive on its entire journey.

== Rake sharing ==
The train shares its rake with 22963/22964 Bandra Terminus–Bhavnagar Terminus Weekly Superfast Express.
