= Dholan Majra =

Coordinates: 30°48′N 76°30′E

Dholan Majra is a small village located near the city of Morinda, in the Ropar District (Rupnagar) of East Punjab, India.

The village was established in the late 19th century.

== History ==
Villagers were mainly engaged in agriculture, but by the mid-1950s, settlers from the western part of the Punjab, displaced by the Partition of India, caused the population to expand.

== Geography ==
The village is situated in a fertile, alluvial plain, surrounded by both rivers and an extensive irrigation canal system. The Shiwalik Hills extend along the northeastern part at the foot of the Himalaya mountains. The average elevation is 300m above sea level, ranging from 180m in the southwest to more than 500m around the northeast border.

== Demographics ==
According to the 2011 Indian Census, the population of Dholan Majra is 394. The literacy rate in village is 81%, male literacy being 80.23% and female literacy 78.36%.

== Religion ==
Sikhism is the predominant faith in the village.

== Sikh Reference Library ==
The two-story library was established alongside the newly built Gurudwara Singh Shaheeda Sahib. The library contains religious literature and books on the history of Sikhism.
