= Dholai Port =

Port in Gujarat, India

Coordinates: 20°44′20″N 72°53′50″E

Dholai Port is a fishing port located in the Bilimora taluka of Gujarat, India. It is situated on the coast of the Arabian Sea, about 20 kilometers from the town of Bilimora. The port was built in 1995 and is operated by the Gujarat Maritime Board.
