= Bhavnagar Para railway station =

Railway station in Gujarat, India

General information
- Location: Bhavnagar, Gujarat; India
- Coordinates: 21°46′14″N 72°07′07″E
- Elevation: 17 metres (56 ft)
- System: Indian Railways station
- Owner: Indian Railways
- Operator: Western Railway
- Line: Surendranagar–Bhavnagar line
- Platforms: 2
- Tracks: 3
- Connections: Auto stand

Construction
- Structure type: Standard (on ground station)
- Parking: Yes
- Cycle facilities: Yes

Other information
- Status: Functioning
- Station code: BVP
- Zone(s): Western Railway
- Division(s): Bhavnagar

History
- Opened: 1880
- Former names: Bhavnagar State Railway
Location
- Location within India Location within Gujarat

Bhavnagar railway station is a small railway station in Bhavnagar district, Gujarat. Its code is BVP. It serves Bhavnagar city. The station consists of two platforms. The platforms are not well sheltered. It lacks many facilities including water and sanitation.

== Trains ==
Some of the trains that run from Bhavnagar Para are:

- Bhavnagar-Sabarmati Intercity SF express
- Bandra Terminus–Bhavnagar Superfast Express
- Okha–Bhavnagar Passenger
- Mahuva–Bhavnagar Passenger
- Palitana–Bhavnagar Passenger
- Surendranagar–Bhavnagar Fast Passenger
- Bhavnagar–Botad Passenger
- Bhavnagar-Haridwar Weekly Express
- Bandra Terminus - Kakinada (Weekly Superfast Express)
- Bandra Terminus - Delhi Rohilla (Weekly- Tuesday)
- Bandra Terminus - Asansol (Weekly- Tuesday)
- Bandra Terminus - Surendranagar
