= Electric Loco Shed, Vadodara =

Loco shed in Gujarat, India

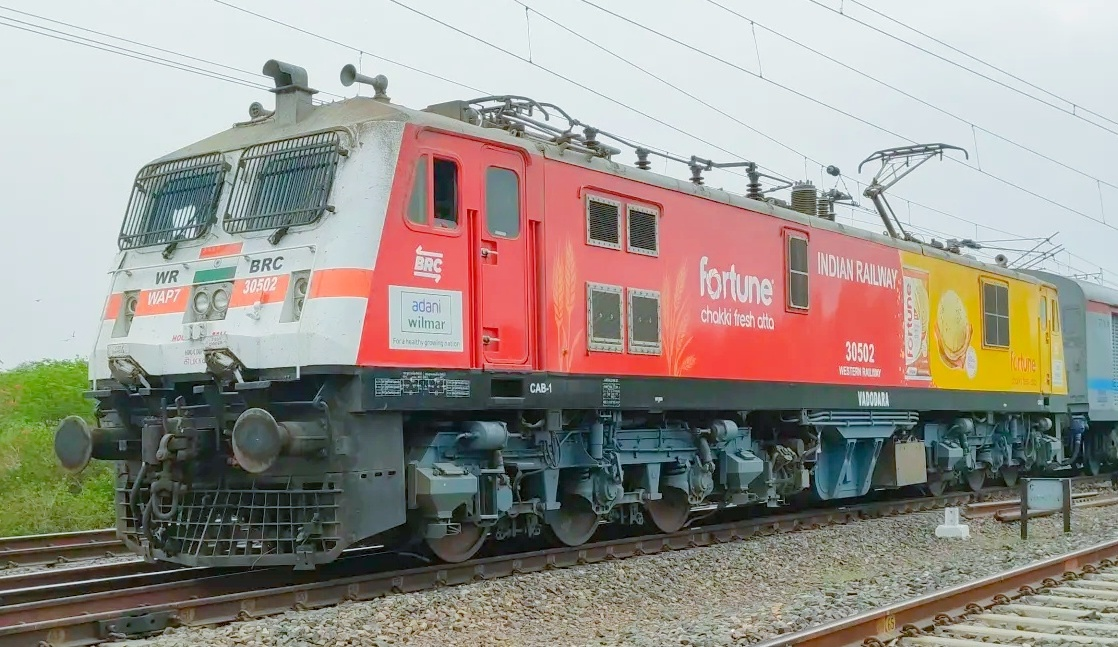
- Vadodara based Fortune Chakki Fresh Atta advertised WAP-7 at Bilimora

- Location within Gujarat

Location
- Location: Vadodara, Gujarat
- Coordinates: 22°18′39″N 73°10′51″E

Characteristics
- Owner: Indian Railways
- Operator: Western Railway zone
- Depot code: BRC
- Type: Electric engine shed
- Roads: 7
- Rolling stock: WAP-5; WAP-7; WAG-9; EF12K
- Routes served: Ahmedabad–Mumbai main line Mathura–Vadodara section Ahmedabad–Delhi main line Rajkot-Somnath line Viramgam-Okha line

History
- Opened: 1970; 56 years ago
- Former rolling stock: WAM-4; WAP-4; WAG-5

Electric Loco Shed, Vadodara is an electric engine shed located in Vadodara, in the Indian state of Gujarat. It is located south of Vadodara railway station.It falls under the Vadodara railway division of Western Railway. It is the largest locomotive shed in the Western Railway zone.

== History ==
This shed was established on 25 March 1973, specifically to home dual-power locos. It holds more than 50 WAG-5 class locomotives.

It is an AC electric trip shed to house locos coming from other sheds, and an AC/DC dual loco trip shed which houses WCAM class locomotives from Valsad Shed. This allows locomotive changes at Vadodara because the trains which were coming from New Delhi mainline are AC locomotives and the trains going to Mumbai need AC/DC loco.

After the AC conversion of Western Railway, WCAM-1 and WCAM-2/2P fleet were transferred to Central Railway's Kalyan Loco Shed. WCAM-1s were gradually condemned and are now out of service.

== Livery and markings ==
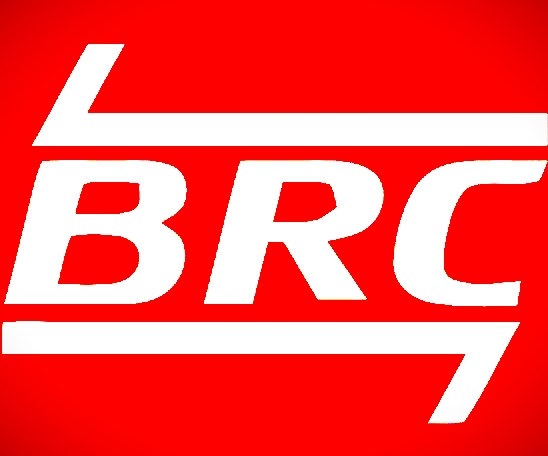
Logo of Electric Loco Shed, Vadodara

BRC WAP-5 & WAP-7 has three brand advertisements: Amul Milk, Fortune Edible Oils & Chakki Fresh Atta, and Joy Electric Bike. These are painted on the loco's body side.

BRC loco shed has its own stencils. It is written in Hindi and English on loco's front side, rear side and lower bodyside.

== Locomotives ==
Serial No.	Locomotive class	Horsepower	Quantity
1	WAP-5	6120	50
2	WAP-7	6350	131
3	WAG-9	6120	141
4	EF12K	12000	2
Total locomotives active as of November 2026			324

== See also ==
- Electric Loco Shed, Valsad
- Diesel Loco Shed, Vatva
- Diesel Loco Shed, Sabarmati
- Diesel Loco Shed, Ratlam
