= Electric Loco Shed, Valsad =

Loco shed in Gujarat, India

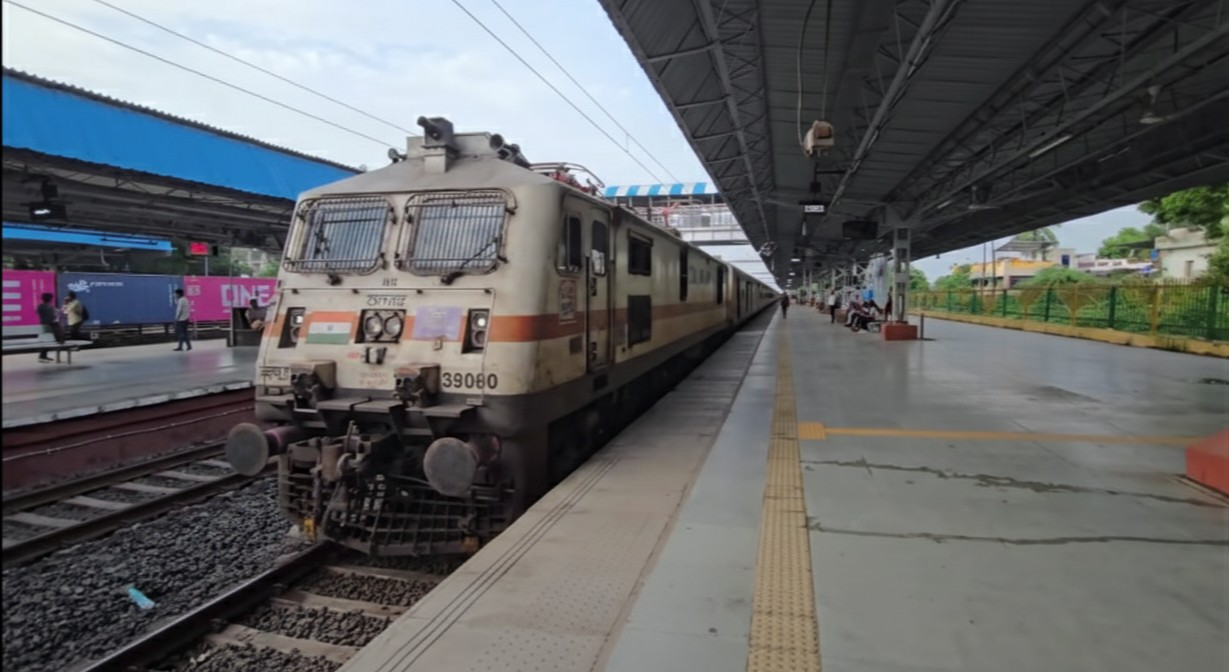
- Valsad based WAP-7 at Ankleshwar.

- Location within Gujarat

Location
- Location: Valsad, Gujarat
- Coordinates: 20.610°N 72.926°E

Characteristics
- Owner: Indian Railways
- Operator: Western Railways
- Depot code: BL
- Type: Electric engine shed
- Roads: 6
- Rolling stock: WAP-4; WAP-5; WAP-7; WAG-9
- Routes served: Ahmedabad–Mumbai main line

History
- Opened: 1970; 56 years ago
- Former rolling stock: WAM-4; WCAM-1; WCAM-2P; WAG-5; WAG-7

Electric Loco Shed, Valsad is an electric engine shed located in Valsad, in the Indian state of Gujarat. It is located to south of Valsad railway station, it falls under the Mumbai WR railway division of Western Railway. It is the largest of locomotive sheds in the Western Railway zone.

== History ==
It was established in the 1970s specifically to home dual-power locos. It holds more than 50 WAG-5 class locomotives. Post AC conversion of Western Railway, few WAG-5, and all WCAM-2P fleet were transferred to Central Railway's Kalyan Loco Shed, and the WCAM-2Ps were later reclassified as WCAM-2. WCAM-1 were slowly condemned and later, all units of this class got scrapped by 2015. The shed received WAG-7 in 2013 but however, it transferred them to Ratlam Loco Shed in order to make space for the newer WAG-9 locomotives. The shed also received WAP-4 locomotives from Vadodara Loco Shed.

The shed houses over 100 electric locomotives. It was the only loco shed on Western Railway which had housed the AC/DC locomotives, like WCAM-1 and WCAM-2P and one of the only two in India; the other being Kalyan Loco Shed on Central Railway to house AC/DC dual powered electric locomotives. Recently many WAG-5/5As have been homed at Valsad which are pure AC locomotives.

== Locomotives ==
Serial No.	Locomotive Class	Horsepower	Quantity
1.	WAP-4	5350	21
2.	WAP-5	6120	2
3.	WAP-7	6350	92
4.	WAG-9	6120	132
Total locomotives active as of November 2026			247

== See also ==
- Electric Loco Shed, Vadodara
- Diesel Loco Shed, Vatva
- Diesel Loco Shed, Sabarmati
- Diesel Loco Shed, Ratlam
