= Diesel Loco Shed, Vatva =

Loco shed in Gujarat, India

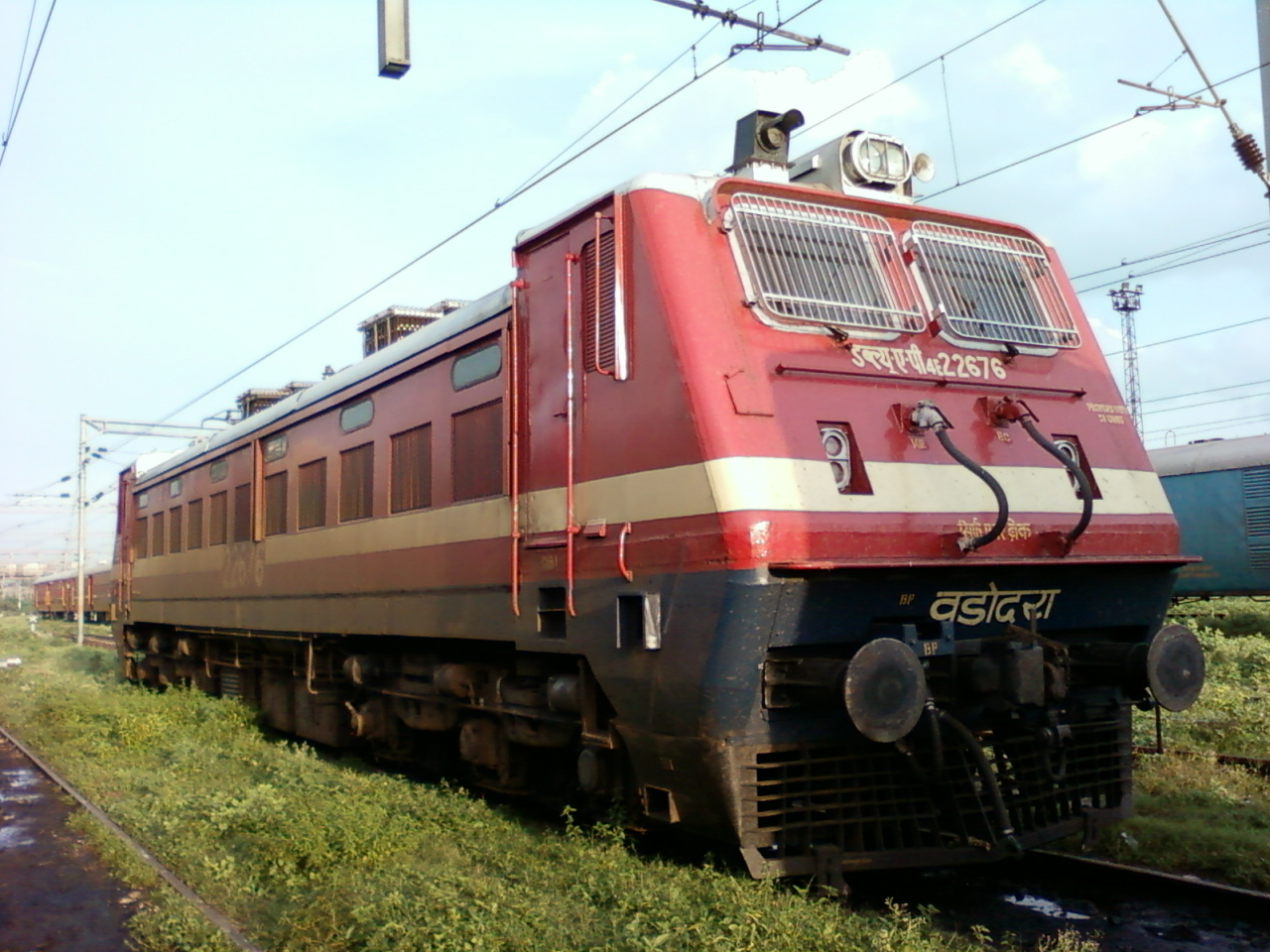
- Vatva based WAP-4E (ex. BRC) at Ahmedabad.

- Location within Gujarat

Location
- Location: Vatva, Ahmedabad, Gujarat
- Coordinates: 22°57′32″N 72°37′46″E

Characteristics
- Owner: Indian Railways
- Operator: Western Railway zone
- Depot code: VTA
- Type: Engine shed
- Rolling stock: WAP-4; WAG-9

History
- Opened: 9 November 1981; 44 years ago

Diesel Loco Shed, Vatva is an engine shed located in Vatva, Gujarat in India. It is located north-east of Vatva falling under Ahmedabad railway division. The shed caters to the need of freight as well as passenger trains.

It is one of the three diesel loco sheds in the Western Railway zone, others are Ratlam and Sabarmati. While it is named as "Diesel loco shed", it now only houses electric locomotives.

== Livery and markings ==
Vatva DLS has its own logo and stencils. It is written on loco's body side as well as front & back side.

== History ==
It was established on 11 November 1981 with capacity holding of 15 locomotives, but currently it holds around 126 locomotives, WDM-3D, WDG-3A, WDM-3A, WDS-6 and WDS-4B class. It received its first locomotive, a WDM-2, from Diesel Loco Shed, Ratlam.

Major and minor schedules of Diesel Locomotives are carried out in the shed. The shed is ISO: ISO 9002:1994, ISO 9001:2000, ISO 9001:2008 certified.

== Locomotives ==
Serial No.	Locomotive Class	Horsepower	Quantity
1.	WAP-4	5050	40
2.	WAG-9	6120	155
Total Locomotives Active as of November 2026			195

== See also ==
- Diesel Loco Shed, Mhow
- Diesel Loco Shed, Sabarmati
- Diesel Loco Shed, Ratlam
- Electric Loco Shed, Vadodara
- Electric Loco Shed, Valsad
