= Khari, Nepal =

Khari खरी
- Village development committee
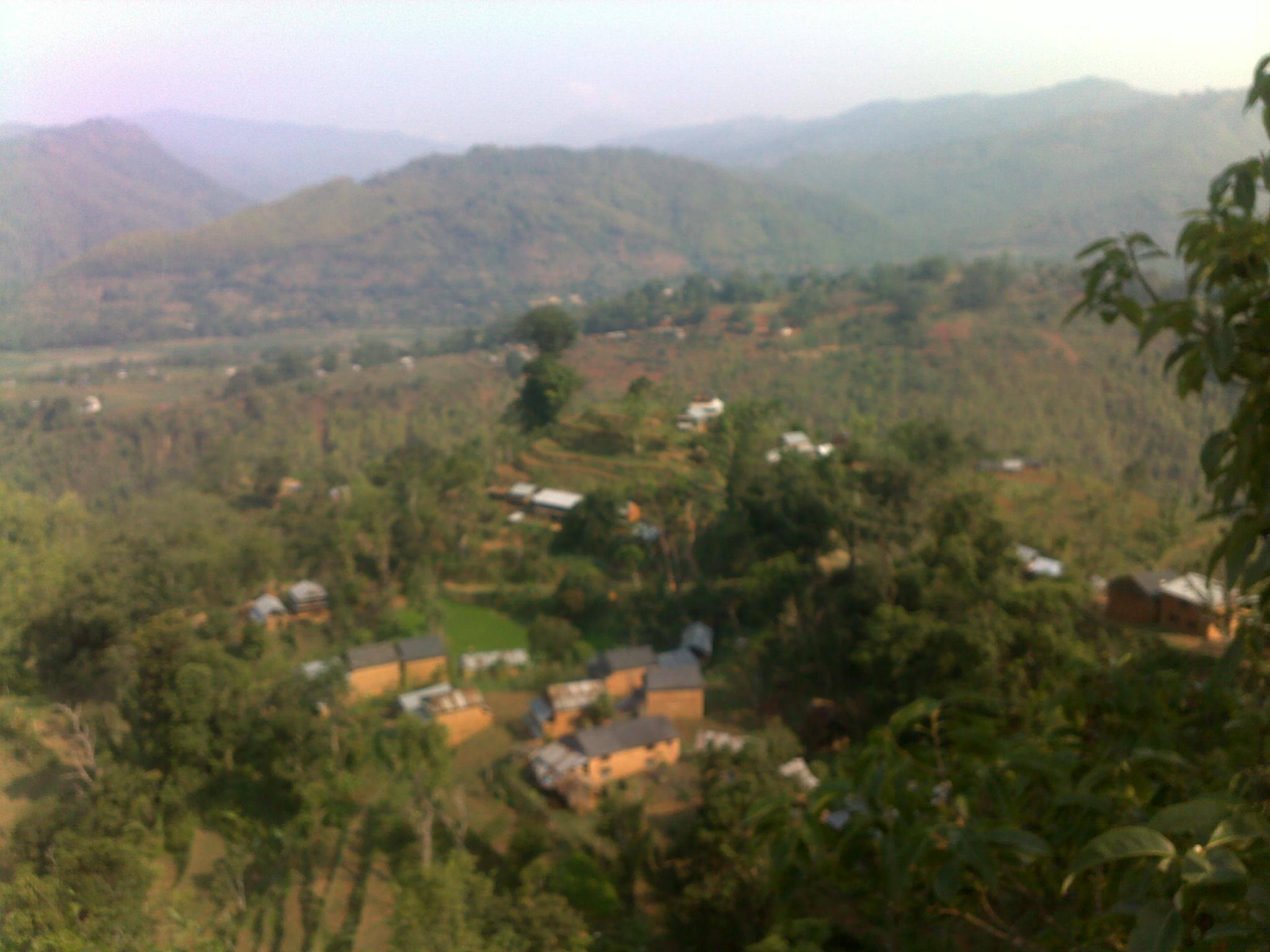

- Location in Nepal
- Coordinates: 27°56′17″N 84°46′39″E
- Country: Nepal
- Zone: Bagmati Zone
- District: Dhading District

Population (1991)
  - Total: 3,910
  - Religions: Hindu
- Time zone: UTC+5:45 (Nepal Time)

Khari is a village development committee in Dhading District in the Bagmati Zone of central Nepal. At the time of the 1991 Nepal census it had a population of 3910 and had 748 houses in it.
