= Dhola, Nepal =

Dhola, Nepal ढोला
- Village development committee
- Location in Nepal
- Coordinates: 27.92°N 84.83°E
- Country: Nepal
- Zone: Bagmati Zone
- District: Dhading District

Population (2011)
  - Total: 4,033
  - Religions: Hindu
- Time zone: UTC+5:45 (Nepal Time)

Dhola, Nepal is a village development committee in Dhading District in the Bagmati Zone of central Nepal. It is situated high up the Himalayas in the Annapurna and Manaslu Mountain range in the mid-western Nepal at an altitude of 1210 m above the sea level. At the time of the 2011 Nepal census it had a population of 4,033 and had 998 houses in it. Where total population of Male and Female are 1,772 and 2,261 respectively.
