= Dhola, Gujarat =

Dhola
- Census town
- Location in Gujarat, India Dhola (India)
- Coordinates: 21.88°N 71.78°E
- Country: India
- State: Gujarat
- District: Bhavnagar

Government
  - Body: Nagar Palika
- Elevation: 56 m (184 ft)

Population (2001)
  - Total: 8,049

Languages
  - Official: Gujarati, Hindi
- Time zone: UTC+5:30 (IST)
- Postal code: 364320
- Vehicle registration: GJ
- Website: gujaratindia.com

Dhola is a census town and former petty Rajput princely state in Bhavnagar district, in the state of Gujarat, western India.

== History ==
Dhola was one of many non-salute states in Gohilwad prant on Saurashtra peninsula, comprising only the village. Under the British Raj], the colonial Eastern Kathiawar Agency was in charge of it.

In 1901 it comprised only the village, with a population of 261, yielding 1,800 Rupees state revenue (1903-4, all from land), paying 384 Rupees tribute to the Gaikwar Baroda State and Junagadh State.

== Geography ==
Dhola is located at 21.88°N 71.78°E. It has an average elevation of 56 metres (183 feet).

Dhola is a Railway Junction in Bhavnagar State Railway.

== Demographics ==
As of 2001 India census, Dhola had a population of 8049.

- Males constitute 52% of the population and females 48%.
- Dhola has an average literacy rate of 67%, higher than the national average of 59.5%: male literacy is 75% and, female literacy is 58%.
- In Dhola, 14% of the population is under 6 years of age.

== External links and Sources ==
- Imperial Gazetteer, on DSAL.UChicago.edu - Kathiawar
