= Bhavnagar Terminus railway station =

Railway station in Gujarat, India

Bhavnagar Terminus

General information
- Location: Bhavnagar, Gujarat; India
- Coordinates: 21°46′54″N 72°08′32″E
- Elevation: 11 m (36.1 ft)
- System: Indian Railway station
- Owner: Ministry of Railways; Indian Railways
- Operator: Western Railway
- Line: Surendranagar-Bhavnagar line
- Platforms: 3
- Tracks: 4

Construction
- Structure type: Standard on ground
- Parking: Yes
- Cycle facilities: Yes

Other information
- Status: Operating
- Station code: BVC
- Zone(s): Western Railway zone
- Division(s): Bhavnagar

History
- Opened: 1880; 146 years ago
- Electrified: August 2022; 4 years ago
Location
- Location within Gujarat Location within India

Bhavnagar Terminus railway station (station code:- BVC) is a railway station serving Bhavnagar town, in Bhavnagar district of the Indian state of Gujarat. It is under Bhavnagar railway division of Western Railway zone of Indian Railways. Bhavnagar Terminus is "A" category station of Bhavnagar railway division of Western Railway zone. As of 2022, a single electric broad-gauge railway line exists.

Bhavnagar Terminus is well connected by rail to Udhampur, Kakinada Port, Kochuveli, Dhanbad Junction, Asansol Junction, Bandra Terminus, Surendranagar Junction, Botad Junction, Palitana, Mahuva Junction, Veraval Junction, Porbandar, Sabarmati Junction, Haridwar, Ajmer Junction, Jaipur Junction, Lucknow Charbagh, Ayodhya Cantt, and Okha. Total 20 trains start from here.

== Major trains ==
Following major trains start from Bhavnagar station:

- 12755/56 Bhavnagar Terminus–Kakinada Port Express
- 19259/60 Kochuveli–Bhavnagar Express
- 12941/42 Parasnath Express
- 22964/63 Bhavnagar Terminus–Bandra Terminus Weekly Superfast Express.
- 12971/72 Bandra Terminus–Bhavnagar Terminus Superfast Express
- 19107/08 Bhavnagar Terminus–Udhampur Janmabhoomi Express
- 19272/71 Bhavnagar Terminus–Haridwar Weekly Express
- 20966/65 Bhavnagar Terminus–Sabarmati Intercity Express
- 19201/02 Bhavnagar Terminus–Ayodhya Cantt Weekly Express

== See also ==
- Bhavnagar State Railway
