= Indian locomotive class WAP-5 =

Indian Railway passenger class high-speed electric locomotive

WAP-5
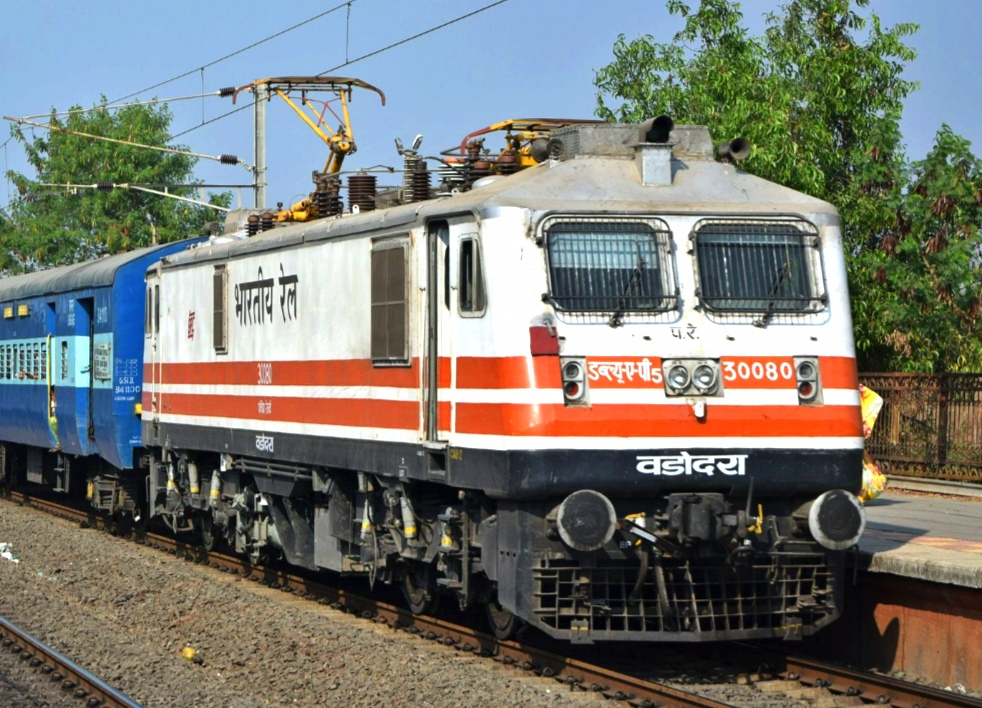
- Vadodara based WAP-5 hauling Gujarat Express
Type and origin
- Power type: Electric
- Builder: Chittaranjan Locomotive Works (India); Adtranz (Switzerland)
- Model: Lok 2000
- Build date: 1995–2024
- Total produced: 249 (Production has been stopped)
Specifications
- Configuration
  - UIC: Bo'Bo'
- Gauge: 5 ft 6 in (1,676 mm)
- Bogies: Henschel Flexifloat
- Wheel diameter: New: 1,092 mm (3 ft 7 in); Half-worn: 1,054 mm (3 ft 5 1/2 in); Full-worn: 1,016 mm (3 ft 4 in)
- Wheelbase: 13,000 mm (42 ft 8 in)
- Length: 18,162 mm (59 ft 7 in)
- Width: 3,142 mm (10 ft 3 3/4 in)
- Height: 4,237 mm (13 ft 11 in)
- Axle load: 19.5 tonnes (19.2 long tons; 21.5 short tons)
- Loco weight: 78 tonnes (77 long tons; 86 short tons)
- Electric system/s: 25 kV 50 Hz AC overhead
- Current pickup: Pantograph
- Traction motors: 4 ABB 6FXA 7059
- Gear ratio: 67:35:17 (160 km/h); 59:35:19 (180 km/h)
- MU working: 2
- Loco brake: Air and regenerative
- Train brakes: Air
- Safety systems: TPWS (Train Protection and Warning System), vigilance control, slip/slide control, main overload relay, no volt relay, over voltage protection and earth fault relay
Performance figures
- Maximum speed: Operational: 160 km/h (99 mph); Trials: 184 km/h (114 mph); WAP-5A: 200 km/h (124 mph)
- Power output: 6,000 hp (4,474 kW)
- Tractive effort: Starting: 258 kN (58,000 lb_{f})
Career
- Operators: Indian Railways
- Numbers: 30000-30200, 35001-35052
- Delivered: 1995-1996
- First run: 1997
- Disposition: Active

The Indian locomotive class WAP-5 is a class of electric locomotives used by Indian Railways. The first ten locomotives were imported from Adtranz in Switzerland in 1995; locomotives were later manufactured by Chittaranjan Locomotive Works in India.

The locomotive has regenerative braking, flexible gear coupling, wheel-mounted disc brakes, and a potential for speed enhancement to 200 km/h (120 mph). Braking systems include 160 kN (36,000 lbf) regenerative brakes, disc brakes, automatic train air brakes and a charged spring parking brake.

On 3 July 2014, a WAP-5 locomotive set an Indian rail speed record by hauling a passenger train between Delhi and Agra at 160 km/h (99 mph) during a trial run, completing the 200 km journey in about 90 minutes.

== Locomotive sheds ==
Zone	Name	Shed code	Quantity		Introduction year
Zone	Name	Shed code	WAP-5	WAP-5AB	Introduction year
Central Railway	Kalyan	KYNE		8	2025
Eastern Railway	Howrah	HWHE	15	16	2019
East Central Railway	Gomoh	GMOE		6	2026
Northern Railway	Ghaziabad	GZBE	59	45	1997
North Eastern Railway	Gorakhpur	GKPL		20	2026
Southern Railway	Erode	EDE		10	2025
Southern Railway	Royapuram	RPME		8	2025
South Central Railway	Lallaguda	LGDE		8	2026
South Western Railway	Krishnarajapuram	KJMD		2	2026
Western Railway	Vadodara	BRCE	34	16	2011
Western Railway	Valsad	BLEE		2	2025
Total			108	141	
Total locomotives active as of November 2026			249		

== Variants ==
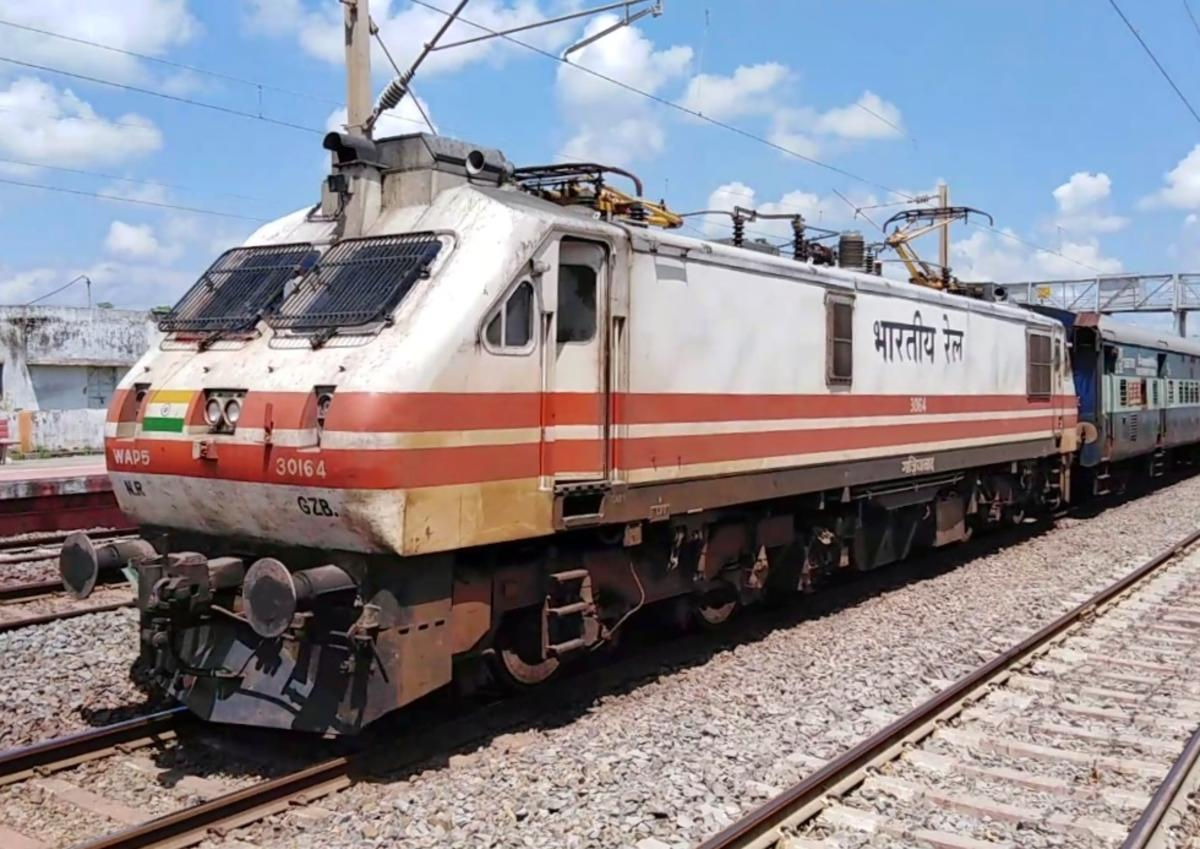
Aerodynamic Ghaziabad WAP-5 #30164 hauling the Rupashi Bangla Express

In October 2015, a WAP-5A locomotive (No. 30086) was rolled out with a gear ratio of 59:35:19, enabling it to attain speeds of up to 200 km/h (120 mph) during trial runs. In March 2018, a WAP-5 locomotive (No. 30136) with an enhanced power output of 4,500 kilowatts (6,000 hp) was rolled out. Following successful trials, this upgraded power output was adopted as the standard specification for the class. Some locomotives of this class are equipped with "Head On Generation" (HOG), in which electric power from the locomotive's pantograph is transferred to the coaches instead of "End Of Generation", where a power car equipped with a diesel generator is provided at either end of the train rake to supply power.

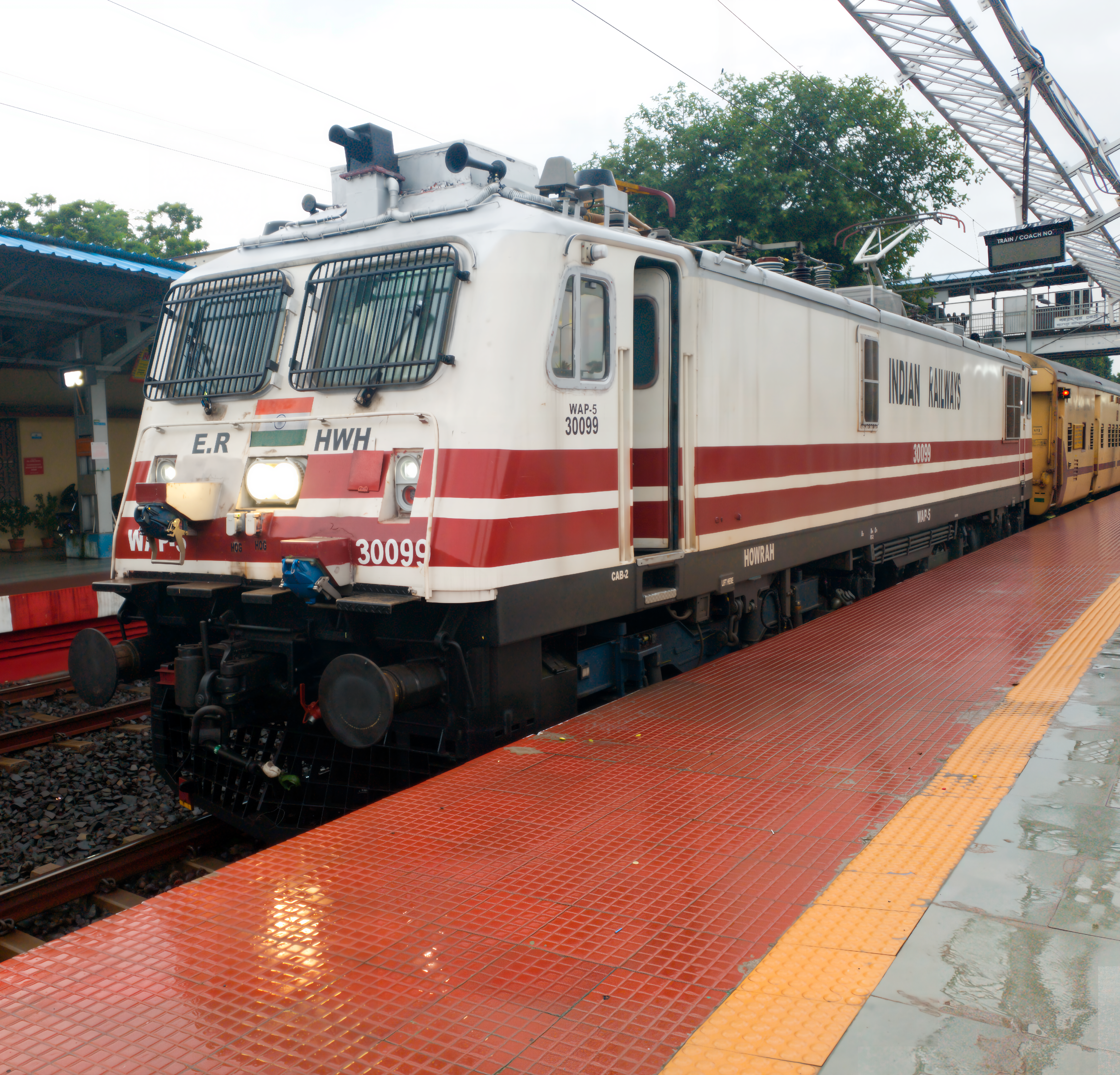
A standard livery Howrah based HoG equipped WAP-5 standing at Berhampore Court

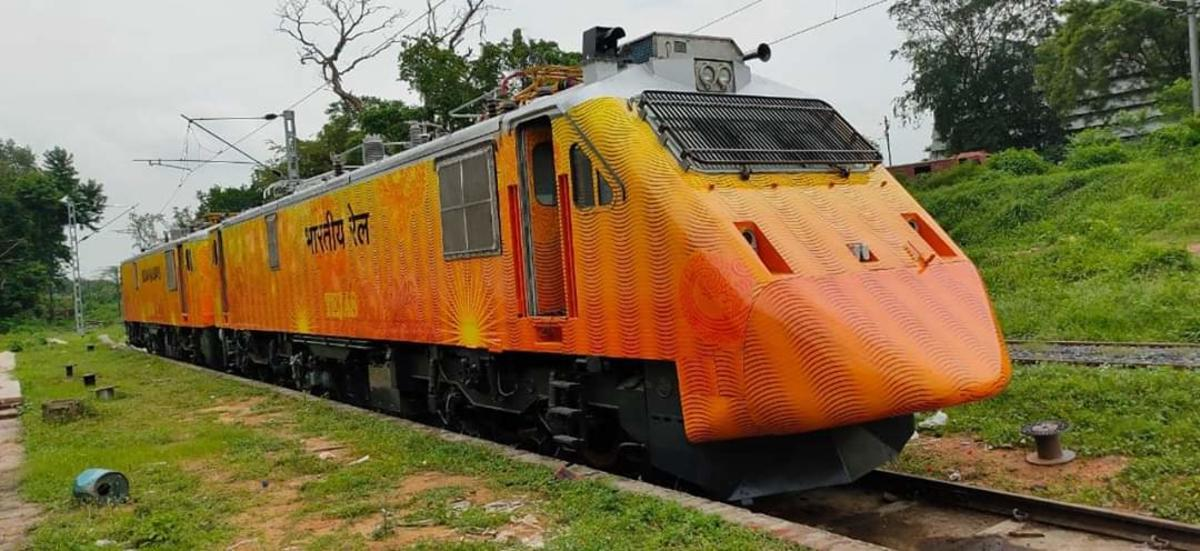
A Tejas Express livery WAP-5s at CLW yard, Chittaranjan

In October 2020, two WAP-5 locomotives (Nos. 35012 and 35013) were unveiled with an asymmetric body design featuring an aerodynamic profile at one end and a blunt profile at the other. They were intended to be semi-permanently coupled with a train in a push-pull configuration for Tejas Express services. Both locomotives have a power output of 6,000 horsepower (4,500 kW) and a maximum speed of 160 kilometres per hour (99 mph). Two similarly modified WAP-5 locomotives (Nos. 35027 and 35028) are used to haul the Amrit Bharat Express in a comparable push-pull configuration.

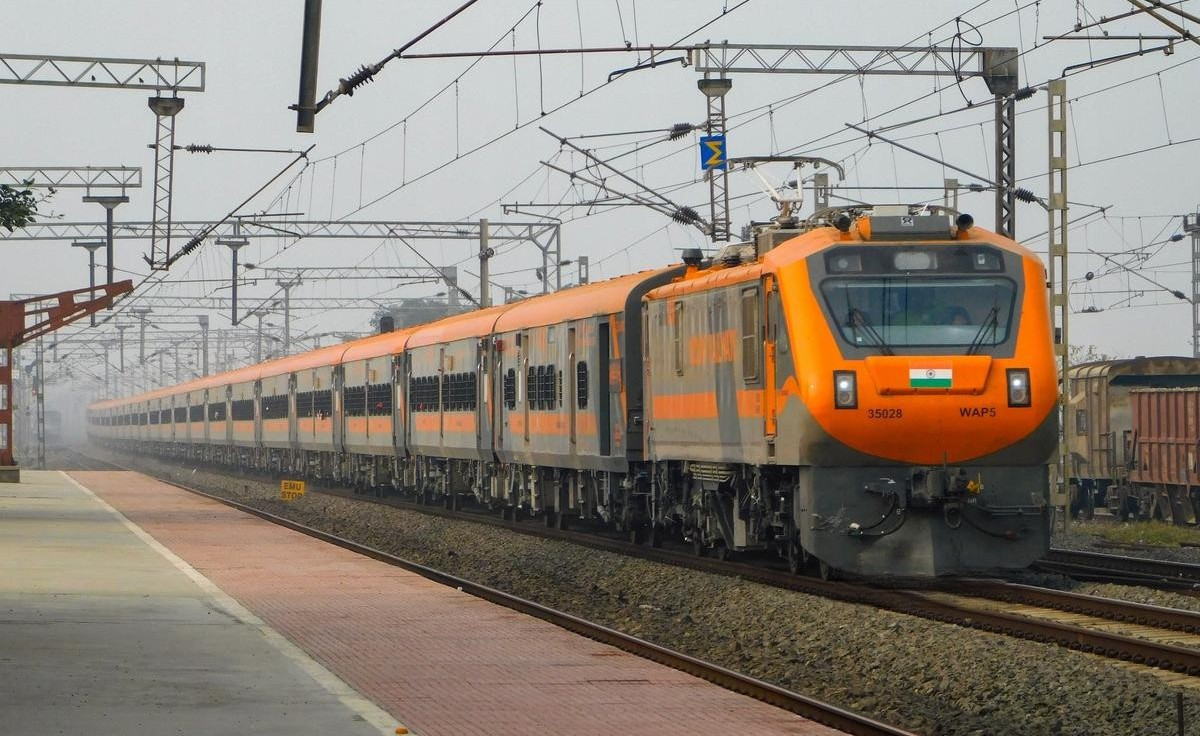
A WAP-5s locomotive in Amrit Bharat Express livery

== Technical specifications ==
A WAP-5 locomotive can accelerate a 24-coach passenger rake weighing 1,430 tonnes to 110 km/h in 312.1 seconds over a distance of 6 km, to 120 km/h in 402 seconds over 6.9 km, and to 130 km/h in 556 seconds over 14.2 km. Specifications are as follows:

Technical specifications
General information
Gauge	Broad gauge 1,676 mm (5 ft 6 in)
Line voltage	25000 V
Type of current	Alternating current (AC)
Axle load	19.5 tonnes (19.2 long tons; 21.5 short tons)
AAR classification	Bo-Bo
Length over head-stocks	16,880 mm (55 ft 4 5/8 in)
Length over buffers	18,162 mm (59 ft 7 in)
Bogie wheel base	2,800 mm (9 ft 2 1/4 in)
Wheel base	13,000 mm (42 ft 7 3/4 in)
Body width	3,142 mm (10 ft 3 3/4 in)
Cab length	2,434 mm (7 ft 11 7/8 in)
Pantograph locked down height	4,237 mm (13 ft 10 3/4 in)
Bogie center distance	10,200 mm (33 ft 5 5/8 in)
Height over pantograph	4,237 mm (13 ft 10 3/4 in)
Body width	3,142 mm (10 ft 3 3/4 in)
Coupling	Central buffer couplers (CBC)
Surface	Corrugated or plain
Traction motors
Type	6FXA 7059 3-phase asynchronous motors, 1,166 kW (1,563 hp), 2180 V, 370 A continuous, 396 A for 1 hr, 540 A max, 1585 rpm continuous, 3174 rpm max, weight 1990 kg. Forced-air ventilation, partly suspended. Torque 6930/10000 N-m. 96% efficiency.
Make	ABB
Traction motors insulation	Class 200
Traction motor's short time overload rating	1150 kW, 1540 V, 540 A, 1107 rpm
Traction motor's 1 hour rating	1150 kW, 2044 V, 396 A, 1485 rpm
Traction motor's continuous rating	1150 kW, 2180 V, 370 A, 1585 rpm
Number of traction motors	4
Gear ratio	67:35:17 (160 km/h or 99 mph); 59:35:19 (200 km/h or 120 mph)
Transformer
Type	ABB LOT-7500/LOT-7775: {7475 kVA/7775 kVA, 25 kV, 299A-primary/311A}-primary, {4x1269 V, 4x1450 kVA, 4x1142 A}-secondary, {1000 V, 334 kVA, 334 A}-auxiliary, {960 V, 2x622.5 kVA, 2x648 A}- hotel load and {1154 V, 400 kVA, 347 A}-filter
Transformer insulation	Class A
Make	ABB, HI VOLT, BHEL
Weight	10000 +/-3% kg
Power converter
Number of converters	2
Semiconductors	GTO thyristors / IGBT
GTO	Type : UW-2423-2810; SG 3000G X H24 GTO thyristors (D 921S45 T diodes), 14 thyristors per unit (two units). Line converter rated at 2 x 1269 V @ 50 Hz, with DC link voltage of 2800 V. Drive converter rated at 2180 V phase to phase, 953 A output current *per phase, motor frequency from 0 to 160.3 Hz.
IGBT	IGBT type 5SNA 1200G450300 2105 kW, individual axle control configuration, MITRAC software, water cooled. Newer locomotives have IGBT based propulsion system.
Hotel load converter
Make	BHEL / ABB
Rating	2x500 kVA
Voltage	750 V +/- 5%, 3 phase
Bogie
Type	Bo-Bo Henschel Flexifloat bogies with quill drive. Bogie center distance 10,200 mm (33.5 ft); bogie wheelbase 2,800 mm (9.2 ft): Unsprung mass per axle: 2.691 t; This locomotive has a fully suspended drive.
Drive arrangement	Gear coupling and 3-stage gears
Design	2-axle fabricated
Primary suspension	coil
Secondary suspension	coil
Pantograph
Type	Two Stone India (Calcutta) AM-92, two WBL-85, two Schunk for the imported locomotives
Pantograph weight	231 kg
Other information
2 FLAKT ABB traction motor blowers	3.6 cubic meter per sec
Landert traction motor blower motor	3 phase, 415 V, 50 Hz, 2930 rpm, 25 kW
200L55-RFXH2A-01 traction motor blower motor insulation	Class F
2 oil cooler blowers	8.8 cubic meter per sec
Landert oil cooler blower motor	3 phase, 415 V, 50 Hz,2930 rpm, 25 kW
200L55-RH2A oil cooler blower motor insulation	Class F
2 Howden Safanco scavenge blowers for traction motors and oil cooler blower	0.664 cubic meter per sec
Landert scavenge blower motor for traction motors and oil cooler	3 phase, 415 V, 50 Hz, 2850 rpm, 3 kW
100L28-R2C scavenge motor blower motor insulation	Class H
2 transformer oil pumps by Plumeliaz	1000 liters per minute
Landert transformer oil pump motor	3-phase, 415 V, 50 Hz, 2850 rpm, 4.7 kW
112M-2B type transformer oil pump motor insulation	Class F
2 converter oil pumps by Plumeliaz	960 liters per minute
Converter oil pump motor by Landert	3-phase, 415 V, 50 Hz, 2860 rpm, 11 kW
112M-2F type converter oil pump motor insulation	Class F
2 main compressors by D&M	1 kg/cm^{2}
Main compressor motor by Landert	3-phase, 415 V, 50 Hz, 730 rpm, 15 kW
200155-RPAH8B main compressor motor insulation	Class H
2 machine room blowers by Flakt and ABB	1 cubic meter per sec.
Machine room blower motor by Landert	1-phase, 415 V, 50 Hz, 2830 rpm, 2.6 kW
132M-RFXHE2C type machine room blower motor insulation	Class F
Scavenge blower for machine room blower by Howden Safanco	0.1 cubic meter per sec.
Scavenge blower motor for machine room blower by Landert	1-phase, 415 V, 50 Hz, 2910 rpm, 0.75 kW
9DL24-RE2C type scavenge blower motor for machine room blower insulation	Class F
Auxiliary compressor by D&M and Bristol	141.6 ft per min., 7.03 kg per cm^{2}.
Auxiliary compressor motor by D&M	110 VDC, 1450 rpm, 75 kW
Battery by Saft Nife	110 V, 199 AH, NiCd (SAF-39 SBL199)

== Performance ==
The WAP-5 (5440 HP) has the following capacity for ICF coaches in tonnes:

Gradient	Start	40 km/h	50 km/h	60 km/h	70 km/h	80 km/h	90 km/h	100 km/h	110 km/h	120 km/h	130 km/h	140 km/h	150 km/h	160 km/h
Level	1500+	1500+	1500+	1500+	1500+	1500+	1500+	1500+	1500+	1500+	1500+	1500+	1470	1230
1 in 500	1500+	1500+	1500+	1500+	1500+	1500+	1500+	1500+	1500+	1500+	1470	1250	1065	910
1 in 200	1500+	1500+	1500+	1500+	1500+	1500+	1500+	1500+	1350	1160	995	860	745	645
1 in 150	1500+	1500+	1500+	1500+	1500+	1500+	1500+	1310	1125	970	840	730	635	550
1 in 100	1500+	1500+	1500+	1500+	1460	1325	1125	970	840	730	635	555	480	420
1 in 50	1010	955	940	865	780	710	610	525	455	400	345	305	265	230

The average weight of an ICF coach is 55 tonnes.

== See also ==
- Locomotives of India
- Rail transport in India
