= Botad Junction railway station =

Railway Station in Gujarat, India

General information
- Location: Botad, Gujarat; India
- Coordinates: 22°10′59″N 71°39′57″E
- Elevation: 97 m (318.2 ft)
- System: Indian Railways station
- Owner: Ministry of Railways, Indian Railways
- Operator: Western Railway
- Line: Surendranagar–Bhavnagar line / Botad–Gandhigram line
- Platforms: 7
- Tracks: 7

Construction
- Structure type: Standard (on ground)
- Parking: Yes
- Cycle facilities: Yes

Other information
- Status: Functioning
- Station code: BTD
- Zone(s): Western Railway
- Division(s): Bhavnagar
Location
- Location within India Location within Gujarat

Botad Junction railway station is a railway station serving Botad town, in Botad district of Gujarat State of India. It is under Bhavnagar railway division of Western Railway zone of Indian Railways.

It is located at 97 m (318 ft) above sea level and has five platforms. As of 2016, a single diesel broad gauge railway line exists and at this station, 34 trains halt, two trains originate and two trains terminate. Bhavnagar Airport, is at distance of 75 kilometres (47 mi).

== Trains ==
The following trains halt at Botad Junction in both directions:

- 12945/46 Surat–Mahuva Superfast Express
- 12941/42 Parasnath Express
- 19259/60 Kochuveli–Bhavnagar Express
- 17203/04 Bhavnagar Terminus–Kakinada Port Express
- 12971/72 Bandra Terminus–Bhavnagar Terminus Express
- 19107/08 Bhavnagar Terminus–Udhampur Janmabhoomi Express
- 19272/71 Bhavnagar Terminus-Haridwar Weekly Express
- 12945/46 Veraval–Banaras Superfast Express
- 19203/04 Bandra Terminus–Veraval Weekly Superfast Express
