= Bhavnagar Terminus–MCTM Udhampur Janmabhoomi Express =

Train in India

Overview
- Service type: Express
- First service: 20 February 2011; 15 years ago
- Current operator: Western Railway

Route
- Termini: Bhavnagar Terminus (BVC); MCTM Udhampur (MCTM)
- Stops: 25
- Distance travelled: 1,843 km (1,145 mi)
- Average journey time: 35 hours 20 mins
- Service frequency: Weekly (Note: Runs one day in a week for every direction.)
- Train number: 19107 / 19108

On-board services
- Classes: AC 2 tier, AC 3 tier, Sleeper class, General Unreserved
- Seating arrangements: Yes
- Sleeping arrangements: Yes
- Catering facilities: On-board catering, E-catering
- Observation facilities: Large windows
- Baggage facilities: Available
- Other facilities: Below the seats

Technical
- Rolling stock: LHB coach
- Track gauge: 1,676 mm (5 ft 6 in)
- Operating speed: 53 km/h (33 mph) average including halts

The 19107 / 19108 Bhavnagar Terminus–MCTM Udhampur Janmabhoomi Express is an Express train belonging to Western Railway zone that runs between Bhavnagar Terminus of Gujarat and Udhampur of Jammu and Kashmir in India.

It is currently being operated with 19107/19108 train numbers on a weekly basis.

This train previously ran between Ahmedabad Junction and Udhampur, but since 10th March 2019 has been extended up to Bhavnagar Terminus by the Ministry of Railways.

== See also ==
- Udhampur railway station
- Ahmedabad Junction railway station
- Bhavnagar Terminus railway station
- Janmabhoomi Express
- Gandhinagar Capital–Bhavnagar Terminus Intercity Express
