= Surendranagar–Bhavnagar line =

Railway line in Gujarat, India

Overview
- Status: Operational
- Owner: Indian Railways
- Locale: Gujarat
- Termini: Surendranagar; Bhavnagar Terminus

Service
- Operator(s): Western Railway

History
- Opened: 1880

Technical
- Track length: 170 km (106 mi)
- Number of tracks: 1
- Track gauge: 5 ft 6 in (1,676 mm) broad gauge
- Electrification: 25 kV AC
- Operating speed: 100 km/h
- Highest elevation: 72m

The Surendranagar–Bhavnagar line is located in the Gujarat state of India. Some passenger trains run on this railway line.

== History ==
The Surendranagar–Bhavnagar line was laid by Bhavnagar State Railway in 1879 and was opened by 18 December 1880. Gauge conversion of this section was announced in Rail budget 1997. The gauge conversion foundation stone was laid by then Union Home Minister Lal Krishna Advani on 8 July 1999. Gauge conversion was sanctioned under SPV section from Surendranagar–Dhola–Pipavav in September 2000 by Indian Railway to serve Pipavav Port. The gauge conversion of this section was completed by 2003.
