= Mahuva Junction railway station =

Railway station in Gujarat, India

Mahuva junction railway station

General information
- Location: Mahuva, Bhavnagar, Gujarat; India
- Coordinates: 21°05′39″N 71°45′25″E
- Elevation: 20 metres (66 ft)
- System: Indian Railways station
- Owner: Indian Railways
- Operator: Western Railway
- Lines: Mahuva–Dhola line Mahuva–Velavadar line (MG)
- Platforms: 2
- Tracks: 4

Construction
- Structure type: Standard (on-ground station)
- Parking: No
- Cycle facilities: No

Other information
- Status: Active
- Station code: MHV
- Zone(s): Western Railway
- Division(s): Bhavnagar
Location
- Location within Gujarat

Mahuva Junction railway station is a main railway station in Bhavnagar district, Gujarat. Its code is MHV. It will serve Mahuva city. The station has two platforms. It is nearest railhead to Pipavav Port.

== Major trains ==
The train which originates from Mahuva Junction are :

● Surat–Mahuva Superfast Express (19255/19256)
