= Rajkot–Porbandar Fast Passenger =

Train in India

Rajkot - Porbandar Fast Passenger
Overview
- Service type: Passenger
- Current operator: Western Railway

Route
- Termini: Rajkot Junction (RJT); Porbandar (PBR)
- Stops: 19
- Distance travelled: 216 km (134 mi)
- Average journey time: 5h 50m
- Service frequency: Daily (Note: Runs seven days in a week for every direction.)
- Train number: 59211/59212

On-board services
- Class: Unreserved
- Seating arrangements: Yes
- Sleeping arrangements: No
- Catering facilities: No
- Entertainment facilities: No
- Baggage facilities: No

Technical
- Rolling stock: 2
- Track gauge: 5 ft 6 in (1,676 mm)
- Operating speed: 37 km/h (23 mph) average with halts

The Rajkot - Porbandar Fast Passenger is a passenger train belonging to Western Railway zone that runs between Porbandar and Rajkot Junction. It is currently being operated with 59211/59212 train numbers on a daily basis.

== Average speed and frequency ==
The 59211/Rajkot Porbandar Fast Passenger runs with an average speed of 37 km/h and completes 216 km in 5h 50m. The 59212/Porbandar Rajkot Fast Passenger runs with an average speed of 37 km/h and completes 216 km in 5h 50m.

== Route and halts ==
The important halts of the train are:

- Rajkot Junction
- Hadmatiya
- Hapa
- Jamnagar
- Pipli
- Kanalus Junction
- Bhanvad
- Jashapar
- Wansjaliya
- Ranavav
- Porbandar

== Coach composite ==
The train has standard ICF rakes with max speed of 110 kmph. The train consists of 8 coaches:

- 6 General Unreserved
- 2 Seating cum Luggage Rake

== Traction ==
Both trains are hauled by a Ratlam Loco Shed based WDM 3A diesel locomotive from Muzaffarpur to Porbandar and vice versa.

== Direction Reversal ==
Train Reverses its direction 1 times:

- Kanalus Junction

== See also ==
- Porbandar railway station
- Rajkot Junction railway station
- Rajkot - Porbandar Express
