= Wansjaliya Junction railway station =

Railway station in Gujarat, India

General information
- Location: Wansjaliya, Gujarat; India
- Coordinates: 21°47′58″N 69°52′25″E
- System: Indian Railways station
- Owner: Ministry of Railways, Indian Railways
- Operator: Western Railway
- Lines: Jamnagar–Porbandar line Porbandar–Jetalsar section
- Platforms: 3
- Tracks: 3

Construction
- Parking: No
- Cycle facilities: No

Other information
- Status: Functioning
- Station code: WSJ
- Zone(s): Western Railway
- Division(s): Bhavnagar
Location
- Location within India Location within Gujarat

Wansjaliya Junction railway station is a railway station serving in Jamnagar district of Gujarat state of India. It is under Bhavnagar railway division of Western Railway zone of Indian Railways. Wansjaliya Junction railway station is 34 km far away from Porbandar. Passenger, Express trains halt here.

== Major trains ==
Following major trains halt at Wansjaliya Junction railway station in both direction:

- 19015/16 Porbandar–Mumbai Central Saurashtra Express
- 19571/52 Rajkot–Porbandar Express (via Jetalsar)
- 19201/02 Secunderabad–Porbandar Weekly Express
- 19261/62 Kochuveli–Porbandar Express
- 12949/50 Porbandar–Santragachi Kavi Guru Superfast Express
- 19263/64 Porbandar–Delhi Sarai Rohilla Express
