= Lalpur Jam railway station =

Railway station in Gujarat, India

General information
- Location: Lalpur, Jamnagar district, Gujarat; India
- Coordinates: 22°11′30″N 69°57′14″E
- Elevation: 76 m (249.3 ft)
- System: Indian Railways station
- Owner: Ministry of Railways, Indian Railways
- Operator: Western Railway
- Line: Jamnagar–Porbandar line
- Platforms: 1
- Tracks: 1

Construction
- Parking: No
- Cycle facilities: No

Other information
- Status: Functioning
- Station code: LPJ
- Zone(s): Western Railway
- Division(s): Bhavnagar
Location
- Location within India Location within Gujarat

Lalpur Jam railway station is a railway station serving in Jamnagar district of Gujarat state of India. It is under Bhavnagar railway division of Western Railway zone of Indian Railways. Lalpur Jam railway station is 17 km far away from Kanalus Junction. Passenger, Express, and Superfast trains halt here.

== Trains ==
The following trains halt at Lalpur Jam railway station in both directions:

- 19015/16 Porbandar–Mumbai Central Saurashtra Express
- 12905/06 Howrah–Porbandar Express
- 19263/64 Porbandar–Delhi Sarai Rohilla Express
