= Bhanvad railway station =

Railway station in Gujarat, India

General information
- Location: Bhanvad, Gujarat; India
- Coordinates: 21°55′59″N 69°47′55″E
- Elevation: 62 m (203.4 ft)
- System: Indian Railways station
- Owner: Ministry of Railways, Indian Railways
- Operator: Western Railway
- Line: Jamnagar–Porbandar line
- Platforms: 2
- Tracks: 2

Construction
- Parking: No
- Cycle facilities: No

Other information
- Status: Functioning
- Station code: BNVD
- Zone(s): Western Railway
- Division(s): Bhavnagar
Location
- Location within India Location within Gujarat

Bhanvad railway station is a railway station serving in Devbhumi Dwarka district of Gujarat state of India. It is under Bhavnagar railway division of Western Railway zone of Indian Railways. Bhanvad railway station is 51 km far away from Porbandar. Passenger, Express and Superfast trains halt here.

== Major trains ==
Following major trains halt at Bhanvad railway station in both direction:

- 19015/16 Porbandar–Mumbai Central Saurashtra Express
- 12905 Howrah–Porbandar Express
- 19263/64 Porbandar–Delhi Sarai Rohilla Express
- 19269/70 Porbandar–Muzaffarpur Express
