= Ranavav railway station =

Railway station in Gujarat, India

General information
- Location: Ranavav, Gujarat; India
- Coordinates: 21°41′55″N 69°43′35″E
- System: Indian Railway Station
- Owner: Ministry of Railways, Indian Railways
- Operator: Western Railway
- Lines: Jamnagar–Porbandar line Porbandar–Jetalsar section
- Platforms: 1
- Tracks: 1

Construction
- Parking: No
- Cycle facilities: No

Other information
- Status: Functioning
- Station code: RWO
- Zone(s): Western Railway
- Division(s): Bhavnagar
Location
- Location within Gujarat

Ranavav railway station is a railway station serving in Porbandar district of Gujarat State of India. It is under Bhavnagar railway division of Western Railway Zone of Indian Railways. Ranavav railway station is 13 km far away from Porbandar. Passenger, Express trains halt here.

== Major trains ==
Following major trains halt at Ranavav railway station in both direction:

- 19015/16 Porbandar - Mumbai Central Saurashtra Express
- 19571/72 Rajkot - Porbandar Express (Via Jetalsar)
