= Gop Jam railway station =

Railway station in Gujarat, India

General information
- Location: Gop Jam, Jamnagar district, Gujarat; India
- Coordinates: 22°03′08″N 69°54′26″E
- Elevation: 126 m (413.4 ft)
- System: Indian Railway Station
- Owner: Ministry of Railways, Indian Railways
- Operator: Western Railway
- Line: Jamnagar–Porbandar line
- Platforms: 1
- Tracks: 1

Construction
- Parking: No
- Cycle facilities: No

Other information
- Status: Functioning
- Station code: GOP
- Zone(s): Western Railway
- Division(s): Bhavnagar
Location
- Location within India Location within Gujarat

Gop Jam railway station is a railway station serving in Jamnagar district of Gujarat State of India. It is under Bhavnagar railway division of Western Railway Zone of Indian Railways. Gop Jam railway station is 34 km away from Kanalus Junction. Passenger, Express trains halt here. To reach Gop mountain, Zinavari's old Sun temple and Gopnath mahadev temple etc. tourist attractions, this railway station is very near and useful.

== Trains ==
The following major halt at Gop Jam railway station in both directions:

- 19015/16 Porbandar - Mumbai Central Saurashtra Express
