= Katkola railway station =

Railway station in Gujarat, India

General information
- Location: Katkola, Jamnagar district India
- Coordinates: 21°51′11″N 69°53′07″E
- Elevation: 76 m (249 ft)
- System: Indian Railway Station
- Owner: Ministry of Railways, Indian Railways
- Operator: Western Railway
- Line: Porbandar–Jetalsar section
- Platforms: 2
- Tracks: 2

Construction
- Structure type: Standard (On Ground)
- Parking: No

Other information
- Status: Functioning
- Station code: KTLA
- Zone(s): Western Railway
- Division(s): Bhavnagar
Location
- Location within Gujarat

Katkola railway station is a railway station on the Western Railway network in the state of Gujarat, India. Katkola railway station is 40 km far away from Porbandar railway station. Passenger trains halt here.

== See also ==
- Jamnagar district
