= Porbandar–Muzaffarpur Express =

Train in India

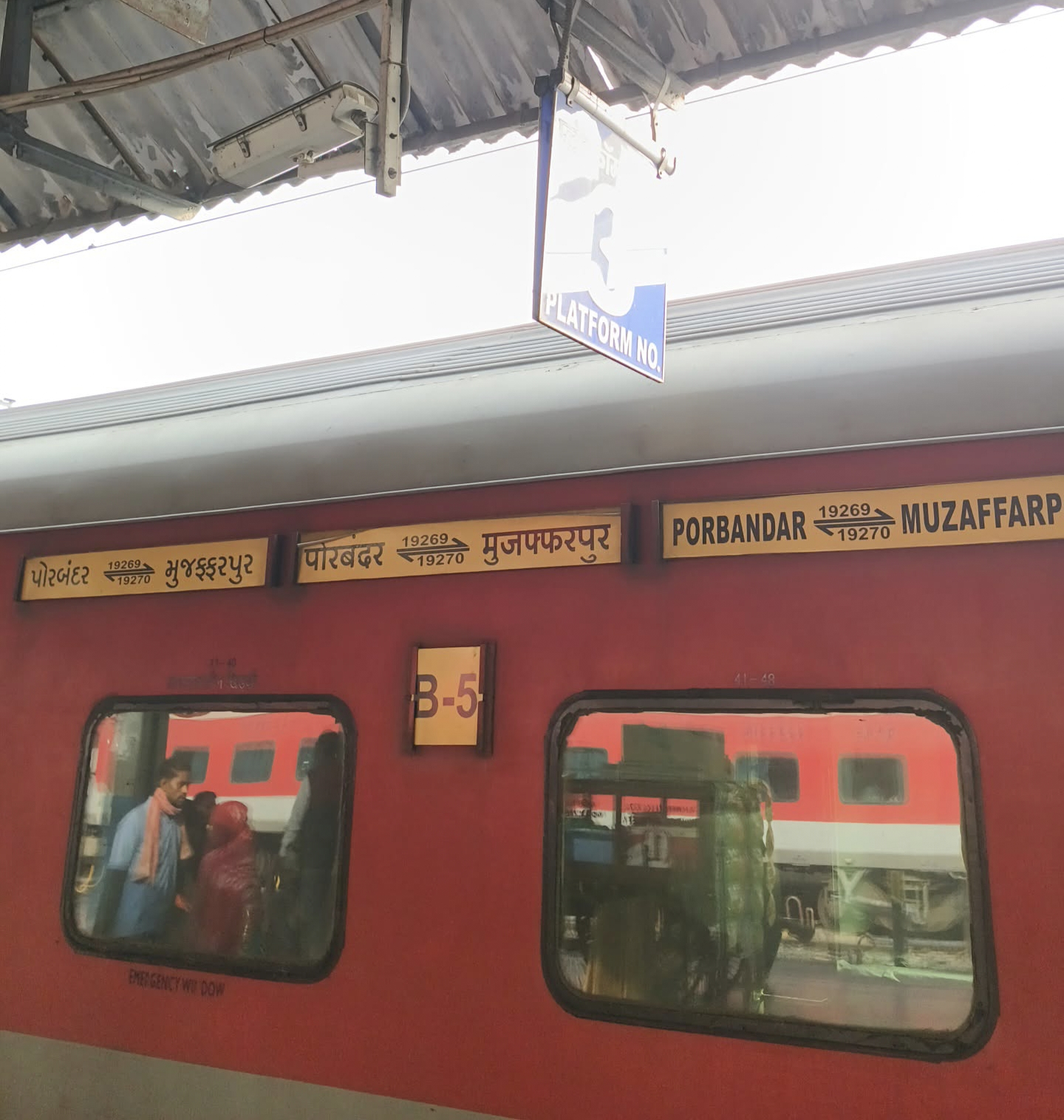
- MFP-PBR Express at Muzaffarpur Junction.

Overview
- Service type: Express
- First service: 4 October 2006; 19 years ago
- Current operator: Western Railway

Route
- Termini: Porbandar (PBR); Muzaffarpur (MFP)
- Stops: 16
- Distance travelled: 2,443 km (1,518 mi)
- Average journey time: 46 hrs 30 mins
- Service frequency: Bi-weekly
- Train number: 19269 / 19270

On-board services
- Classes: AC First Class, AC 2 Tier, AC 3 Tier, Sleeper Class, General Unreserved
- Seating arrangements: No
- Sleeping arrangements: Yes
- Catering facilities: Pantry Car, On-board catering, E-catering
- Observation facilities: Large windows
- Baggage facilities: No
- Other facilities: Below the seats

Technical
- Rolling stock: LHB coach
- Track gauge: 1,676 mm (5 ft 6 in)
- Operating speed: 52 km/h (32 mph) average including halts.

The 19269 / 19270 Porbandar–Muzaffarpur Express is an express train belonging to Western Railway zone that runs between Porbandar and Muzaffarpur Junction in India. It is currently being operated with 19269/19270 train numbers on a bi-weekly basis.

== Schedule ==
19269 / 19270 Train Schedule
Train Type	Mail/Express
Distance	2448 km
Average Speed	~51 km/h
Journey Time (PBR → MFP)	47 hrs 45 min
Journey Time (MFP → PBR)	46 hrs 20 min
Classes Available	1A, 2A, 3A, SL, GEN, PWD
Operating Days	PBR–MFP: Thursday, Friday; MFP–PBR: Monday, Sunday
Operator	Western Railway

== Route & halts ==
19269/19270 Porbandar–Muzaffarpur Express Schedule
Sr.	19270 MFP–PBR				19269 PBR–MFP			
Sr.	Station	Arr.	Dep.	Dist. (km)	Station	Arr.	Dep.	Dist. (km)
1	Muzaffarpur Junction	SRC	15:15	0	Porbandar	SRC	19:40	0
2	Mehsi	15:58	16:00	39	Bhanvad	20:27	20:28	52
3	Chakia	16:11	16:13	48	Jamnagar	21:57	22:02	139
4	Bapudm Motihari	16:38	16:40	79	Hapa	22:18	22:20	147
5	Sagauli Junction	17:08	17:10	101	Rajkot Junction	23:52	23:57	221
6	Bettiah	17:28	17:30	123	Wankaner Junction	00:38	00:40	262
7	Narkatiaganj Junction	18:20	18:25	159	Surendranagar	01:42	01:44	337
8	Bagaha	19:04	19:07	201	Viramgam Junction	03:15	03:17	401
9	Siswa Bazar	20:33	20:35	244	Chandlodiya B Cabin	04:05	04:10	455
10	Gorakhpur Junction	22:12	22:20	310	Mahesana Junction	05:02	05:04	517
11	Gonda Junction	01:40	01:50	464	Palanpur Junction	06:28	06:30	582
12	Lucknow Junction	04:15	04:25	580	Abu Road	07:10	07:20	635
13	Shahjahanpur	06:51	06:53	744	Marwar Junction	09:20	09:25	800
14	Bareilly Junction	07:50	07:55	815	Beawar	10:32	10:34	888
15	Moradabad	09:08	09:13	906	Ajmer Junction	11:45	11:55	940
16	Delhi Junction	12:50	13:05	1066	Jaipur Junction	14:00	14:10	1074
17	Delhi Sarai Rohilla	13:19	13:21	1071	Bandikui Junction	15:32	15:34	1164
18	Delhi Cantonment	13:38	13:40	1081	Alwar Junction	16:21	16:24	1225
19	Gurgaon	13:56	13:58	1098	Rewari Junction	17:53	17:55	1299
20	Rewari Junction	14:43	14:45	1149	Gurgaon	18:35	18:37	1350
21	Alwar Junction	15:47	15:50	1223	Delhi Cantonment	18:53	18:55	1367
22	Bandikui Junction	16:34	16:36	1283	Delhi Sarai Rohilla	19:15	19:17	1377
23	Jaipur Junction	18:15	18:25	1374	Delhi Junction	20:20	20:35	1381
24	Ajmer Junction	20:50	21:00	1508	Moradabad	23:35	23:40	1542
25	Beawar	21:42	21:44	1560	Bareilly Junction	01:00	01:02	1632
26	Marwar Junction	23:00	23:05	1647	Shahjahanpur	02:11	02:13	1703
27	Abu Road	01:10	01:20	1812	Lucknow Junction	05:15	05:25	1868
28	Palanpur Junction	02:20	02:22	1865	Gonda Junction	08:05	08:10	1984
29	Mahesana Junction	03:10	03:12	1930	Gorakhpur Junction	10:45	10:55	2138
30	Chandlodiya B Cabin	04:33	04:38	1992	Siswa Bazar	12:36	12:38	2204
31	Viramgam Junction	05:28	05:30	2046	Bagaha	14:11	14:14	2247
32	Surendranagar	07:01	07:03	2111	Narkatiaganj Junction	15:05	15:10	2289
33	Wankaner Junction	07:57	07:59	2185	Bettiah	15:42	15:45	2325
34	Rajkot Junction	08:55	09:05	2227	Sagauli Junction	16:06	16:08	2347
35	Hapa	10:13	10:15	2300	Bapudm Motihari	16:24	16:27	2369
36	Jamnagar	10:27	10:32	2309	Chakia	16:55	16:57	2400
37	Bhanvad	12:10	12:11	2395	Mehsi	17:06	17:08	2408
38	Porbandar	13:35	DSTN	2448	Muzaffarpur Junction	19:25	DSTN	2448

== Coach composition ==
19269 / 19270 Coach Composition
Category	Coaches	Total	Description
AC First Class (1A)	H1	1	Air-conditioned First Class coach
AC 2 Tier (2A)	A1, A2	2	AC 2-Tier sleeper coaches
AC 3 Tier (3A)	B1, B2, B3, B4, B5, B6	6	AC 3-Tier sleeper coaches
Sleeper Class (SL)	S1, S2, S3, S4, S5, S6	6	Non-AC sleeper coaches
Pantry Car (PC)	PC	1	Pantry car for onboard catering
General Unreserved (GEN)	GEN1, GEN2, GEN3, GEN4	4	General class coaches (unreserved)
SLR (Seating–Luggage Rake)	SLR	1	Guards and luggage coach
EOG (End-On Generator)	EOG	1	Power car for LHB rake

- Primary Maintenance - Porbandar Coaching Depot
- Secondaryary Maintenance - Muzaffarpur Coaching Depot

== Rake sharing ==
The train shares its rake with 20937/20938 Porbandar–Delhi Sarai Rohilla Superfast Express.

== Traction ==
Both trains are hauled by a Vadodara Loco Shed based WAP-5 or Vatva Loco Shed based WAP-4 electric locomotive from Muzaffarpur to Porbandar and vice versa.

== See also ==
- Secunderabad–Porbandar Weekly Express
- Porbandar–Delhi Sarai Rohilla Superfast Express
- Shalimar–Porbandar Superfast Express
