= Secunderabad–Porbandar Weekly Express =

Train in India

- Secunderabad-Porbandar Express train board.

Overview
- Service type: Express
- First service: 11 July 2012; 13 years ago
- Current operator: Western Railway

Route
- Termini: Secunderabad (SC); Porbandar (PBR)
- Stops: 16
- Distance travelled: 1,682 km (1,045 mi)
- Average journey time: 31 hrs 15 mins
- Service frequency: Weekly (Note: Runs one day in a week for every direction.)
- Train number: 20967 / 20968

On-board services
- Classes: AC 2 tier, AC 3 tier, Sleeper class, General Unreserved
- Seating arrangements: No
- Sleeping arrangements: Yes
- Catering facilities: On-board catering, E-catering
- Observation facilities: Large windows
- Baggage facilities: No
- Other facilities: Below the seats

Technical
- Rolling stock: ICF coach
- Track gauge: 1,676 mm (5 ft 6 in)
- Operating speed: 55 km/h (34 mph) average including halts.

The 20967 / 20968 Secunderabad–Porbandar Weekly Express is an Express train belonging to Western Railway zone that runs between Secunderabad Junction and Porbandar in India. It is currently being operated with 20967/20968 train numbers on a weekly basis.

== Coach composition ==
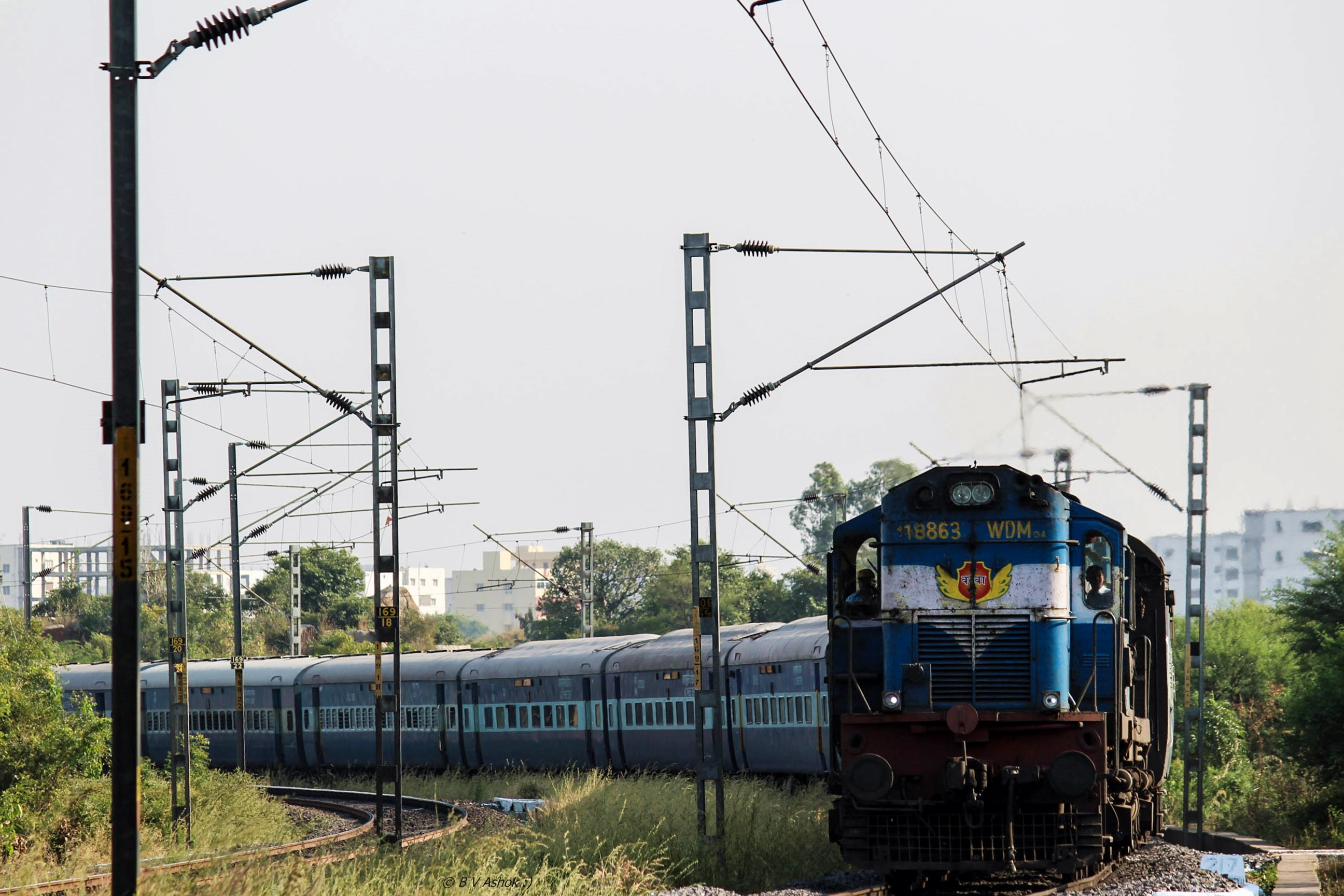
Secunderabad–Porbandar Express near Hi-Tech City railway station in Hyderabad

The train has standard ICF rakes with a maximum speed of 110 km/h. The train consists of 24 coaches:

- 1 AC First
- 2 AC II Tier
- 6 AC III Tier
- 9 Sleeper coaches
- 1 Pantry car
- 3 General Unreserved
- 2 Seating cum Luggage Rake

== Service ==
- The 20967/Secunderabad–Porbandar Weekly Express has an average speed of 55 km/h and covers 1682 km in 30 hrs 40 mins.
- The 20968/Porbandar–Secunderabad Weekly Express has an average speed of 54 km/h and covers 1682 km in 31 hrs.

== Route & halts ==
The important halts of the train are:

- Secunderabad Junction
- Wadi Junction
- Kalaburagi Junction
- Solapur
- Daund Junction
- Pune Junction
- Karjat
- Kalyan Junction
- Bhiwandi Road
- Vasai Road
- Vapi
- Valsad
- Surat
- Ankleshwar Junction
- Vadodara Junction
- Ahmedabad Junction
- Viramgam Junction
- Surendranagar Junction
- Rajkot Junction
- Hapa
- Jamnagar
- Wansjaliya
- Porbandar

== Traction ==
Both trains are hauled by a Vatva Loco Shed-based WAP4E Electric locomotive from Porbandar to Secunderabad and vice versa.

== Rake sharing ==
The train shares its rake with;

- 12905/12906 Shalimar–Porbandar Superfast Express
- 20937/20938 Porbandar–Delhi Sarai Rohilla Superfast Express
- 19269/19270 Porbandar–Muzaffarpur Express.

== See also ==
- Howrah–Porbandar Express
- Porbandar railway station
- Porbandar–Delhi Sarai Rohilla Superfast Express
- Porbandar–Muzaffarpur Express
