= Upleta railway station =

Railway station in Gujarat, India

General information
- Location: Upleta, Gujarat; India
- Coordinates: 21°44′48″N 70°17′00″E
- System: Indian Railway Station
- Owner: Ministry of Railways, Indian Railways
- Operator: Western Railway
- Line: Porbandar–Jetalsar section
- Platforms: 2
- Tracks: 2

Construction
- Parking: No
- Cycle facilities: No

Other information
- Status: Functioning
- Station code: UA
- Zone(s): Western Railway
- Division(s): Bhavnagar
Location
- Location within India Location within Gujarat

Upleta railway station is a railway station serving in Rajkot district of Gujarat State of India. It is under Bhavnagar railway division of Western Railway Zone of Indian Railways. Upleta railway station is 110 km away from Rajkot Junction. Passenger and Express trains halt here.

== Trains ==
The following trains halt at Upleta railway station in both directions:

- 19571/52 Rajkot - Porbandar Express (Via Jetalsar)
- 12949/50 Porbandar - Santragachi Kavi Guru Superfast Express
