= LPJ =

LPJ may refer to:

- London Progressive Journal, a UK-based weekly online magazine
- LPJ, the station code for Lalpur Jam railway station, Gujarat, India
- Lijo Jose Pellissery, Indian film director
