= Dhoraji railway station =

Railway station in Gujarat, India

General information
- Location: Dhoraji, Gujarat; India
- Coordinates: 21°43′18″N 70°26′39″E
- System: Indian Railway Station
- Owner: Ministry of Railways, Indian Railways
- Operator: Western Railway
- Line: Porbandar–Jetalsar section
- Platforms: 1
- Tracks: 1

Construction
- Parking: No
- Cycle facilities: No

Other information
- Status: Functioning
- Station code: DJI
- Zone(s): Western Railway
- Division(s): Bhavnagar
Location
- Location within Gujarat

Dhoraji railway station is a railway station serving in Rajkot district of Gujarat State of India. It is under Bhavnagar railway division of Western Railway Zone of Indian Railways. Dhoraji railway station is 91 km far away from Rajkot Junction. Passenger, Express trains halt here.

== Major trains ==
Following major trains halt at Dhoraji railway station in both direction:

- 19571/52 Rajkot - Porbandar Express (Via Jetalsar)
