= BHY =

BHY or bhy may refer to:

- Beihai Fucheng Airport, the IATA code BHY
- RAF Honiley, the former IATA code BHY
- Birgenair, the ICAO code BHY
- Bhele language, the ISO 639-3 code bhy
- Bhayavadar railway station, the station code BHY
- Henry Boot plc, the LSE code BHY
