= Tirunelveli–Jamnagar Express =

Train in India

Overview
- Service type: Express
- Locale: Gujarat, Maharashtra, Goa, Karnataka, Kerala & Tamil Nadu
- First service: 30 March 2010; 16 years ago (Inaugural); 31 March 2017; 9 years ago (extended upto Jamnagar)
- Current operator: Western Railway

Route
- Termini: Tirunelveli (TEN); Jamnagar (JAM)
- Stops: 29
- Distance travelled: 2,434 km (1,512 mi)
- Average journey time: 44 hrs 45 mins
- Service frequency: Bi-weekly
- Train number: 19577 / 19578

On-board services
- Classes: AC 2 tier, AC 3 tier, Sleeper Class, General Unreserved
- Seating arrangements: Yes
- Sleeping arrangements: Yes
- Catering facilities: On-board catering, E-catering
- Observation facilities: Large windows
- Baggage facilities: Available
- Other facilities: Below the seats

Technical
- Rolling stock: LHB coach
- Track gauge: 1,676 mm (5 ft 6 in)
- Operating speed: 130 km/h (81 mph) maximum, 56 km/h (35 mph) average including halts.
- Rake sharing: Rake sharing with 22907/22908 Madgaon-Hapa Superfast Express
Route map
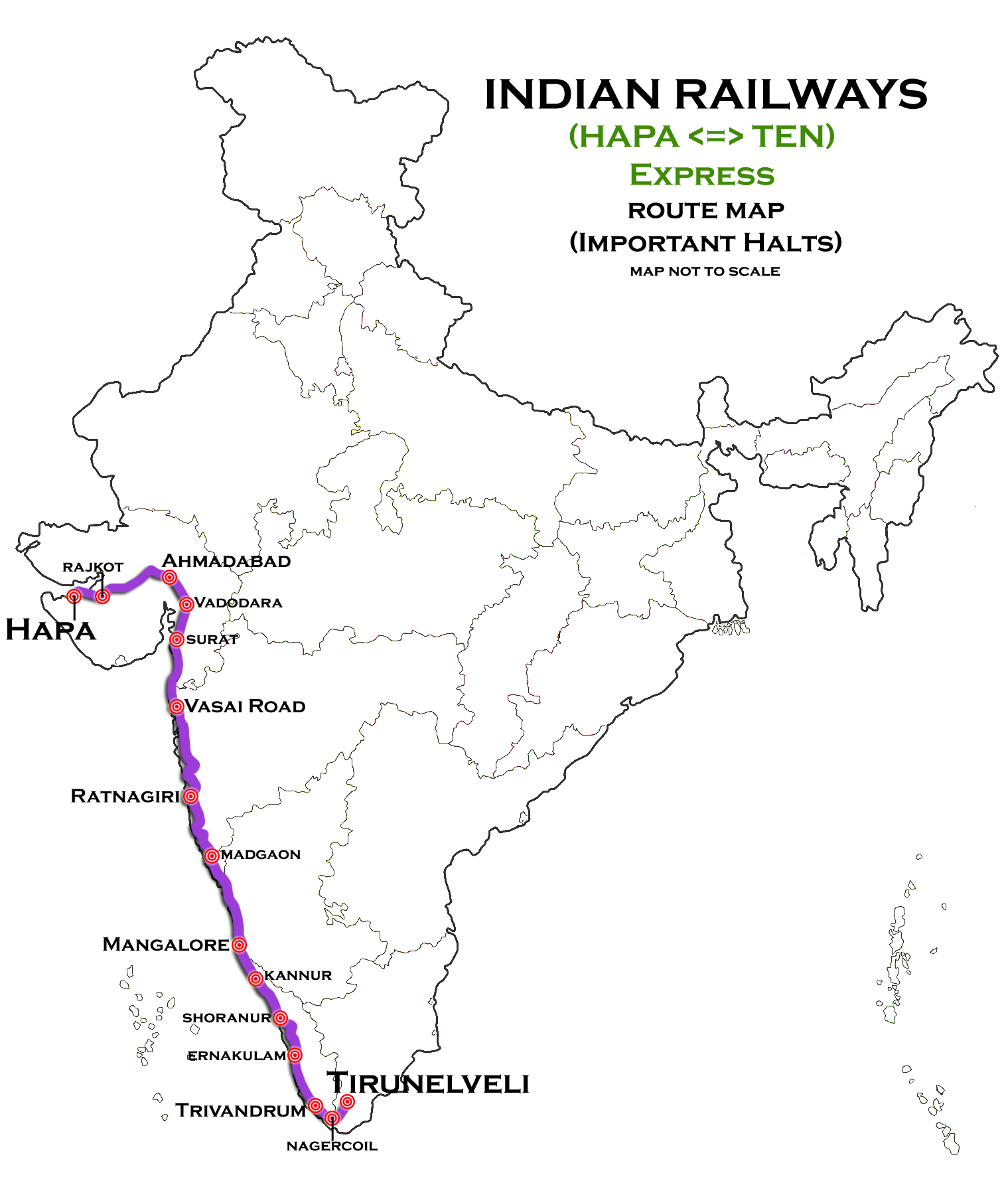

The 19577 / 19578 Tirunelveli–Jamnagar Express is an express train operated by Indian Railways that runs between Tirunelveli Junction and Jamnagar in India. It is currently being operated with 19577/19578 train numbers on bi-weekly basis.

It operates as train number 19577 from Tirunelveli Junction to Jamnagar and as train number 19578 from Jamnagar to Tirunelveli Junction.

== Coach composition ==
The train has standard LHB rakes with max speed of 130 kmph. The train consists of 24 coaches :

- 2 AC II Tier
- 4 AC III Tier
- 2 AC III Tier Economy
- 9 Sleeper Class
- 1 Pantry Car
- 4 General
- 1 Generator Car
- 1 Seating cum Luggage Rake

== Service ==
The 19577/Tirunelveli–Jamnagar Express has an average speed of 55 km/h and covers 2434 km in 44 hrs 25 mins.

The 19578/Jamnagar–Tirunelveli Express has an average speed of 54 km/h and covers 2434 km in 45 hrs 00 mins.

== Route & halts ==
The 19577/19578 Tirunelveli–Jamnagar Express runs from Tirunelveli Junction via Valliyoor Nagercoil Town,Parassala, Thiruvananthapuram Central, Kollam Junction, Alappuzha, Ernakulam Junction, Shoranur Junction, Mangaluru Junction, Madgaon Junction, Ratnagiri, Panvel, Vasai Road, Vadodara Junction, Ahmedabad Junction, Surendranagar Junction, Rajkot Junction to Jamnagar.

== Schedule ==
Train number	Station code	Departure station	Departure time	Departure day	Arrival station	Arrival time	Arrival day
19577	TEN	Tirunelveli	08:00 AM	Mon, Tue	Jamnagar	04:25 AM	Wed, Thu
19578	JAM	Jamnagar	21:20 PM	Fri, Sat	Tirunelveli	18:20 PM	Sun, Mon

== Traction ==
It is now hauled by a Vadodara Loco Shed based WAP-5 / WAP-7 electric locomotive on its entire journey.

== Rake sharing ==
The train shares its rake with 22907 / 22908 Madgaon-Hapa Superfast Express.
