= Rajkot–Porbandar Express =

Indian express trail

Overview
- Service type: Express
- First service: 11 February 2011; 15 years ago
- Current operator: Western Railway zone

Route
- Termini: Rajkot Junction (RJT); Porbandar (PBR)
- Stops: 13
- Distance travelled: 202 km (126 mi)
- Average journey time: 4 hrs 15 mins
- Service frequency: Daily
- Train number: 19571/19572

On-board services
- Class: General Unreserved
- Seating arrangements: Yes
- Sleeping arrangements: No
- Catering facilities: No
- Observation facilities: ICF coach
- Entertainment facilities: No
- Baggage facilities: No
- Other facilities: Below the seats

Technical
- Rolling stock: 2
- Track gauge: 1,676 mm (5 ft 6 in)
- Operating speed: 44 km/h (27 mph), including halts

The 19571/19572 Rajkot–Porbandar Express is an Express train belonging to Western Railway zone that runs between Rajkot Junction and Porbandar in India. It is currently being operated with 19571/19572 train numbers on a daily basis.

== Coach composition ==
The train has standard ICF rakes with max speed of 110 kmph. The train consists of 10 coaches:

- 8 General Unreserved
- 2 Seating cum Luggage Rake

== Service ==
- 19571/Rajkot–Porbandar Express has an average speed of 45 km/h and covers 202 km in 4 hrs 30 mins.
- 19572/Porbandar–Rajkot Express has an average speed of 48 km/h and covers 202 km in 4 hrs 10 mins.

== Route and halts ==
The important halts of the train are:

- Rajkot Junction
- Bhaktinagar
- Gondal
- Virpur
- Navagadh
- Jetalsar Junction
- Dhoraji
- Upleta
- Bhayavadar
- Paneli Moti
- Jam Jodhpur Junction
- Balwa
- Wansjaliya
- Ranavav
- Porbandar

== Schedule ==
Train number	Station code	Departure station	Departure time	Departure day	Arrival station	Arrival time	Arrival day
19571	RJT	Rajkot	07:00 AM	Daily	Porbandar	11:30 AM	Daily
19572	PBR	Porbandar	14:30 PM	Daily	Rajkot	18:40 PM	Daily

== Traction ==
Both trains are hauled by a Vatva Loco Shed-based WAP-4 diesel locomotive from Rajkot to Porbandar and vice versa.

== See also ==
- Porbandar railway station
- Rajkot Junction railway station
- Rajkot–Porbandar Fast Passenger
