= Madgaon–Hapa Superfast Express =

Train in India

Overview
- Service type: Superfast
- Locale: Gujarat, Maharashtra & Goa
- First service: 20 July 2012; 13 years ago
- Current operator: Western Railway

Route
- Termini: Madgaon Junction (MAO); Hapa (HAPA)
- Stops: 16
- Distance travelled: 1,348 km (838 mi)
- Average journey time: 22 hrs 30 mins
- Service frequency: Weekly (Note: Runs one day in a week for every direction.)
- Train number: 22907 / 22908

On-board services
- Classes: AC 2 tier, AC 3 tier, Sleeper class, General Unreserved
- Seating arrangements: Yes
- Sleeping arrangements: Yes
- Catering facilities: On-board catering E-catering
- Observation facilities: Large windows
- Other facilities: Below the seats

Technical
- Rolling stock: LHB coach
- Track gauge: 1,676 mm (5 ft 6 in)
- Operating speed: 57 km/h (35 mph) average including halts

The 22907 / 22908 Madgaon–Hapa Superfast Express is a Superfast train belonging to Western Railway zone that runs between Madgaon Junction and Hapa in India. It is currently being operated with 22907/22908 train numbers on a weekly basis.

== Coach composition ==
The train has standard ICF rakes with a maximum speed of 110 km/h. The train consists of 23 coaches:

- 1 AC II Tier
- 5 AC III Tier
- 10 Sleeper
- 1 Pantry Car
- 4 General Unreserved
- 2 Seating cum Luggage Rake

== Service ==
- The 22907/Madgaon–Hapa Superfast Express has an average speed of 61 km/h and covers 1348 km in 22 hrs 15 mins.
- The 22908/Hapa–Madgaon Superfast Express has an average speed of 58 km/h and covers 1348 km in 23 hrs 20 mins.

== Schedule ==
Train number	Station code	Departure station	Departure time	Departure day	Arrival station	Arrival time	Arrival day
22907	MAO	Madgaon	11:20 AM	Friday	Hapa	09:35 AM	Saturday
22908	HAPA	Hapa	21:40 PM	Wednesday	Madgaon	21:00 PM	Thursday

== Route and halts ==
The important halts of the train are:

- Madgaon Junction
- Thivim
- Kudal
- Ratnagiri
- Khed
- Panvel
- Vasai Road
- Vapi
- Surat
- Bharuch Junction
- Vadodara Junction
- Anand Junction
- Nadiad Junction
- Ahmedabad Junction
- Viramgam Junction
- Surendranagar Junction
- Rajkot Junction
- Hapa

== Traction ==
Both trains are hauled by a Vatva Loco Shed based WAP-4 or Vadodara Loco Shed based WAP-5 electric locomotive from Madgoan to Hapa and vice versa

== Rake sharing ==
The train shares its rake with 19577/19578 Jamnagar Tirunelveli Express.

== See also ==
- Hapa railway station
- Madgaon Junction railway station
- Jamnagar Tirunelveli Express
