= Mumbai Central–Hapa Duronto Express =

Train in India

Mumbai Central – Hapa AC Duronto Express

Overview
- Service type: Duronto Express
- First service: 22 December 2009; 16 years ago
- Current operator: Western Railway

Route
- Termini: Mumbai Central (MMCT); Hapa (HAPA)
- Stops: 3
- Distance travelled: 815 km (506 mi)
- Average journey time: 11 hrs 40 mins as 12267 & 11 hrs 55 mins as 12268
- Service frequency: Daily Service
- Train number: 12267 / 12268

On-board services
- Classes: AC 1st Class, AC 2 tier, AC 3 tier,
- Seating arrangements: No
- Sleeping arrangements: Yes
- Catering facilities: No
- Observation facilities: Large windows

Technical
- Rolling stock: LHB coach
- Track gauge: 1,676 mm (5 ft 6 in)
- Operating speed: 130 km/h (81 mph) Top Operating Speed,69 km/h (43 mph) (average speed)

The 12267/12268 Mumbai Central–Hapa Duronto Express is a Superfast Express train belonging to Western Railway zone that runs between Mumbai Central and Hapa in India. It is currently being operated with 12267/12268 train numbers on daily basis.

The train had its inaugural run on 22 December 2009. It was initially running up to Ahmedabad Junction. The train was extended to Rajkot Junction. In 2022, The train was extended to Hapa.

== Coach composition ==
earlier the trains run with mixed ICF rakes of ICF Rajdhani , Utkrisht and Duronto in one train. Now The train has standard LHB rakes with max speed of 130 kmph. The train consists of 16 coaches :

- 1 AC First Class
- 3 AC II Tier
- 6 AC III Tier
- 4 AC III Tier Economy
- 1 End On Generator
- 1 2nd seating class Tier (DL1)

== Service ==
The 12267/Mumbai Central - Hapa Duronto Express has an average speed of 70 km/h and covers 815 km in 11 hrs 40 mins.

The 12268/Hapa - Mumbai Central Duronto Express has an average speed of 68 km/h and covers 815 km in 11 hrs 55 mins.

== Route and halts ==
The important halts of the train are:

- Mumbai Central
- Ahmedabad Junction
- Surendranagar Junction
- Rajkot Junction
- Hapa

== Schedule ==
Train number	Station code	Departure station	Departure time	Departure day	Arrival station	Arrival time	Arrival day
12267	MMCT	Mumbai Central	23:00 PM	Daily	Hapa	10:40 AM	Daily
12268	HAPA	Hapa	20:05 PM	Daily	Mumbai Central	08:00 AM	Daily

== Gallery ==
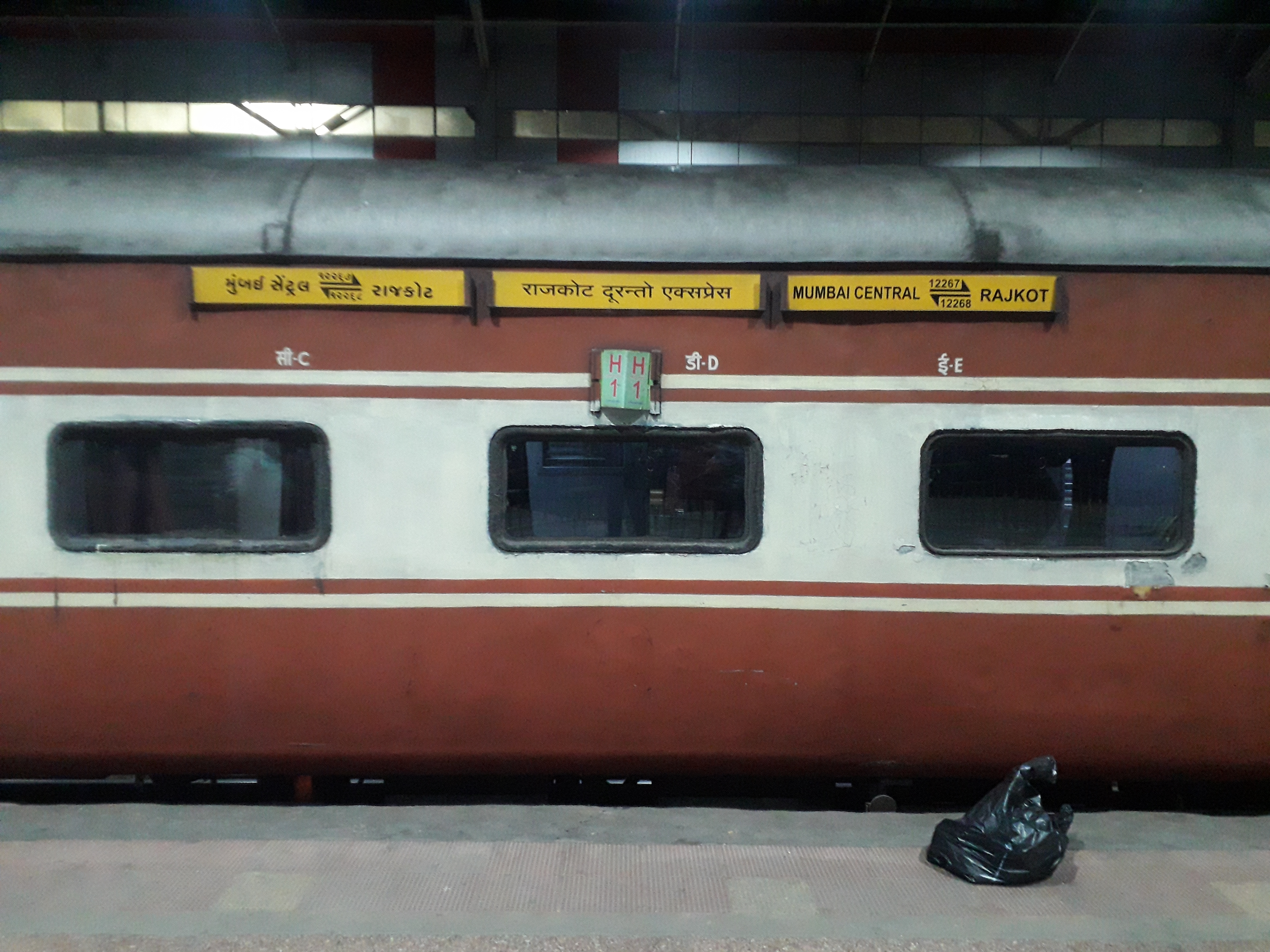
12268 Rajkot Duronto Express –Old AC 1st Class

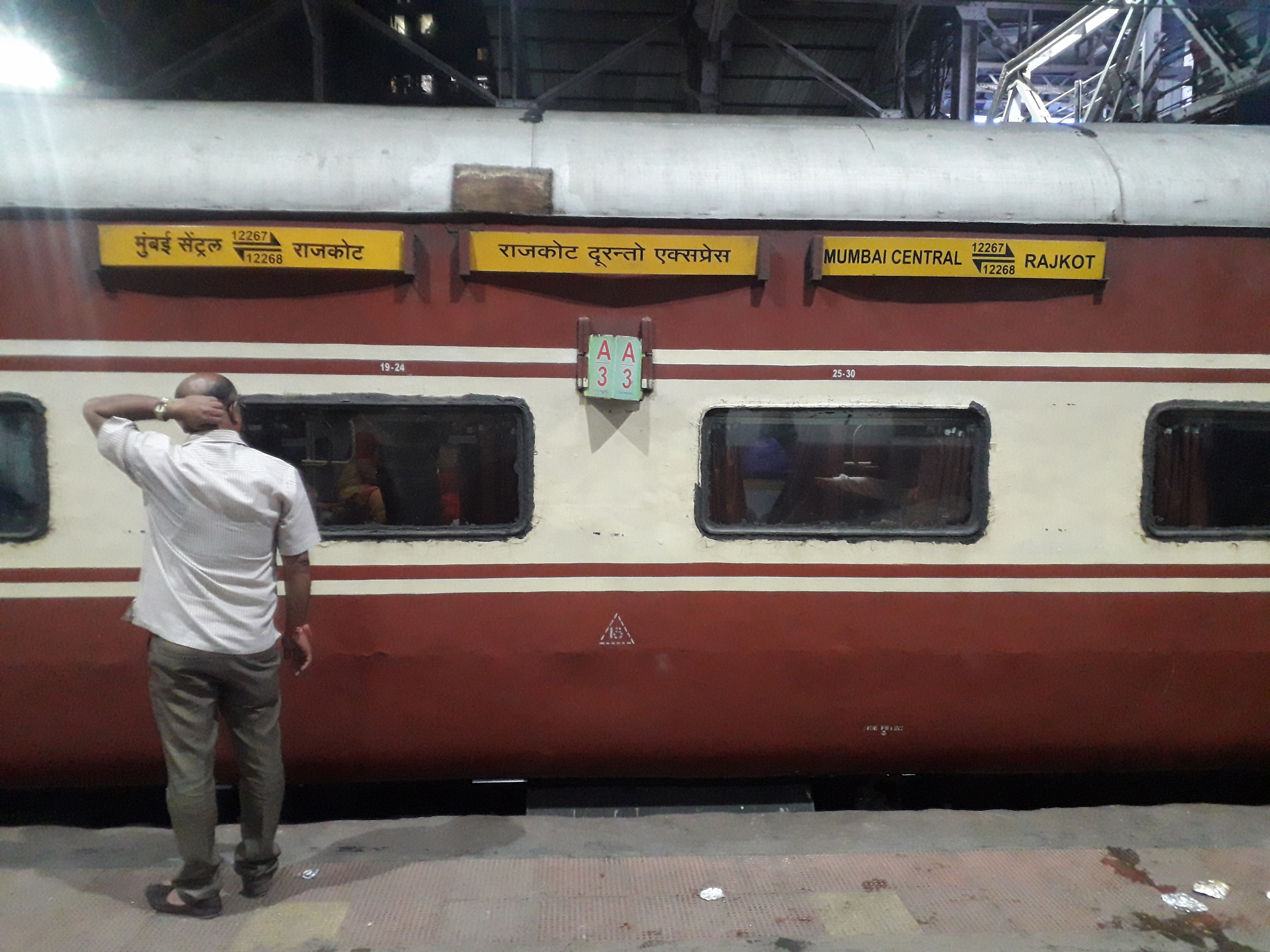
12268 Rajkot Duronto Express – Old AC 2 tier

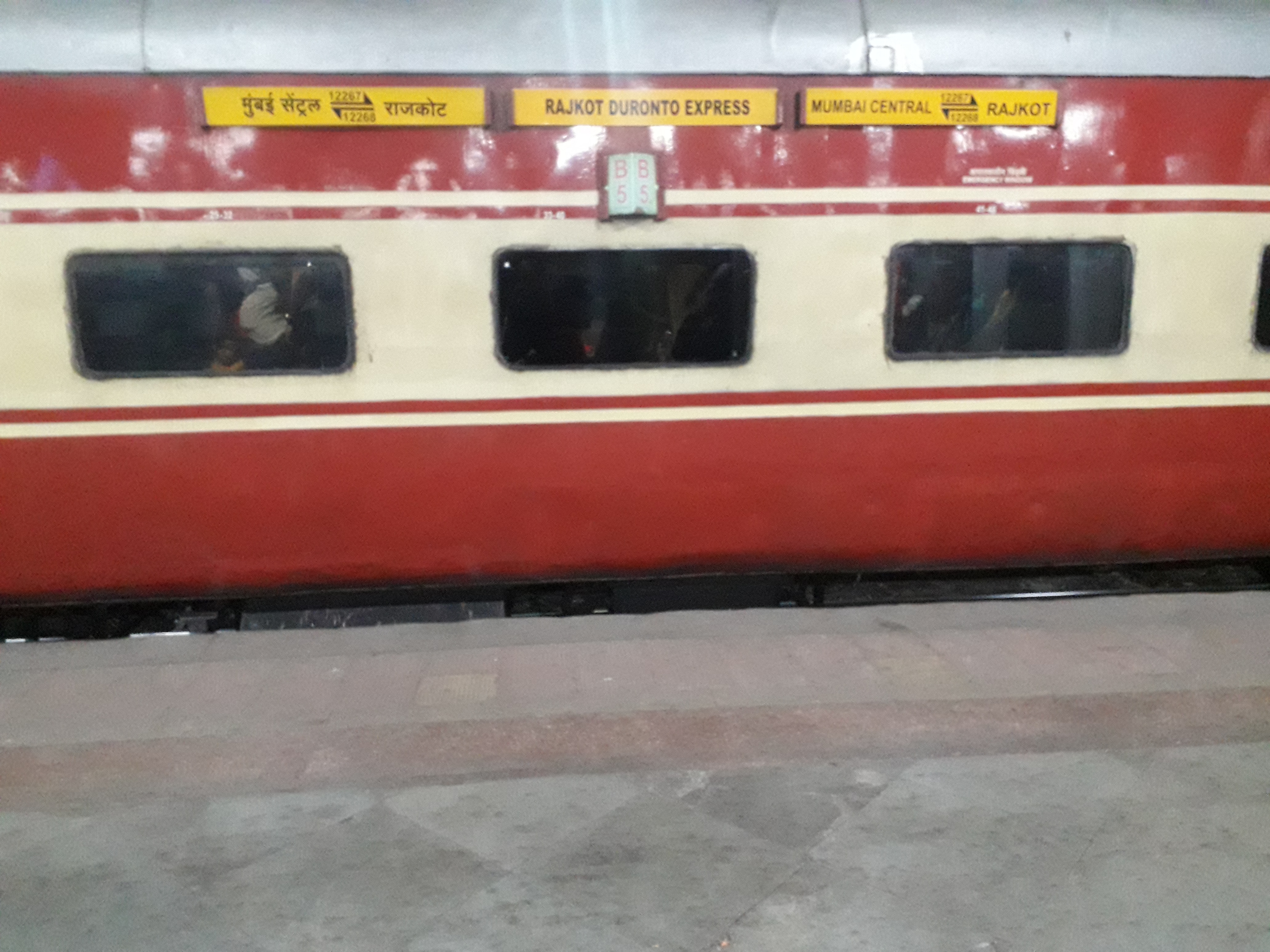
12268 Rajkot Duronto Express – Old AC 3 tier

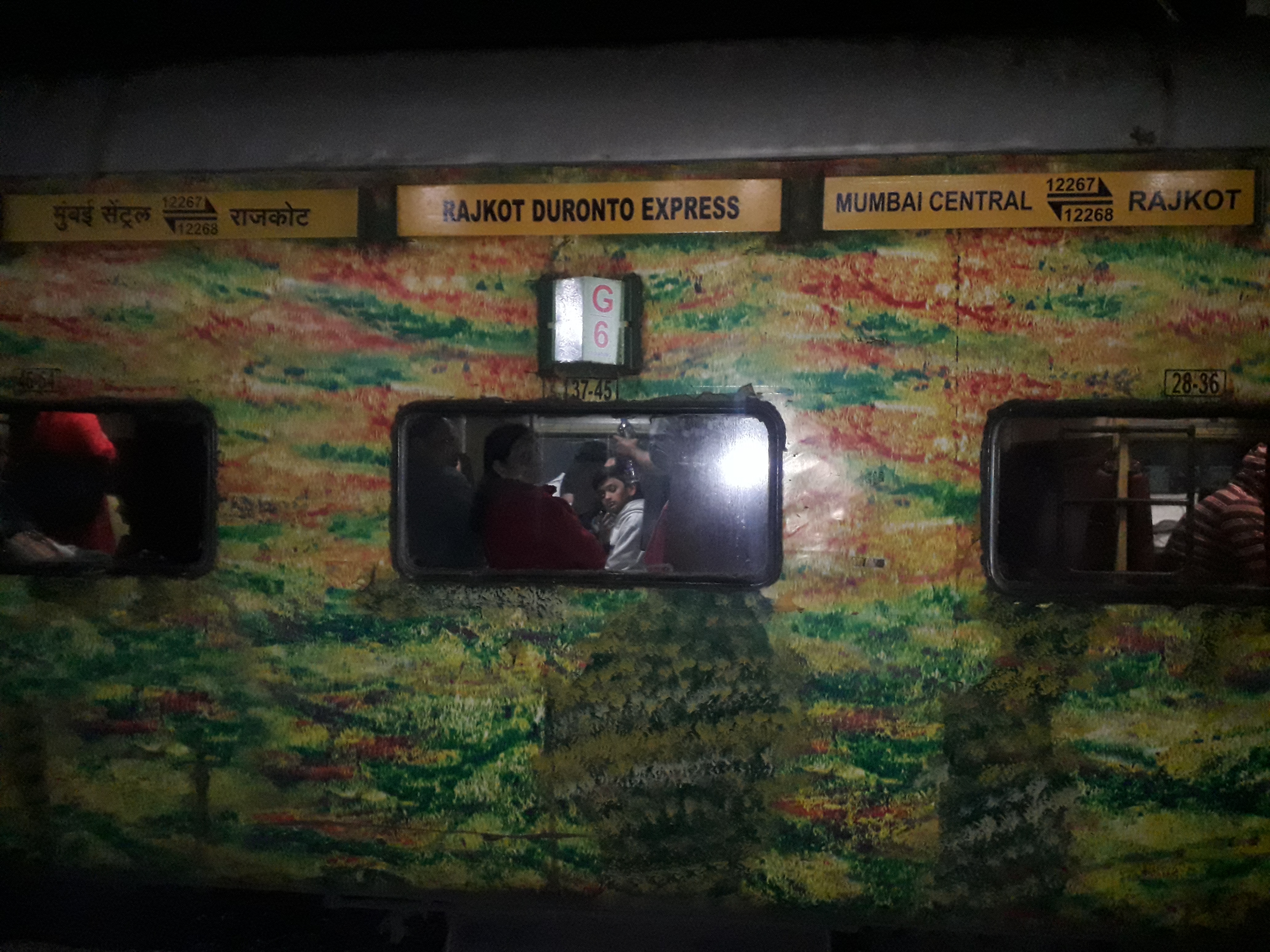
12268 Rajkot Duronto Express –Old AC 3 tier Economy

== Traction ==
Dual-traction WCAM 2/2P locos would haul the train between Mumbai Central & Ahmedabad Junction until at least March 2012 although Western Railway completed DC electric conversion to AC on 5 February 2012.

earlier was WDM-3A. It is now regularly hauled by a Vadodara-based WAP-5 or WAP-7 locomotive

This train skips Vadodara Junction & Surat. This is the only train along with Ahmedabad Pune Duronto 12297 which skips Vadodara Junction.

== See also ==
- Mumbai Central railway station
- Ahmedabad Junction railway station
- Rajkot Junction railway station
