= Bhayavadar, Rajkot =

Bhayavadar
- Town
- Location in Gujarat, India Bhayavadar (India)
- Coordinates: 21.85°N 70.25°E
- Country: India
- State: Gujarat
- District: Rajkot
- Elevation: 71 m (233 ft)

Population (2011)
  - Total: 19,404

Languages
  - Official: Gujarati
- Time zone: UTC+5:30 (IST)
- Vehicle registration: GJ
- Website: Bhayavadar Nagar Palika
- president = Atulbhai M. Vachani (BJP)

Bhayavadar is a town and a municipality in Rajkot district in the Indian state of Gujarat. It comprises seven wards.

== History ==
After the collapse of the Mughal Empire, Bhayavadar fell into the hands of the Desais, who in about 1753 sold it to Jadeja Haloji of Gondal State. The Tarikh-i-Sorath says that Kumbhoji acquired Bhayavadar, but he most likely openly assumed the sovereignty while the sale took place in Haloji's time.Bhayavadar is about eleven miles north of the Bhadar river, which is crossed by the bridge built by the Gondal Darbar at Supedi.

== Geography ==
Bhayavadar is located at 21.85°N 70.25°E. It has an average elevation of 71 metres (233 ft).

== Demographics ==
As of the 2001 India census, Bhayavadar had a population of 18,246. Males constitute 51% of the population and females 49%.

According to the 2011 census, Bhayavadar had a population of 19,404. As of 2024, the population is approximately 27,300.
