= Porbandar–Delhi Sarai Rohilla Superfast Express =

Train in India

Porbandar – Delhi Sarai Rohilla Superfast Express

Overview
- Service type: Superfast
- Locale: Gujarat, Rajasthan, Haryana & Delhi
- Current operator: Western Railway

Route
- Termini: Porbandar (PBR); Delhi Sarai Rohilla (DEE)
- Stops: 25
- Distance travelled: 1,375 km (854 mi)
- Average journey time: 23 hrs 50 mins
- Service frequency: Bi-weekly
- Train number: 20937 / 20938

On-board services
- Classes: AC First Class, AC 2 Tier, AC 3 Tier, Sleeper Class, General Unreserved
- Seating arrangements: No
- Sleeping arrangements: Yes
- Catering facilities: Pantry Car, On-board catering, E-catering
- Observation facilities: Large windows
- Baggage facilities: No
- Other facilities: Below the seats

Technical
- Rolling stock: LHB coach
- Track gauge: 1,676 mm (5 ft 6 in)
- Operating speed: 58 km/h (36 mph) average including halts.

The 20937 / 20938 Porbandar–Delhi Sarai Rohilla Superfast Express is a Superfast train belonging to the Western Railway zone that runs between Porbandar of Delhi Sarai Rohilla in India.

== Coach composition ==
The train has Modern LHB rakes with max speed of 110 km/h. The train consists of 22 coaches :

- 1 First AC Coach
- 2 AC II Tier
- 6 AC III Tier
- 6 Sleeper coaches
- 1 Pantry car
- 4 General Unreserved
- 1 Seating cum Luggage Rake
- 1 EOG Car

== Service ==
19263/Porbandar–Delhi Sarai Rohilla Superfast Express has an average speed of 58 km/h and covers 1373 km in 23 hrs 55 mins.

19264/Delhi Sarai Rohilla–Porbandar Superfast Express has an average speed of 55 km/h and covers 1373 km in 24 hrs 15 mins.

== Route and halts ==
The important halts of the train are:

- Porbandar
- Jamnagar
- Hapa
- Rajkot Junction
- Chandlodiya (Ahmedabad)
- Abu Road
- Marwar Junction
- Ajmer Junction
- Jaipur Junction
- Alwar Junction
- Rewari Junction
- Gurgaon
- Delhi Cantonment
- Delhi Sarai Rohilla

== Schedule ==
Train number	Station code	Departure station	Departure time	Departure day	Arrival station	Arrival time	Arrival day
20937	PBR	Porbandar	19:35 PM	Tue, Sat	Delhi Sarai Rohilla	19:30 PM	Sun, Wed
20938	MFP	Delhi Sarai Rohilla	08:10 AM	Mon, Thu	Porbandar	08:25 AM	Tue, Fri

== Rake sharing ==
The train shares its rake with 12905/12906 Shalimar–Porbandar Superfast Express, 19269/19270 Porbandar–Muzaffarpur Express and 19201/19202 Secunderabad–Porbandar Weekly Express.

== Traction ==
Both trains are hauled by a Vadodara Loco Shed-based WAP-5 electric locomotive from Delhi Sarai Rohilla to Porbandar and vice versa.

== See also ==
- Porbandar railway station
- Delhi Sarai Rohilla railway station
- Secunderabad–Porbandar Weekly Express
- Porbandar–Muzaffarpur Express
- Shalimar–Porbandar Superfast Express
