= Thiruvananthapuram North−Porbandar Superfast Express =

Train in India

Overview
- Service type: Superfast
- First service: 25 March 2012; 14 years ago
- Current operator: Western Railway

Route
- Termini: Thiruvananthapuram North (TVCN); Porbandar (PBR)
- Stops: 28
- Distance travelled: 2,411 km (1,498 mi)
- Average journey time: 44 hrs 15 mins
- Service frequency: Weekly
- Train number: 20909 / 20910

On-board services
- Classes: AC 2 Tier, AC 3 Tier, Sleeper Class, General Unreserved
- Seating arrangements: Yes
- Sleeping arrangements: Yes
- Catering facilities: Available
- Observation facilities: Large windows
- Baggage facilities: No
- Other facilities: Below the seats

Technical
- Rolling stock: LHB coach
- Track gauge: 1,676 mm (5 ft 6 in)
- Operating speed: 50 km/h (31 mph) average including halts.
Route map
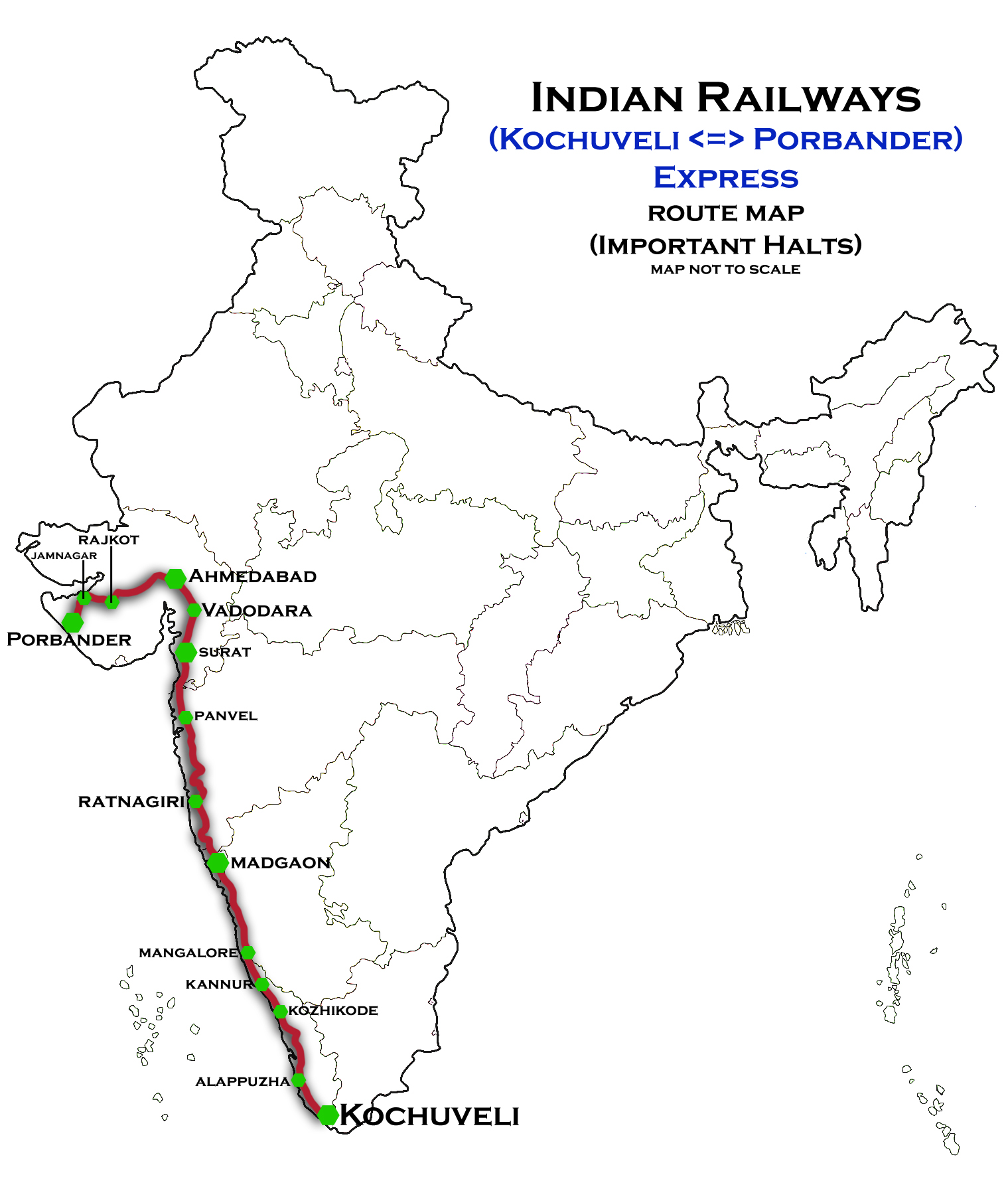

The 20909 / 20910 Thiruvananthapuram North-Porbandar Superfast Express is a superfast express train belonging to Indian Railways - Western Railway zone that runs between Thiruvananthapuram North in Thiruvananthapuram and Porbandar in India.

It operates as train number 20909 from Thiruvananthapuram North to Porbandar and as train number 20910 in the reverse direction serving the states of Kerala, Karnataka, Goa, Maharashtra and Gujarat. Since 31 March 2024, the train runs with LHB coaches

== Coaches ==
The 20909 / 10 Thiruvananthapuram North-Porbandar Superfast Express has 2 AC 2 tier, 6 AC 3 tier, 8 Sleeper Class,3 General Unreserved, 1 Pantry Car, 1 Generator Car & 1 SLR (Seating cum Luggage Rake) Coaches, thus making 22 LHB coaches from 28 March 2024. While the train was running with IRS rakes instead of LHB rakes, it had 9 sleeper coaches instead of 8 sleeper coaches and 2 SLR coaches instead of 1 SLR coach.

As is customary with most train services in India, Coach Composition may be amended at the discretion of Indian Railways depending on demand.

== Service ==
The 20909 Thiruvananthapuram North - Porbandar Superfast Express covers the distance of 2,411 km (1,498 mi) in 44 hours 15 mins (51 km/h) and in 44 hours 20 mins as 20910 Porbandar - Kochuveli Superfast Express (51 km/h).

== Route ==
The 20909 / 10 Thiruvananthapuram North−Porbandar Superfast Express runs from Thiruvananthapuram North via Ernakulam Junction, Mangalore Junction, Madgaon Junction, Panvel, Vasai Road, Palghar, Vadodara Junction, Ahmedabad Junction, Rajkot Junction to Porbandar.

== Schedule ==
Train number	Station code	Departure station	Departure time	Departure day	Arrival station	Arrival time	Arrival day
20909	KCVL	Thiruvananthapuram North	11:15 AM	Sunday	Porbandar	07:25 AM	Tuesday
20910	PBR	Porbandar	18:40 PM	Thursday	Thiruvananthapuram North	15:00 PM	Saturday

== Traction ==
As the route has been fully electrified, a Vadodara Loco Shed-based WAP-5 or WAP-7 electric locomotives powers the train from Thiruvananthapuram North to Porbandar and vice versa.
