= Porbandar railway station =

Railway station in Gujarat

General information
- Location: Porbandar, Gujarat; India
- Coordinates: 21°38′35″N 69°36′54″E
- Elevation: 7 m (23 ft)
- System: Indian Railways station
- Owner: Indian Railways
- Operator: Western Railway
- Lines: Jamnagar–Porbandar line Porbandar–Jetalsar section
- Platforms: 4
- Tracks: 4

Construction
- Structure type: Standard (on ground)
- Parking: Available

Other information
- Status: Functioning
- Station code: PBR
- Zone(s): Western Railway
- Division(s): Bhavnagar

History
- Opened: 1888; 138 years ago
- Former names: Porbandar State Railway
Location
- Location within Gujarat

Porbandar railway station (station code: PBR) is a railway station in city of Porbandar in the Indian state of Gujarat. It belongs to the Bhavnagar Division of Western Railways.

== History ==
Porbandar railway station was owned by Porbandar State Railway during the Princely rule. Porbandar–JamJodhpur metre-gauge railway line was opened in 1888 by working with Bhavnagar–Gondal–Junagad–Porbandar Railway. Later it was merged into Saurashtra Railway in 1948. Further it is under taken by Western Railway on 5 November 1951. Gauge conversion of Wansajaliya–Jetalsar section completed in 2011 giving connectivity to Somnath.

== Major trains ==
The following trains start from Porbandar railway station:

Train no.	Train name	Destination
19015/16	Porbandar–Dadar Western Saurashtra Express	Dadar
20909/10	Kochuveli−Porbandar Superfast Express	Kochuveli
19571/72	Rajkot–Porbandar Express	Rajkot Junction
20937/38	Porbandar–Delhi Sarai Rohilla Superfast Express	Delhi Sarai Rohilla
19269/70	Porbandar–Muzaffarpur Express	Muzaffarpur Junction
12905/06	Shalimar–Porbandar Superfast Express	Shalimar
12949/50	Porbandar–Santragachi Kavi Guru Express	Santragachi Junction
19201/02	Secunderabad–Porbandar Weekly Express	Secunderabad Junction
59213/14	Porbandar–Bhanvad Passenger	Bhanvad
59215/16	Porbandar–Bhanvad Passenger	Bhanvad
59205/06	Porbandar–Kanalus Passenger	Kanalus Junction
59211/12	Porbandar–Rajkot Fast Passenger	Rajkot Junction
19207/08	Porbandar– Rajkot{via jetalsar} Passenger	Rajkot Junction
59557/60	Porbandar– Bhavnagar[via jetalsar] Passenger	Bhavnagar Terminus
