= Kanalus Junction railway station =

Railway station in Gujarat, India

General information
- Location: Kanalus, Jamnagar district India
- Coordinates: 22°19′10″N 69°53′45″E
- System: Indian Railways station
- Owner: Ministry of Railways, Indian Railways
- Operator: Western Railway
- Lines: Viramgam–Okha line Jamnagar–Porbandar line
- Platforms: 3
- Tracks: 3

Construction
- Structure type: Standard (on ground)
- Parking: No

Other information
- Status: Functioning
- Station code: KNLS
- Zone(s): Western Railway
- Division(s): Rajkot
Location
- Location within India Location within Gujarat

Kanalus Junction railway station is a railway station on the Western Railway network in the state of Gujarat, India. Kanalus Junction railway station is 26 km from Jamnagar railway station. One Passenger and one Superfast train halt here.

== Trains ==
The following Superfast trains halt at the Kanalus Junction railway station in both directions:

- 22945/46 Saurashtra Mail

== See also ==
- Jamnagar district
