= Shalimar–Porbandar Superfast Express =

Train in India

Overview
- Service type: Superfast
- Locale: West Bengal, Jharkhand, Odisha, Chhattisgarh, Maharashtra & Gujarat
- First service: 13 December 1998; 27 years ago
- Current operator: Western Railway

Route
- Termini: Shalimar (SHM); Porbandar (PBR)
- Stops: 30
- Distance travelled: 2,544 km (1,581 mi)
- Average journey time: 42 hrs 24 mins
- Service frequency: Bi-weekly
- Train number: 12905 / 12906

On-board services
- Classes: AC First, AC 2 tier, AC 3 tier, Sleeper class, General Unreserved
- Seating arrangements: Yes
- Sleeping arrangements: Yes
- Catering facilities: Available
- Baggage facilities: No
- Other facilities: Below the seats

Technical
- Rolling stock: ICF coach
- Track gauge: 1,676 mm (5 ft 6 in)
- Operating speed: 58 km/h (36 mph) average including halts.
Route map
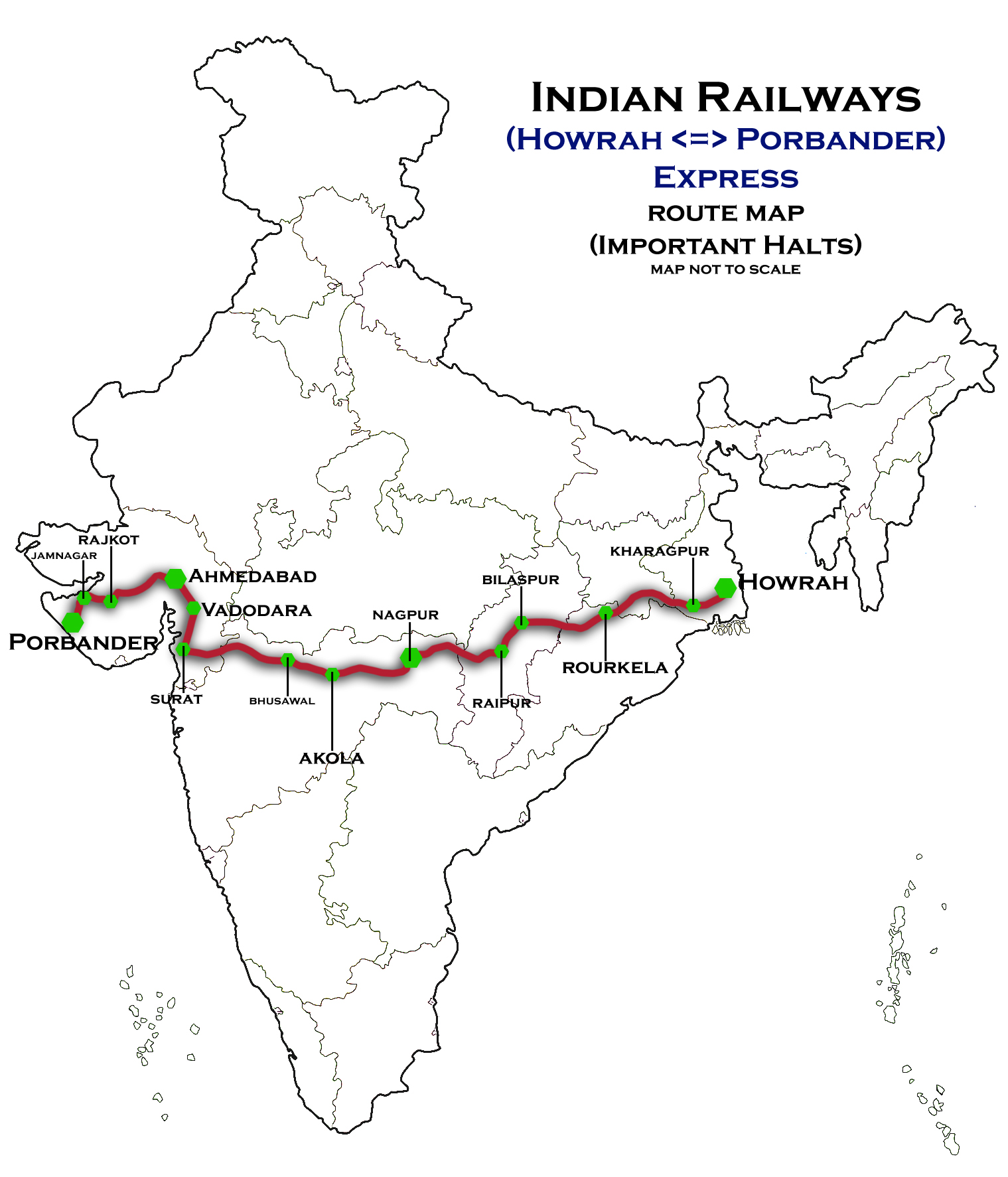

The 12905 / 12906 Shalimar–Porbandar Superfast Express is a Superfast train of Indian Railways, running between Shalimar in West Bengal and Porbandar in Gujarat. The train is named Aradhana Express by Indian Railway. The train is very much important and popular train in the route and connects eastern India to extreme west part of country. The train is as important as Jnaneshwari Express.

It is now run on a biweekly schedule using train numbers 12905 and 12906.

== Coach composition ==
The train has standard ICF Ukrisht rakes with max speed of 110 kmph. The train consists of 24 coaches:

- 1 AC First Class
- 2 AC II Tier
- 6 AC III Tier
- 9 Sleeper coaches
- 1 Pantry car
- 3 General Unreserved
- 2 Seating cum Luggage Rake

== Service ==
- The 12905/Porbandar–Shalimar Superfast Express has an average speed of 60 km/h and covers 2544 km in 42 hrs 30 mins.
- The 12906/Shalimar–Porbandar Superfast Express has an average speed of 60 km/h and covers 2544 km in 42 hrs 35 mins.

== Route & halts ==
The important halts of the train are:

- Shalimar
- Kharagpur Junction
- Tatanagar Junction
- Rourkela
- Jharsuguda
- Champa Junction
- Bilaspur Junction
- Raipur Junction
- Durg Junction
- Gondia Junction
- Nagpur Junction
- Badnera Junction
- Akola Junction
- Bhusaval Junction
- Surat
- Vadodara Junction
- Ahmedabad Junction
- Viramgam Junction
- Surendranagar Junction
- Rajkot Junction
- Hapa
- Jamnagar
- Porbandar

== Schedule ==
Train number	Station code	Departure station	Departure time	Departure day	Arrival station	Arrival time	Arrival day
12905	PBR	Porbandar	08:50 AM	Wed, Thu	Shalimar	03:20 AM	Fri, Sat
12906	SHM	Shalimar	21:05 PM	Fri, Sat	Porbandar	15:40 PM	Sun, Mon

== Traction ==
The train is hauled by a Vatva Loco Shed based WAP-4 electric locomotive and Malda Town-based WDM-3A from Shalimar to Porbandar and vice-versa.

== Gallery ==
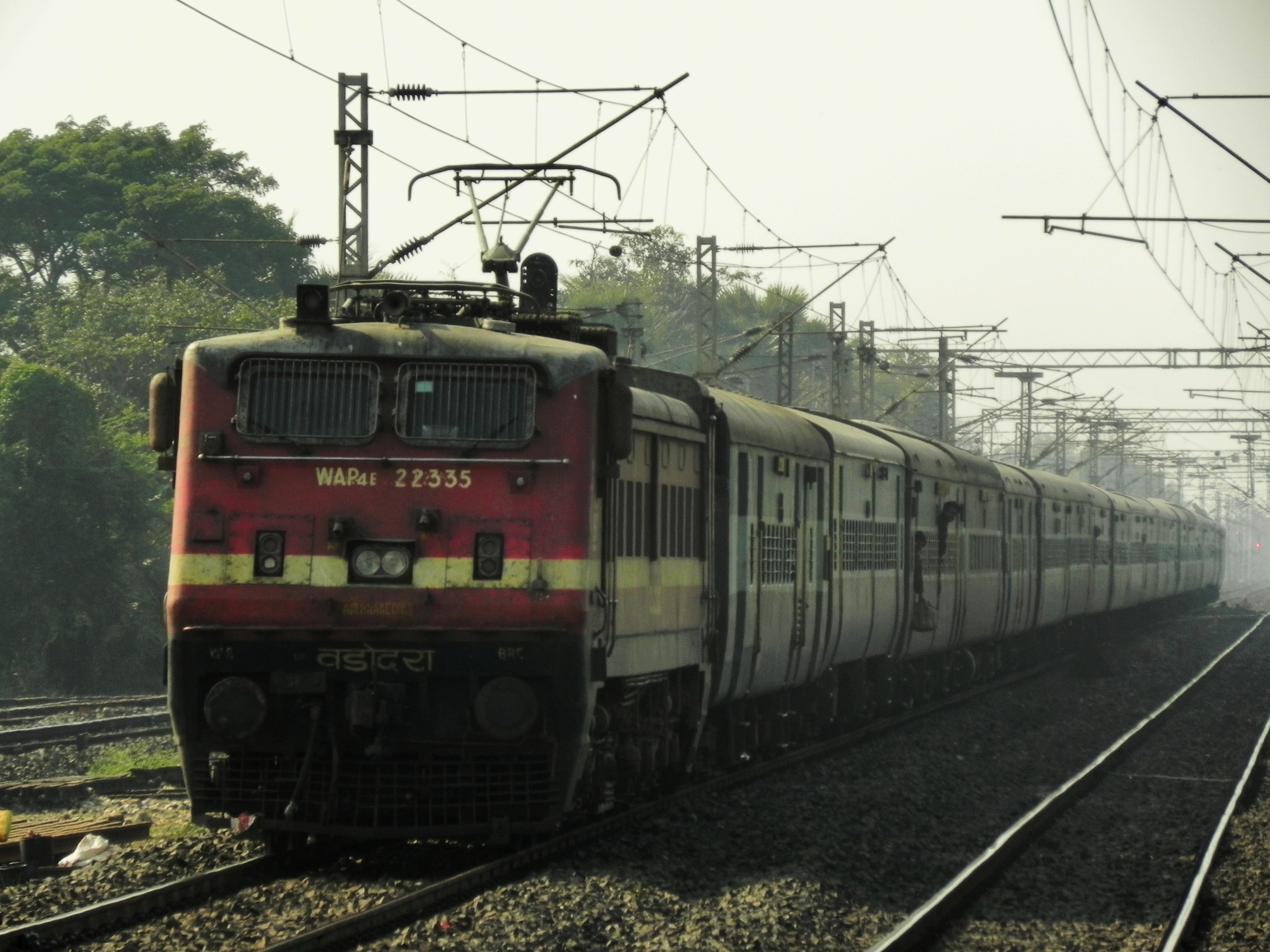
12906 (Porbandar–Shalimar) Aradhana Express

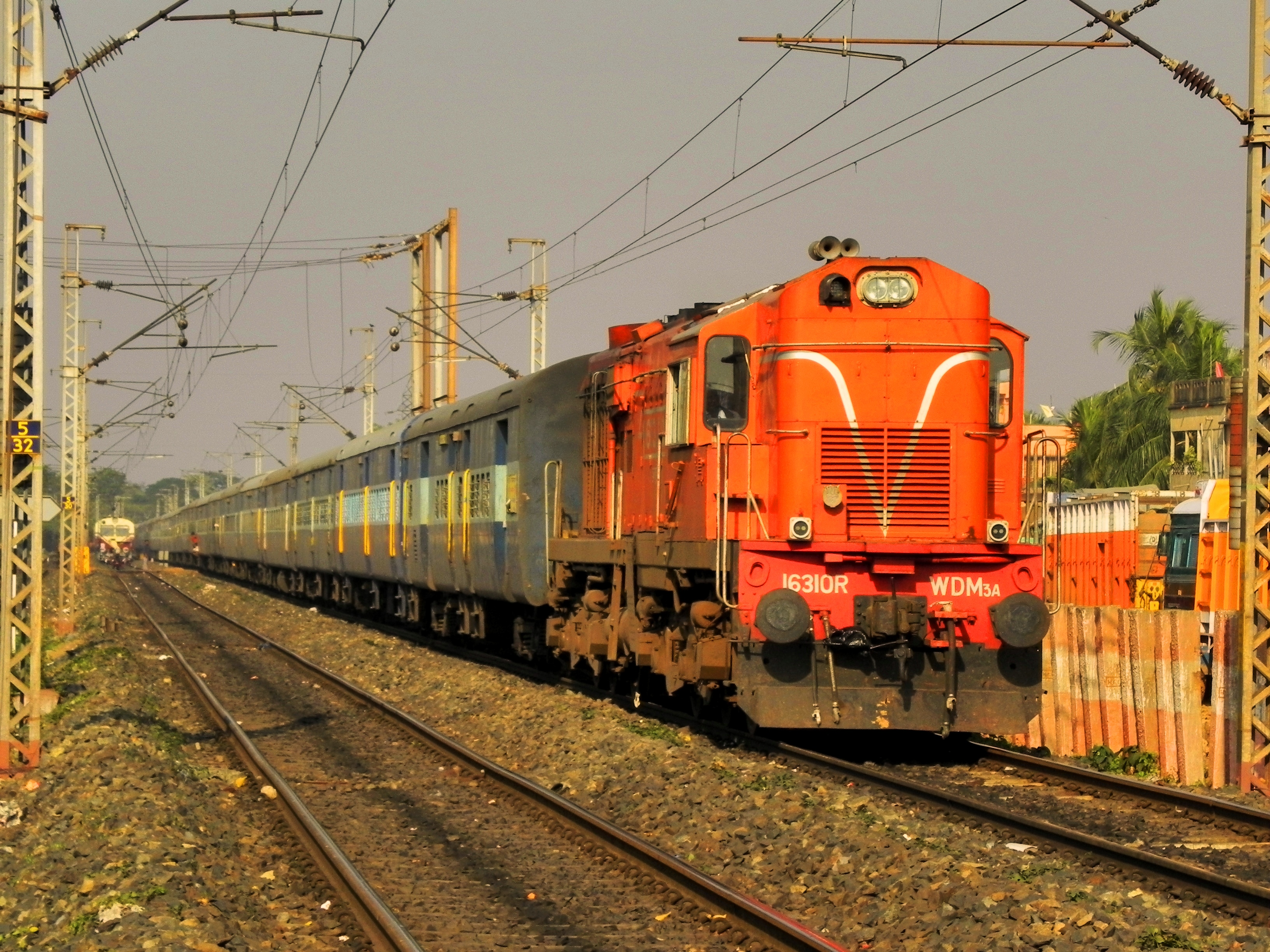
Shalimar–Porbandar Aradhana Express

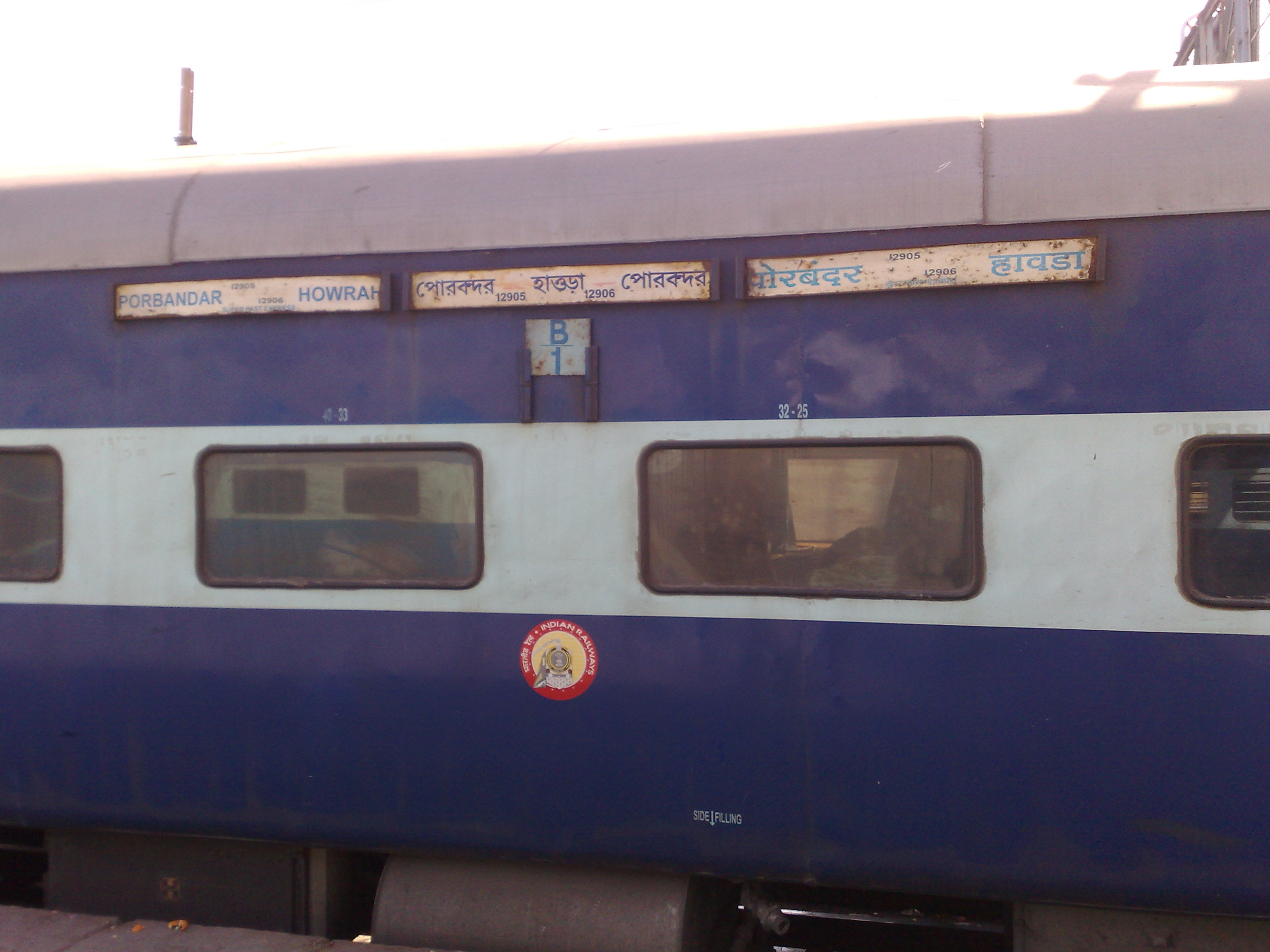
Shalimar–Porbandar Express – AC 3 tier coach

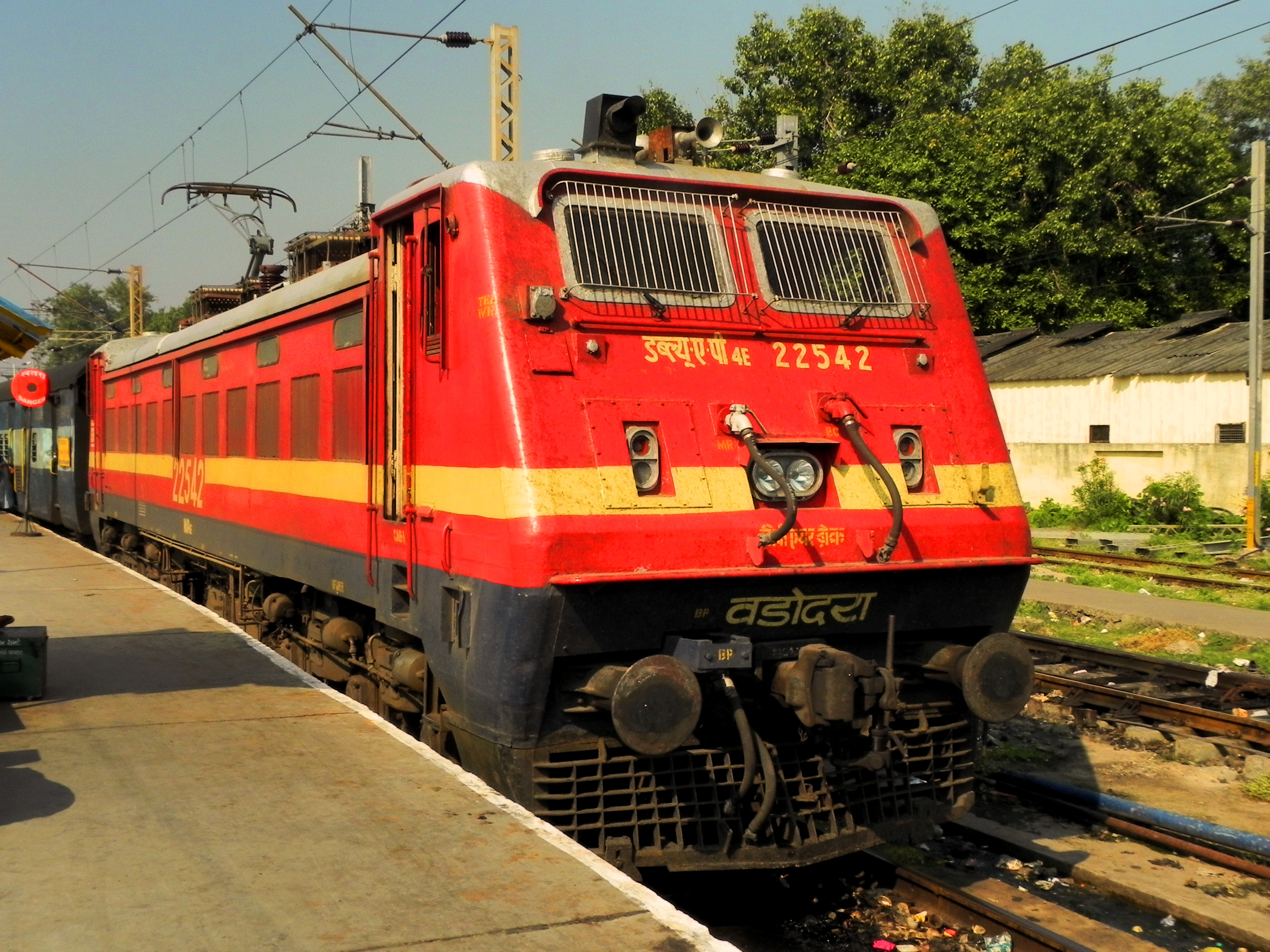
Shalimar–Porbandar Aradhana Express

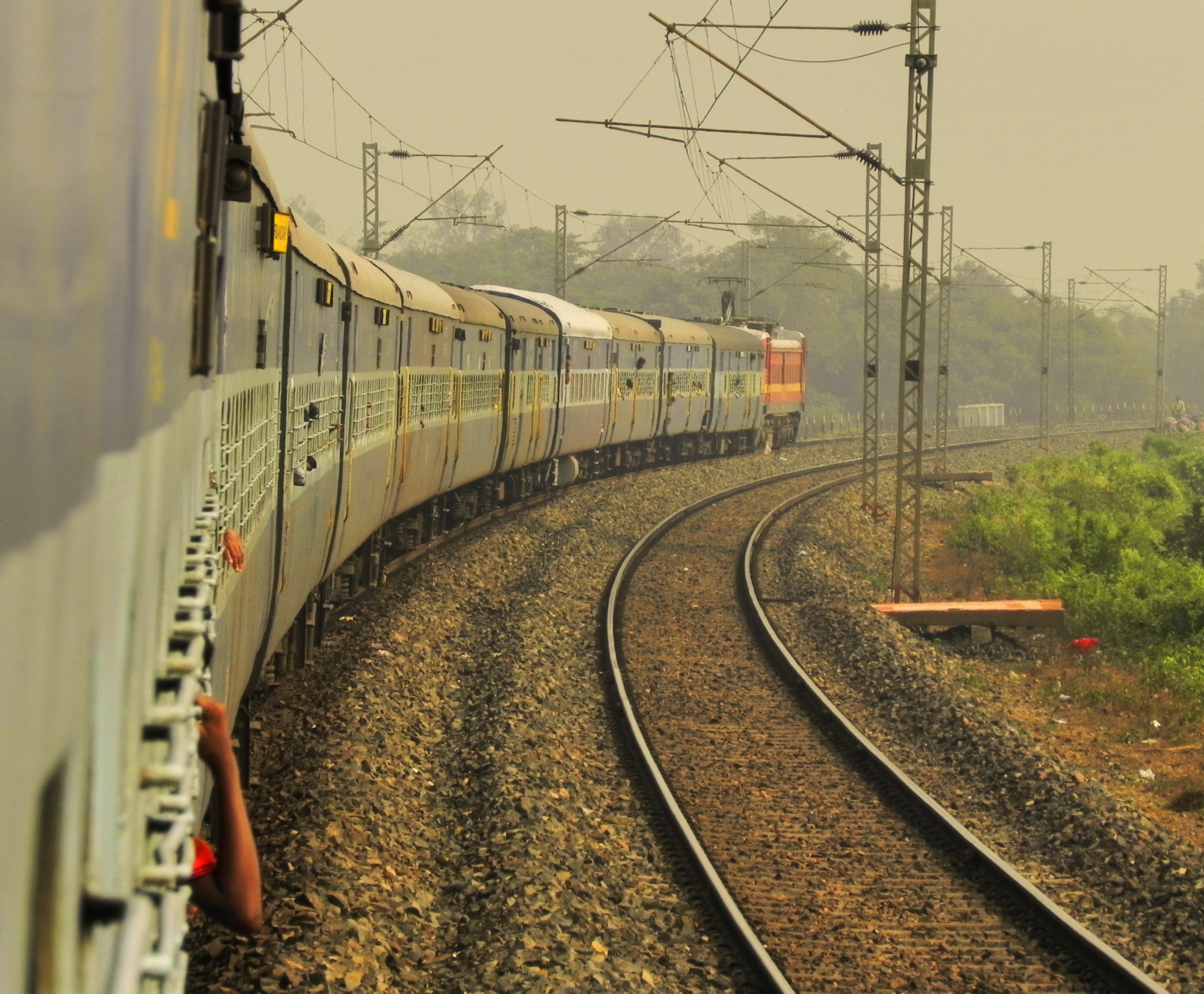
Shalimar–Porbandar Aradhana Express
