= Hapa railway station =

Railway station in Gujarat, India

General information
- Location: Jamnagar, Gujarat; India
- Coordinates: 22°28′07″N 70°07′05″E
- Elevation: 16 m (52 ft)
- System: Indian Railways station
- Owner: Indian Railways
- Operator: Western Railway
- Line: Viramgam–Okha line
- Platforms: 3
- Tracks: 1

Construction
- Structure type: Standard
- Parking: Yes

Other information
- Status: Functioning
- Station code: HAPA
- Zone(s): Western Railway
- Division(s): Rajkot
Location
- Location within Gujarat Location within India

Hapa railway station is a railway station in the city of Jamnagar in Gujarat, India. It is located in the Western Railway zone of Rajkot Division. Hapa railway station is located in Hapa tehsil of Jamnagar district and lies on the eastern outskirts of Jamnagar. A few express passenger trains originate and terminate at Hapa. Saurashtra Express, Saurashtra Mail and some other trains also halt at Hapa.

== Major trains ==
The train which originates from Hapa are :

Train No.	Train name	Destination
12475 / 12476	Hapa–Shri Mata Vaishno Devi Katra Superfast Express	Shri Mata Vaishno Devi Katra
22907 / 22908	Madgaon–Hapa Superfast Express	Madgaon
22939 / 22940	Hapa–Bilaspur Superfast Express	Bilaspur
12267 / 12268	Mumbai Central–Hapa Duronto Express	Mumbai Central
