= Porbandar–Jetalsar section =

Railway line in India

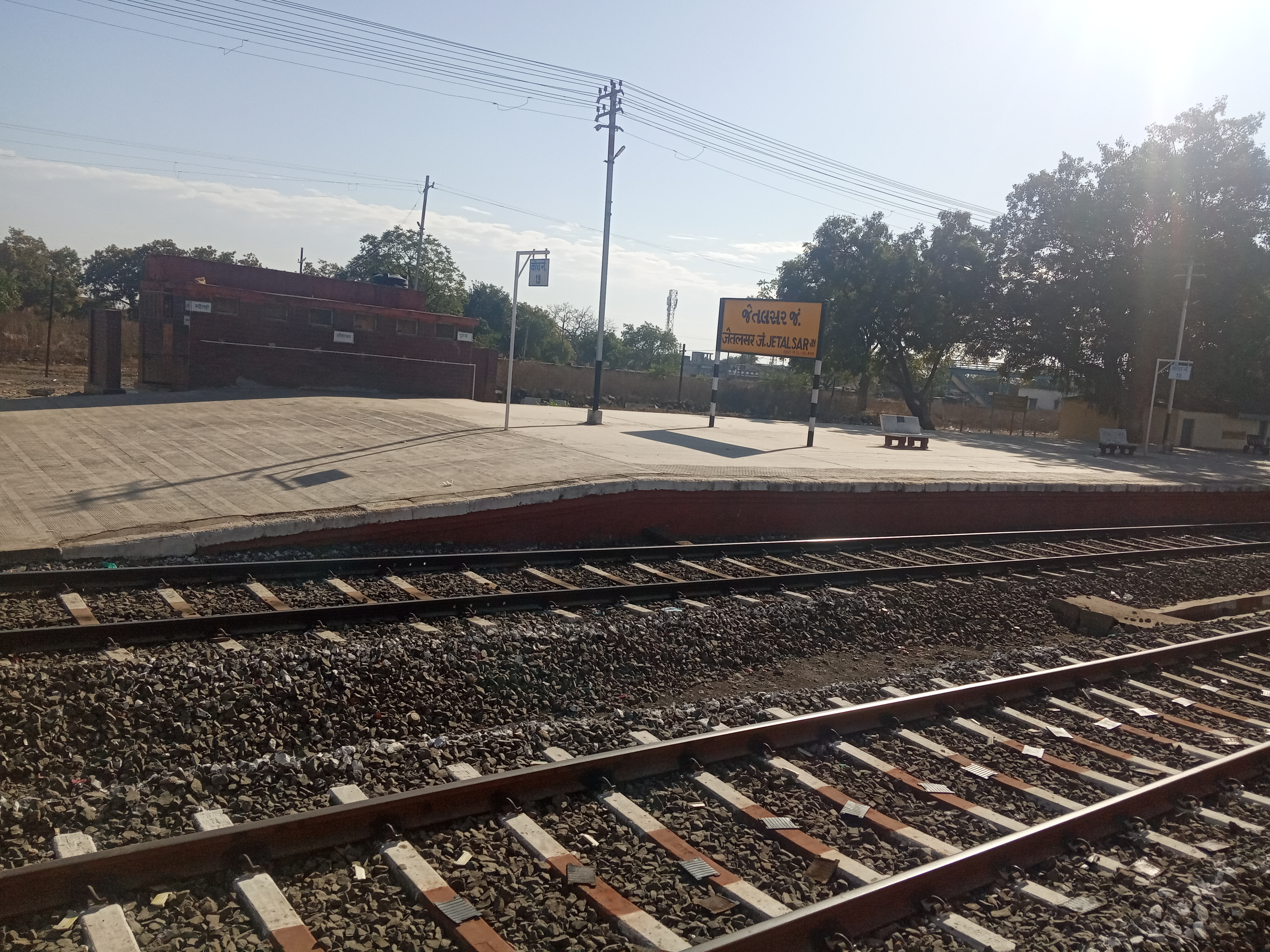
- Jetalsar Junction the starting station of Porbandar–Jetalsar section

Overview
- Status: Operational
- Owner: Indian Railways
- Locale: Gujarat
- Termini: Porbandar; Jetalsar

Service
- Operator(s): Western Railway

History
- Opened: 1890

Technical
- Track length: 124 km (77 mi)
- Number of tracks: 1
- Track gauge: 5 ft 6 in (1,676 mm) broad gauge
- Electrification: Yes

The Porbandar–Jetalsar section is a 124 km (77 mi) length of railroad track that connects Porbandar to Jetalsar. It belongs to the Western Railway of Bhavnagar Division in Gujarat, India.

== History ==
Porbandar–Jamjodhpur was opened by the Porbandar Railway in 1888, while Jetalsar–Rajkot was opened in 1890 by Jetalsar-Rajkot Railway completing the full section with the support of other Princely state railways. Gauge conversion was completed in 2011.
