= Saurashtra Express =

Train in India

Overview
- Service type: Express
- Locale: Maharashtra & Gujarat
- Current operator: Western Railway

Route
- Termini: Dadar (DDR); Porbandar (PBR)
- Stops: 54
- Distance travelled: 947 km (588 mi)
- Average journey time: 20 hours 10 minutes
- Service frequency: Daily
- Train number: 19015 / 19016

On-board services
- Classes: AC 3 Tier, Sleeper Class, General Unreserved
- Seating arrangements: Yes
- Sleeping arrangements: Yes
- Catering facilities: On-board catering, E-catering
- Observation facilities: Large windows
- Baggage facilities: Available
- Other facilities: Below the seats

Technical
- Rolling stock: ICF coach
- Track gauge: 1,676 mm (5 ft 6 in)
- Operating speed: 110 km/h (68 mph) maximum, 47 km/h (29 mph) average including halts.
- Rake sharing: 19003/19004 Khandesh Express
Route map
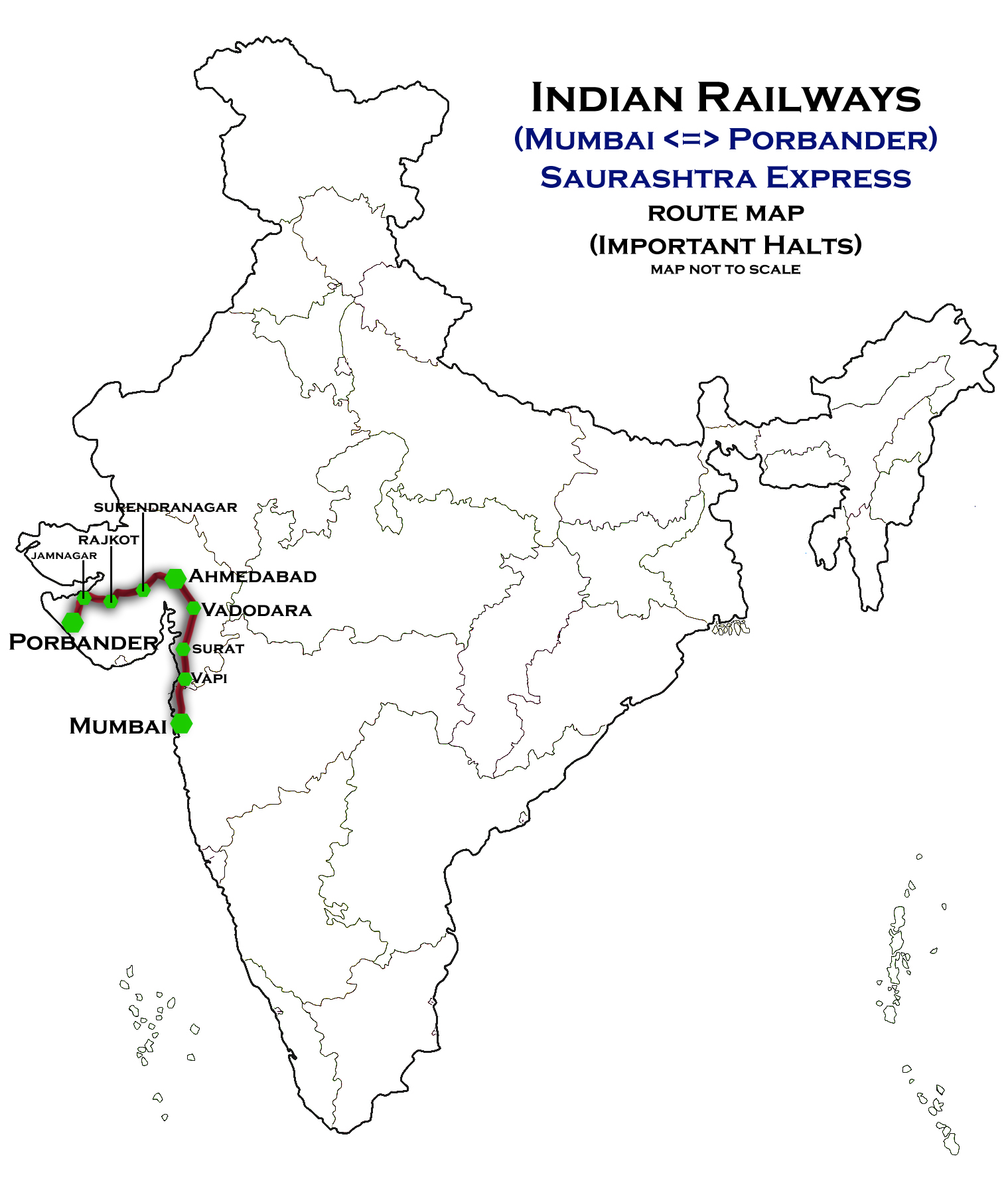

The 19015 / 19016 Saurashtra Express is an express train of Indian Railways that runs between Dadar and Porbandar in India.

It operates as train number 19015 from Dadar Western to Porbandar and as train number 19016 in the reverse direction. It is named after Saurashtra region of Gujarat.

On, 1-January-2018 the train number of Saurashtra Express was changed from 19215 / 19216 to 19015 / 19016.

== Coaches ==
The 19015/19016 Saurashtra Express presently has 3 "AC II tier", "3 AC III tier", 9 Sleeper Class, 4 General Unreserved & 2 seating - cum -luggage rake coaches.

As with most train services in India, coach composition may be amended at the discretion of Indian Railways depending on demand.

== Service ==
The 19015 Saurashtra Express covers the distance of 947 kilometres in 20 hours 0 mins (44.42 km/h) & in 20 hours 40 mins (43.08 km/h) as 19016 Saurashtra Express.

As the average speed of the train is below 55 km/h, as per Indian Railways rules, its fare does not include a Superfast surcharge.

== Route ==
The 19015 / 19016 Saurashtra Express runs from Dadar via Palghar, Surat, Vadodara Junction, Ahmedabad Junction, Rajkot Junction, Jamnagar to Porbandar and vice versa.

== Schedule ==
Train number	Station code	Departure station	Departure time	Departure day	Arrival station	Arrival time	Arrival day
19015	DDR	Dadar	09:20 AM	Daily	Porbandar	05:30 AM	Daily
19016	PBR	Porbandar	22:40 PM	Daily	Dadar	19:30 PM	Daily

== Traction ==
Prior to Western Railways switching to AC system, the Saurashtra Express would be hauled by a WCAM-1 engine until Porbandar

As Western Railways switched over to AC system on 5 February 2012, it is now hauled by a WAP-5 or WAP-7 electric locomotive from the Vadodara Loco Shed from end to end .
