= Jamnagar–Porbandar line =

Railway line in India

Overview
- Status: Operational
- Owner: Indian Railways
- Locale: Gujarat
- Termini: Jamnagar; Porbandar

Service
- Operator(s): Western Railway

History
- Opened: 1946

Technical
- Track length: 44 km (27 mi)
- Number of tracks: 1
- Track gauge: 5 ft 6 in (1,676 mm) broad gauge
- Electrification: Yes
- Operating speed: up to 80 km/h

The Jamnagar–Porbandar line belongs to Western Railway of Rajkot Division.

== History ==
The Jamnagar–Porbandar railway metre-gauge railway was opened for traffic in 1946 jointly by Porbandar Railway and Dwaraka & Jamnagar Railway. After then it was merged into Saurashtra Railway in April 1948. Later Western Railway came into existence on 5 November 1951. Gauge conversion of the Jamnagar–Porbandar section completed in the early 1980s.
