= Transport in Surat =

Transport in Surat is shared by public and private transport. Surat, India has Rapid Transport System with BRTS Surat, Surat Metro (Under Construction), Railways etc. Surat has 861 Buses.

== Road ==
=== Bus ===
Surat City Bus & Surat BRTS also Known As Sitilink, It consists of 1136 buses and runs on 66 different routes, covering 85 per cent of urban area. More than 3.50 lakh passengers use public transport daily.

=== Taxis ===
Surat has taxi services which primarily operate around Surat Railway station. Surat also has private cab services such as Ola Cabs, Uber, and Rapido. There are also self-driving car rental services, with private companies like Just Drive - Self Drive Cars.

=== Rickshaws ===
Auto rickshaws are the most commonly used mode of public transport in Surat.

== Rail ==
=== Railway ===
Surat railway station is the main railway station of Surat along with Gothangam, Kosad, Utran, Udhna Junction, Bhestan, Niyol, Maroli and Sachin. It is the 2nd busiest railway station after Borivali in the Mumbai division of Western Railways, and is soon to be developed as a Multi-Modal Transportation Hub (MMTH).

=== Metro ===
Surat Metro is under Construction. It has 2 lines, the Green Line and the Red Line, and contains 38 stations.

=== Bullet Train ===
Surat will be part of the Mumbai–Ahmedabad High Speed Rail Corridor, also known as the Mumbai–Ahmedabad Bullet Train.

== Ferry ==
Surat has Ferry Service operating from Hazira to Ghogha of Bhavnagar District. This service is 90 km long and operates twice a day.

== Air ==
Surat International Airport is the nearest airport to Surat with direct connectivity to Sharjah and Dubai.

Surat Airport is also connected via major cities of India, such as Bangalore, Delhi, Hyderabad, Kolkata, Chennai, Coimbatore, Diu, Goa–Dabolim, Goa–Mopa, Indore, Jaipur, Udaipur, Pune Belgaum, and Kishangarh, operated by major airlines like Air India Express, IndiGo, SpiceJet, and Star Air.

The expanded terminal of Surat International Airport was inaugurated by Prime Minister Narendra Modi on December 17, 2023.

== See also ==
- Transport in India
