= Borivali–Surat MEMU =

Overview
- Service type: MEMU
- Current operator: Western Railway zone

Route
- Termini: Borivali (BVI); Surat (ST)
- Stops: 7
- Distance travelled: 234 km (145 mi)
- Average journey time: 5 hours 50 minutes
- Service frequency: Daily (Note: Runs seven days in a week for every direction.)
- Train number: 69139//69140

On-board services
- Class: General Unreserved
- Seating arrangements: Yes
- Sleeping arrangements: No
- Catering facilities: No
- Observation facilities: ICF coach
- Entertainment facilities: No
- Baggage facilities: Below the seats

Technical
- Rolling stock: 1
- Track gauge: 1,676 mm (5 ft 6 in)
- Operating speed: 40 km/h (25 mph) average with halts

Borivali–Surat MEMU is a DEMU train belonging to Western Railway zone that runs between Borivali in Maharashtra and Surat of Gujarat. It is currently being operated with 69139//69140 train numbers on daily basis.

== Route and halts ==
The important halts of the train are:

- Borivali
- Vasai Road
- Virar
- Palghar
- Boisar
- Dahanu Road
- Sanjan
- Vapi
- Atul
- Valsad
- Bilimora Junction
- Navsari
- Sachin
- Udhna Junction
- Surat

== Average speed and frequency ==
- 69139/Borivali–Surat MEMU has average speed of 40 km/h and completes 234 km in 5 hour 50 minutes.
- 69140/Surat–Borivali MEMU has average speed of 52 km/h and completes 234 km in 2 hour 40 minutes. There are seven trains which run on a daily basis

== Schedule ==
Train number	Departure station	Departure time	Departure day	Arrival station	Arrival time	Arrival day
69139	Borivali	07:10	Daily	Surat	13:00	Daily
69140	Surat	20:20	Daily	Borivali	23:00	Daily

== Traction ==
DEMU: Rated power is 1600 HP and has 10 coaches with maximum speed is 130 kmph. Transmission is AC electric. Rakes are made at ICF coach.

== Rake sharing ==
The rake is being shared with Surat–Bharuch MEMU and Virar–Bharuch MEMU.

== See also ==
- Surat–Bharuch MEMU
- Virar–Bharuch MEMU
