= Mumbai Central–Valsad Fast Passenger =

Train in India

Overview
- Service type: Passenger
- Locale: Gujarat & Maharashtra
- Current operator: Western Railway

Route
- Termini: Mumbai Central (MMCT); Valsad (BL)
- Stops: 19
- Distance travelled: 195 km (121 mi)
- Average journey time: 4h 45m
- Service frequency: Daily (Note: Runs seven days in a week for every direction.)
- Train number: 59023/59024

On-board services
- Class: Unreserved
- Seating arrangements: Yes
- Sleeping arrangements: No
- Catering facilities: No
- Observation facilities: ICF coach
- Entertainment facilities: No
- Baggage facilities: No
- Other facilities: Below the seats

Technical
- Rolling stock: 2
- Track gauge: 1,676 mm (5 ft 6 in)
- Operating speed: 41 km/h (25 mph) average with halts

The Mumbai Central–Valsad Fast Passenger is a passenger train belonging to Western Railway zone that runs between Mumbai Central and Valsad. It is currently being operated with 59023/59024 train numbers on a daily basis.

This train along with Flying Ranee were the only trains which used Non-AC Double deckers rake, until they had to be discontinued after they completed their codal life.

== Average speed and frequency ==
The 59023/Mumbai Central–Valsad Fast Passenger runs with an average speed of 41 km/h and covers 195 km in 4h 45m. The 59024/Valsad–Mumbai Central Fast Passenger runs with an average speed of 44 km/h and completes 195 km in 4h 20m.

== Route and halts ==
The important halts of the train are:

- Mumbai Central
- Dadar
- Borivali
- Virar
- Vaitarna
- Saphale
- Kelve Road
- Palghar
- Boisar
- Vangaon
- Dahanu Road
- Gholvad
- Umargam Road
- Sanjan
- Bhilad
- Vapi
- Udvada
- Pardi
- Atul
- Valsad

== Coach composition ==
earlier was run with Double Decker coach in Utkrisht livery. The train has standard ICF rakes with a maximum speed of 110 km/h. The train consists of 22 coaches:

- 16 General Unreserved
- 4 First Class Unreserved
- 2 First Class Ladies Unreserved
- 2 Seating cum Luggage Rake

== Traction ==
Both trains are hauled by a Vadodara Loco Shed-based WAP-5 electric locomotive from Mumbai Central to Valsad and vice versa.

== See also ==
- Mumbai Central railway station
- Valsad railway station
- Flying Ranee
