= Valsad–Surat MEMU =

Train in India

Overview
- Service type: MEMU
- Locale: Gujarat
- Current operator(s): Western Railway

Route
- Termini: Valsad (BL); Surat (ST)
- Stops: 11
- Distance travelled: 69 km (43 mi)
- Average journey time: 2 hrs
- Service frequency: Daily
- Train number(s): 69151 / 69152

On-board services
- Class(es): General Unreserved
- Seating arrangements: Yes
- Sleeping arrangements: No
- Auto-rack arrangements: Overhead racks
- Catering facilities: No
- Observation facilities: Large windows
- Baggage facilities: No
- Other facilities: Below the seats

Technical
- Rolling stock: ICF coach
- Track gauge: 1,676 mm (5 ft 6 in)
- Operating speed: 34 km/h (21 mph) average including halts.

The 69151 / 69152 Valsad–Surat MEMU is a MEMU train of the Indian Railways connecting Valsad and Surat of Gujarat. It is currently being operated with 69151/69152 train numbers on a daily basis.

== Service ==
- 69151/Valsad–Surat MEMU has average speed of 34 km/h and covers 69 km in 2 hrs.
- 69152/Surat–Valsad MEMU has average speed of 33 km/h and covers 69 km in 2 hrs 5 min.

== Route ==
The 69151/52 Valsad–Surat MEMU runs from Valsad via Dungri, Bilimora Junction, Amalsad, Navsari, Maroli, Sachin, Udhna Junction to Surat and vice versa.

== Coach composition ==
The train consists of 20 MEMU rake coaches.

== Rake sharing ==
The train shares its rake with 69153/69154 Umargam Road–Valsad MEMU and 69111/69112 Surat–Vadodara MEMU.
