= Sanjan–Surat MEMU =

Indian train route

Overview
- Service type: MEMU
- Current operator(s): Western Railway zone

Route
- Termini: Sanjan (SJN); Surat (ST)
- Stops: 20
- Distance travelled: 118 km (73 mi)
- Average journey time: 3 hrs
- Service frequency: Daily
- Train number(s): 69141/69142

On-board services
- Class(es): Unreserved
- Seating arrangements: Yes
- Sleeping arrangements: No
- Catering facilities: No
- Entertainment facilities: No

Technical
- Rolling stock: 2
- Track gauge: 1,676 mm (5 ft 6 in)
- Operating speed: 39 km/h (24 mph)

The 69141/69142 Sanjan–Surat MEMU is a MEMU train of the Indian Railways connecting Sanjan and Surat of Gujarat. It is currently being operated with 69141/69142 train numbers on a daily basis.

== Service ==
- 69141 Sanjan–Surat MEMU has average speed of 39 km/h and covers 118 km in 3 hrs.
- 69142 Surat–Sanjan MEMU has average speed of 39 km/h and covers 118 km in 3 hrs.

== Route ==
The 69141/42 Sanjan–Surat MEMU runs from Sanjan via Vapi, Valsad, Navsari, Udhna Junction to Surat, and vice versa.

== Coach composition ==
The train consists of 20 MEMU rake coaches.
