= Bandra Terminus–Surat Intercity Express =

Train in India

Bandra Terminus-Surat Intercity Express
Overview
- Service type: Superfast
- Locale: Maharashtra & Gujarat
- Current operator: Western Railway

Route
- Termini: Bandra Terminus (BDTS); Surat (ST)
- Stops: 8
- Distance travelled: 252 km (157 mi)
- Average journey time: 3 hours 45 minutes
- Service frequency: Daily
- Train number: 12935 / 12936

On-board services
- Classes: AC Chair Car, First Class, Second Class Seating, General Unreserved
- Seating arrangements: Yes
- Sleeping arrangements: No
- Auto-rack arrangements: Overhead racks
- Catering facilities: On-board Catering, E-Catering
- Observation facilities: Large windows
- Baggage facilities: Available
- Other facilities: Below the seats

Technical
- Rolling stock: LHB coach
- Track gauge: 1,676 mm (5 ft 6 in)
- Operating speed: 130 km/h (81 mph) maximum, 65 km/h (40 mph) average excluding halts

The 12935 / 12936 Bandra Terminus-Surat Intercity Express is an Intercity express train belonging to Indian Railways that runs between Bandra Terminus and Surat of India. A daily service, it operates as train number 12935 from Bandra Terminus to Surat and as train number 12936 in the reverse direction.

== Coaches ==
12935/36 Bandra Terminus - Surat Intercity Express has been running with LHB rake since 23 January 2021 and it consisted of 22 coaches:

- 1 Generator Car (EOG)
- 11 Second Sitting (D1-D11)
- 5 AC Chair Car (C1-C5)
- 4 General Unreserved (GS)
- 1 Sitting cum Luggage Rake (SLR)

As with most train services in India, Coach composition may be amended at the discretion of Indian Railways depending on demand.

== Service ==
12935/12936 Bandra Terminus - Surat Intercity Express initially ran as 19035/36 which was later converted to the present train no. 12935/36.

It is a daily service covering the distance of 252 km in 3 hours 45 mins in both directions giving an average speed of 65 km/h.

== Route & halts ==
The important halts of the train are:

- Bandra Terminus
- Andheri
- Borivali
- Virar
- Palghar
- Boisar
- Umargam Road
- Vapi
- Valsad
- Bilimora
- Navsari
- Surat

== Traction ==
It is regularly hauled by a Vadodara Loco Shed-based WAP-5 / WAP-7 electric locomotive from end to end.

== Rake sharing ==
No Rake Sharing.
