= Sachin railway station =

Railway station in Gujarat, India

General information
- Location: Kansad Road, Sachin, Gujarat; India
- Coordinates: 21°04′40″N 72°52′28″E
- Elevation: 108 metres (354 ft)
- System: Indian Railways station
- Owner: Ministry of Railways, Indian Railways
- Operator: Western Railway
- Lines: New Delhi–Mumbai main line Ahmedabad–Mumbai main line
- Platforms: 3
- Tracks: 4
- Connections: Auto stand

Construction
- Structure type: Standard (on ground)
- Parking: No
- Cycle facilities: No
- Accessible: Yes

Other information
- Status: Functioning
- Station code: SCH
- Zone(s): Western Railway
- Division(s): Mumbai WR

Services
Preceding station	Indian Railways	Following station
Bhestan towards ?	New Delhi–Mumbai main line	Maroli towards ?
Location
- Location within India Location within Gujarat

Sachin railway station is a small railway station in Surat district, Gujarat, India. The station code of Sachin is SCH. The station consists of three platforms. The platforms are well sheltered. It has many facilities including water and sanitation. The station lies on the Mumbai–Ahmedabad–Jaipur–Delhi main line. Sachin is also in Western Dedicated Freight Corridor of India.

== Major trains ==
- 59037/38 Virar–Surat Passenger
- 19033/34 Gujarat Queen (Valsad–Ahmedabad)
- 59441/42 Ahmedabad–Mumbai Central Passenger
- 12921/22 Flying Ranee (Mumbai Central–Surat)
- 59049/50 Valsad–Viramgam Passenger
- 59439/40 Mumbai Central–Ahmedabad Passenger
- 69149/50 Virar–Bharuch MEMU
- 69141/42 Sanjan–Surat MEMU
- 69151/52 Valsad–Surat MEMU^{†}
- 09069 Vapi–Surat Passenger Special (Note: Limited-period-running train)
- 69139 Borivali–Surat MEMU
- 09070 Surat–Valsad MEMU Special (Note: Limited-period-running train)
- 59048 Surat–Valsad Shuttle (Note: Limited-period-running train)

^{†}Note: Rake sharing with 69111/12 Surat–Vadodara MEMU and 69153/54 Umargam Road–Valsad MEMU
