= Bhestan =

- Town
- Location in Gujarat, India Bhestan (India)
- Coordinates: 21.121587°N 72.861104°E
- Country: India
- State: Gujarat
- District: Surat

Population (2011)
  - Total: 52,936

Languages
  - Official: Gujarati, Hindi
- Time zone: UTC+5:30 (IST)
- PIN: 395023
- Vehicle registration: GJ
- Website: gujaratindia.com

Bhestan is a town and locality in Surat city of Surat district in the Indian state of Gujarat.

== Demographics ==
As of 2011 India census, Bhestan had a population of 52,936: Males constitute 62.40% of the population and females 37.60%.

== Transport ==
=== BRTS ===
Bhestan is well connected to Udhna Darwaja and Sachin GIDC by Surat BRTS.

=== Railway ===
Bhestan railway station is located on the Western Railway Mumbai – Vadodara Segment. It is 10 km from Surat, 138 km from Vadodara and 254 km from Mumbai.
