= Chennai Central–Ahmedabad Humsafar Express =

Train in India

MGR Chennai Central - Ahmedabad Jn. Humsafar Express
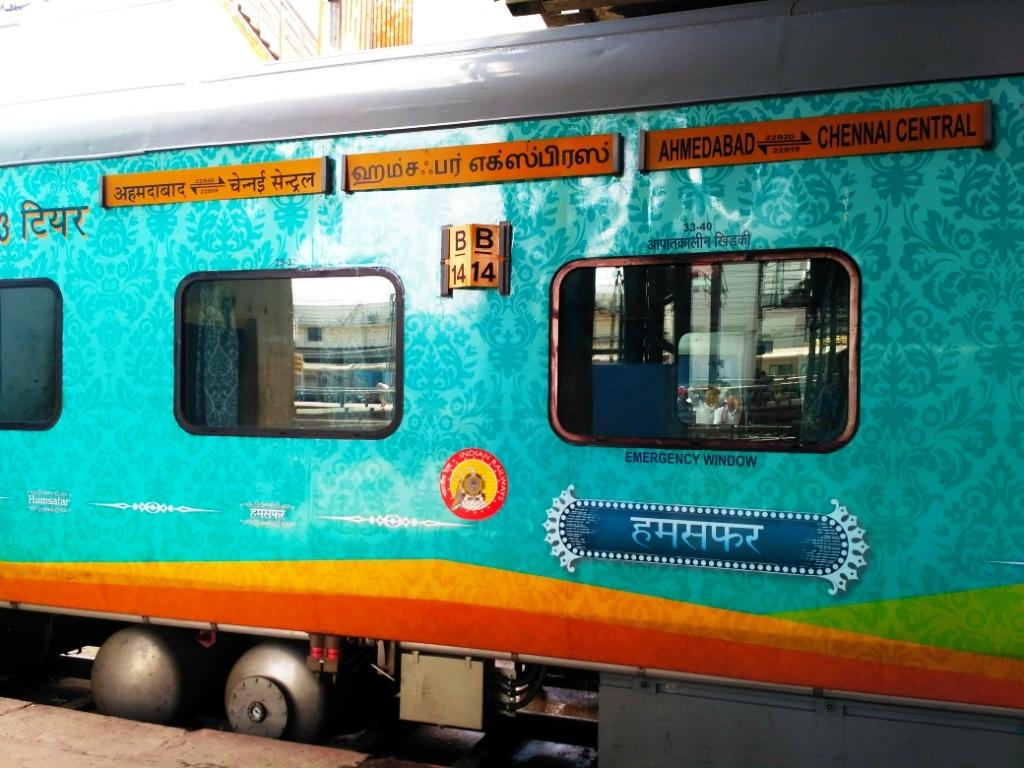
- An AC-3 Tier coach of Chennai Central-Ahmedabad Humsafar Express at Ahmedabad Junction

Overview
- Service type: Humsafar Express
- Status: Operational
- Locale: Tamil Nadu, Andhra Pradesh, Karnataka, Maharashtra and Gujarat
- First service: 8 May 2017; 8 years ago
- Current operator(s): Western Railway zone of Indian Railways

Route
- Termini: Chennai Central (MAS); Ahmedabad Junction (ADI)
- Stops: 12
- Distance travelled: 1,727 km (1,073 mi)
- Average journey time: 29 hours, 30 min
- Service frequency: Weekly (Note: Runs once in a week for every direction.)
- Train number(s): 22919 / 22920
- Line(s) used: Mumbai–Chennai line; Ahmedabad–Mumbai main line

On-board services
- Class(es): AC 3 Tier, Sleeper class
- Disabled access: Disabled access
- Sleeping arrangements: Couchette car (Bedroll and Linen is provided in AC 3 Tier)
- Catering facilities: On-board catering available
- Observation facilities: Large windows in all carriages
- Baggage facilities: Underseat
- Other facilities: Smoke alarms; CCTV cameras; Baby changing table; Odour-control system; Passenger information system

Technical
- Rolling stock: LHB coach
- Track gauge: 5 ft 6 in (1,676 mm) broad gauge
- Operating speed: 130 km/h (81 mph) (top operating speed); 59 km/h (37 mph) (average including halts)

Chennai Central–Ahmedabad Humsafar Express, also known as Ahmedabad Humsafar Express, is a 18 Coached partially air-conditioned version of Humsafar-type service running between Chennai Central and Ahmedabad Junction. It is one of the fastest train to connect Gujarat to Tamil Nadu, doing so in less than thirty hours. It is maintained by the Ahmedabad division of Western Railway (WR). In the up direction, from Ahmedabad to Chennai, the service runs with train number 22920 and in down direction, from Chennai to Ahmedabad, as train number 22919.

The maiden run of the train was on 8 May 2017. It ran as Ahmedabad–Chennai Central Humsafar inaugural special express for the very first time and was flagged off by the then Railway Minister, Suresh Prabhu.

Train no. 22920 leaves Ahmedabad Junction at 09:40 every Monday and arrives Chennai Central at 15:25 the next Tuesday. The return train 22919 leaves Chennai Central at 16:00 every Wednesday and arrives Ahmedabad Junction at 21:15 the next Thursday. Chennai-Ahmedabad Humsafar Express runs with an average speed of 59 km/h.

== Locomotive ==
It is hauled by a Vadodara loco shed-based WAP-7 loco end to end.

== Coach composition ==
Pure LHB coach in red-grey Rajdhani livery, manufactured in India, are used for this train. Humsafar vinyl or wallpaper pasting is done on the AC-3 Tier coaches to give the humsafar livery. The service was launched with fifteen AC-3 Tier and one Pantry Car. The AC-3 tier coaches were designed by Indian Railways with LED screen display to show information about stations, train speed etc. It is planned to have announcement system, vending machines for tea, coffee and milk, and bio toilets in compartments as well as CCTV cameras.

The service consists of 10 Third AC (3A), 6 Sleeper Class (SL), 1 Seating cum Luggage Rake and 1 Generator car luggage car guard van, hence, a total of 18 coaches. As is customary with most train services in India, the coach composition may be amended at the discretion of Indian Railways depending on demand. Maximum 1–2 extra coaches may be added to clear extra rush during holidays. In September 2019, sleeper coaches were added to the train.

	Loco	1	2	3	4	5	6	7	8	9	10	11	12	13	14	15	16	17	18
22919	|	EOG	S1	S2	S3	S4	S5	S6	B10	B9	B8	B7	B6	B5	B4	B3	B2	B1	SLR
22920		SLR	B1	B2	B3	B4	B5	B6	B7	B8	B9	B10	S6	S5	S4	S3	S2	S1	EOG

== Route and halts ==
The schedule of Chennai Central – Ahmedabad Humsafar Express is given below:-

MAS - ADI Humsafar Express
22919		Stations	22920	
Arrival	Departure	Stations	Arrival	Departure
-NIL-	16:00	Chennai Central	15:25	-NIL-
18:30	18:35	Renigunta Junction	12:15	12:20
23:25	23:30	Guntakal Junction	07:00	07:10
01:18	01:20	Raichur	04:43	04:45
03:57	04:00	Kalaburagi	06:35	06:40
06:35	06:40	Solapur Junction	00:15	00:20
10:55	11:05	Pune Junction	20:10	20:15
13:22	13:25	Kalyan Junction	16:52	16:55
14:20	14:25	Vasai Road	15:52	15:57
14:54	14:56	Palghar	15:15	15:17
16:52	16:55	Surat	13:07	13:12
18:33	18:38	Vadodara Junction	11:10	11:15
19:10	19:12	Anand Junction	10:34	10:36
21:15	-NIL-	Ahmedabad Junction	-NIL-	09:40

== See also ==
- Navjeevan Express
- Humsafar Express
- Central Railways' Press Release
