= Gothangam railway station =

Railway Station in Gujarat, India

General information
- Location: Gothangam, Surat district, Gujarat; India
- Coordinates: 21°17′27″N 72°52′45″E
- System: Indian Railway Station
- Owner: Ministry of Railways, Indian Railways
- Operator: Western Railway
- Lines: New Delhi–Mumbai main line Ahmedabad–Mumbai main line
- Platforms: 3
- Tracks: 3

Construction
- Structure type: Standard (On Ground)
- Parking: No

Other information
- Status: Functioning
- Station code: GTX
- Zone(s): Western Railway
- Division(s): Vadodara
Location
- Location within India Location within Gujarat

Gothangam railway station is a small railway station on the Western Railway network in the state of Gujarat, India. It serves Gothangam village. Gothangam railway station is 10 km from Surat. Passenger and MEMU trains halt here.
