= Valsad–Vadodara Passenger =

Train in India

Valsad-Vadodara Passenger
Overview
- Service type: Passenger
- Locale: Gujarat
- Current operator: Western Railway

Route
- Termini: Valsad (BL); Vadodara (BRC)
- Stops: 33
- Distance travelled: 199 km (124 mi)
- Average journey time: 6 hrs 15 mins
- Service frequency: Daily
- Train number: 59049 / 59050

On-board services
- Class: General Unreserved
- Seating arrangements: Yes
- Sleeping arrangements: No
- Auto-rack arrangements: Overhead racks
- Catering facilities: No
- Observation facilities: Large windows
- Baggage facilities: No
- Other facilities: Below the seats

Technical
- Rolling stock: ICF coach
- Track gauge: 1,676 mm (5 ft 6 in)
- Operating speed: 27 km/h (17 mph)

The 59049 / 59050 Valsad-Vadodara Passenger is a passenger train of the Indian Railways connecting Valsad in Gujarat and Vadodara Junction of Gujarat. It is currently being operated with 59049/59050 train numbers on a daily basis.

== Coach composition ==
The train consists of 22 coaches:

- 19 General Unreserved(GEN)
- 2 Seating cum Luggage Rake(SLR)
- 1 First-class Coach(FC)

== Service ==
The 59049/Valsad - Vadodara Passenger has average speed of 26 km/h and covers 199 km in 6 hrs 5 mins.

The 59050/Vadodara - Valsad Passenger has average speed of 28 km/h and covers 199 km in 6 hrs 25 mins. It has punctuality ratio around 50-60%.

== Route and halts ==
The 59049/50 Valsad - Vadodara Passenger runs from Valsad via Navsari, Surat, Bharuch Junction and vice versa.

== Traction ==
Both trains are hauled by a Vadodara Loco Shed based WAP-5 or Valsad Loco Shed based WAP-4E electric locomotives from Valsad to Vadodara and vice versa.
