= Karambeli railway station =

Railway station in Gujarat

General information
- Location: Karambeli, Valsad district, Gujarat; India
- Coordinates: 20°18′59″N 72°54′05″E
- System: Indian Railways station
- Owner: Ministry of Railways, Indian Railways
- Operator: Western Railway
- Lines: New Delhi–Mumbai main line Ahmedabad–Mumbai main line
- Platforms: 2
- Tracks: 2

Construction
- Structure type: Ground
- Parking: No

Other information
- Status: Functioning
- Station code: KEB
- Zone(s): Western Railway
- Division(s): Mumbai WR

Services
Preceding station	Indian Railways	Following station
Vapi towards ?	New Delhi–Mumbai main line	Bhilad towards ?
Location
- Location within India Location within Gujarat

Karambeli railway station is a small railway station on the Western Railway network in the state of Gujarat, India. Karambeli railway station is 7 km away from Vapi railway station. Passenger and MEMU trains halt here.

== See also ==
- Valsad district
