= Umargam Road railway station =

Railway station in Gujarat, India

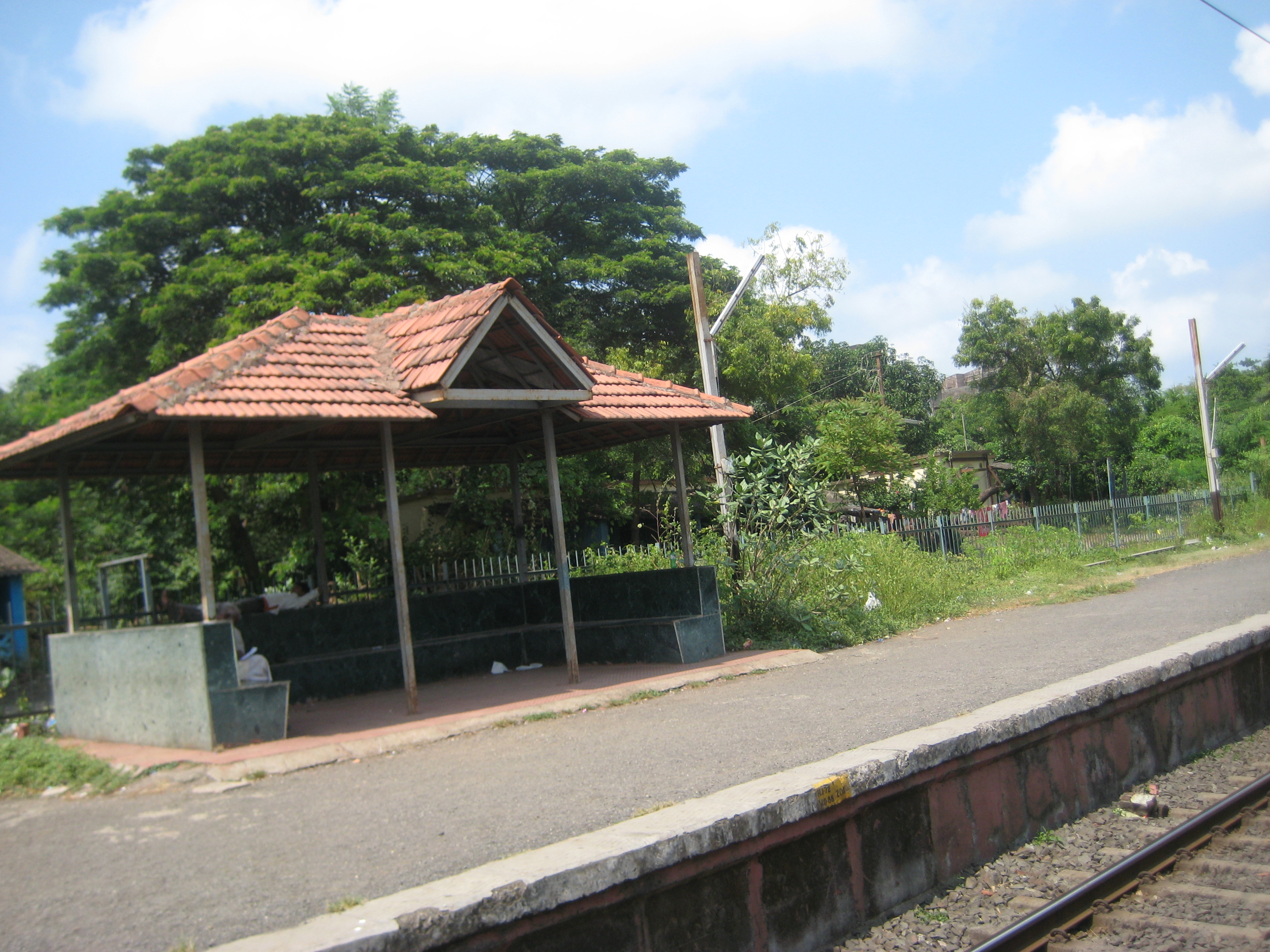
- Rest Area, Platform No-1, Umargam Station

General information
- Location: Station Road, Umargam, Valsad, Gujarat; India
- Coordinates: 20°09′13″N 72°47′26″E
- Elevation: 24 metres (79 ft)
- System: Indian Railways station
- Owner: Indian Railways
- Operator: Western Railway
- Lines: New Delhi–Mumbai main line Ahmedabad–Mumbai main line
- Platforms: 3
- Tracks: 4

Construction
- Structure type: Standard (on ground)
- Parking: Yes
- Cycle facilities: No

Other information
- Status: Functioning
- Station code: UBR
- Zone(s): Western Railway
- Division(s): Mumbai WR

Services
| Preceding station | Indian Railways | Following station |
|---|---|---|
| Sanjan towards ? | New Delhi–Mumbai main line | Bordi Road towards ? |
Location
- Location within India Location within Gujarat

Umargam Road railway station is a medium railway station in Valsad district, Gujarat, India in Mumbai Division of Western Railway. It is owned and operated by Indian Railways and is in the Western Railway zone. Its station code is UBR. It serves Umargam and nearby towns. The station consists of three platforms, has shelter roofs on the platforms and Pay & Use toilets.

== Major trains ==
Following trains halt at Umargam Road railway station in both directions:

- 69153/54 Umargam Road–Valsad MEMU
- 12921/22 Flying_Ranee
- 12935/36 Bandra_Terminus–Surat_Intercity_Express
- 22929/30 Dahanu Road–Vadodara Superfast Express
- 59023/24 Mumbai Central–Valsad Fast Passenger
- 19015/16 Saurashtra Express
- 22953/54 Gujarat Superfast Express
- 22927/28 Lok Shakti Express
