= Umargam Road–Valsad MEMU =

Indian train route

Umargam Road – Valsad MEMU
Overview
- Service type: MEMU
- Current operator(s): Western Railway zone

Route
- Termini: Umargam Road (UBR); Valsad (BL)
- Stops: 7
- Distance travelled: 54 km (34 mi)
- Average journey time: 1 hrs 20 mins
- Service frequency: Daily
- Train number(s): 69153/69154

On-board services
- Class(es): Unreserved
- Seating arrangements: Yes
- Sleeping arrangements: No
- Catering facilities: No
- Entertainment facilities: No

Technical
- Rolling stock: 2
- Track gauge: 1,676 mm (5 ft 6 in)
- Operating speed: 41 km/h (25 mph)

The 69153/69154 Umargam Road–Valsad MEMU is a MEMU train of the Indian Railways connecting Umargam Road and Valsad of Gujarat. It is currently being operated with 69153/69154 train numbers on a daily basis.

== Service ==
- 69153/Umargam Road–Valsad MEMU has average speed of 38 km/h and covers 54 km in 1 hrs 25 min.
- 69154/Valsad–Umargam Road MEMU has average speed of 44 km/h and covers 54 km in 1 hrs 15 min.

== Route ==
The 69153/54 Umargam Road–Valsad MEMU runs from Umargam Road via Bhilad, Vapi, Udvada, Pardi to Valsad, and vice versa.

== Coach composition ==
The train consists of 20 MEMU rake coaches.

== Rake sharing ==
The train shares its rake with 69151/69152 Valsad–Surat MEMU and 69111/69112 Surat–Vadodara MEMU.
