= Niyol railway station =

Railway station in Gujarat, India

General information
- Location: Niyol, Surat district India
- Coordinates: 21°09′37″N 72°54′12″E
- Elevation: 21 metres (69 ft)
- System: Indian Railways station
- Owner: Ministry of Railways, Indian Railways
- Operator: Western Railway
- Line: Udhna–Jalgaon line
- Platforms: 2
- Tracks: 2

Construction
- Structure type: Standard (on ground station)
- Parking: No

Other information
- Status: Closed
- Station code: NOL
- Zone(s): Western Railway
- Division(s): Mumbai WR
Location
- Location within India Location within Gujarat

Niyol railway station is a railway station in Surat district of Gujarat state of India. It is under Mumbai WR of Western Railway zone of Indian Railways. Niyol railway station is 11 km far away from Surat. The station consists of 2 platforms. It is located on Udhna–Jalgaon line of the Indian Railways.

It is located at 21 m above sea level and has two platforms. As of 2016, electrified double broad-gauge railway line exists at this station.

== See also ==
- Surat district
