= Sanjan railway station =

Railway station in Gujarat, India

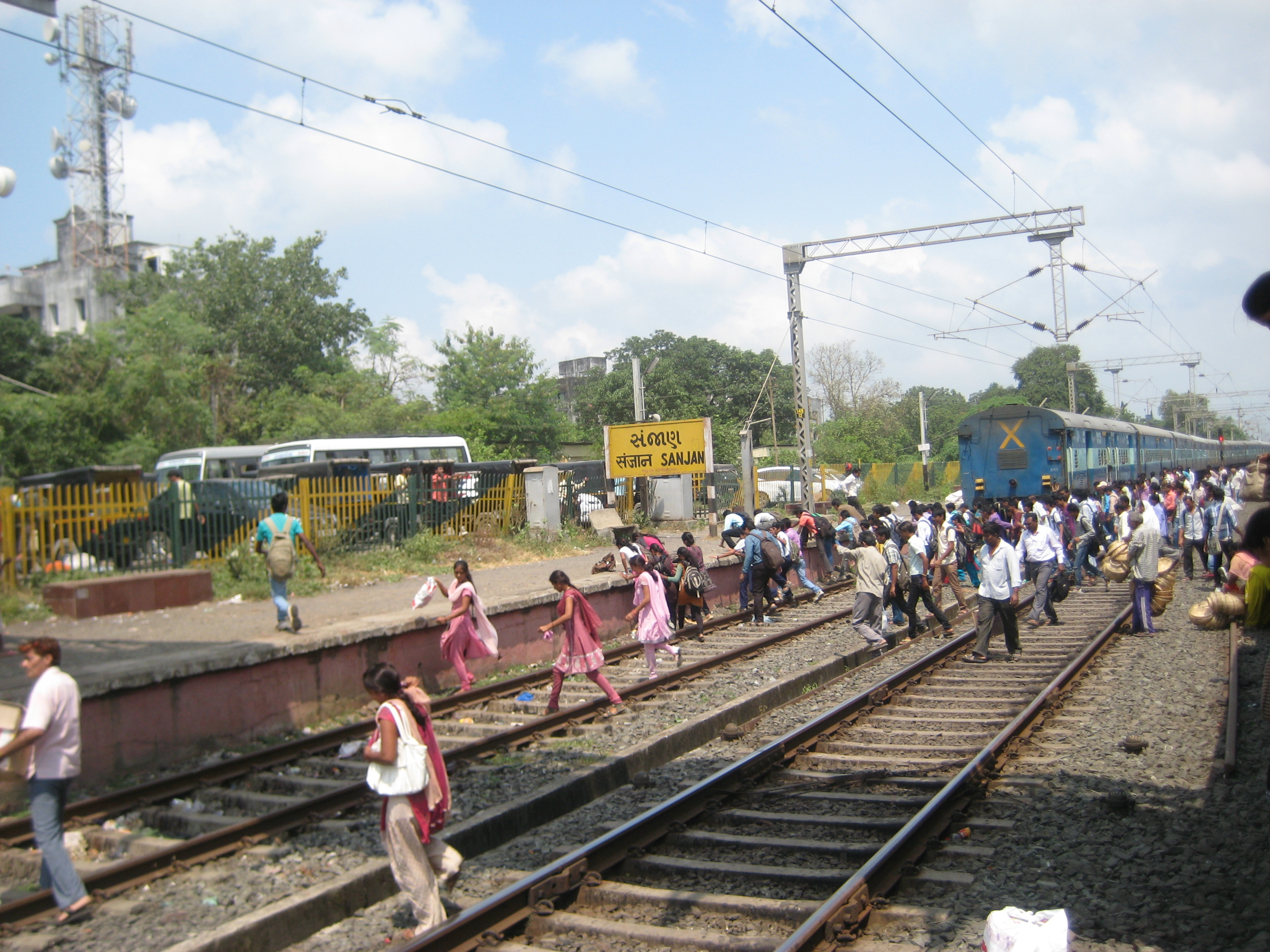

General information
- Location: Sanjan, Gujarat; India
- Coordinates: 20°11′32″N 72°49′17″E
- Elevation: 21 metres (69 ft)
- System: Indian Railways station
- Owner: Ministry of Railways
- Operator: Western Railway
- Lines: New Delhi–Mumbai main line Ahmedabad–Mumbai main line
- Platforms: 3
- Tracks: 4

Construction
- Structure type: Standard (on ground)
- Parking: No

Other information
- Status: Functioning
- Station code: SJN
- Zone(s): Western Railway
- Division(s): Mumbai WR

Services
Preceding station	Indian Railways	Following station
Bhilad towards ?	New Delhi–Mumbai main line	Umargam Road towards ?
Location
- Location within India Location within Gujarat

Sanjan railway station is a railway station on the Western Railway in the state of Gujarat, India. Sanjan railway station is 49 km away from Valsad railway station. Passenger, MEMU and few Express trains halt at Sanjan railway station.

On occasion of Parsi festival, Western railway gives stoppage of Gujarat Superfast Express and Flying Ranee trains at Sanjan every year.
