= Bhestan railway station =

Railway station in Gujarat, India

General information
- Location: Bhestan, Surat district, Gujarat; India
- Coordinates: 21°07′21″N 72°51′48″E
- Elevation: 13 metres (43 ft)
- System: Indian Railways station
- Owner: Ministry of Railways, Indian Railways
- Operator: Western Railway
- Lines: New Delhi–Mumbai main line Ahmedabad–Mumbai main line
- Platforms: 2
- Tracks: 4

Construction
- Structure type: Ground
- Parking: Yes

Other information
- Status: Functioning
- Station code: BHET
- Zone(s): Western Railway
- Division(s): Mumbai WR

Services
Preceding station	Indian Railways	Following station
Udhna Junction towards ?	New Delhi–Mumbai main line	Sachin towards ?
Location
- Location within India Location within Gujarat

Bhestan railway station is a small railway station on the Western Railway network in the state of Gujarat, India. Bhestan railway station is 10 km away from Surat railway station. Passenger, MEMU, and Express trains halt here.

== Trains ==
- 19003/04 Bandra Terminus–Bhusaval Khandesh Express
- 09051/52 Mumbai Bhusawal TOD Spl
- 15068/67 Bandra T. - Gorakhpur Express
- 19425/26 Borivali - Nandurabar Passenger
- 09161/62 Valsad - Vadodara Jn
- 19101/02 Virar - Bharuch Memo
- 09087/88 Sanjan - Surat Memo
- 09151/52 Valsad - Surat Memo
- 09180. Surat - Virar Memo
- 22913/14 Bandra - Saharsa Humsafar Express
- 19417/18 Borivali - Ahmedabad Passenger
- 12943/44 Valsad - Kanpur Udhyog karmi Express
- 19051/52 Valsad - Muzaffarpur Shramik Express

== See also ==
- Surat district
