= Palghar railway station =

Railway Station in Maharashtra, India

Palghar

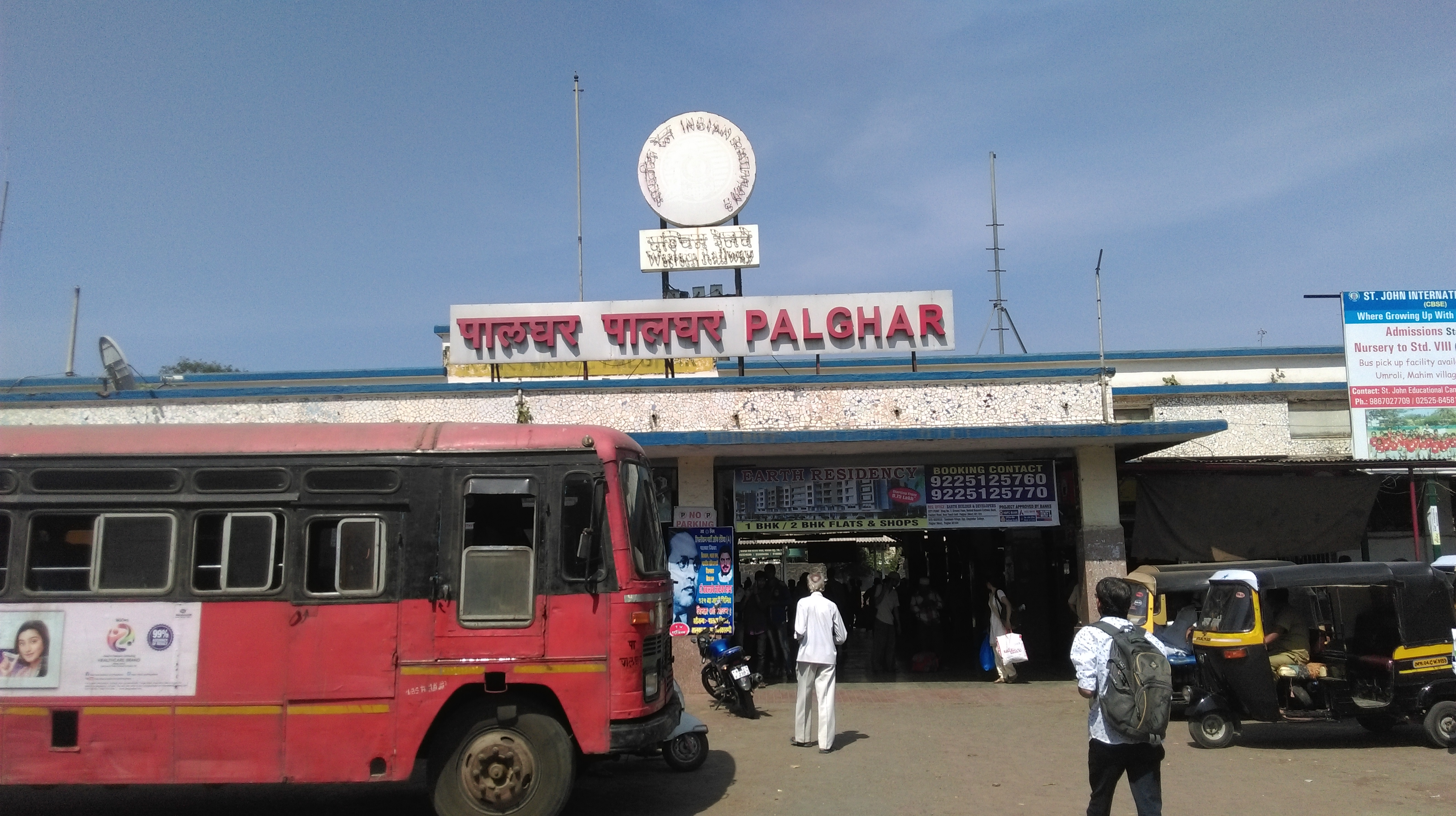

General information
- Location: Mahim Road, Palghar, Maharashtra
- Coordinates: 19.7°N 72.77°E
- Elevation: 15.490 metres (50.82 ft)
- System: Mumbai Suburban Railway station
- Owner: Ministry of Railways, Indian Railways
- Lines: Western Line; Ahmedabad–Mumbai main line
- Platforms: 3
- Tracks: 5

Construction
- Structure type: Standard on-ground station
- Parking: Yes
- Cycle facilities: Yes

Other information
- Status: Active
- Station code: PLG
- Fare zone: Western Railways

Services
Preceding station	Mumbai Suburban Railway	Following station
Kelve Road towards Churchgate	Western line	Umroli towards Dahanu Road
Route map
Location
- Location within India Location within Maharashtra

Palghar railway station (station code: PLG) is a railway station on the Western Railway line of Mumbai Suburban Railway.

Palghar is the headquarters of the Palghar district in India's Maharashtra state, which comes under the Mumbai metropolitan region. Palghar is well served with EMU (Mumbai Locals) and MEMU trains, which provide direct connectivity to various parts of Mumbai, Thane and Panvel. Many long-distance trains also stop at Palghar.

== History ==
An 1864 timetable of the BB&CIR's first passenger train service between Grant Rd and Ahmedabad advertised in the Bombay Gazette mentions the station as 'Palghur'. A table of elevation of the stations and major bridges along the line published in the Magazine, Bombay Builder of 5 April 1867 further mentions a station named 'Palghur Station' on the line. However, one source suggests that Palghar railway station was opened in the year 1893. This might suggest that a small or temporary station must have been constructed earlier, later replaced by a proper station.

The presence of the station, and due to the plague epidemic of the 1890s, caused the rich from the nearby Mahim-Kelwa village, to settle in the village, aiding in the locality's growth.

The double line from Virar to Palghar opened on 1 December 1897, while that from Palghar to Dahanu Rd was opened on 17 January 1898.

== Major trains ==
The following trains stop at Palghar railway station:

- Bandra Terminus–Dehradun Express
- Bandra Terminus–Bhusaval Khandesh Express
- Bandra Terminus–Ahmedabad Lok Shakti Superfast Express
- Mumbai Central–Okha Saurashtra Mail
- Mumbai Central–Ahmedabad Gujarat Mail
- Mumbai Central–Firozpur Janata Express
- Bikaner–Bandra Terminus Ranakpur Express
- Mumbai Central–Surat Flying Ranee Superfast Express
- Bandra –Surat Intercity Express
- Kochuveli–Porbandar Express
- Kochuveli–Dehradun Superfast Express
- Saurashtra Express
- Gujarat Superfast Express
- Jaipur–Bandra Terminus Superfast Express
- Ajmer–Bandra Terminus Express
- Indore–Pune Express (via Panvel)
- Chennai–Ahmedabad Humsafar Express
- Shri Ganganagar–Dadar Superfast Express
- Swaraj Express
- Mysore–Ajmer Express
- Bhagat Ki Kothi–Dadar Superfast Express
- Ajmer–Bandra Terminus Express

== Gallery ==
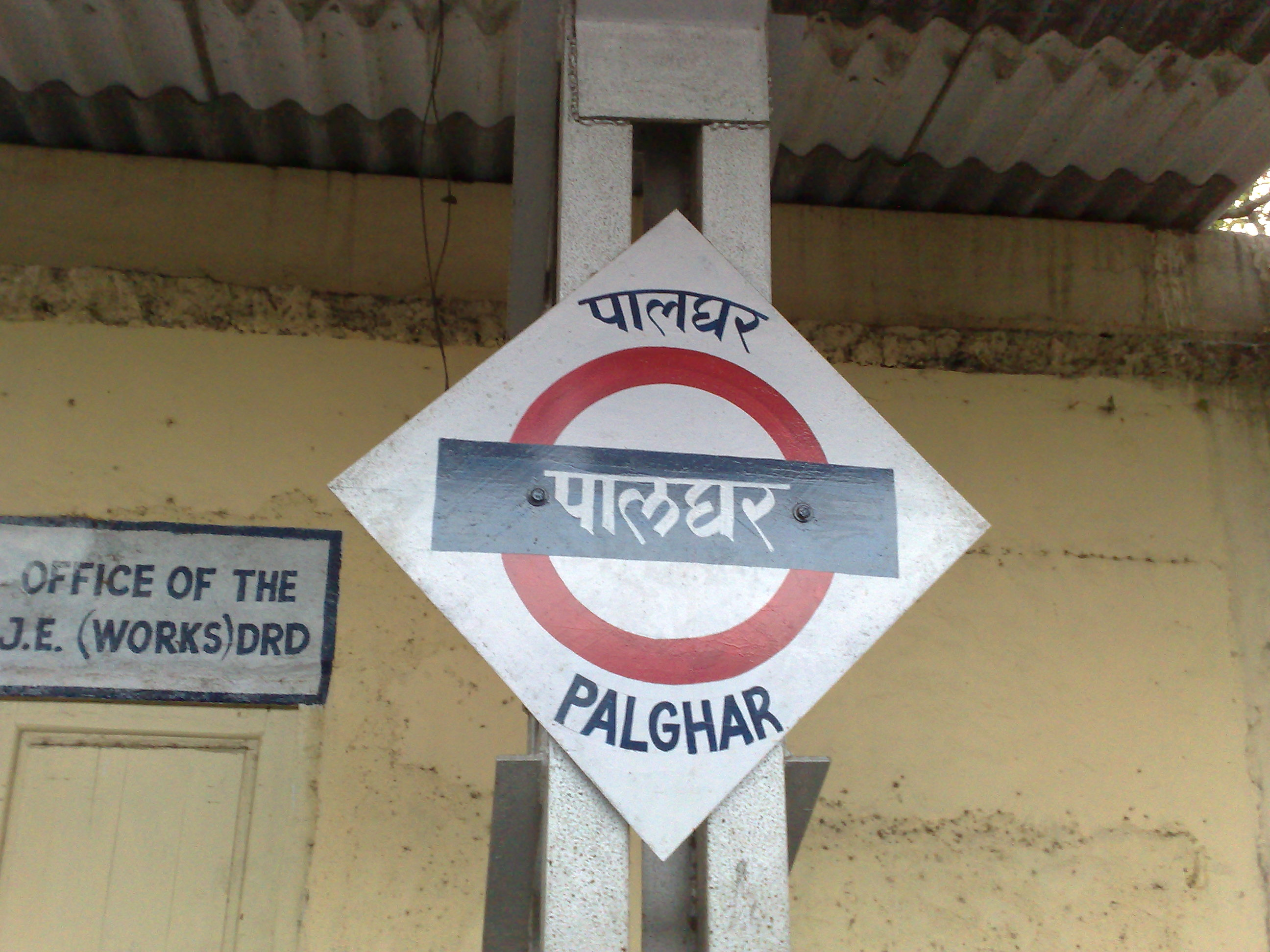
Palghar railway station – Platformboard

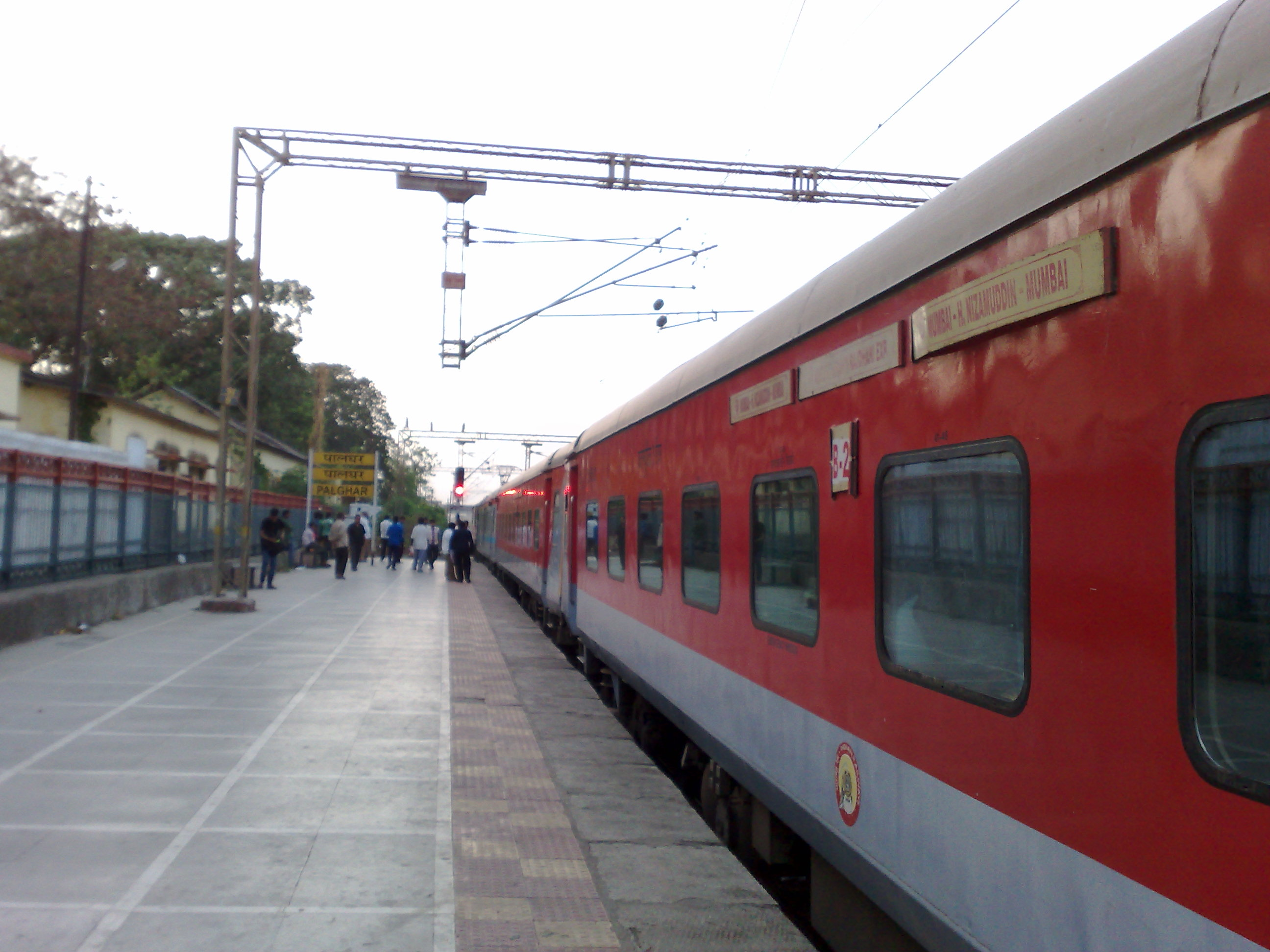
12953 August Kranti Rajdhani Express at Palghar

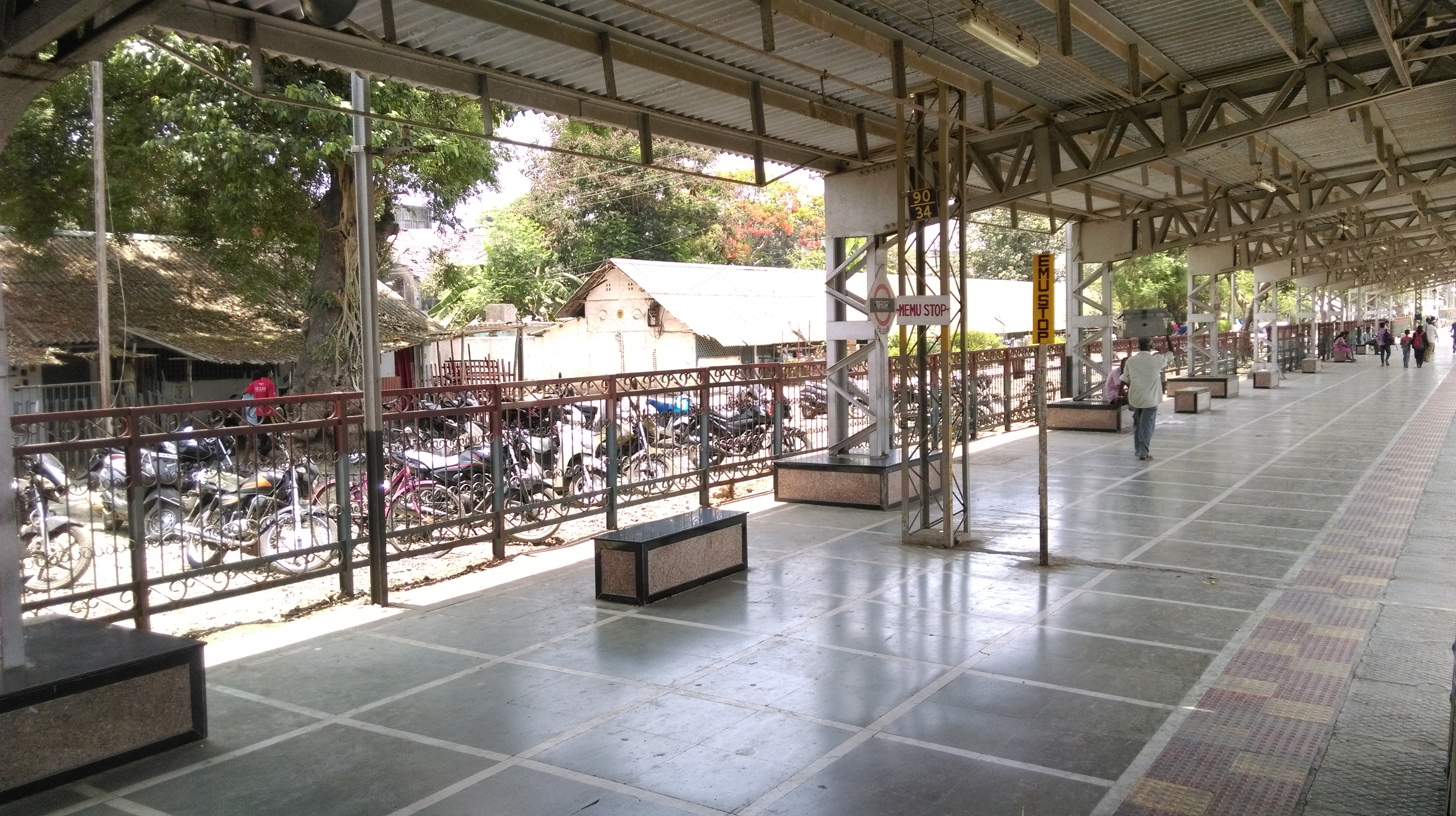
Palghar railway station – EMU halt

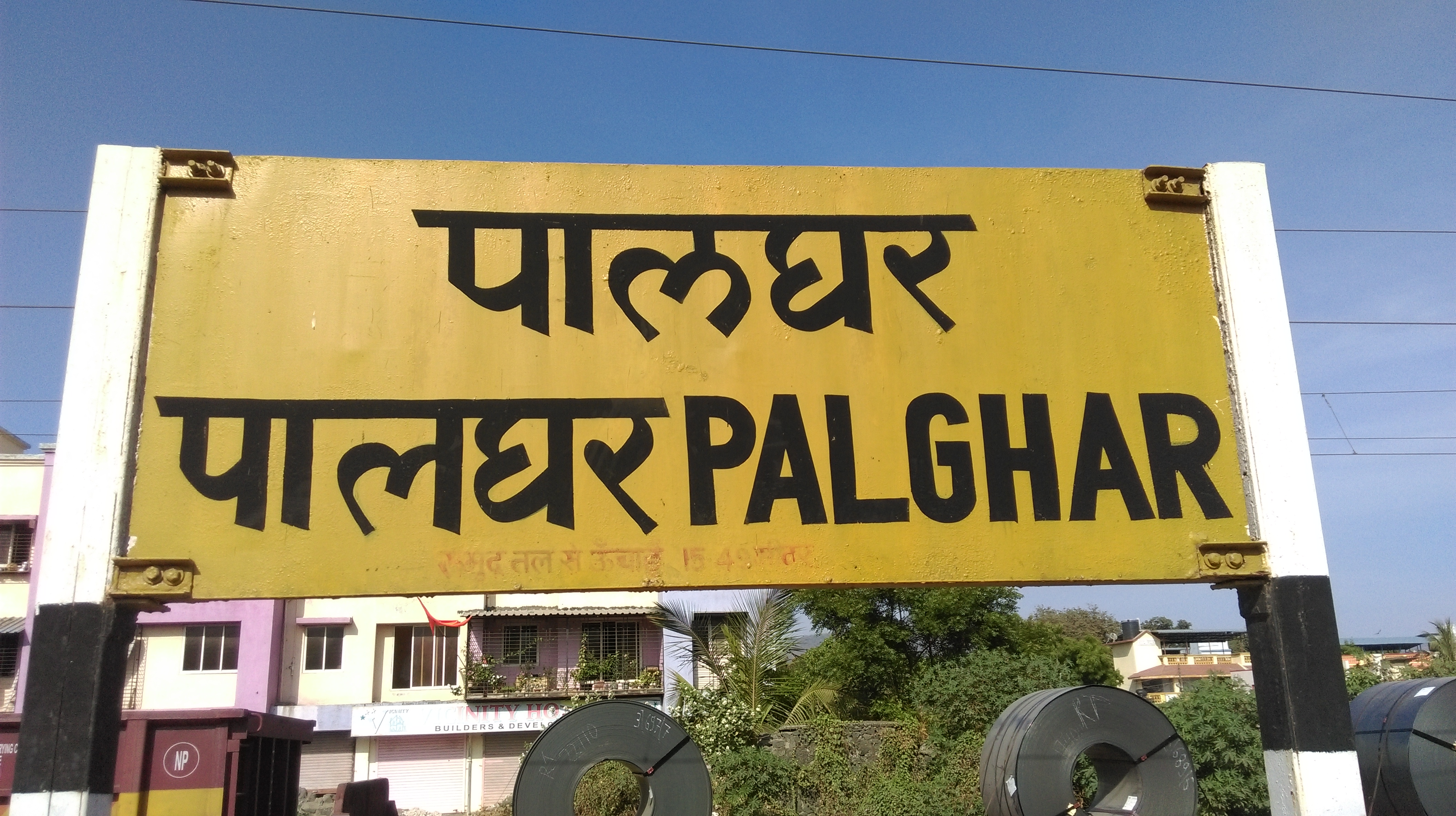
Palghar railway station – Station board

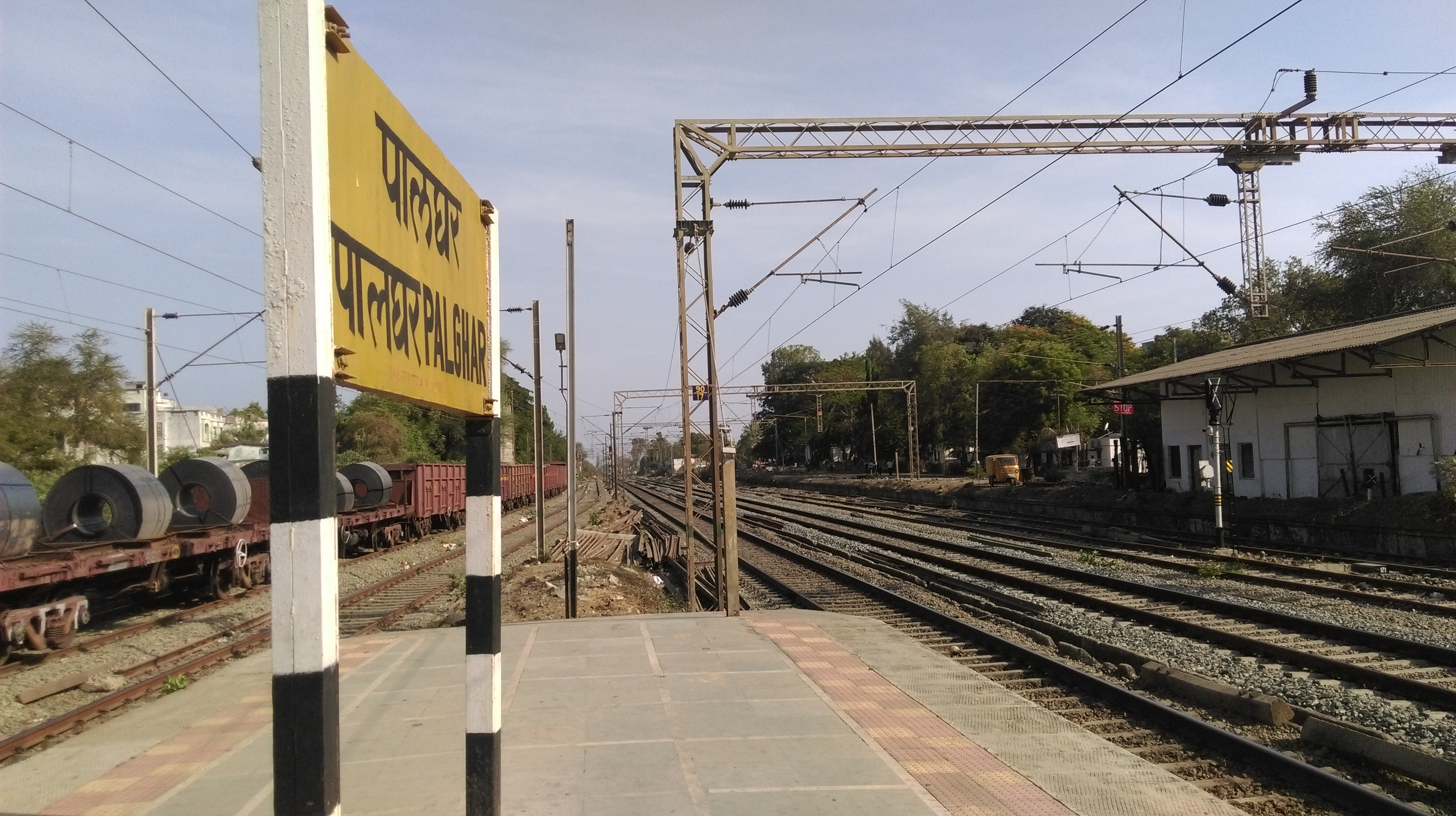
Palghar railway station – South view from station

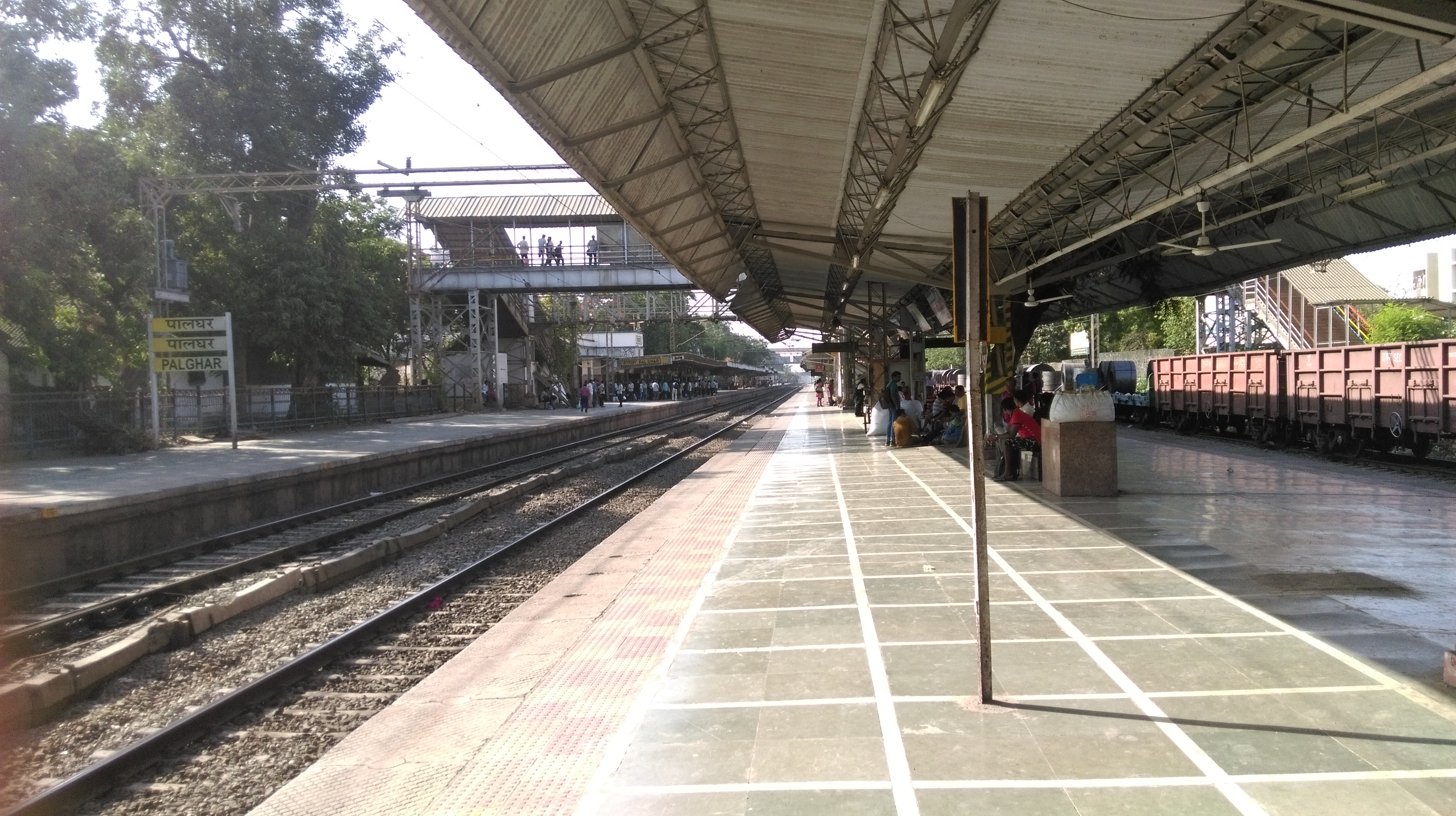
Palghar railway station – North view from station

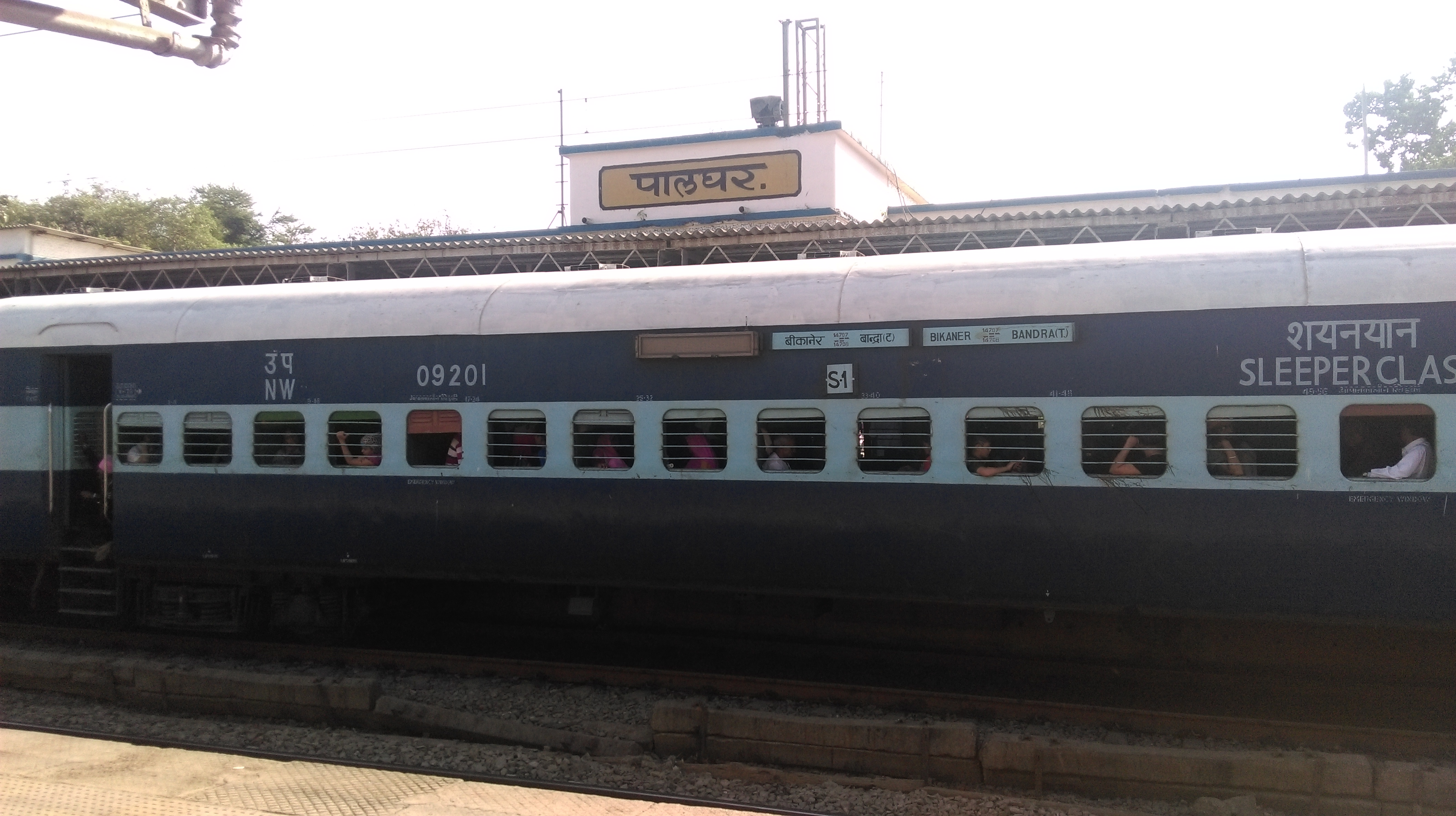
14708 Ranakpur Express at Palghar
