= Bhilad railway station =

Railway station in Gujarat

General information
- Location: State Highway 5, Bhilad, Valsad district, Gujarat; India
- Coordinates: 20°16′30″N 72°53′15″E
- Elevation: 34 metres (112 ft)
- System: Indian Railways station
- Owner: Indian Railways
- Operator: Western Railway
- Lines: New Delhi–Mumbai main line Ahmedabad–Mumbai main line
- Platforms: 3
- Tracks: 3

Construction
- Structure type: Standard (on-ground station)
- Parking: Yes
- Cycle facilities: Yes

Other information
- Status: Double electric line
- Station code: BLD
- Zone(s): Western Railway
- Division(s): Mumbai WR

Services
Preceding station	Indian Railways	Following station
Karambeli towards ?	New Delhi–Mumbai main line	Sanjan towards ?
Location
- Location within India Location within Gujarat

Bhilad railway station is a small railway station in Valsad district, Gujarat, India. Its code is BLD. It serves Bhilad town. The station consists of three platforms. The platform is partly sheltered. It lacks sanitation facilities but water and snacks are available. Disembark here for Sarigam GIDC and Silvassa town. Passenger, MEMU, Express and Superfast trains halt here.

== Major trains ==
- 22929/30 Bhilad–Vadodara Superfast Express
- 19215/16 Saurashtra Express
- 22953/54 Gujarat Superfast Express
- 19023/24 Firozpur Janata Express
