= Surat Bus Rapid Transit System =

Public transit system in Gujarat, India

Surat BRTS

Overview
- Locale: Surat, India
- Transit type: Bus rapid transit
- Number of lines: 15 (Phase I & II)
- Number of stations: 148
- Daily ridership: 125000
- Website: http://my.sitilink.in/

Operation
- Began operation: November 2013 (Phase I)
- Operator: Surat Municipal Corporation

Technical
- System length: 114 kilometres (71 mi) (Phase I & II)

The Surat BRTS Or Sitilink is an integrated bus rapid transit and public bus transport system for Surat, Gujarat, India. It has been operational since 26 January 2014 by Surat Municipal Corporation.

== Corridors ==
=== Phase 1 ===
Two corridors of Surat BRTS have been completed in Phase 1.

- Corridor 1: Udhana Darwaja to Sachin GIDC Naka [10.20 km (6.34 mi)]
- Corridor 2: ONGC Colony – Canal Road – Sarthana Jakat Naka [19.70 km (12.24 mi)]

=== Phase 2 ===
Phase 2 consists of nine corridors, out of which most of the corridors have already been completed.

- Corridor 3: Adajan Patiya to Jahangirpura
- Corridor 4: Adajan Patiya to Pal R.T.O.
- Corridor 5: Pal R.T.O. to ONGC Colony
- Corridor 6: Anuvrat Dwar to St. Thomas School Junction
- Corridor 7: St. Thomas School Junction to Daksheshwar Mahadev Junction (Connect to Phase-I)
- Corridor 8: Dindoli Varigruh to Hirabaug/Gajera Circle
- Corridor 9: Hirabaug to Lake Garden
- Corridor 10: Gajera Circle to Jahangirpura
- Corridor 11: Katargam Darwaja to Kosad

== Routes ==
Transit routes
Route No.	Route
01	Adajan G.S.R.T.C. → Adajan G.S.R.T.C. (Clockwise)
02	Adajan G.S.R.T.C. → Adajan G.S.R.T.C. (Anti-Clockwise)
11	Udhana Darwaja ↔ Sachin GIDC Naka
12	Sarthana Nature Park ↔ ONGC Colony
13	Jahangirpura Community Hall ↔ Kadodara
14	ONGC Colony ↔ Kosad EWS H2
15AA	Althan Depot Terminal → Amazia Amusement Park → Althan Depot Terminal (Anti-Clockwise)
15CC	Althan Depot Terminal → Amazia Amusement Park → Althan Depot Terminal (Clockwise)
16	Kosad depot ↔ li Varigruh
17E	Kamrej ↔ Sachin GIDC Naka
17	Kamrej ↔ Pal R.T.O.
18	Railway Station ↔ Utran ROB Bridge
19	Railway Station ↔ Kadodara
20	Kosad EWS H2 ↔ Kharwarnagar
21	Jahangirpura ↔ Althan Depot Terminal
22	Sarthana Nature Park ↔ Kosad EWS H2
102	Railway Station ↔ Moti Ved(Katargam)
103	Railway Station ↔ Mota Varachha
104	Railway Station ↔ Vrukshlaxmi Society
105	Railway Station ↔ Chiku Wadi (Pandesara)
106	Railway Station ↔ Abhva Gam
107	Railway Station ↔ Vivekanand College (Jahangirpura)
109	Railway Station ↔ Kadodara
112	Railway Station ↔ Kosad Gam
116A	Railway Station ↔ Khajod Gam (Via SIECC Road)
116B	Railway Station ↔ Khajod Gam (Via Bhimrad Canal Road)
117	Railway Station ↔ Palanpur Gam
118	Railway Station ↔ Sayan
126	Railway Station ↔ V.N.S.G.U.
127	Railway Station ↔ Rander Gam
136	Railway Station ↔ Airport
137	Railway Station ↔ Variav Gam
153	Gopi Talav ↔ Kapodara
202	Chowk ↔ Laxmidham Society
204	Chowk ↔ Godadara
205	Chowk ↔ Unn/Kanakpur/Gabheni Gam
206	Chowk ↔ Dumas (via C.k. pithawala college)
207	Chowk ↔ Vaishnodevi Township
209	Chowk ↔ Vrukshlaxmi Society
212	Chowk ↔ Kosad Gam
216	Chowk ↔ Dumas
217	Makkai Pool ↔ SGM College, Bhesan
226	Kosad Gam ↔ V.N.S.G.U.
254	Katargam ↔ Godadara
305	Unn Industrial Estate ↔ Kharwarnagar
315	Bhestan Garder ↔ Kharwarnagar
402	Puna Canal ↔ Pandit Shyamji Krishna Verma Bridge
403	Amazia Amusement Park ↔ Sarthana Nature Park
410	Mota Varachha → Mini bazaar (Clockwise)
410	Mini bazaar → Mota Varachha (Anti-Clockwise)
504	Amazia Amusement Park ↔ Bhestan Garden
506	Sunrise Vidyalaya ↔ Vesu Gaam
658	Adajan G.S.R.T.C. ↔ Mora Char Rasta
706	V. N. S. G. U. ↔ Jahangirpura
716	Jahangirpura ↔ Vesu VIP Rd Gail Colony

== See also ==
- Surat Diamond Bourse
- List of tourist attractions in Surat
- Surat Railway Station
- Surat International Airport
- Surat Metro
- Surat high-speed railway station
- Surat Metropolitan Region
- List of colleges in Surat
