= Maroli railway station =

Railway station in Gujarat, India

General information
- Location: Maroli, Gujarat; India
- Coordinates: 21°01′14″N 72°53′25″E
- Elevation: 15 metres (49 ft)
- System: Indian Railways station
- Owner: Ministry of Railways, Indian Railways
- Operator: Western Railway
- Lines: New Delhi–Mumbai main line Ahmedabad–Mumbai main line
- Platforms: 3
- Tracks: 3

Construction
- Structure type: Standard (On Ground)
- Parking: No

Other information
- Status: Functioning
- Station code: MRL
- Zone(s): Western Railway
- Division(s): Mumbai WR

Services
Preceding station	Indian Railways	Following station
Sachin towards ?	New Delhi–Mumbai main line	Navsari towards ?
Location
- Location within India Location within Gujarat

Maroli railway station is a railway station on the Western Railway network in the state of Gujarat, India. It is 8 kilometers from the Navsari railway station. Passenger, MEMU and few Express/Superfast trains halt at Maroli railway station.

== Major trains ==
Following Express & Superfast trains halt at Maroli railway station in both direction:

- 19033/34 Valsad–Ahmedabad Gujarat Queen Express
- 12929/30 Valsad–Dahod Intercity Superfast Express
- 19023/24 Mumbai Central–Firozpur Janata Express
- 19215/16 Mumbai Central–Porbandar Saurashtra Express
- 12921/22 Mumbai Central–Surat Flying Ranee Superfast Express

== See also ==
- Navsari district
