= Flying Ranee =

Train service in India

Overview
- Service type: Superfast, Double Decker Express (old)
- Locale: Maharashtra, Gujarat
- First service: 17 April 1937
- Current operator: Western Railways

Route
- Termini: Mumbai Central (MMCT); Surat (ST)
- Stops: 12
- Distance travelled: 263 km (163 mi)
- Average journey time: 4 hours 40 minutes
- Service frequency: Daily
- Train number: 12921 / 12922

On-board services
- Classes: AC Chair Car, First Class, Non AC Seating LHB coach(2S)
- Seating arrangements: Yes
- Sleeping arrangements: No
- Catering facilities: Discontinued

Technical
- Rolling stock: LHB coach (from July 2023)
- Track gauge: 1,676 mm (5 ft 6 in)
- Operating speed: 110 km/h (68 mph) maximum, 56 km/h (35 mph) average including halts

The 12921/12922 Flying Ranee is a superfast express train belonging to Indian Railways that runs between Mumbai Central (MMCT) and Surat (ST) in India. It is a daily service. It operates as train number 12922 from Surat to Mumbai Central and as train number 12921 in the reverse direction.

== Coaches ==
Flying Ranee is presently operated with an LHB rake consisting of 2 reserved AC chair car coaches, 7 Reserved chair car coaches, 6 General Second class coaches, 1 General second class coaches earmarked for First class MST passholders, 1 General second class coach earmarked for Second class MST passholders, 1 General second class coach earmarked for ladies, 1 General second class earmarked for Second class MST ladies passholders, 1 End-on Generation coach & 1 Seating cum Luggage coach.

This train's rake previously used to include double decker non-AC coaches. These coaches were removed when the train was upgraded with an LHB rake in July 2023.

== Service and history ==
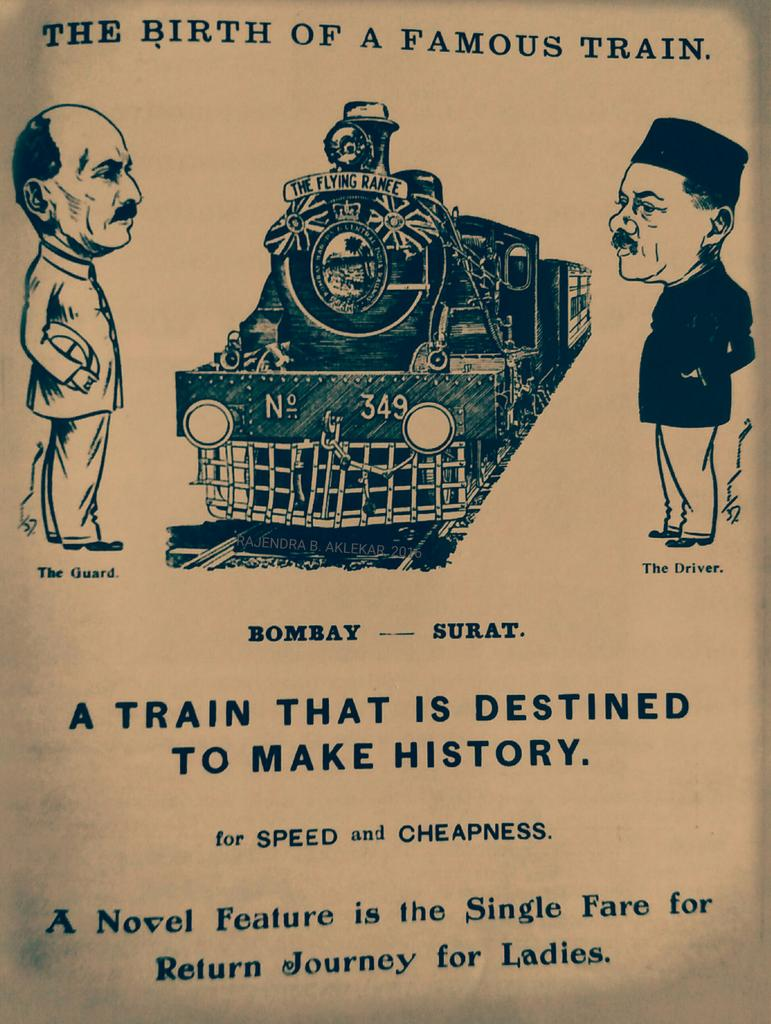

Flying Ranee is a classic train that started in India in its Pre-Independence phase. This train started operating in the year 1906. But on 24 April 1914, it was discontinued. The Flying Ranee was restarted on 1 May 1937 as a weekend special. It ran between 1937 and 1939, when it was discontinued due to World War II. Since then, it had been discontinued and restarted several times. It finally resumed operations on 1 November 1950 and has been running ever since. On 18 December 1979, double-decker cars were added to the Flying Ranee's rake. Presently it is a daily service.

It covers the distance of 263 kilometres in 4 hours 40 minutes as 12922 Flying Ranee (56.35 km/h) and 4 hours 40 minutes as 12921 Flying Ranee (55.37 km/h).

== Traction ==
earlier with Non AC Double Decker coach rake WCAM-3 used to pull this train. The train is usually hauled by a Vadodara-based WAP-7 or WAP-5 locomotive.

Prior to the completion of the DC to AC electric conversion of the line on 5 February 2012, dual-traction WCAM-1 locomotive usually hauled the train between Mumbai and Surat.

== Time table ==
12922 Flying Ranee leaves Surat at 05:05 AM IST every day and reaches Mumbai Central at 09:45 AM IST the same day.

12921 Flying Ranee leaves Mumbai Central at 17:55 PM IST every day and reaches Surat at 22:35 PM IST the same day.

== Route and halts ==
The important halts of the train are:

- Mumbai Central
- Andheri
- Borivali
- Palghar
- Boisar
- Dahanu Road
- Vapi
- Udvada
- Valsad
- Bilimora Junction
- Amalsad
- Navsari
- Maroli
- Sachin
- Udhna Junction
- Surat

== Gallery ==
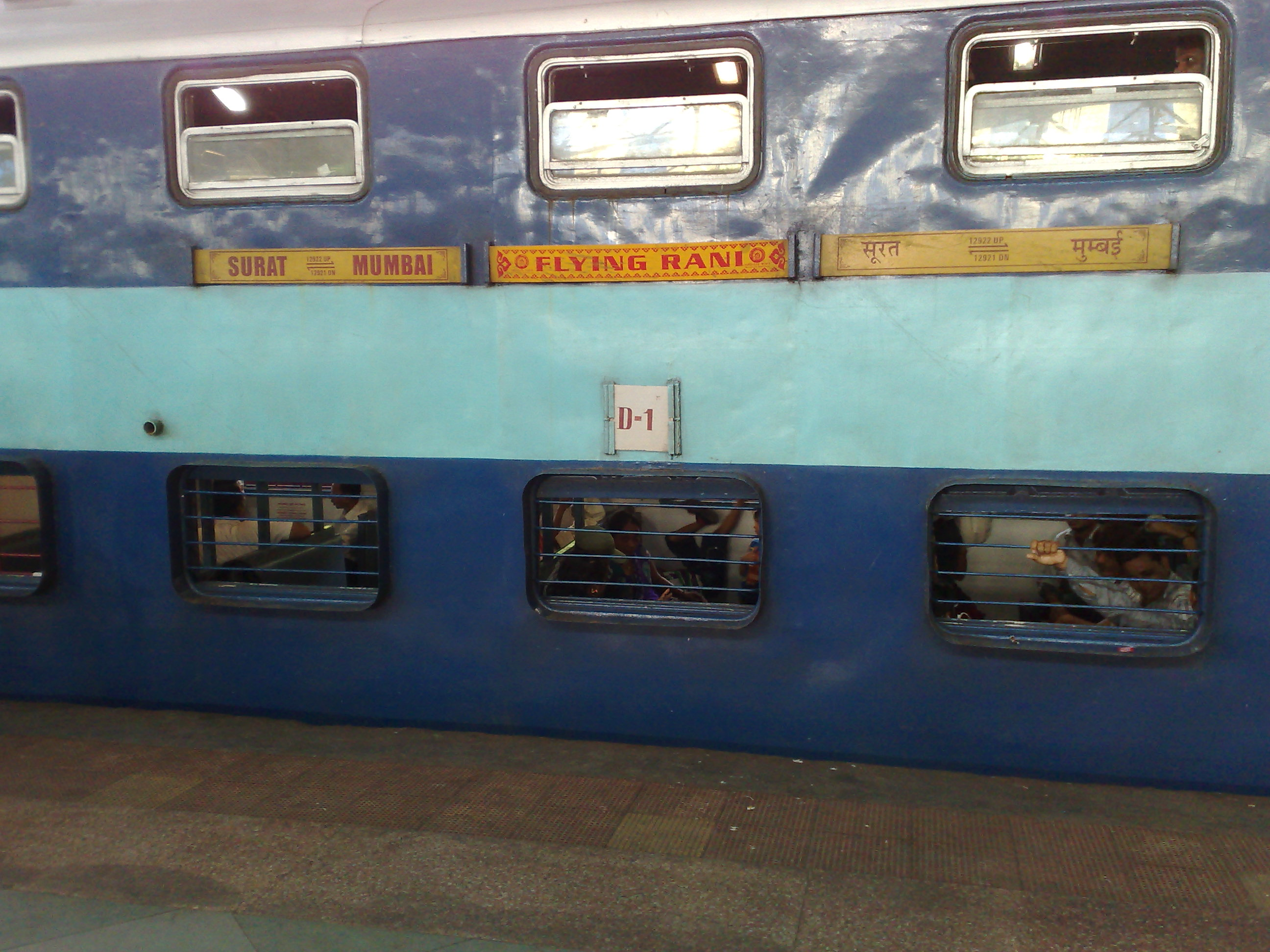
Flying Ranee Double Decker

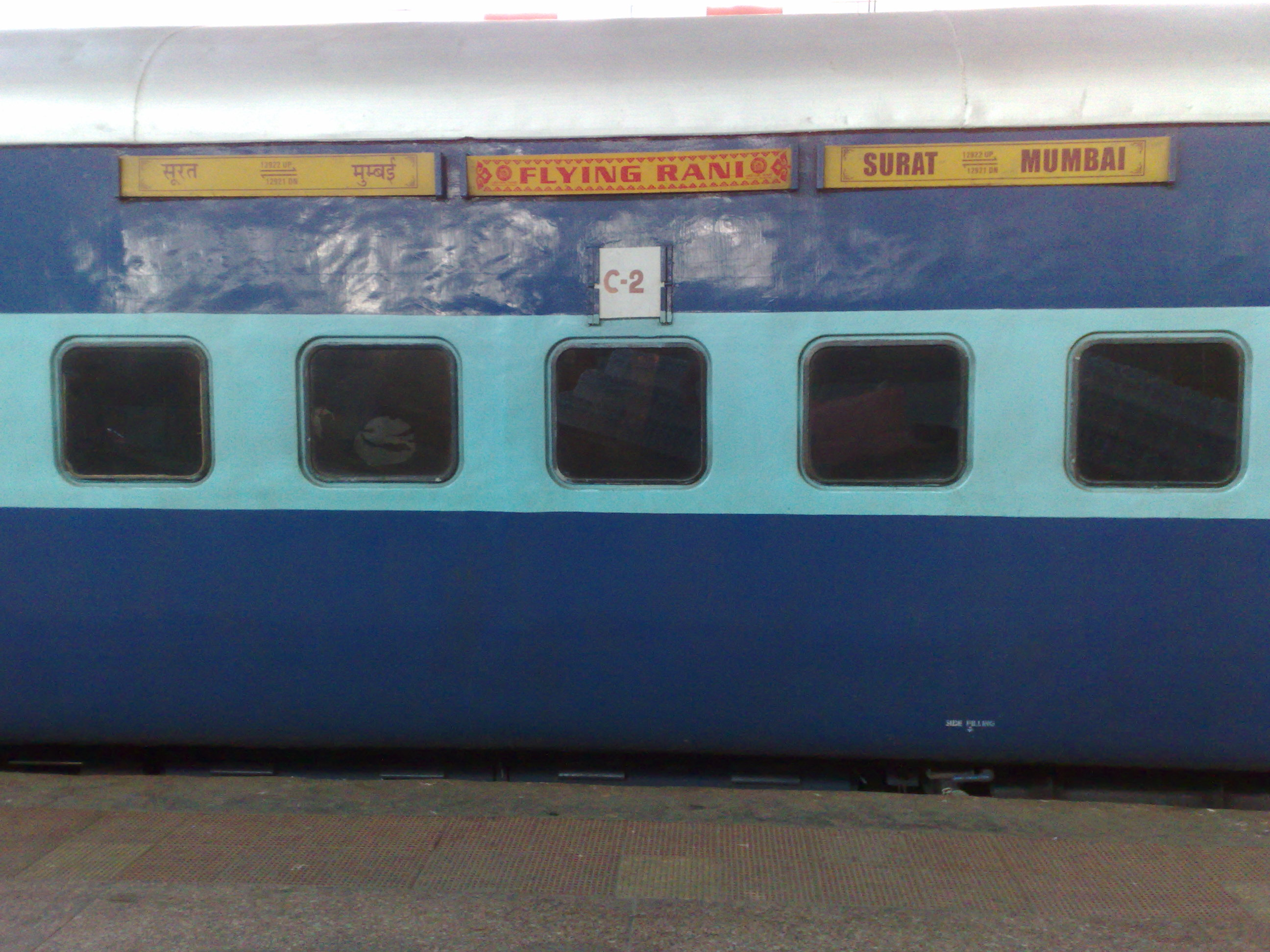
Flying Ranee Chair Car

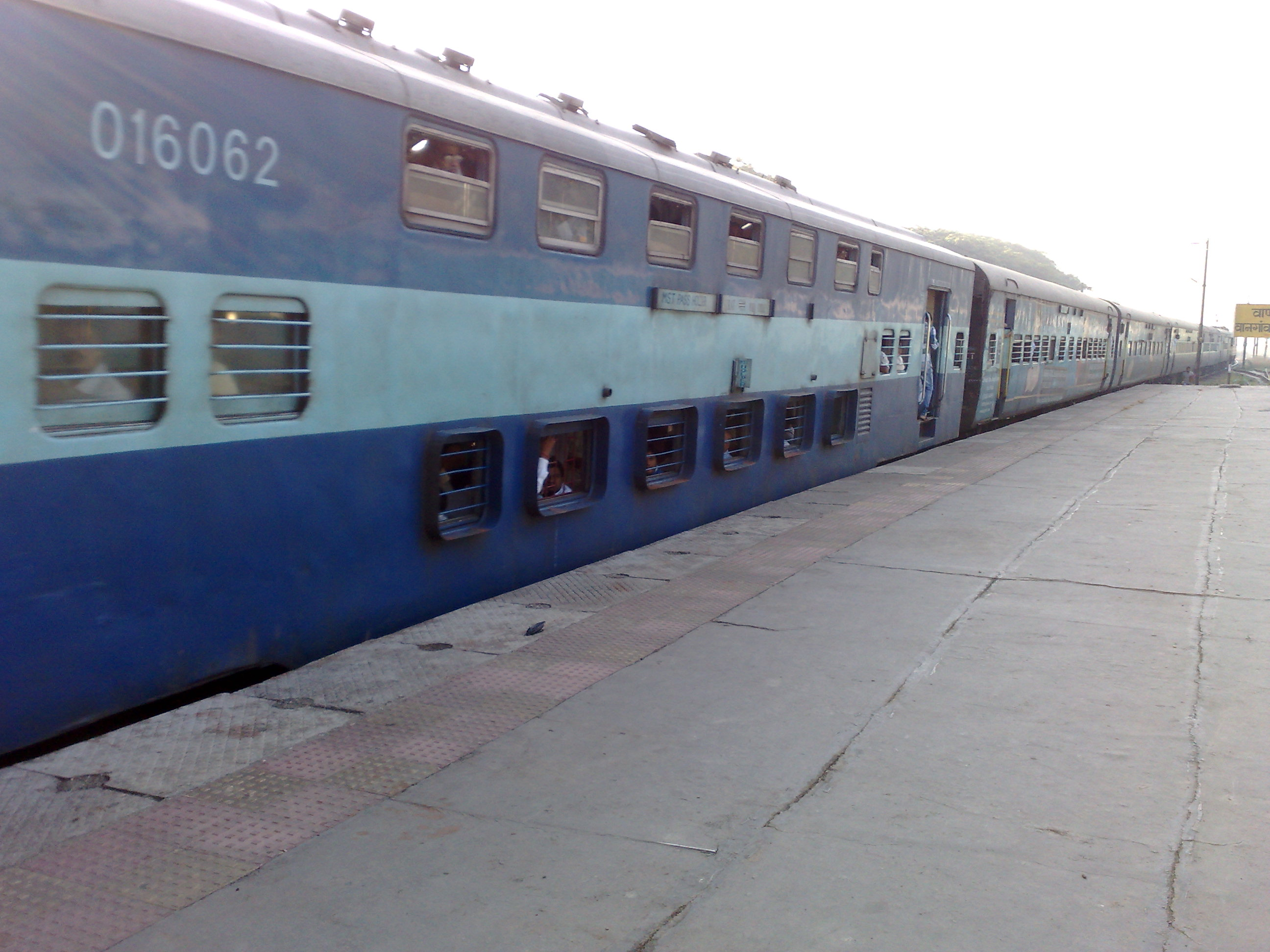
Flying Ranee at Vangaon railway station

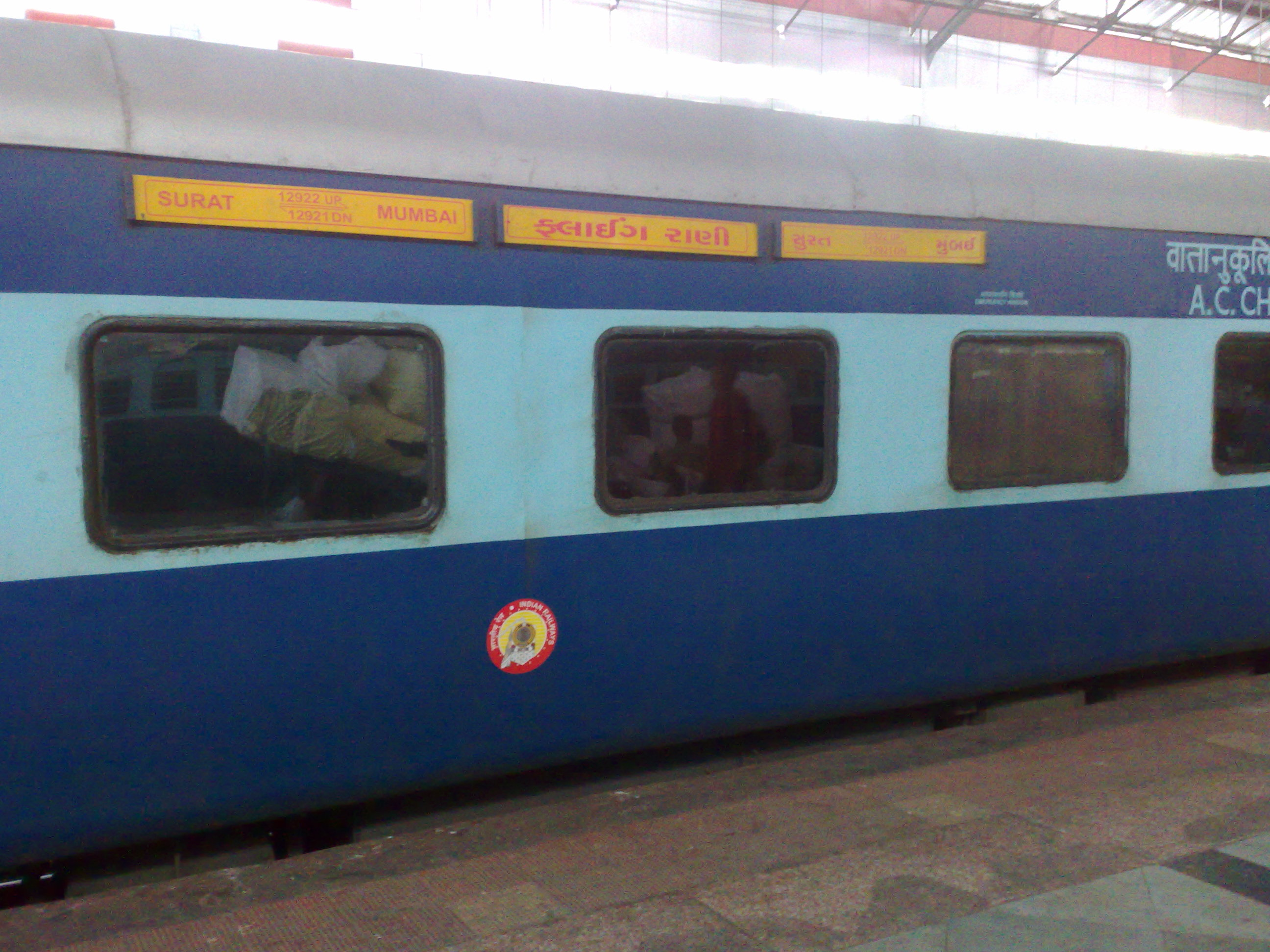
12921 Flying Ranee – AC Chair Car coach

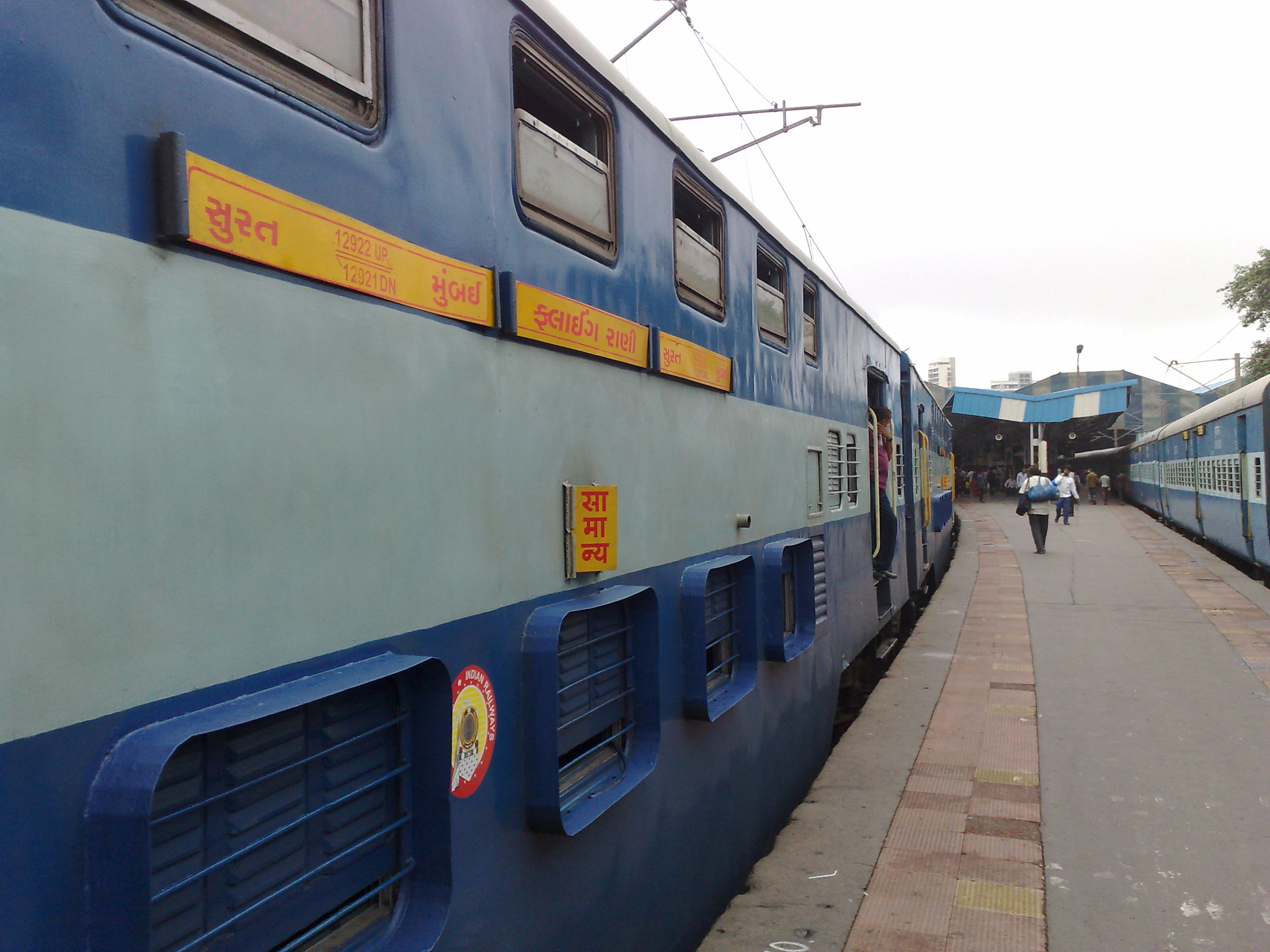
12921 Flying Ranee at Mumbai Central
