= Valsad railway station =

Railway station in Gujarat

Valsad
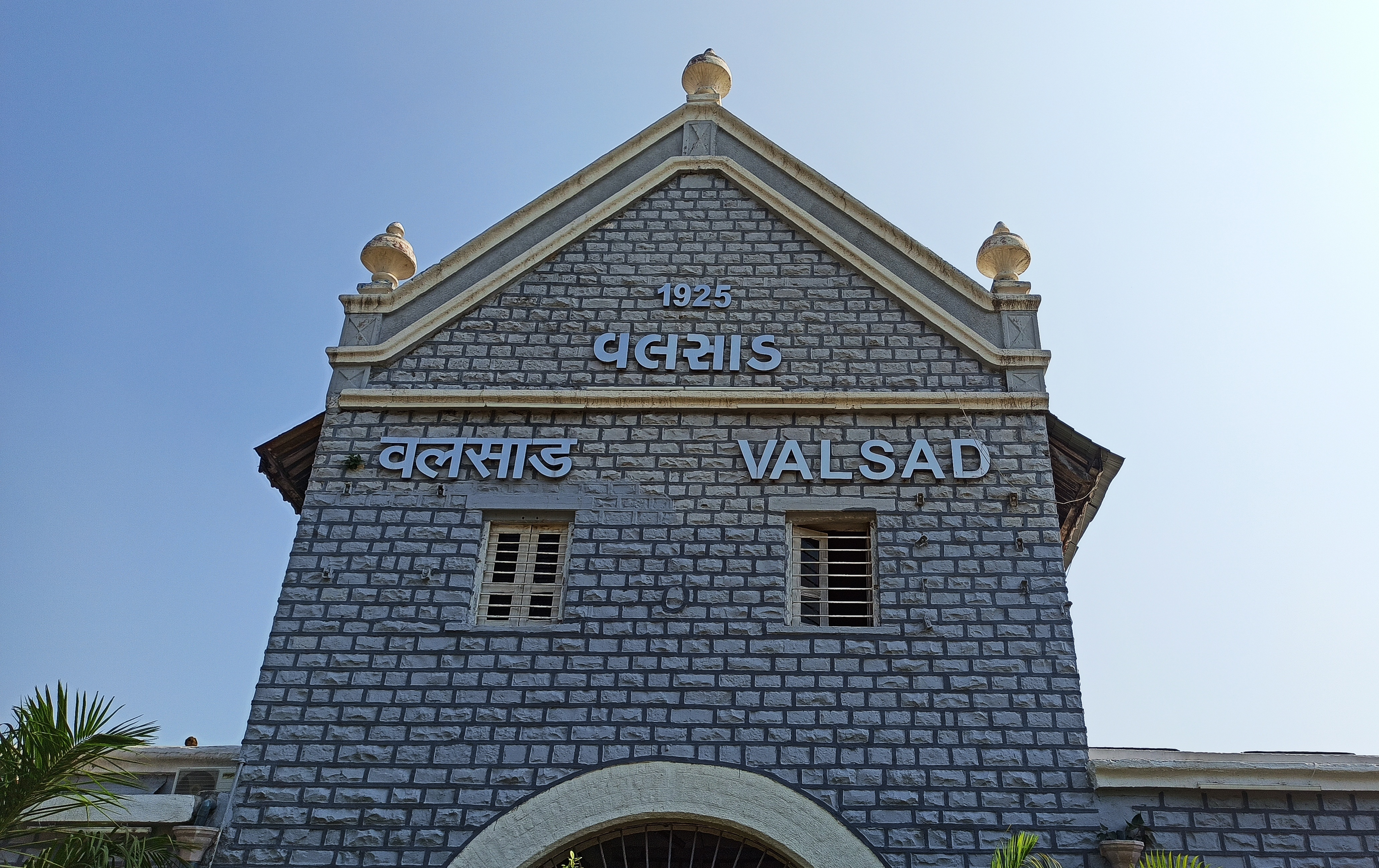
- Valsad railway station

General information
- Location: Valsad, Gujarat; India
- Coordinates: 20°36′27″N 72°55′53″E
- Elevation: 15.920 metres (52.23 ft)
- System: Indian Railways station
- Owner: Ministry of Railways, Indian Railways
- Operator: Western Railway
- Lines: New Delhi–Mumbai main line Ahmedabad–Mumbai main line
- Platforms: 5
- Tracks: 9

Construction
- Structure type: Standard (on ground)
- Parking: Available
- Accessible: Yes

Other information
- Status: Functioning
- Station code: BL
- Zone(s): Western Railway
- Division(s): Mumbai WR
- Classification: NSG3

History
- Former names: Bulsar

Services
| Preceding station | Indian Railways | Following station |
|---|---|---|
| Dungri towards ? | New Delhi–Mumbai main line | Atul towards ? |
Location
- Location within India Location within Gujarat

Valsad railway station (station code:- BL) is a railway station of Western Railway Zone in the state of Gujarat, India. It serves the city of Valsad.

== History ==
Grant Road-Valsad section was opened in 1864. The length of Grant Road-Valsad section was 194 km. Valsad-Navsari section was opened in 1861. The length of Valsad-Navsari section was 39 km.

The railway station building was established in 1925.

== Infrastructure ==
Valsad is an A category railway station of Mumbai WR railway division of Western Railway zone of Indian Railways. Valsad is only non-junction railway station having five platforms and 3-4 freight sidings in South Gujarat. Adjacent to the railway station is the Valsad Electric Loco Shed which houses over 100 electric locomotives.

Valsad station has been renovated in European style recently. Valsad station's main entrance, waiting hall, ticket counter building, food stall, parking are revamped. The tiles floor, rain water harvesting and vertical garden have been added.

On 15 August 2021, The National Flag was hoisted at a height of more than 100 feet by Shri ARM Annu Tyagi of Valsad and added another dimension to Valsad's splendor.

== Facilities ==
The station offers the following amenities: WiFi, parking, ATM, food stalls, footover bridge, Escalator, coach indicator, parcel office, passenger reservation center, waiting room and toilets.

== Major trains ==
The following trains start from Valsad railway station:

| Train No. | Train name | Destination |
|---|---|---|
| 19033/34 | Gujarat Queen | Ahmedabad Junction |
| 20959/60 | Valsad–Vadnagar Intercity Superfast Express | Vadnagar |
| 19011/12 | Valsad–Dahod Intercity Express | Dahod |
| 12929/30 | Valsad–Vadodara Intercity Superfast Express | Vadodara |
| 12911/12 | Valsad–Haridwar Superfast Express | Haridwar |
| 22909/10 | Valsad–Puri Superfast Express | Puri |
| 22991/92 | Valsad–Bhagat Ki Kothi Weekly Express | Bhagat Ki Kothi |
| 19051/52 | Shramik Express | Muzaffarpur Junction |
| 12943/44 | Udyog Karmi Express | Kanpur Central |
| 59049/50 | Valsad–Vadodara Passenger | Vadodara Junction |
| 59046 | Valsad–Bandra Terminus Passenger | Bandra Terminus |
| 59023/24 | Mumbai Central–Valsad Fast Passenger | Mumbai Central |
| 69151/52 | Valsad–Surat MEMU | Surat |
| 69153/54 | Umargam Road–Valsad MEMU | Umargam Road |

== Gallery ==
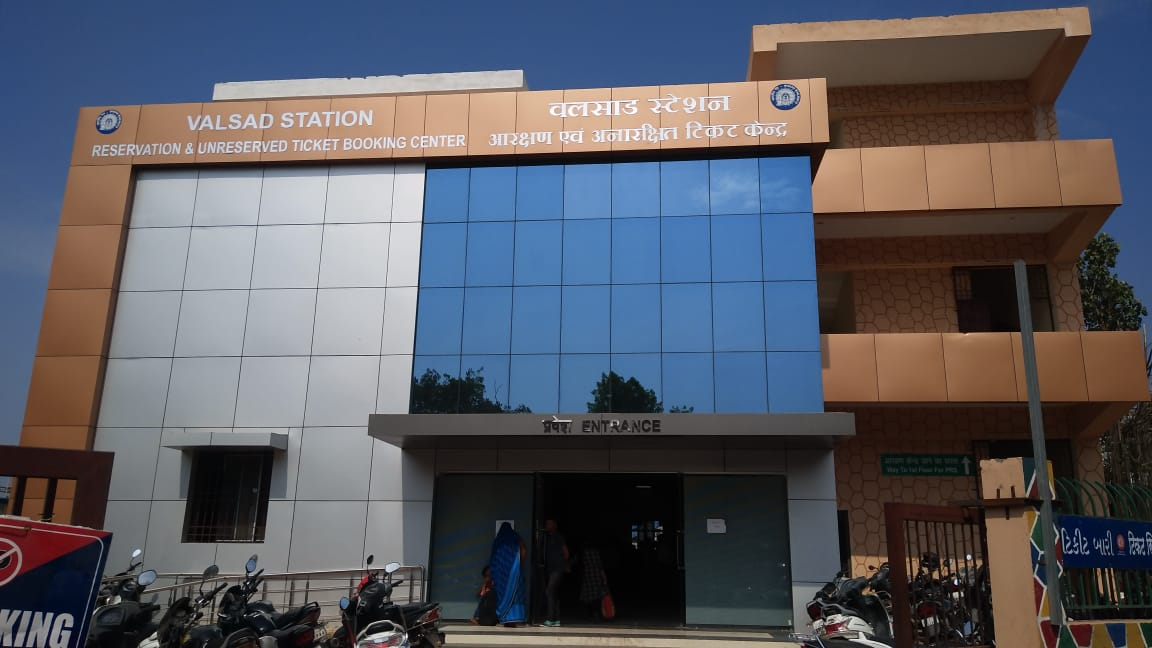
Valsad station ticket center

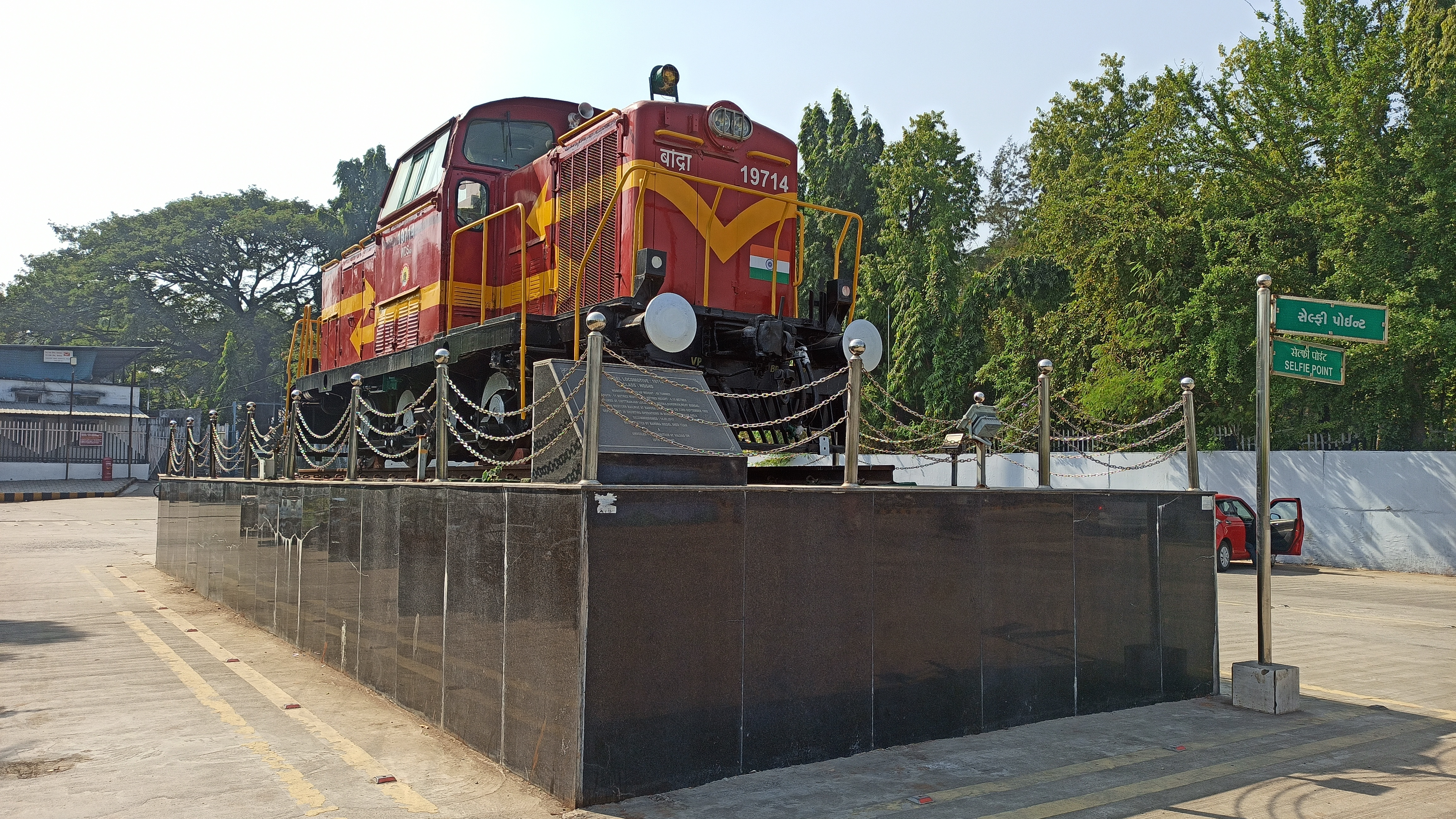
Selfie Point at Valsad Station

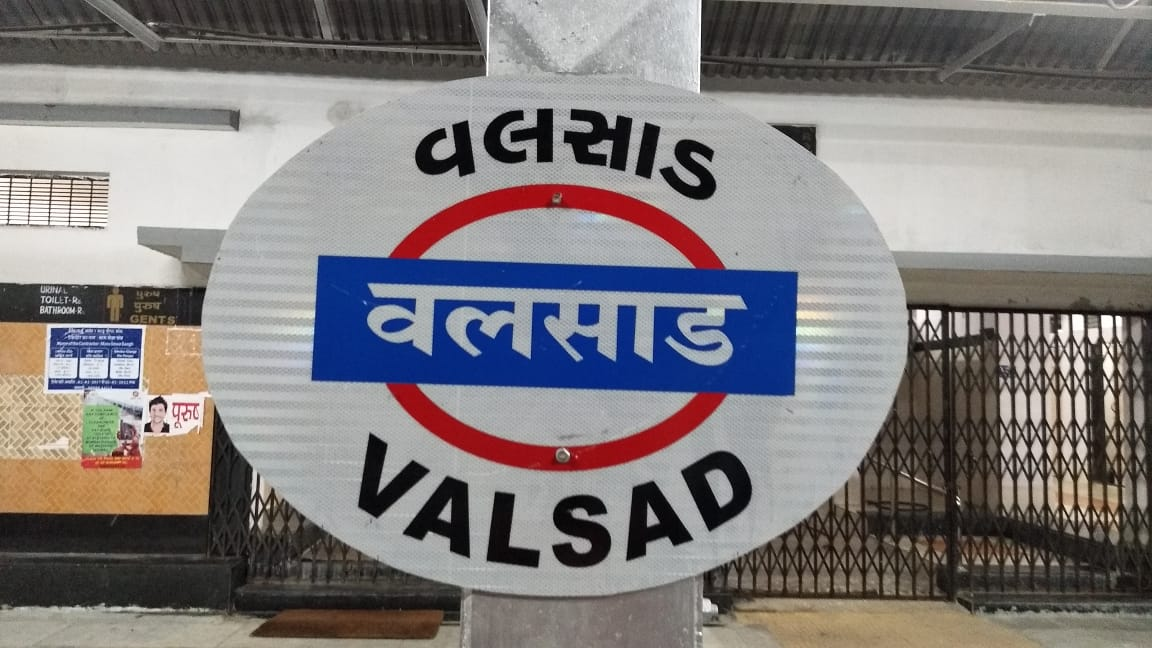
Valsad platform board

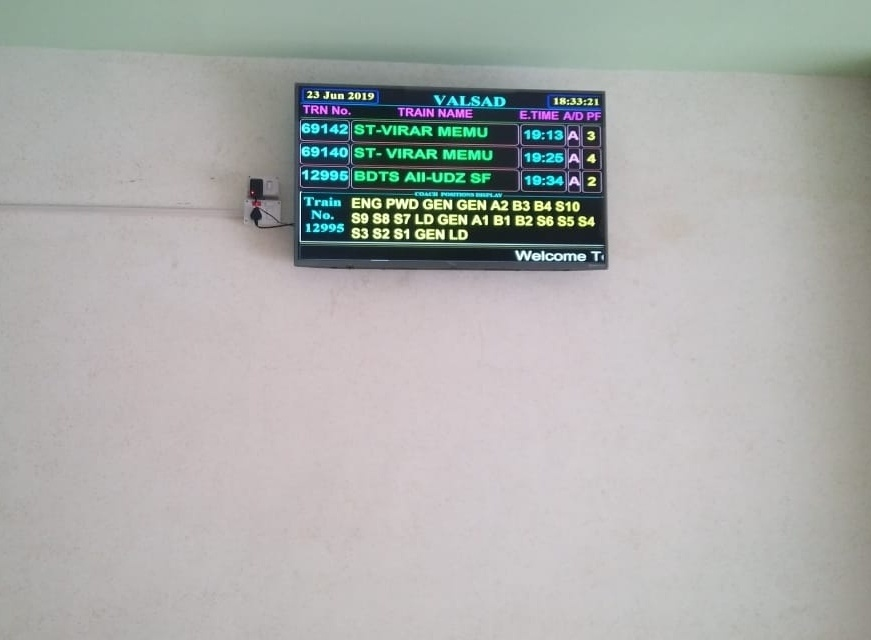
Train indicator at Valsad

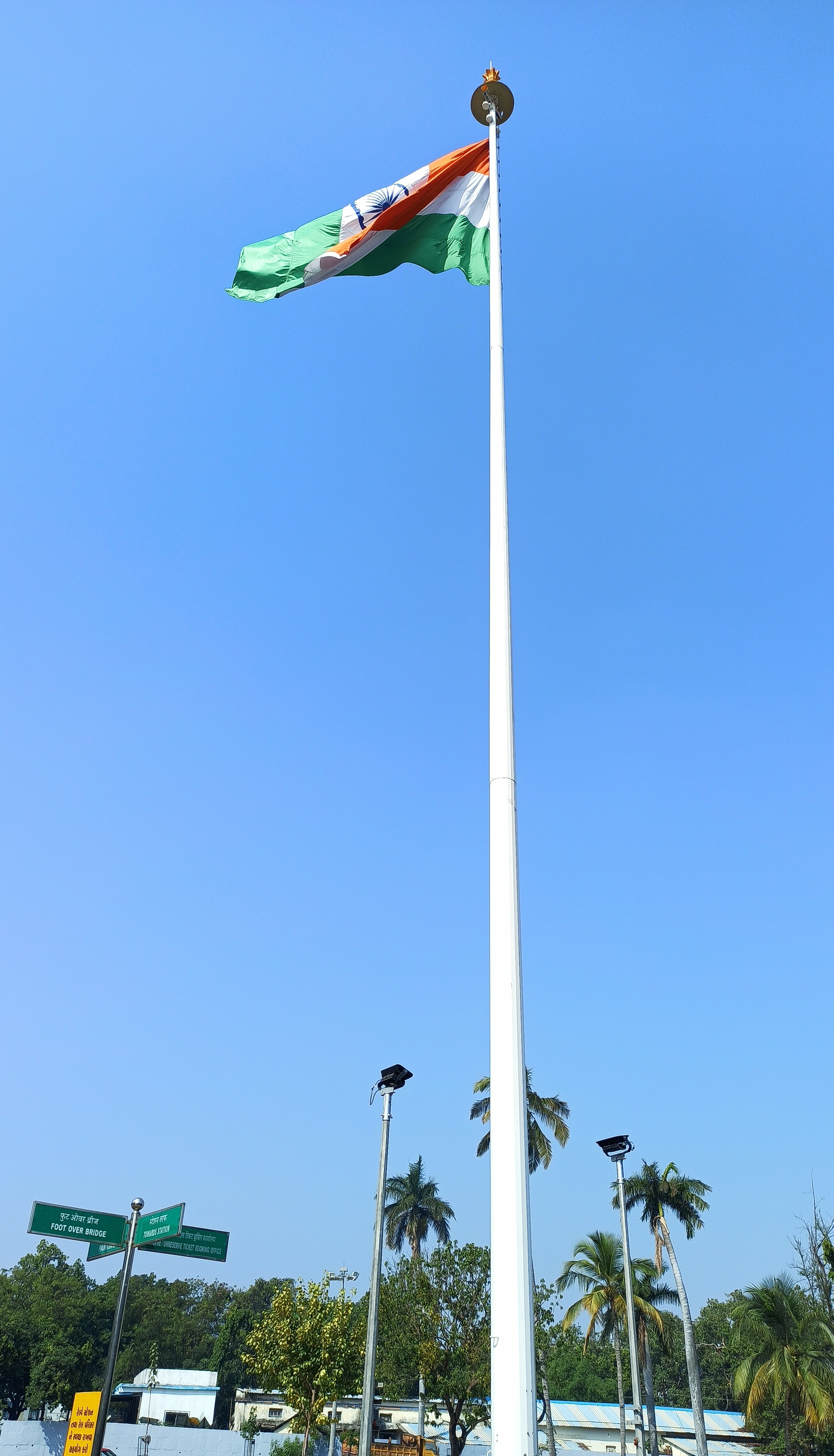
National Flag at Valsad Station

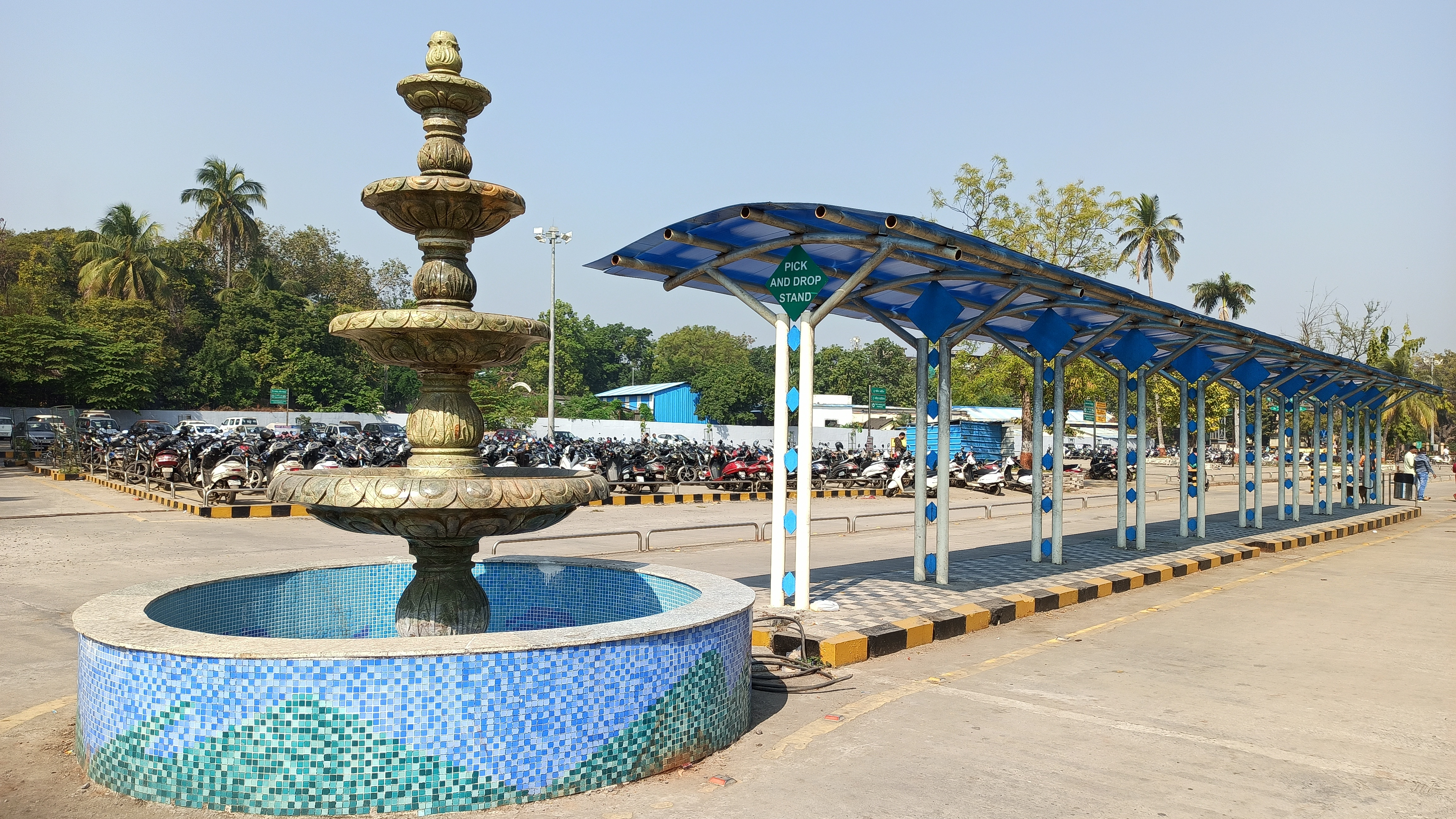
Fountain and Pickup Point at Valsad Station
