= Surat railway station =

Railway station in Gujarat, India

Surat સુરત
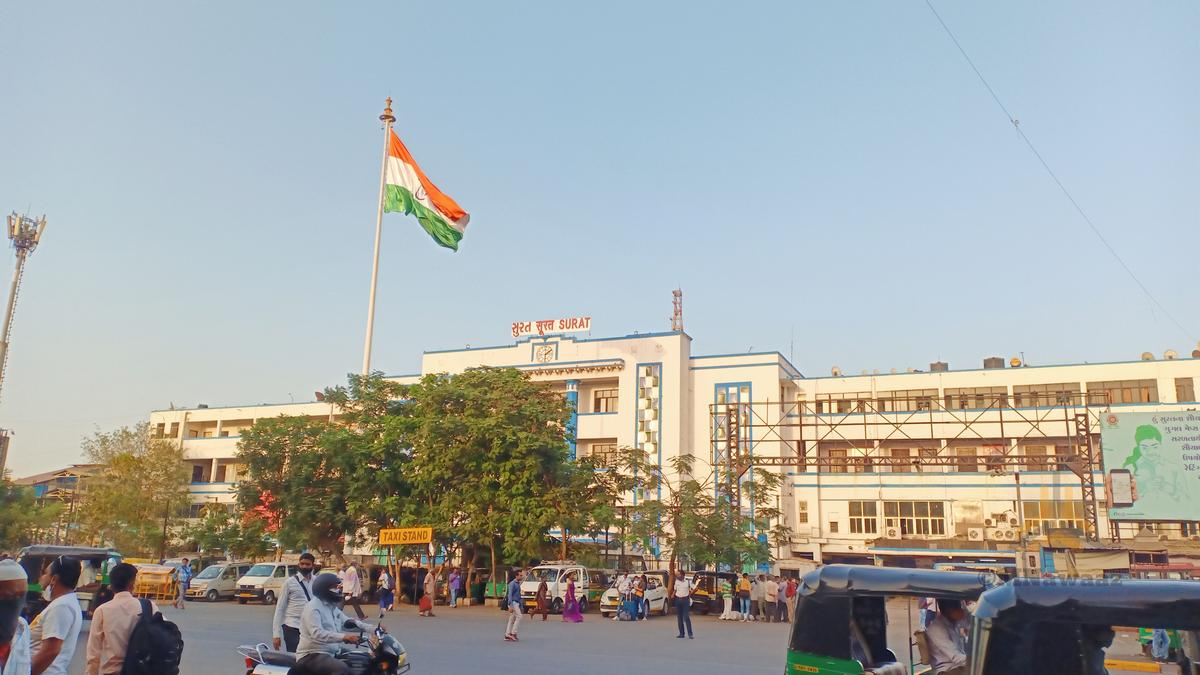
- Surat railway station

General information
- Location: Lal Darwaja Station Rd, Suryapur Gate, Varachha, Surat, Gujarat 395003; India
- Coordinates: 21°12′20″N 72°50′27″E
- Elevation: 59.220 metres (194.29 ft)
- Owner: Indian Railways
- Operator: Western Railway zone
- Line: New Delhi–Mumbai main line
- Platforms: 4 (2 side and 1 island platform)
- Tracks: 6
- Connections: Sitilink: 01, 02, 17A, 18, 19, 20, 21, 23, 102R, 104, 105, 106R, 106S, 107J, 112, 116BR, 116R, 117, 117P, 118, 126R, 127J, 136, 137J, 146, 147J, 153R, 254, 402

Construction
- Structure type: Above-grade
- Parking: Yes

Other information
- Status: Ongoing Partial Redevelopment
- Station code: ST
- Zone(s): Western Railway zone
- Division(s): Mumbai WR

History
- Opened: 1852; 174 years ago
- Electrified: 1970; 56 years ago

Services
Preceding station	Indian Railways	Following station
Vadodara Junction towards New Delhi	New Delhi–Mumbai main line	Mumbai Central Terminus
Location
- Location within Gujarat Location within India

Surat Railway Station (Code: ST) is a major railway station serving Surat, beside Gothangam, Kosad, Utran, Udhna Junction, Bhestan, Niyol and Sachin. It is under the administrative control of the Western Railway zone of the Indian Railways. Surat is A1 – category railway station of Western Railway Zone of Indian Railways. It is on the Ahmedabad–Vadodara–Mumbai rail route. The railway station was built in 1860.

Going north, Utran Railway Station is the nearest railhead. Udhna Junction Railway Station is to the south of Surat.

In early 2016, the Indian Railway Catering and Tourism Corporation rated the facility the best large station in India based on cleanliness. Railway station of Surat is on the first floor from ground.

The nearest international airport is Surat Airport.

== Station layout ==
	Platform 1	Side platform
→	Track 1	22-car train
←	Track 2	22-car train
	Platform 2 / 3	Island platform Under renovation; limited access in effect.
→	Track 3	22-car train
←	Track 4
→	Track 5
←	Track 6	22-car train
	Platform 4	Side platform

== Major trains ==
Following trains start from Surat railway station:

- 12935/36 Surat–Bandra Terminus Intercity Superfast Express
- 12921/22 Surat–Mumbai Central Flying Ranee Superfast Express
- 26903/04 Surat – Udaipur City Vande Bharat Express
- 12945/46 Surat–Chhapra Tapti Ganga Express
- 09065/66 Surat–Chhapra Special Clone
- 22947/48 Surat–Bhagalpur Tapti Ganga Superfast Express
- 19053/54 Surat–Muzaffarpur Express
- 20955/56 Surat–Mahuva Superfast Express
- 13425/26 Surat–Malda Town Express
- 19025/26 Surat–Amravati Express
- 22827/28 Surat–Puri Superfast Express

== Gallery ==
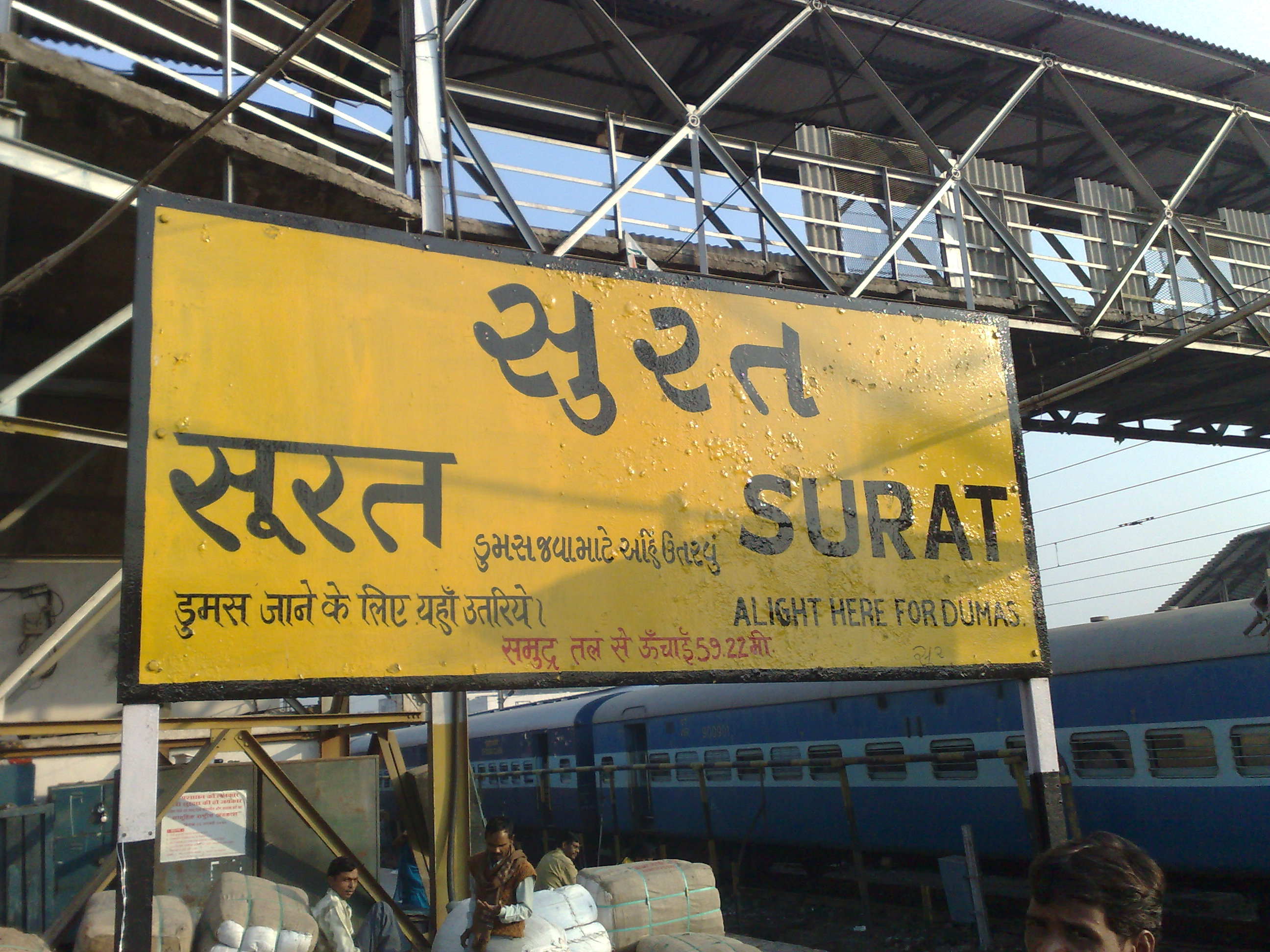
Surat Railway Station

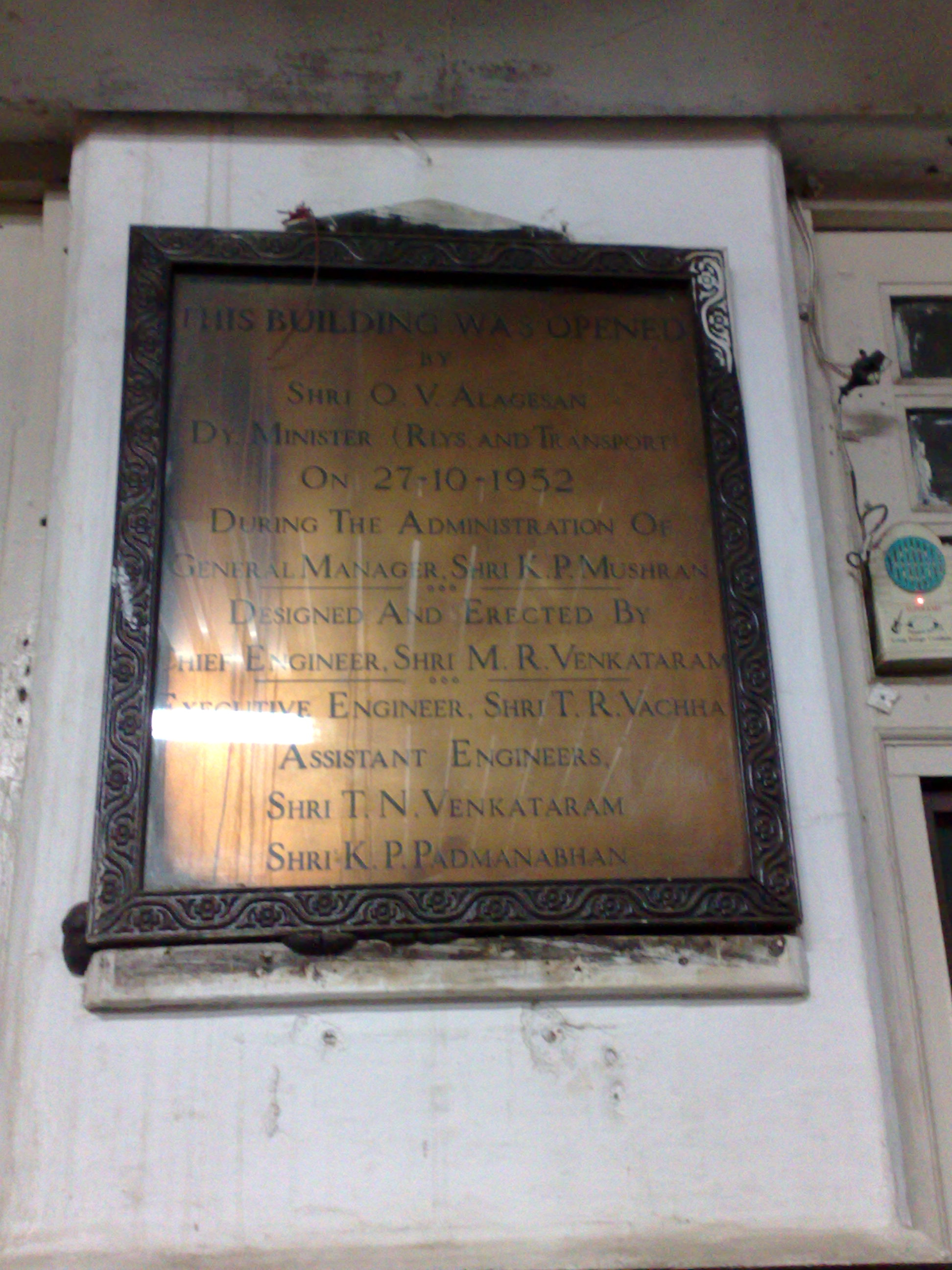
Surat opening plaque

Surat Railway Station

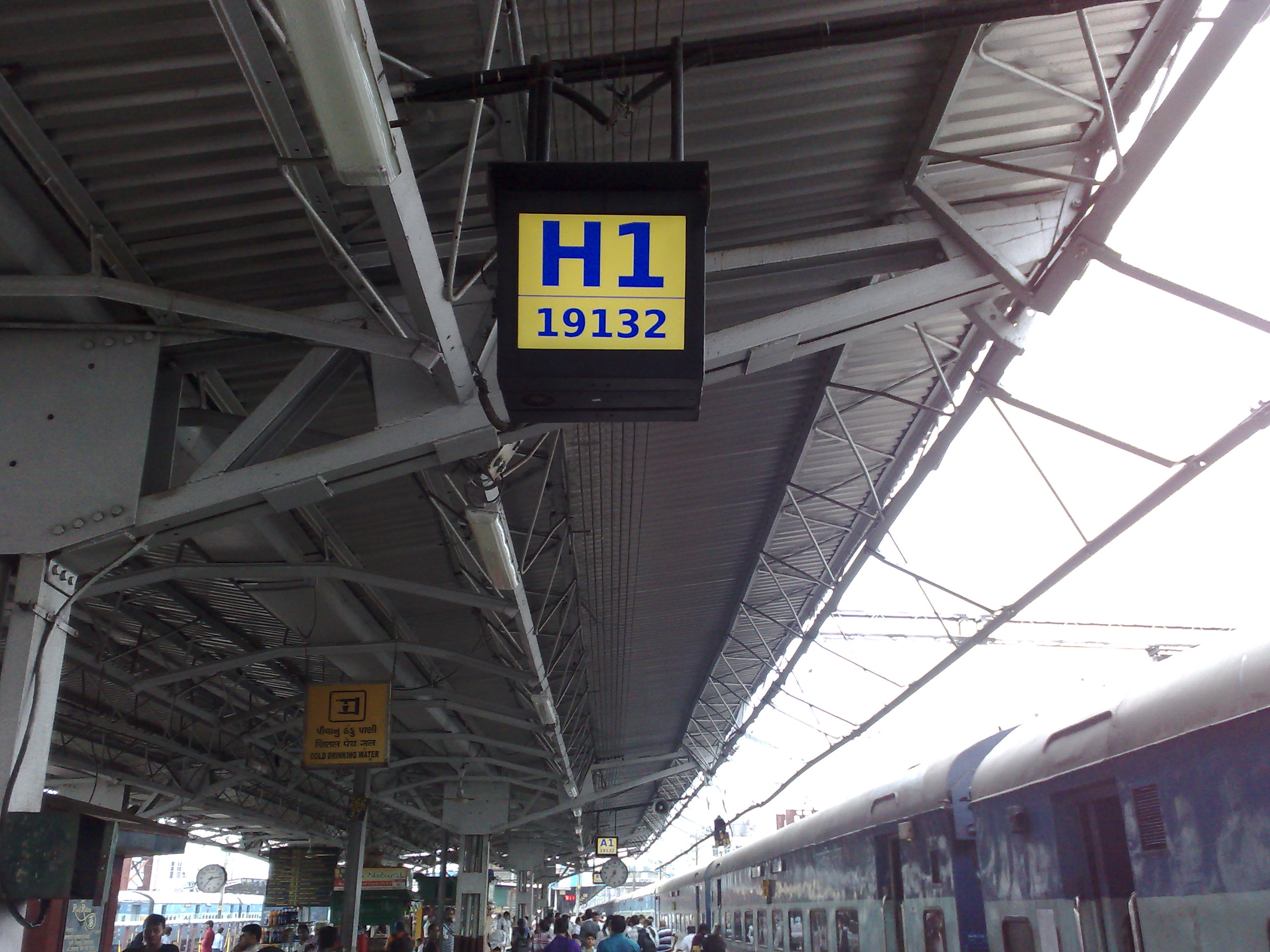
New electronic coach indicators at Surat

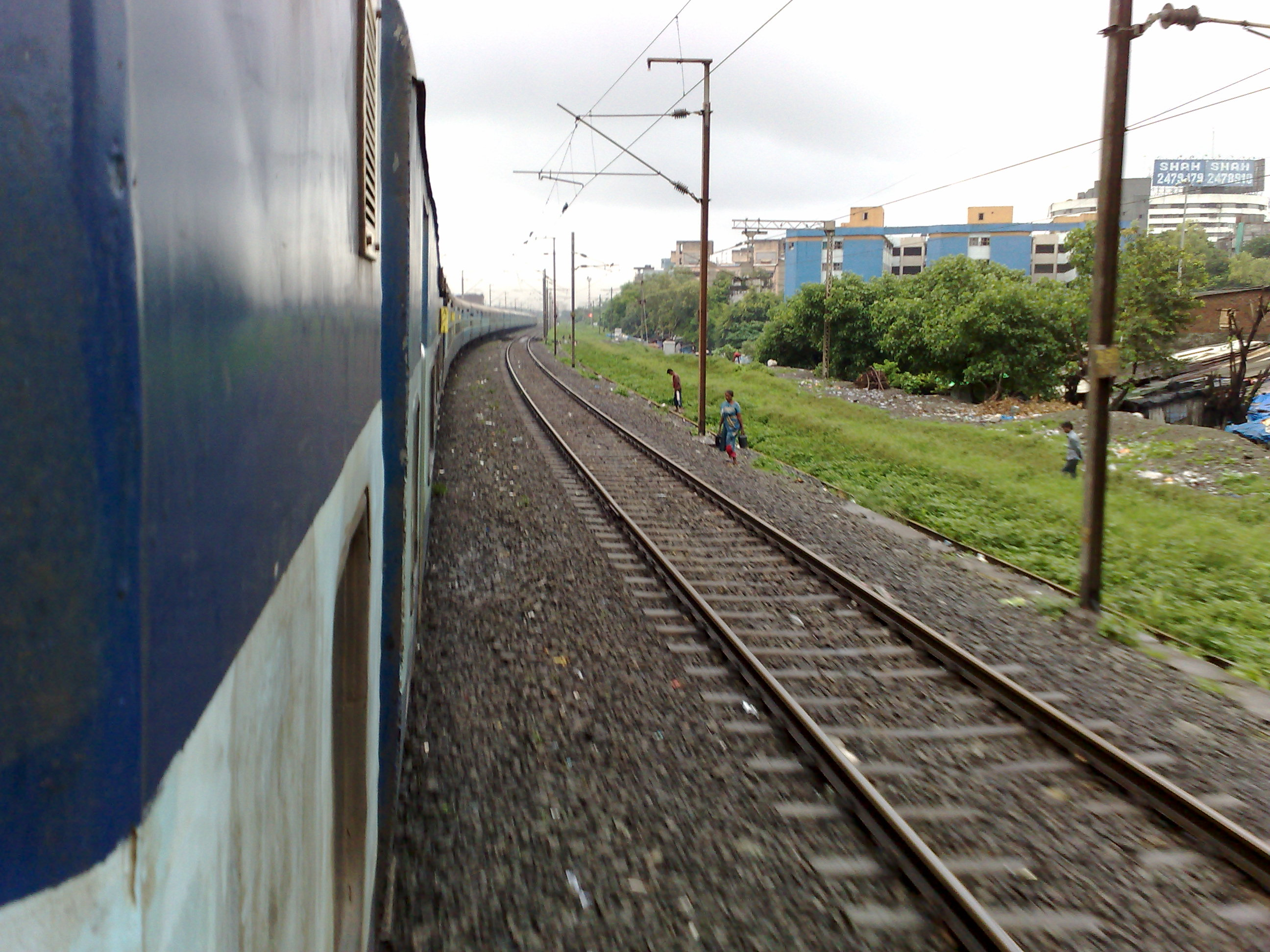
19132 Kutch Express at a curve outside Surat

== See also ==
- Surat International Airport
- Surat BRTS
- Surat Metro
- Surat high-speed railway station
