= Vadodara–Kota Express =

Train in India

Vadodara-Kota Express

Overview
- Service type: Express
- Locale: Gujarat, Madhya Pradesh & Rajasthan
- Current operator: Weste Central Railway

Route
- Termini: Vadodara (BRC); Kota Junction (KOTA)
- Stops: 55
- Distance travelled: 527 km (327 mi)
- Average journey time: 14 hrs 20 mins
- Service frequency: Daily (Note: Runs seven days in a week for every direction.)
- Train number: 19819 / 19820

On-board services
- Class: General Unreserved
- Seating arrangements: Yes
- Sleeping arrangements: No
- Auto-rack arrangements: Overhead racks
- Catering facilities: Not available
- Observation facilities: Large windows
- Baggage facilities: No
- Other facilities: Below the seats

Technical
- Rolling stock: ICF coach
- Track gauge: 5 ft 6 in (1,676 mm)
- Operating speed: 37 km/h (23 mph) average including halts.

The 19819 / 19820 Vadodara–Kota Express is an express train of the Indian Railways, which runs between Kota Junction in Rajasthan and Vadodara Junction in Gujarat. It is currently being operated with 19819/19820 train numbers on a weekly basis.

== Service ==
The 19819/Vadodara–Kota Express runs with an average speed of 37 km/h and completes 527 km in 14h 20m. The 19820/Kota-Vadodara Express runs with an average speed of 37 km/h and completes 527 km in 14h 20m.

== Route & Halts ==
The important halts of the train are:

- Vadodara Junction
- Chhayapuri
- Samlaya Junction
- Champaner Road
- Derol
- Godhra Junction
- Piplod
- Limkheda
- Dahod
- Anas
- Meghnagar
- Thandla Road
- Ratlam Junction
- Khachrod
- Nagda Junction
- Vikramgarh Alot
- Bhawani Mandi
- Jhalawar Road
- Ramganj Mandi Junction
- Kota Junction

== Coach composite ==
The train has standard ICF rakes with max speed of 110 kmph. The train consists of 11 coaches:

- 9 General Unreserved
- 2 Seating cum Luggage/parcel van.

== Traction ==
Both trains are hauled by a Valsad Loco Shed based WAP-4 or Vadodara Loco Shed based WAP-5 electric locomotive from Kota to Vadodara and vice versa.

== See also ==
- Kota Junction railway station
- Vadodara Junction railway station
- Vadodara–Dahod MEMU
- Dahod–Ratlam MEMU
