= Valsad–Dahod Intercity Express =

Train in India

Valsad - Dahod Intercity Express
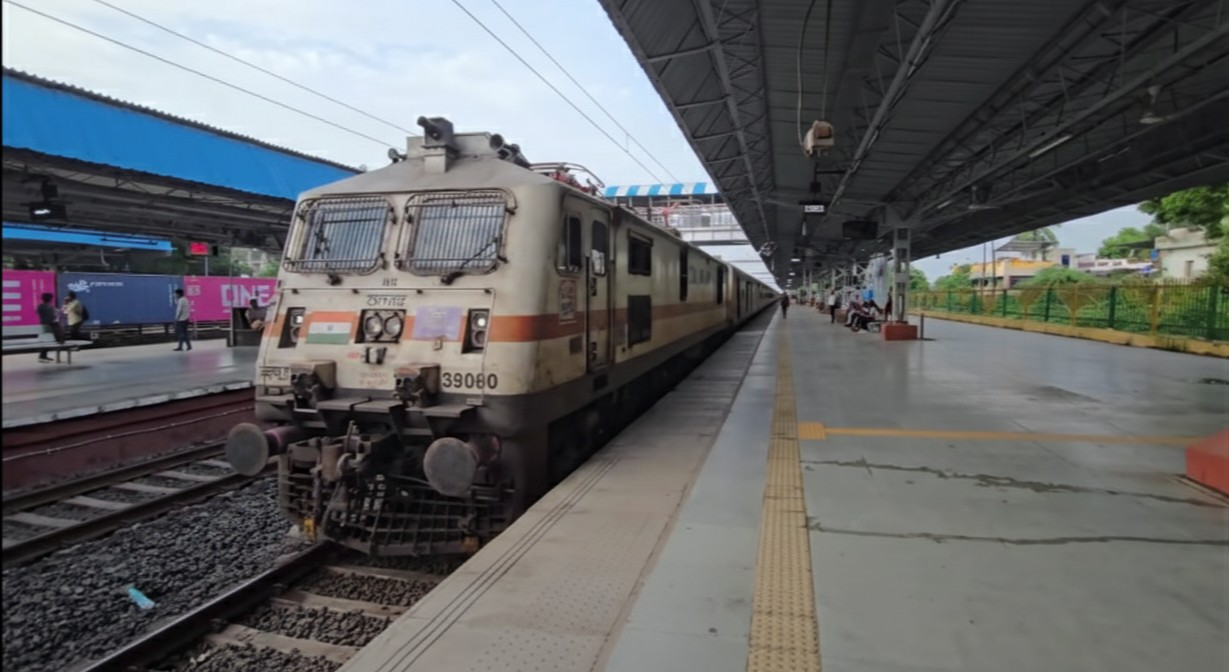
- Valsad Dahod Intercity Express arriving Ankleshwar Junction

Overview
- Service type: Express
- Status: Active
- Locale: Gujarat
- First service: 27 May 2025; 15 months ago
- Current operator: Western Railway (WR)

Route
- Termini: Valsad (BL); Dahod (DHD)
- Stops: 14
- Distance travelled: 346 km (215 mi)
- Average journey time: 5h 50m
- Service frequency: Daily
- Train number: 19011 / 19012

On-board services
- Classes: General Unreserved, AC Reserved Chair Car, AC Chair Car
- Seating arrangements: Yes
- Sleeping arrangements: No
- Catering facilities: No
- Observation facilities: Large windows
- Baggage facilities: No
- Other facilities: Below the seats

Technical
- Rolling stock: LHB coach
- Track gauge: 1,676 mm (5 ft 6 in)
- Electrification: 25 kV 50 Hz AC Overhead line
- Operating speed: 130 km/h (81 mph) maximum, 59 km/h (37 mph) average including halts.
- Track owner: Indian Railways

The 19011 / 19012 Valsad–Dahod Intercity Express is an express train belonging to Western Railway zone that runs between the city Valsad to Dahod of Gujarat in India.

It operates as train number 19011 from Valsad to Dahod and as train number 19012 in the reverse direction, serving the state of Gujarat.

== Services ==
• 19011/ Valsad–Dahod Intercity Express has an average speed of 59 km/h and covers 346 km in 5h 50m.

• 19012/ Dahod–Valsad Intercity Express has an average speed of 42 km/h and covers 346 km in 8h 10m.

== Routes and halts ==
The Important Halts of the train are :

● Valsad

● Bilimora Junction

● Navsari

● Surat

● Ankleshwar Junction

● Bharuch Junction

● Miyagam Karjan Junction

● Vadodara Junction

● Samlaya Junction

● Derol

● Godhra Junction

● Piplod

● Limkheda

● Dahod

== Schedule ==
• 19011 - 5:15 AM (Daily) [Valsad]

• 19012 - 11:15 AM (Daily) [Dahod]

== Coach composition ==
1. General Unreserved - 9
2. AC Chair Car - 2
3. AC Reserved Chair - 4

== Traction ==
As the entire route is fully electrified, it is hauled by a Valsad Loco Shed-based WAP-7 electric locomotive from Valsad to Dahod and vice versa.

== Rake share ==
The train will Rake Sharing with Valsad–Vadnagar Intercity Superfast Express (20959/20960).

== See also ==
Trains from Valsad :

1. Valsad–Puri Superfast Express
2. Valsad–Haridwar Superfast Express
3. Valsad–Jodhpur Weekly Express
4. Udyog Karmi Express
5. Gujarat Queen

Trains from Dahod :

1. Dahod–Bhopal Fast Passenger

== Notes ==
a. Runs daily in a week with both directions.
