= Derol =

- village
- Country: India
- State: Gujarat
- District: Sabarkantha

Government
  - Type: Panchayati raj (India)
  - Body: Gram panchayat

Languages
  - Official: Gujarati,
- Time zone: UTC+5:30 (IST)
- Telephone code: +912770
- Vehicle registration: GJ-9
- Website: gujaratindia.com

Derol or Dedol is a village in the Sabarkantha district of Gujarat, in western India.

== History ==
Derol was a Sixth Class princely state, including a second village in Mahi Kantha.

It had a combined population of 837 in 1901, yielding a state revenue of 1,823 Rupees (1903–1904, mostly from land), paying tributes of 513 Rupees to the Gaikwar Baroda State and 47 Rupees to Idar State.

== Geography and transportation ==
- The village's small Derol railway station connects it to Kalol, which lies on the main trunk road State Highway-5. It is connected to Godhra, 27 km to the north, and Halol (13 km) and Vadodara (50 km) to the south.
- Apart from the highway, it is connected to adjacent villages through a network of country roads. Most of the country roads are paved, single-lane and reasonably maintained. A portion of the route between Kalol and Vadodara is a toll road.

== See also ==
- Vaghela Derol, nearby village

== External links and sources ==
History

- Imperial Gazetteer on DSAL - Mahi Kantha

Footnotes
