= Vadodara–Dahod MEMU =

Train in India

Overview
- Service type: MEMU
- Locale: Gujarat
- Current operator: Western Railway

Route
- Termini: Vadodara (BRC); Dahod (DHD)
- Stops: 17
- Distance travelled: 147 km (91 mi)
- Average journey time: 3 hrs 50 mins
- Service frequency: Daily (Note: Runs seven days in a week for every direction.)
- Train number: 69119 /69120

On-board services
- Class: General Unreserved
- Seating arrangements: Yes
- Sleeping arrangements: No
- Auto-rack arrangements: Overhead racks
- Catering facilities: No
- Observation facilities: Large windows
- Entertainment facilities: No
- Baggage facilities: No
- Other facilities: Below the seats

Technical
- Rolling stock: ICF coach
- Track gauge: 5 ft 6 in (1,676 mm)
- Operating speed: 38 km/h (24 mph) average including halts.

The 69119 / 69120 Vadodara–Dahod MEMU is a MEMU train of the Indian Railways, which runs between Dahod railway station in Gujarat and Vadodara Junction railway station in Gujarat. It is currently being operated with 69119/69120 train numbers on weekly basis.

== Average speed and frequency ==
The 69119/Vadodara–Dahod MEMU runs with an average speed of 38 km/h and completes 147 km in 3h 55m. The 69120/Dahod–Vadodara MEMU runs with an average speed of 43 km/h and completes 147 km in 3h 25m.

== Route and halts ==
The important halts of the train are:

- Vadodara Junction
- Chhayapuri
- Pilol
- Alindra Road
- Samlaya Junction
- Lotana
- Champaner Road
- Bakrol
- Derol
- Kharsaliya
- Godhra Junction
- Kansudhi
- Chanchelav
- Sant Road
- Piplod
- Limkheda
- Mangal Mahudi
- Usra
- Jekot
- Rentia
- Dahod

== See also ==
- Dahod railway station
- Vadodara Junction railway station
- Ujjain–Nagda MEMU
- Dahod–Ratlam MEMU
