= Shanti Express =

Train in India

Overview
- Service type: Express
- First service: 1 July 2004; 20 years ago
- Current operator(s): Western Railway

Route
- Termini: Indore Junction (INDB); Gandhinagar Capital (GNC)
- Stops: 18
- Distance travelled: 570 km (354 mi)
- Average journey time: 12 hrs 10 mins
- Service frequency: Daily
- Train number(s): 19309 / 19310

On-board services
- Class(es): AC First Class, AC 2 Tier, AC 3 Tier, Sleeper Class, General Unreserved
- Seating arrangements: Yes
- Sleeping arrangements: Yes
- Catering facilities: On-board catering
- Observation facilities: Large windows
- Baggage facilities: Available
- Other facilities: Below the seats

Technical
- Rolling stock: LHB coach
- Track gauge: 1,676 mm (5 ft 6 in)
- Operating speed: 47 km/h (29 mph) average including halts.

The 19309 / 19310 Shanti Express is a daily express train offered by Western Railways in India. It runs between Indore Junction of Indore City in the state of Madhya Pradesh and Gandhinagar, the capital of Gujarat. The name Shanti means 'peace' which reflects the peace messages given by the father of the nation Mahatma Gandhi.

== Coach composition ==
The train consists of 18 coaches :

- 1 AC First Class
- 2 AC II Tier
- 6 AC III Tier
- 7 Sleeper Class
- 4 General Unreserved
- 1 Seating cum Luggage Rake
- 1 EOG coach

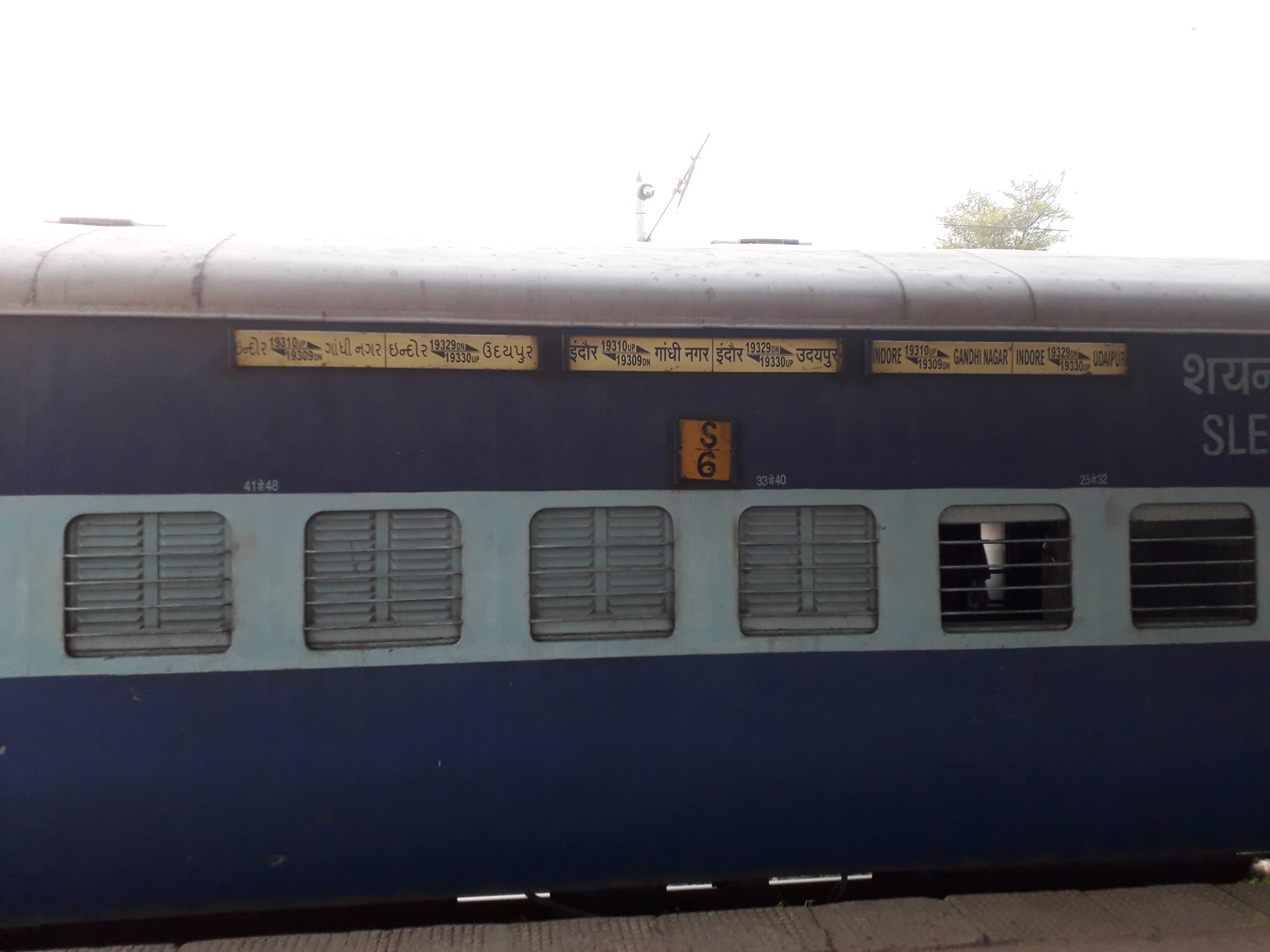
Shanti Express – Sleeper Class Coach

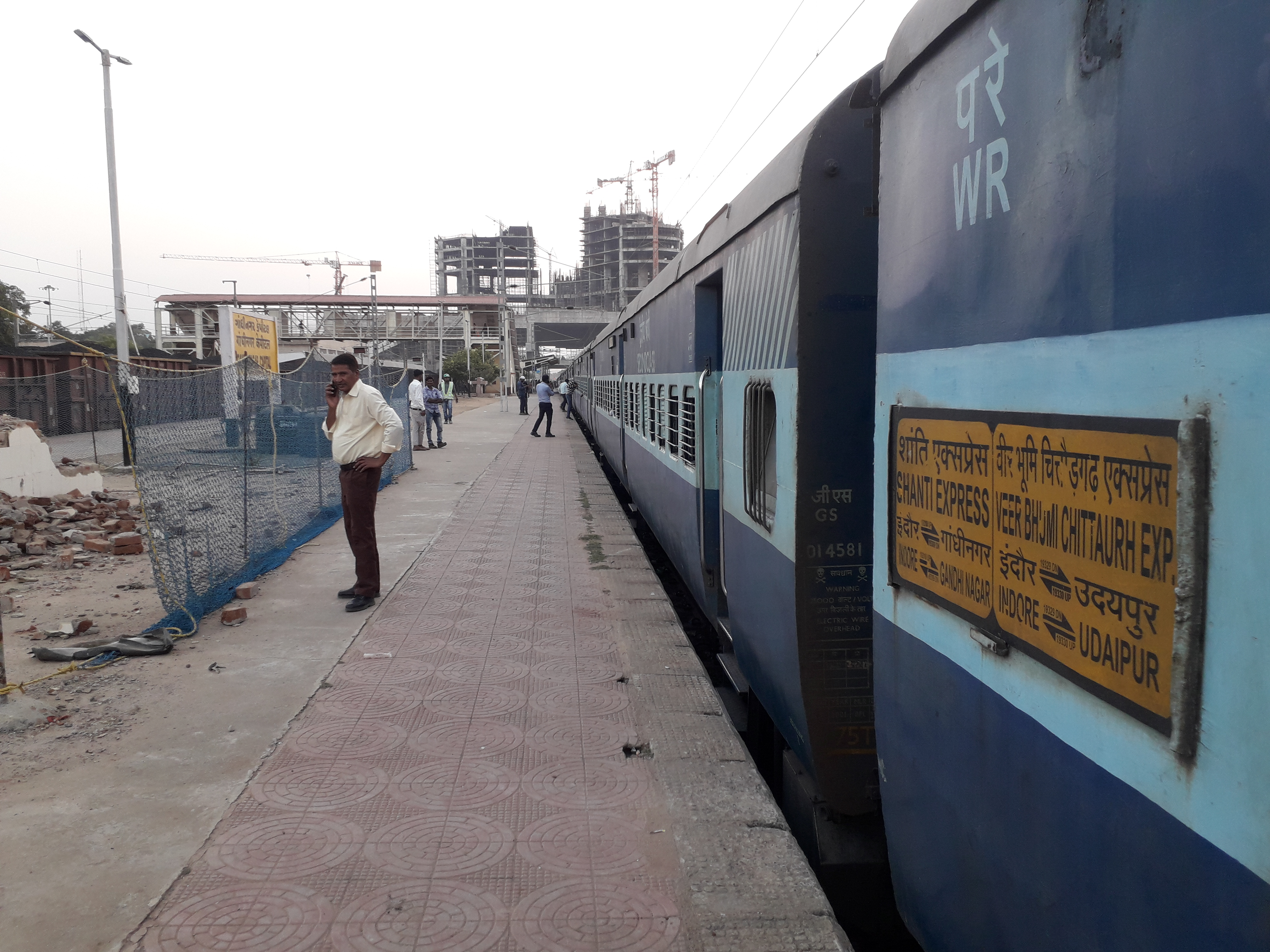
Shanti Express at Gandhinagar Capital railway station

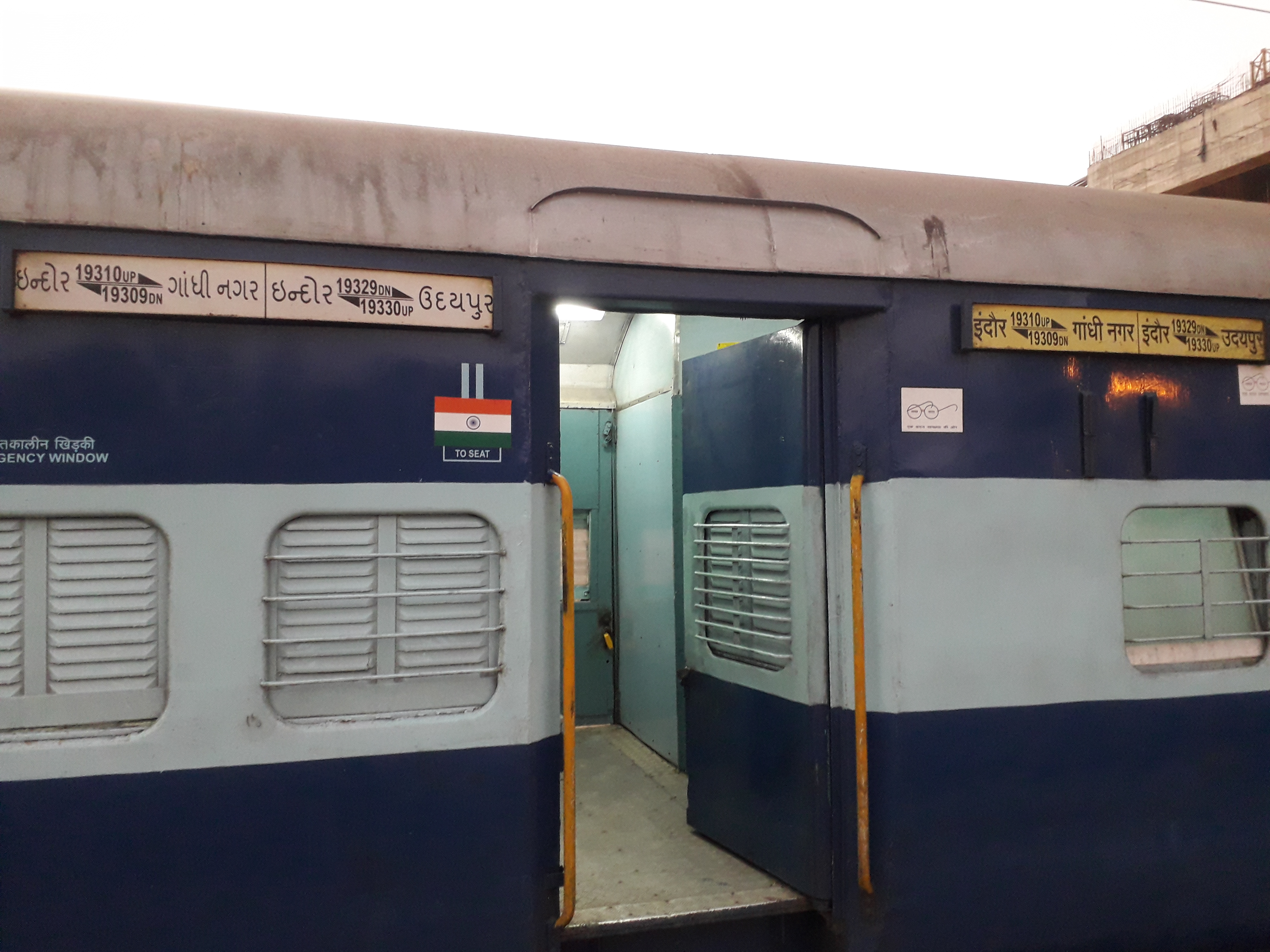
Shanti Express – General Coach

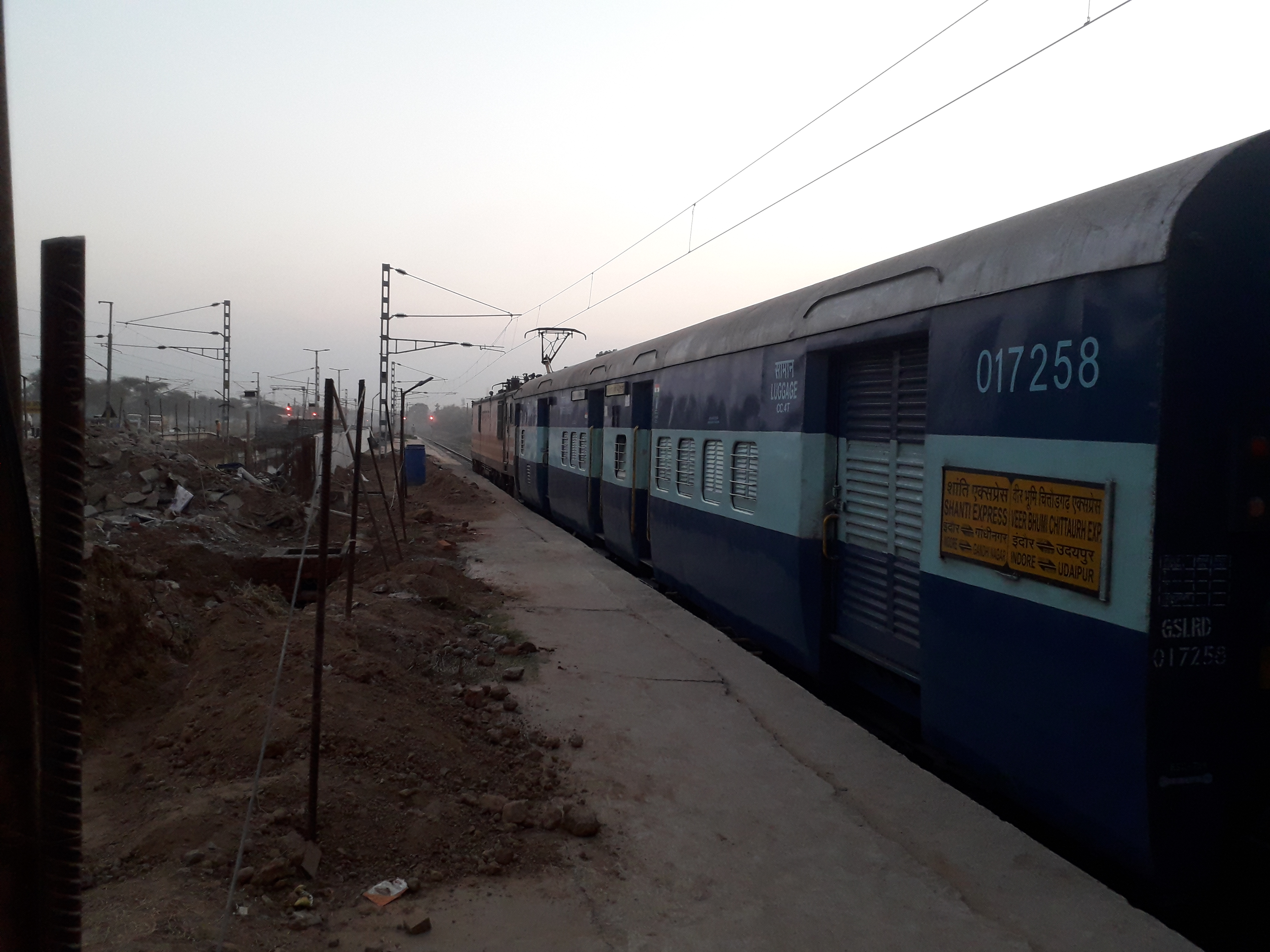
Shanti Express at Gandhinagar Capital railway station – SLR Coach

== Service ==
The 19309/Shanti Express has an average speed of 47 km/h and covers 570 km in 12 hrs 10 mins.

The 19310/Shanti Express has an average speed of 51 km/h and covers 570 km in 11 hrs 15 mins.

== Route & halts ==
The important halts of the train are :

- Indore Junction
- Dewas Junction
- Ujjain Junction
- Khachrod
- Nagda Junction
- Ratlam Junction
- Meghnagar
- Dahod
- Limkheda
- Godhra Junction
- Derol
- Chhayapuri (for Vadodara)
- Anand Junction
- Nadiad Junction
- Mahemadavad Kheda Road
- Maninagar
- Ahmedabad Junction
- Khodiyar
- Chandlodiya
- Sabarmati
- Gandhinagar Capital

== Schedule ==
Train number	Station code	Departure station	Departure time	Arrival station	Arrival time
19309	GNC	Gandhinagar Capital	18:20 PM	Indore Junction	06:30 AM
19310	INDB	Indore Junction	22:00 PM	Gandhinagar Capital	09:45 AM

== Traction ==
Both trains are hauled by a Vadodara Electric Loco Shed-based WAP-5 electric locomotives on its entire journey.

== See also ==
- Ahilyanagari Express
- Avantika Express
- Malwa Express
