= Arvindsinh Damsinh Rathod =

- Born: 20 September 1958 (age 66); Kalol, Panchmahal, Gujarat, India
- Occupation: Agriculture

Arvindsinh Damsinh Rathod was MLA from Kalol, Panchmahal Gujarat. He was belongs to Bharatiya Janata Party party. In 2007 He was elected as MLA from Kalol, Panchmahal.

== Career ==
President, Taluka Panchayat, Kalol, 2000-05.
