= Umbadiyu =

Indian seasonal dish

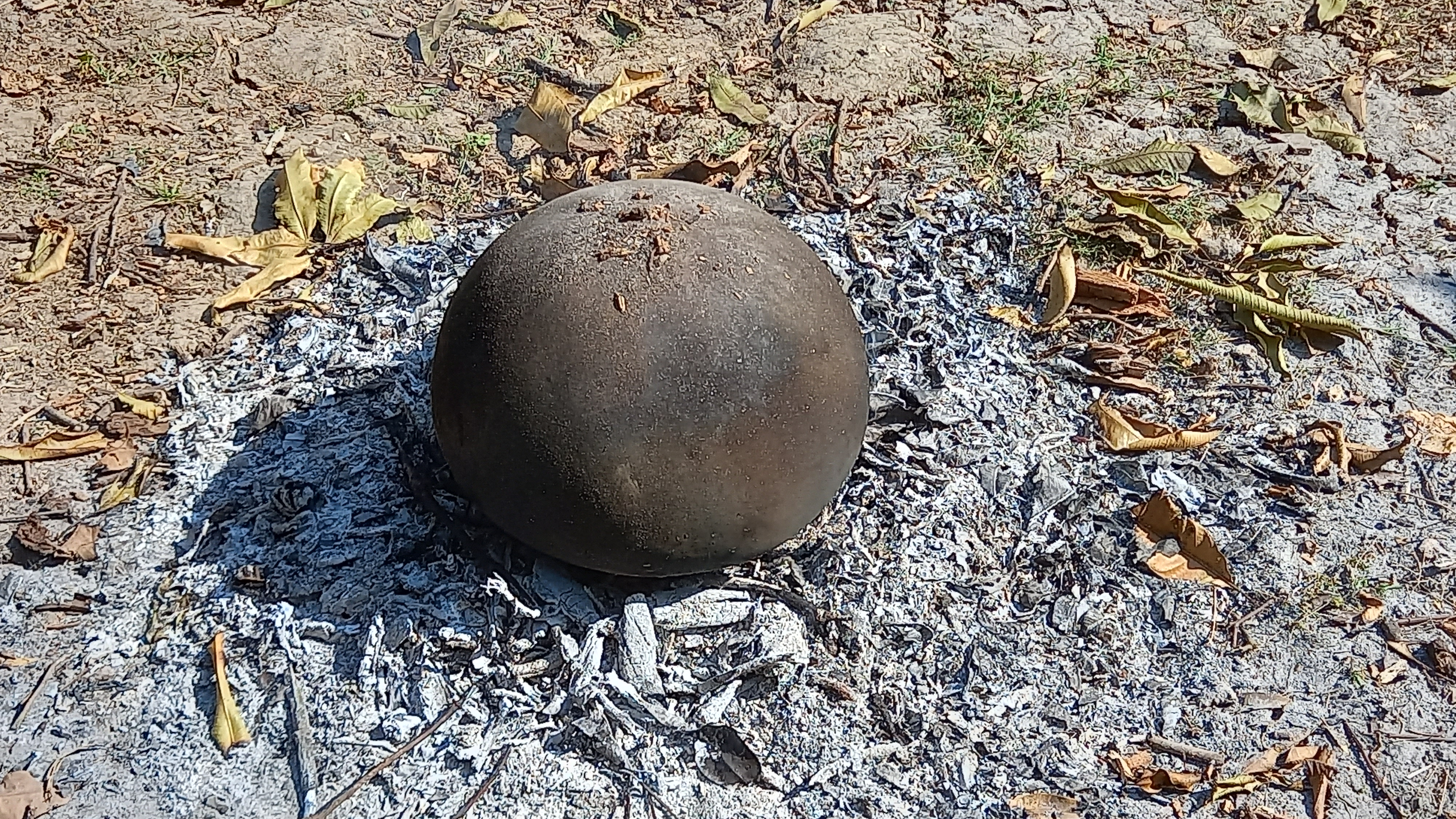
Umbadiyu being cooked in an upside down earthen pot

Umbadiyu or Ubadyu is local delicacy and seasonal dish from districts of South Gujarat Valsad. However mostly the dish is made in rural areas of Valsad or near National Highway 48 from Dungri City to Umargam. And also found in UT of Dadra and Nagar Haveli and Daman and Diu.

The dish is mostly eaten in winter due to availability of ingredients.

The common ingredients of the dish are, potatoes, green beans, purple yam and sweet potatoes. The dish unique for its fragrance and earthiness of kalar(Indian nettle) and Kamboi(Black honey shrub). The dish made in rounded earthen pot put upside down in fire.

The dish is called as 'Gujarati Barbeque' due to its smoky flavour.

The dish is often served with green chilly chutney and Chaas.

The dish was once mentioned in famous Hindi TV show Taarak Mehta Ka Ooltah Chashmah. An Umbadiyu brunch was organised by Jethalal.

== See also ==
- Indian cuisine
