= Lok Shakti Express =

Train in India

Lokshakti Express

Overview
- Service type: Express
- Locale: Maharashtra & Gujarat
- Current operator: Western Railway

Route
- Termini: Bandra Terminus (BDTS); Vadnagar (VDG)
- Stops: 22
- Distance travelled: 584 km (363 mi)
- Average journey time: 11 hours 10 minutes
- Service frequency: Daily
- Train number: 22927 / 22928

On-board services
- Classes: AC First Class, AC 2 Tier, AC 3 Tier, Sleeper Class, General Unreserved
- Seating arrangements: Yes
- Sleeping arrangements: Yes
- Catering facilities: On-board catering, E-catering
- Observation facilities: Large windows
- Baggage facilities: Available
- Other facilities: Below the seats

Technical
- Rolling stock: LHB coach
- Track gauge: 1,676 mm (5 ft 6 in)
- Operating speed: 54 km/h (34 mph) average including halts.

The 22927 / 22928 Lok Shakti Express is an express train belonging to Indian Railways that runs between Bandra Terminus and Vadnagar in India. It is a daily service.

It operates as train number 22927 from Bandra Terminus to Vadnagar and as train number 22928 in the reverse direction. Formerly run as Ahmedabad Janta Express the train name renamed to LokShakti means People's Power.

== Coaches ==
The Lok Shakti Express has 1 AC 1st Class cum AC 2 tier, 1 AC 2 tier, 4 AC 3 tier, 12 Sleeper class, 3 General Unreserved, 2 Seating cum Luggage Rake coaches. As with most train services in India, Coach Composition may be amended at the discretion of Indian Railways depending on demand.

== Route and halts ==
- Bandra Terminus
- Andheri
- Borivali
- Virar
- Saphale
- Palghar
- Boisar
- Dahanu Road
- Umargam Road
- Vapi
- Valsad
- Bilimora Junction
- Navsari
- Surat
- Kosamba Junction
- Bharuch Junction
- Vadodara Junction
- Anand Junction
- Nadiad Junction
- Mahemadavad Kheda Road
- Maninagar
- Ahmedabad Junction
- Mahesana Junction
- Vadnagar

== Service ==
The Lok Shakti Express is a daily train service and covers the distance of 584 kilometres in 11 hours 10 mins in both direction (54 km/h).

== Traction ==
Dual traction WCAM 1 locomotives would haul the train all the way between Bandra Terminus and Ahmedabad.

After Western Railway switched over to AC system in February 2012, it is hauled by a Vadodara Loco Shed-based WAP-7 electric locomotive on its entire journey.

== Gallery ==
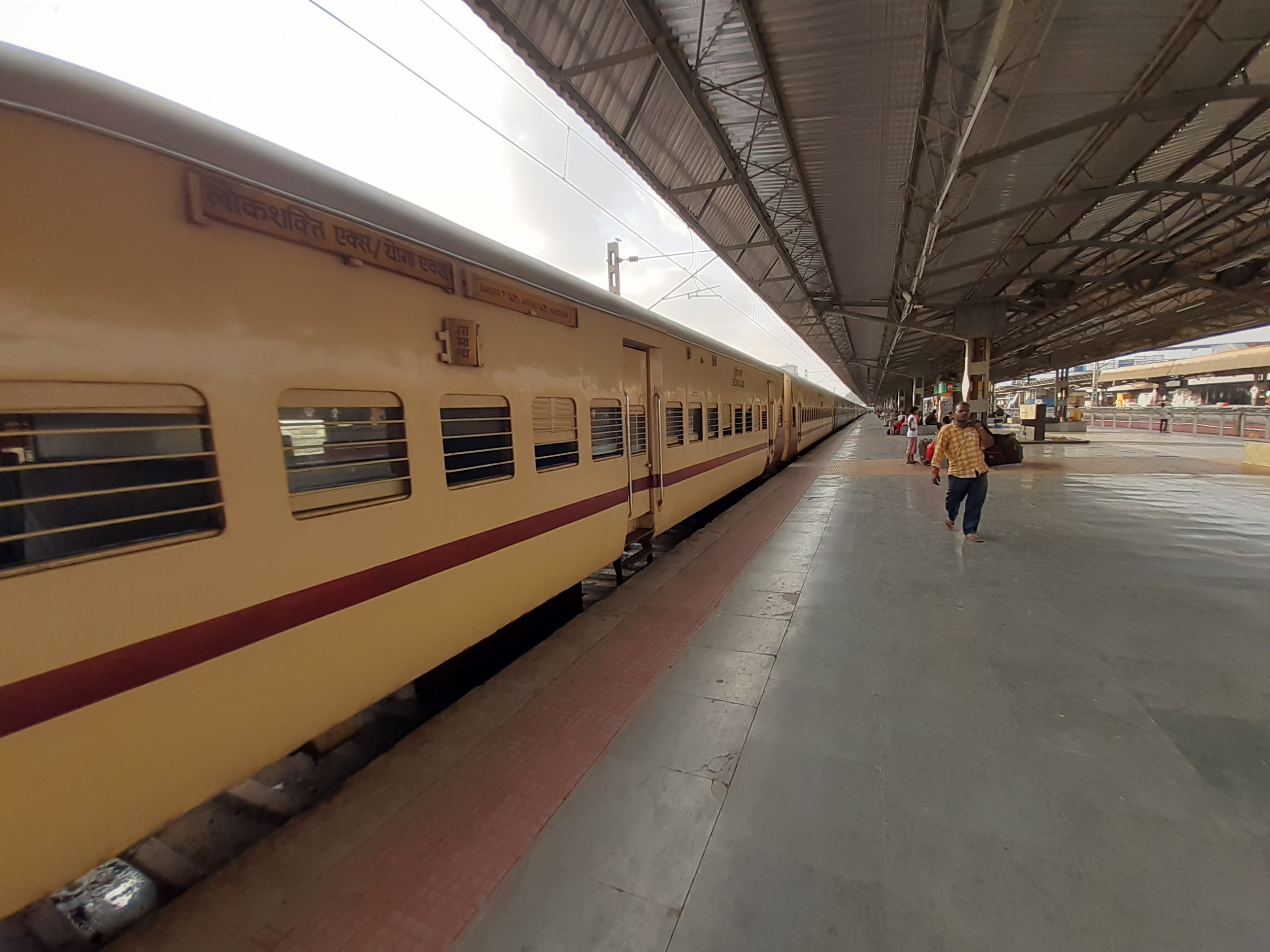
22927 Lok Shakti Express at Bandra Terminus

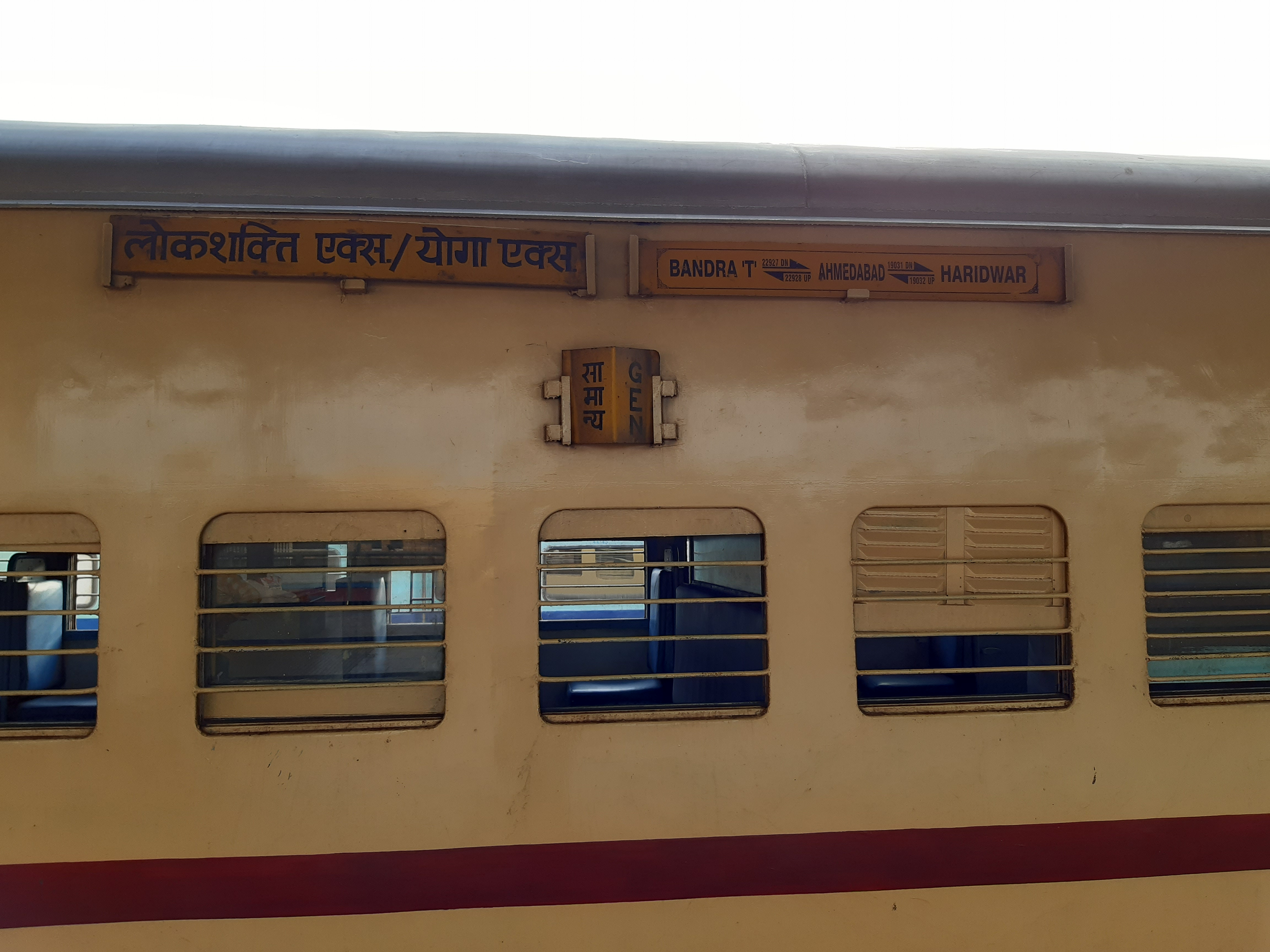
22927 Lok Shakti Express - General/Unreserved coach

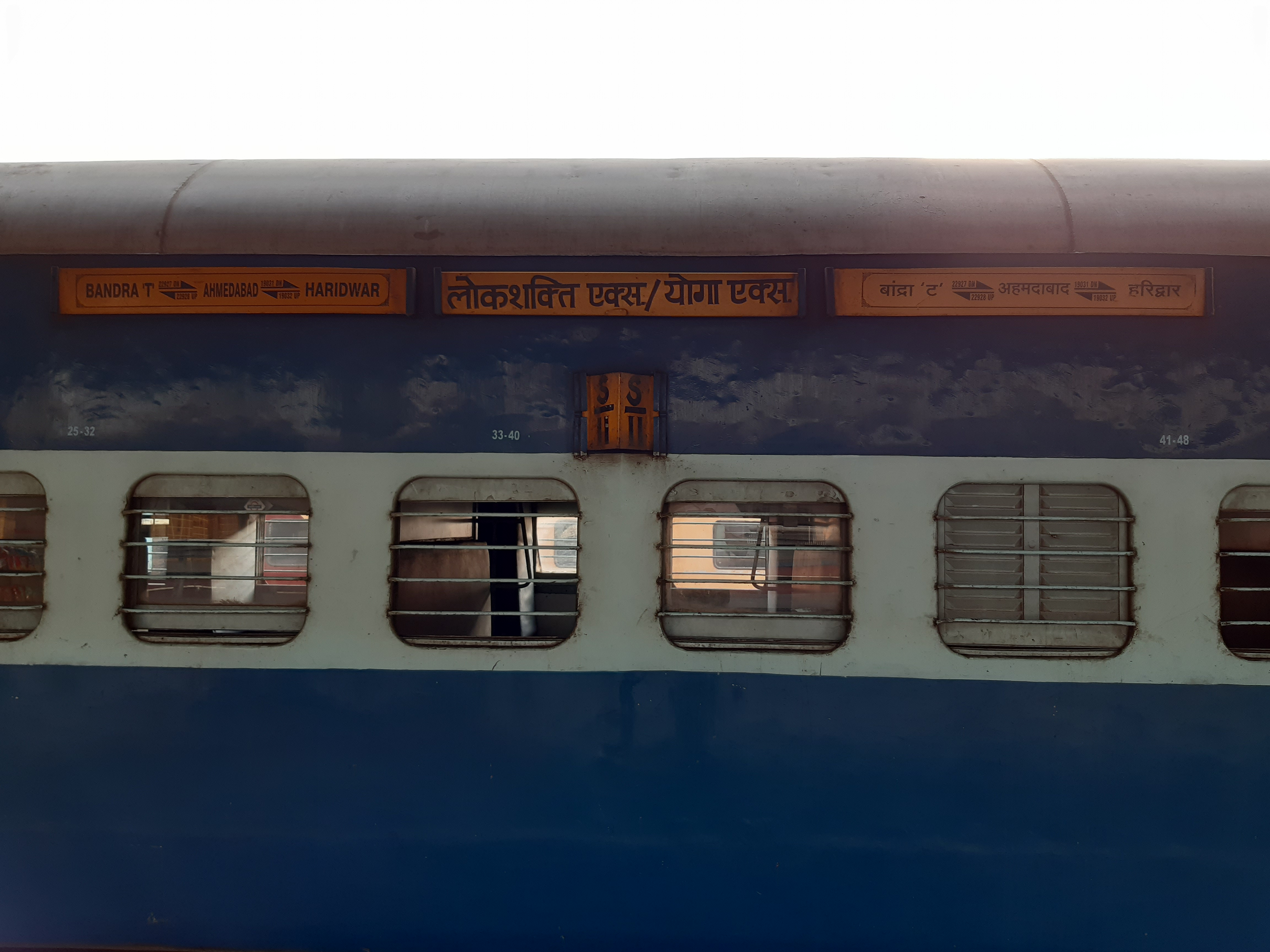
22927 Lok Shakti Express - Sleeper Class coach

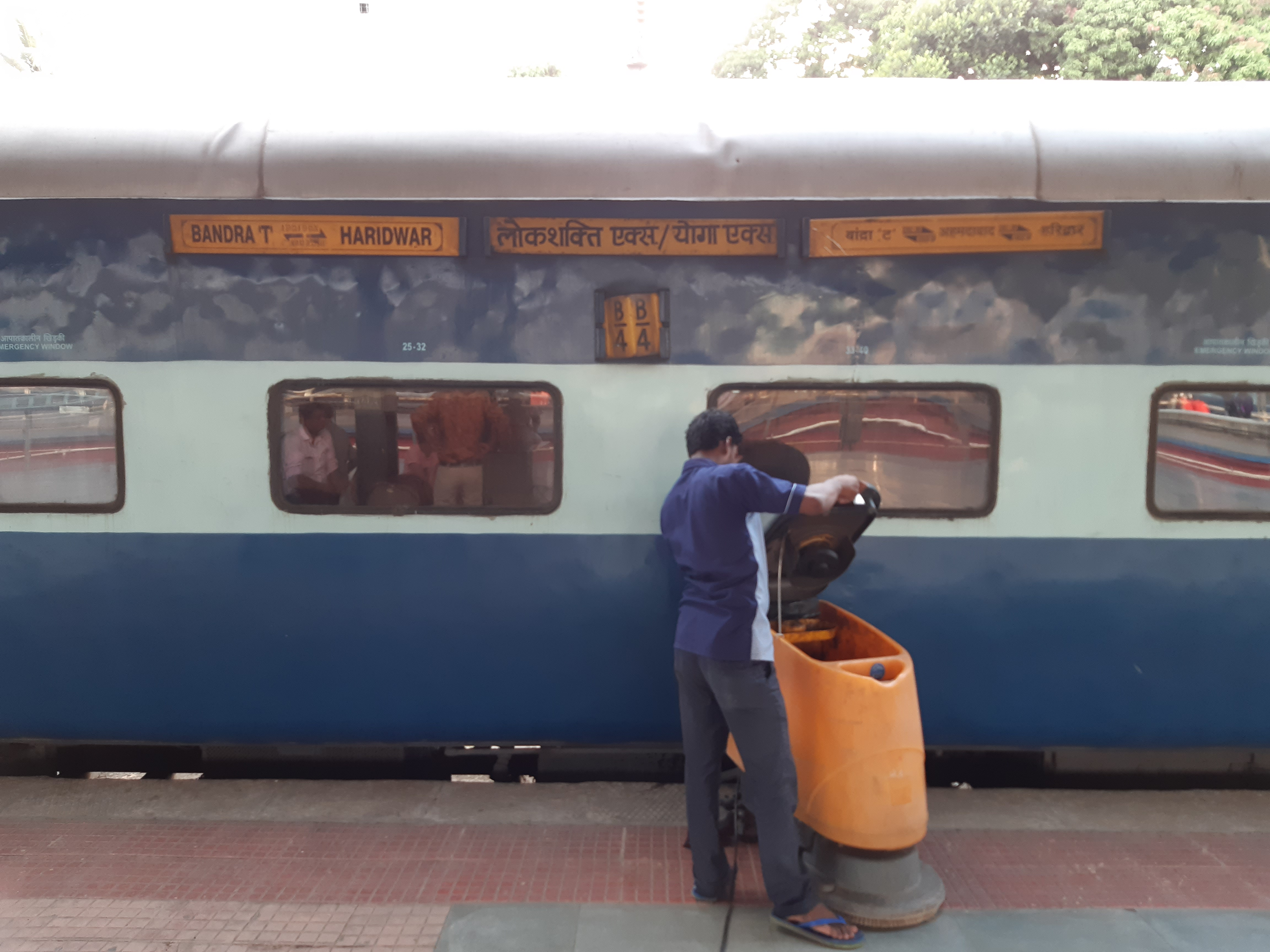
22927 Lok Shakti Express - AC 3 tier coach

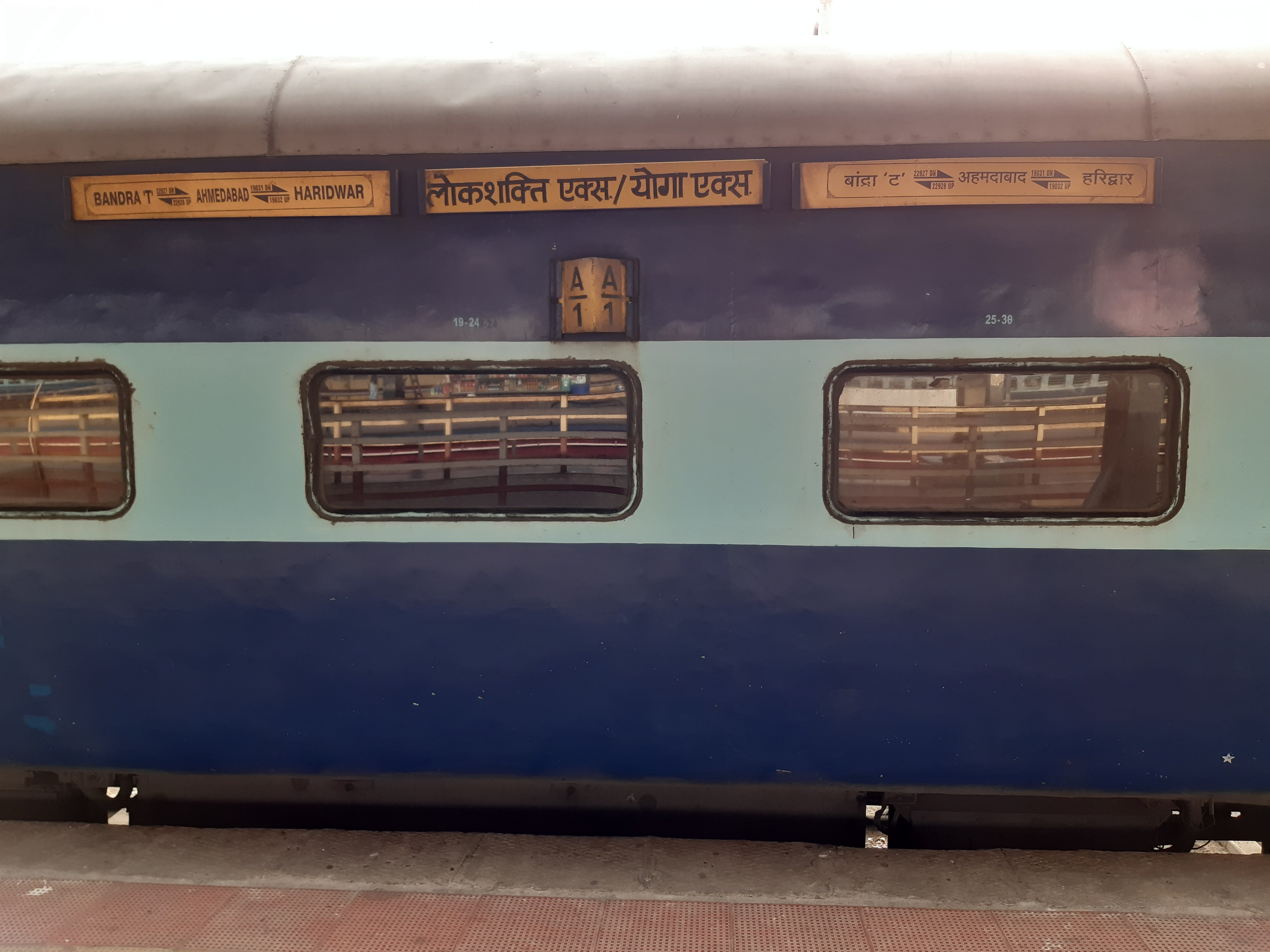
22927 Lok Shakti Express - AC 2 tier coach

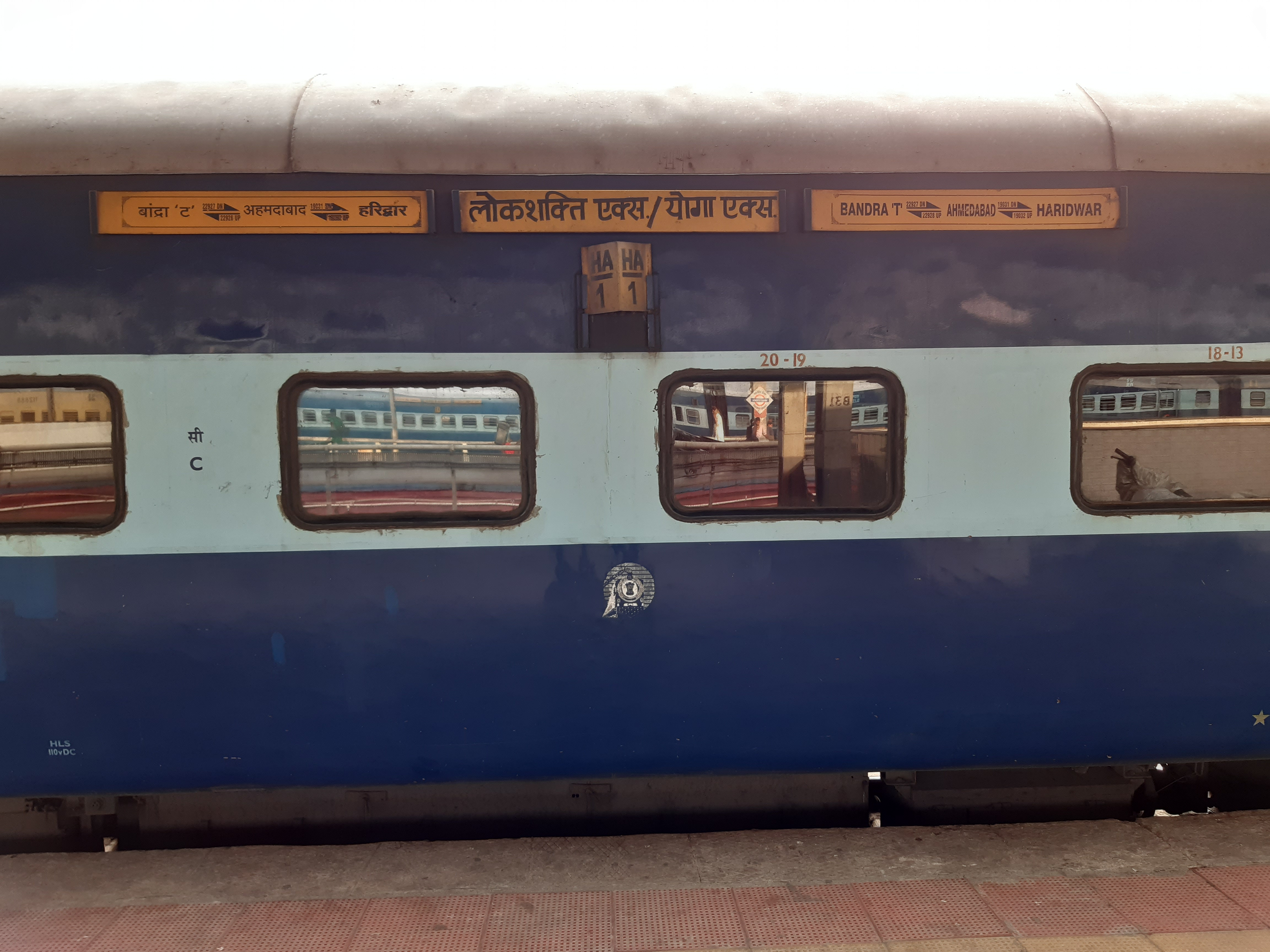
22927 Lok Shakti Express - AC 1st Class cum AC 2 tier coach
