= Champaner Road railway station =

Railway station in Gujarat, India

General information
- Location: Gujarat State Highway 5, Kalol, Gujarat; India
- Coordinates: 22.5417°N 73.3932°E
- Elevation: 87 metres (285 ft)
- System: Indian Railways station
- Owner: Indian Railways
- Operator: Western Railway
- Line: Mathura–Vadodara section
- Platforms: 3
- Tracks: 6
- Connections: Auto stand

Construction
- Structure type: Standard (on-ground station)
- Parking: No
- Cycle facilities: No

Other information
- Status: Functioning
- Station code: CPN
- Zone(s): Western Railway
- Division(s): Vadodara

Services
Preceding station	Indian Railways	Following station
Lotana towards ?	Western Railway zone Mathura–Vadodara section	Bakrol towards ?
Location

Champaner Road railway station is a small railway station in Panchmahal district, Gujarat. Its code is CPN. It serves Champaner village. The station consists of three platforms.

== Trains ==
The following trains run from Champaner Road railway station:

- Vadodara–Kota Passenger
- Vadodara–Dahod MEMU
- Bandra Terminus-Dehradun Express
- Vadodara–Godhra MEMU
