= Valsad–Vadnagar Intercity Superfast Express =

Train in India

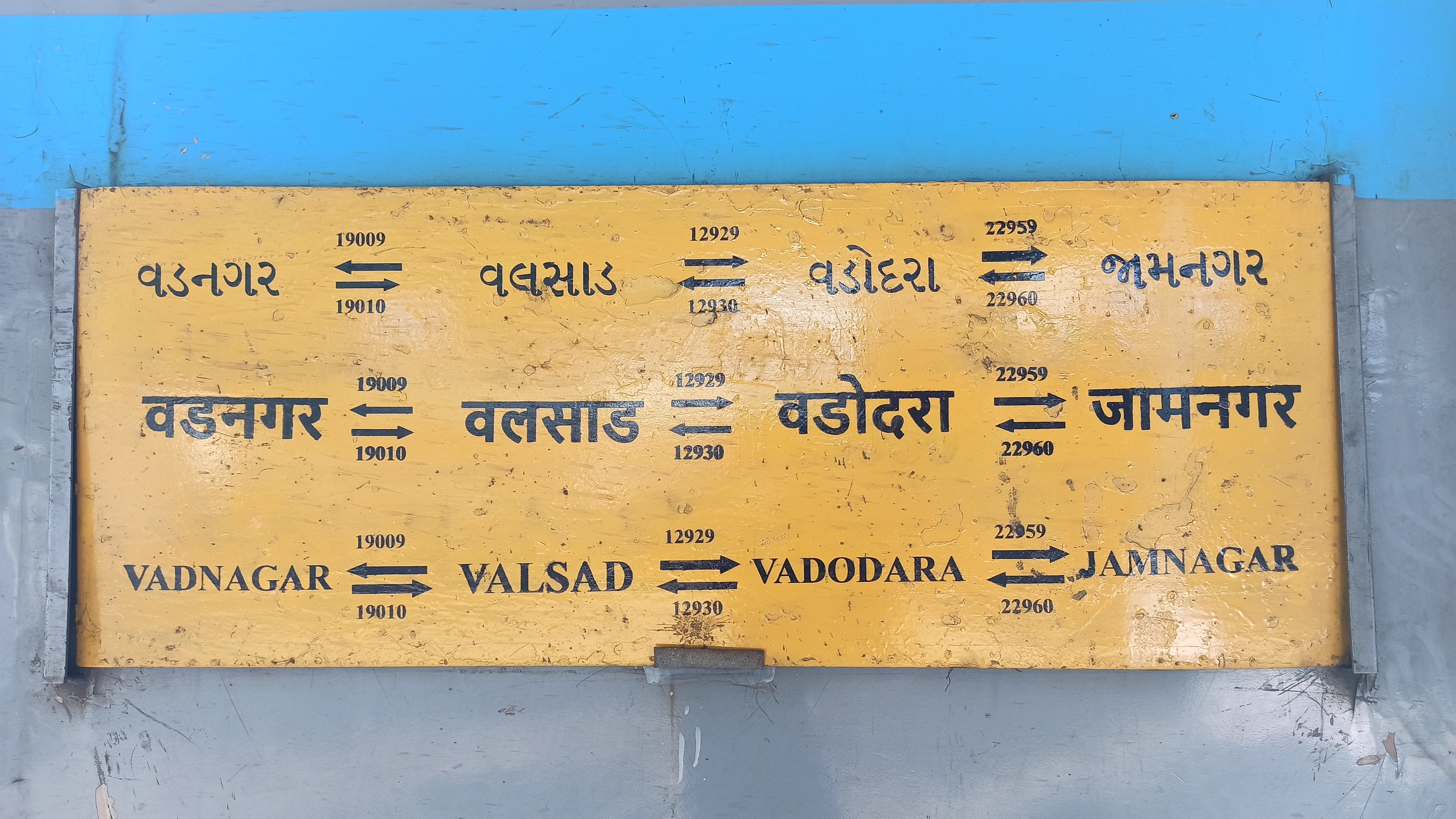

Overview
- Service type: Intercity Superfast Express
- Status: Daily
- Locale: Gujarat
- First service: 3 November 2022; 3 years ago
- Current operator: Western Railway

Route
- Termini: Valsad (BL); Vadnagar (VDG)
- Stops: 13
- Distance travelled: 424 km (263 mi)
- Average journey time: 7 hours 15 minutes
- Service frequency: Daily
- Train number: 20959 / 20960

On-board services
- Classes: AC Chair Car, Second Class Seating, General Unreserved
- Seating arrangements: Yes
- Sleeping arrangements: No
- Auto-rack arrangements: Overhead racks
- Catering facilities: No
- Observation facilities: Large windows
- Baggage facilities: Available
- Other facilities: Below the seats

Technical
- Rolling stock: LHB coach
- Track gauge: 1,676 mm (5 ft 6 in)
- Operating speed: 58 km/h (36 mph) average including halts.

The 20959 / 20960 Valsad–Vadnagar Intercity Superfast Express is a superfast express train of the Indian Railways connecting Valsad and Vadnagar of Gujarat .

Valsad–Vadnagar Intercity Superfast Express was inaugurated by Minister of State for Railways and Textiles, Darshana Jardosh from 3 November 2022 at Surat railway station.

== Service ==
- 20959/Valsad–Vadnagar Intercity Superfast Express has an average speed of 60 km/h and covers 424 km in 7 hrs.
- 20960/Vadnagar–Valsad Intercity Superfast Express has an average speed of 56 km/h and covers 424 km in 7 hrs 35 mins.

== Route & halts ==
The important halts of the train are:

- Valsad
- Bilimora Junction
- Navsari
- Surat
- Bharuch Junction
- Vadodara Junction
- Anand Junction
- Nadiad Junction
- Ahmedabad Junction
- Gandhinagar Capital
- Kalol Junction
- Ambliyasan Junction
- Mahesana Junction
- Visnagar
- Vadnagar

== Traction ==
It is hauled by a Vadodara Loco Shed based WAP-7 electric locomotive from end to end.

== Rake sharing ==
The train shares its rake with;

- 12929/12930 Valsad–Vadodara Intercity Superfast Express
- 22959/22960 Vadodara–Jamnagar Intercity Superfast Express
- 19011/19012 Valsad–Dahod Intercity Express

== Gallery ==
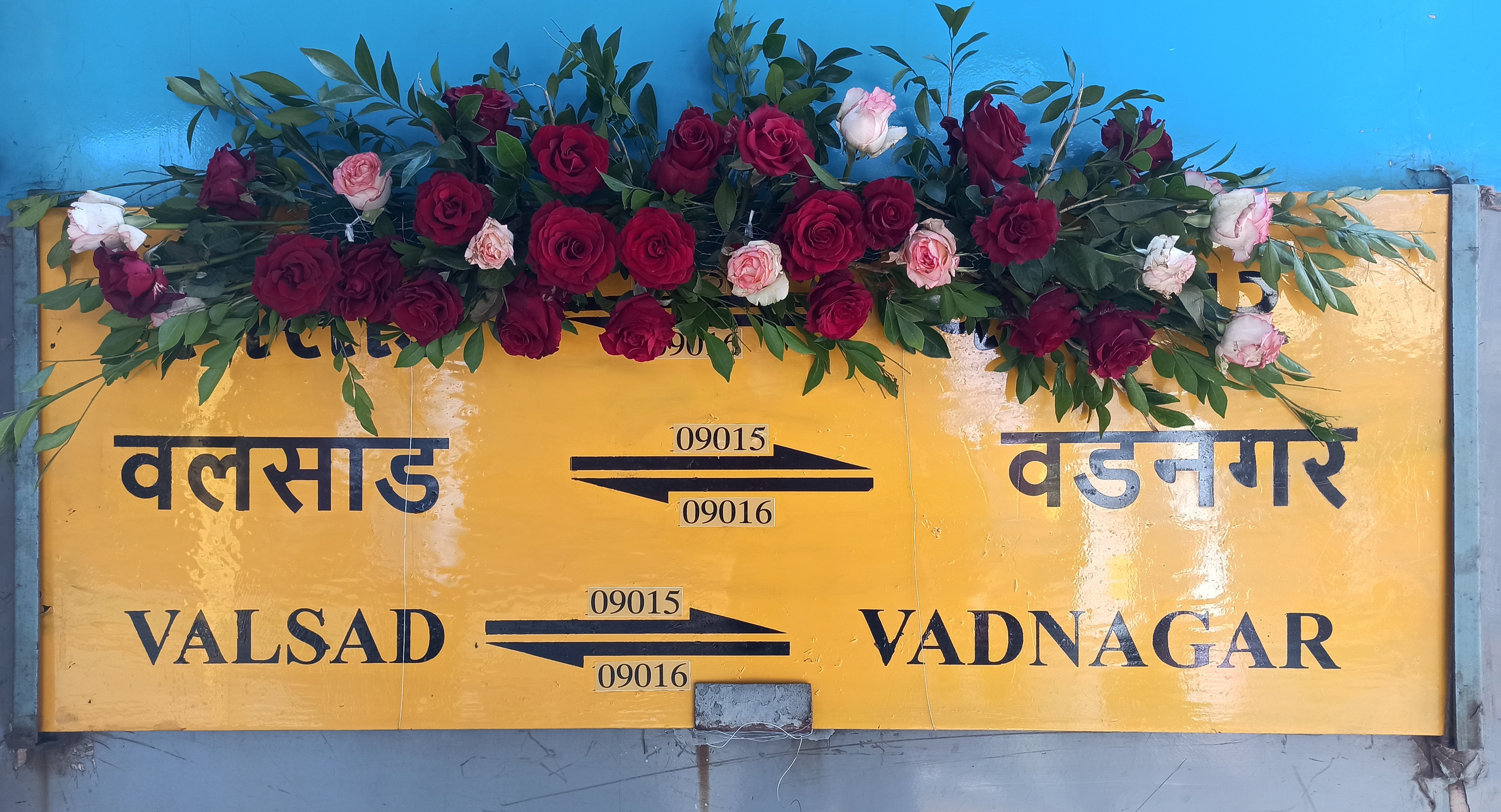
Vadnagar Intercity Express Inaugural Board

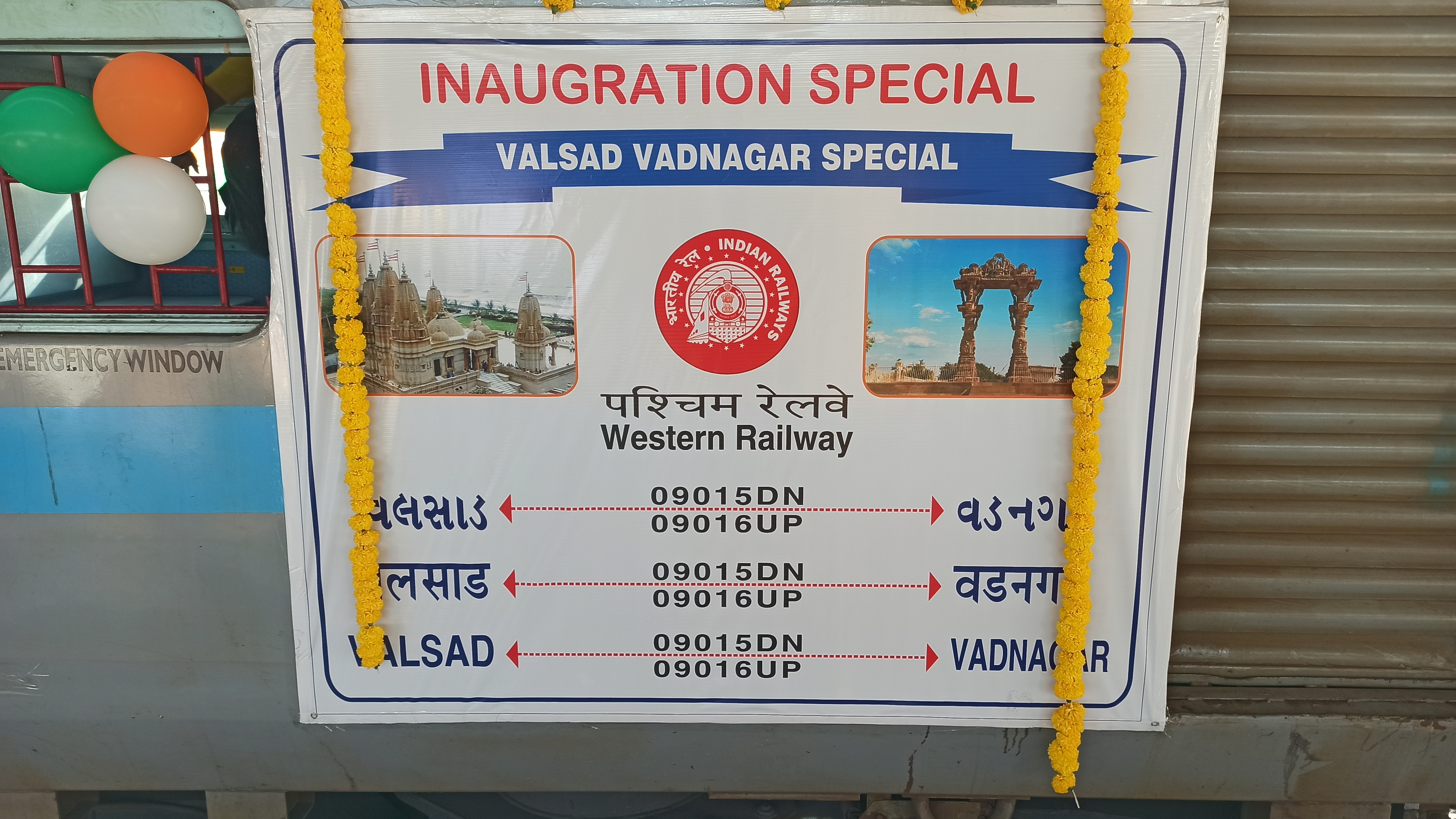
Vadnagar Intercity Express Inaugural Board

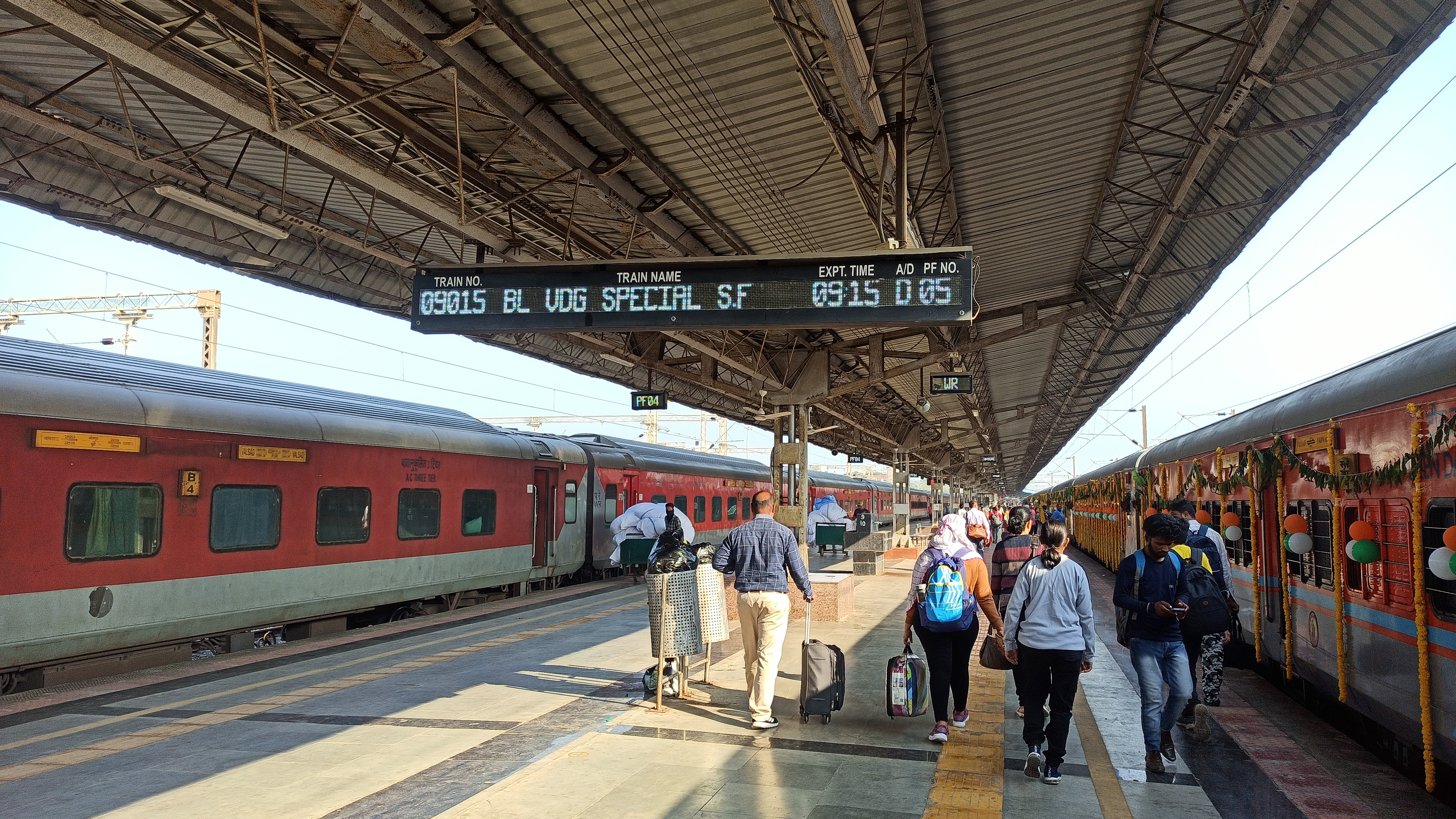
Vadnagar Intercity Express Special at PF 5

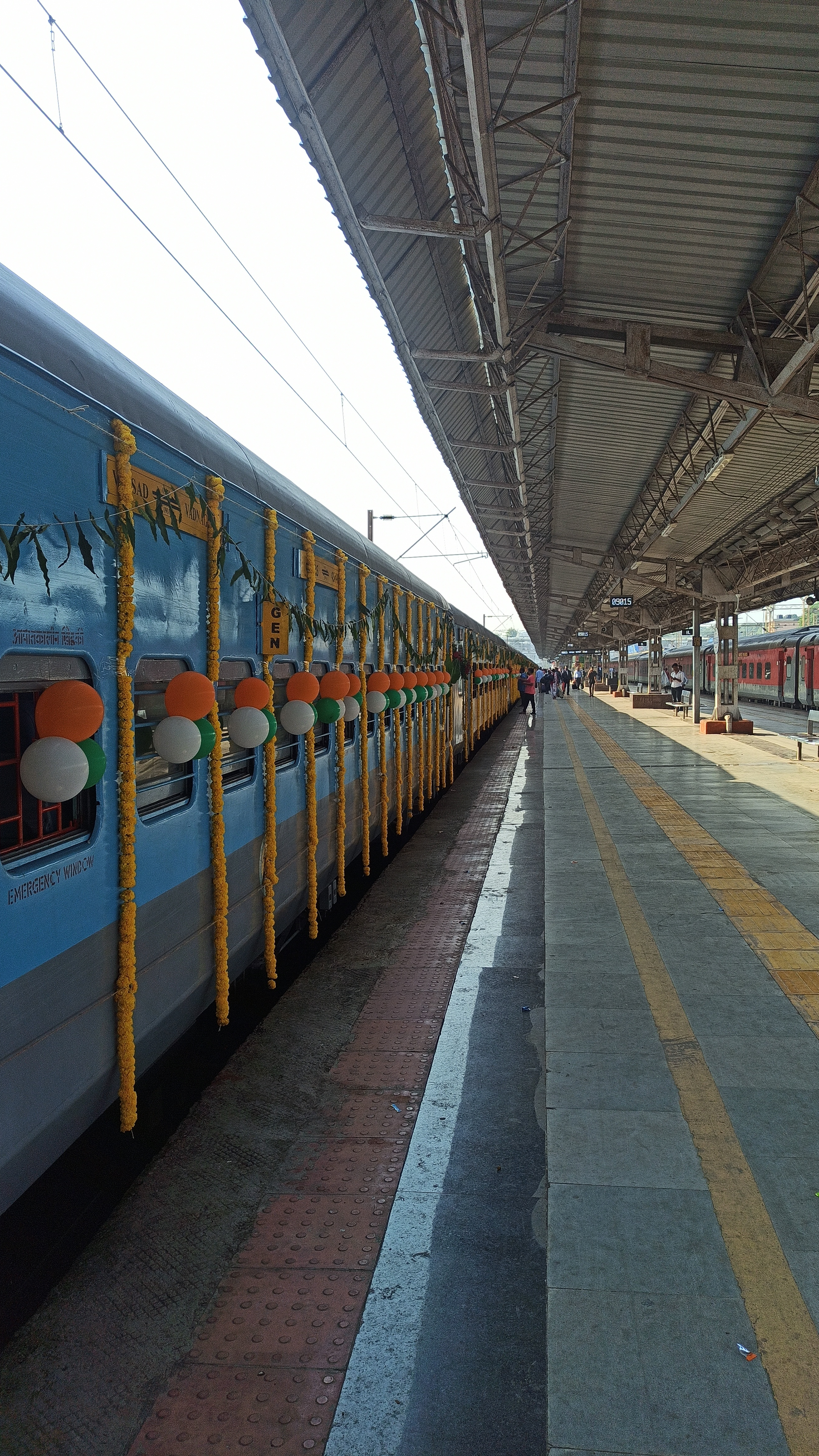
Vadnagar Intercity Express Special at PF 5

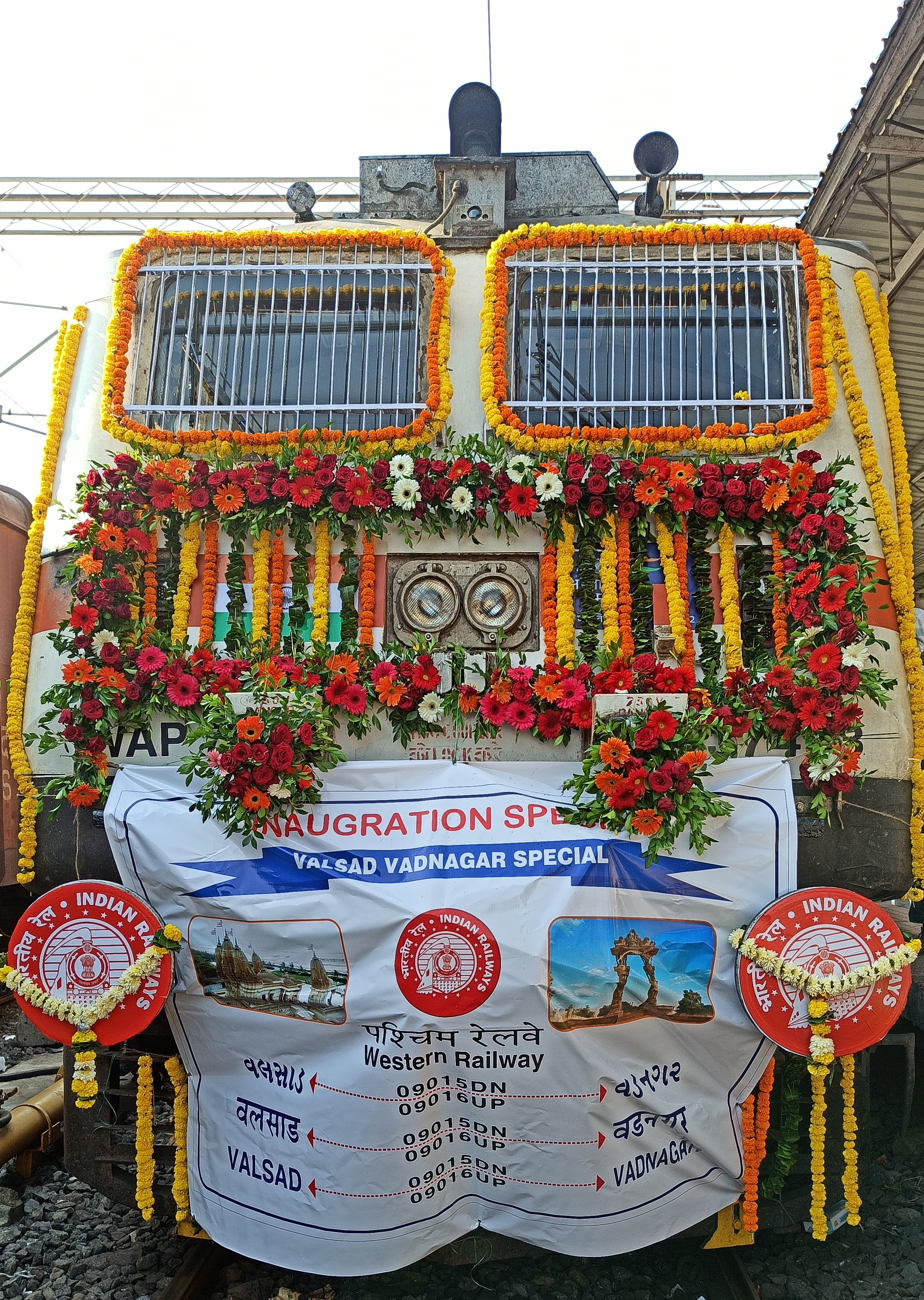
Vadnagar Intercity Express Special Engine
