= Samlaya =

- Village
- Location in Gujarat, India Samlaya (India)
- Coordinates: 22.485608°N 73.301572°E
- Country: India
- State: Gujarat
- District: Vadodara

Population (2011)
  - Total: 2,232

Languages
  - Official: Gujarati, Hindi
- Time zone: UTC+5:30 (IST)
- PIN: 391520
- Vehicle registration: GJ-06
- Website: gujaratindia.com

Samlaya is a large village in Vadodara district in the Indian state of Gujarat.

== Demographics ==
As of 2011 India census, Samlaya had a population of 2,232. Males constitute 50.90% of the population and females 49.10%. Samlaya has an average literacy rate of 74.50%: male literacy is 87.64%, and female literacy is 60.84%. In Samlaya, 13.22% of the population is under 6 years of age.

== Transport ==
=== Railway ===
Samlaya Junction railway station is located on the Western Railway Mumbai – Delhi Segment. It is 47 km from Godhra, 26 km from Vadodara.
