= Khodiyar railway station =

Railway station in Gujarat, India

Khodiyar

General information
- Location: Khodiyar, Ahmedabad, Gujarat; India
- Coordinates: 23.155651°N 72.547803°E
- Elevation: 65 metres (213 ft)
- System: Indian Railway Station
- Owner: Ministry of Railways, Indian Railways
- Operator: Western Railway
- Lines: Ahmedabad–Delhi main line Jaipur–Ahmedabad line Kalol - Khodiyar line
- Platforms: 2
- Tracks: 2

Construction
- Structure type: Ground
- Parking: Yes

Other information
- Status: Functioning
- Station code: KHDB
- Zone(s): Western Railway
- Division(s): Ahmedabad
Location
- Location within Ahmedabad Location within Gujarat Location within India

Khodiyar railway station is a small railway station on the Western Railway network in suburbs of Ahmedabad in the state of Gujarat, India. Khodiyar railway station is 11 km from Sabarmati Junction railway station. Passenger, MEMU and Express trains halt here.

== Nearby stations ==
Chandlodiya and Sabarmati Junction are nearest railway stations towards Ahmedabad Junction, whereas Saij Sertha Road is nearest railway station towards Palanpur Junction.

== Trains ==
- Gandhinagar Capital - Indore Shanti Express

== See also ==
- Ahmedabad district
