= Ujjain–Nagda MEMU =

Passenger train of the Indian Railways

Overview
- Service type: MEMU
- Locale: Madhya Pradesh
- Current operator: Western Railway

Route
- Termini: Ujjain Junction (UJN); Nagda Junction (ND)
- Stops: 6
- Distance travelled: 56 km (35 mi)
- Average journey time: 1h 25m
- Service frequency: Daily (Note: Runs seven days in a week for every direction.)
- Train number: 69185UP / 69186DN

On-board services
- Class: Unreserved
- Seating arrangements: Yes
- Sleeping arrangements: No
- Catering facilities: No
- Entertainment facilities: No
- Baggage facilities: No

Technical
- Rolling stock: 1
- Track gauge: 5 ft 6 in (1,676 mm)
- Operating speed: 39 km/h (24 mph) average with halts

Ujjain–Nagda MEMU is a passenger train of the Indian Railways, which runs between Ujjain Junction railway station and Nagda Junction railway station, both within Madhya Pradesh.

== Average speed and frequency ==
The train runs with an average speed of 39 km/h and completes 56 km in 1h 25m. The trains which runs on a daily basis.

== Route and halts ==
The important halts of the train are:

- Ujjain Junction
- Naikheri
- Aslaoda
- Palsora Makrawa
- Unhel
- Piploda Bagla
- Bhatisuda
- Nagda Junction

== See also ==
- Ujjain Junction railway station
- Nagda Junction railway station
- Dahod–Ratlam MEMU
- Vadodara–Dahod MEMU
