= Joravasan railway station =

Railway station in Gujarat

General information
- Location: Joravasan, Navsari district, Gujarat; India
- Coordinates: 20°43′50″N 72°57′58″E
- System: Indian Railways station
- Owner: Ministry of Railways, Indian Railways
- Operator: Western Railway
- Lines: New Delhi–Mumbai main line Ahmedabad–Mumbai main line
- Platforms: 2
- Tracks: 2

Construction
- Structure type: Ground
- Parking: No

Other information
- Status: Functioning
- Station code: JRS
- Zone(s): Western Railway
- Division(s): Mumbai WR

Services
Preceding station	Indian Railways	Following station
Bilimora Junction towards ?	New Delhi–Mumbai main line	Dungri towards ?
Location
- Location within India Location within Gujarat

Joravasan railway station is a small railway station on the Western Railway network in the state of Gujarat, India. Joravasan railway station is 14 km away from Valsad railway station. Passenger and MEMU trains halt here.

== See also ==
- Navsari district
