= Bilimora Junction railway station =

Railway station in Gujarat, India

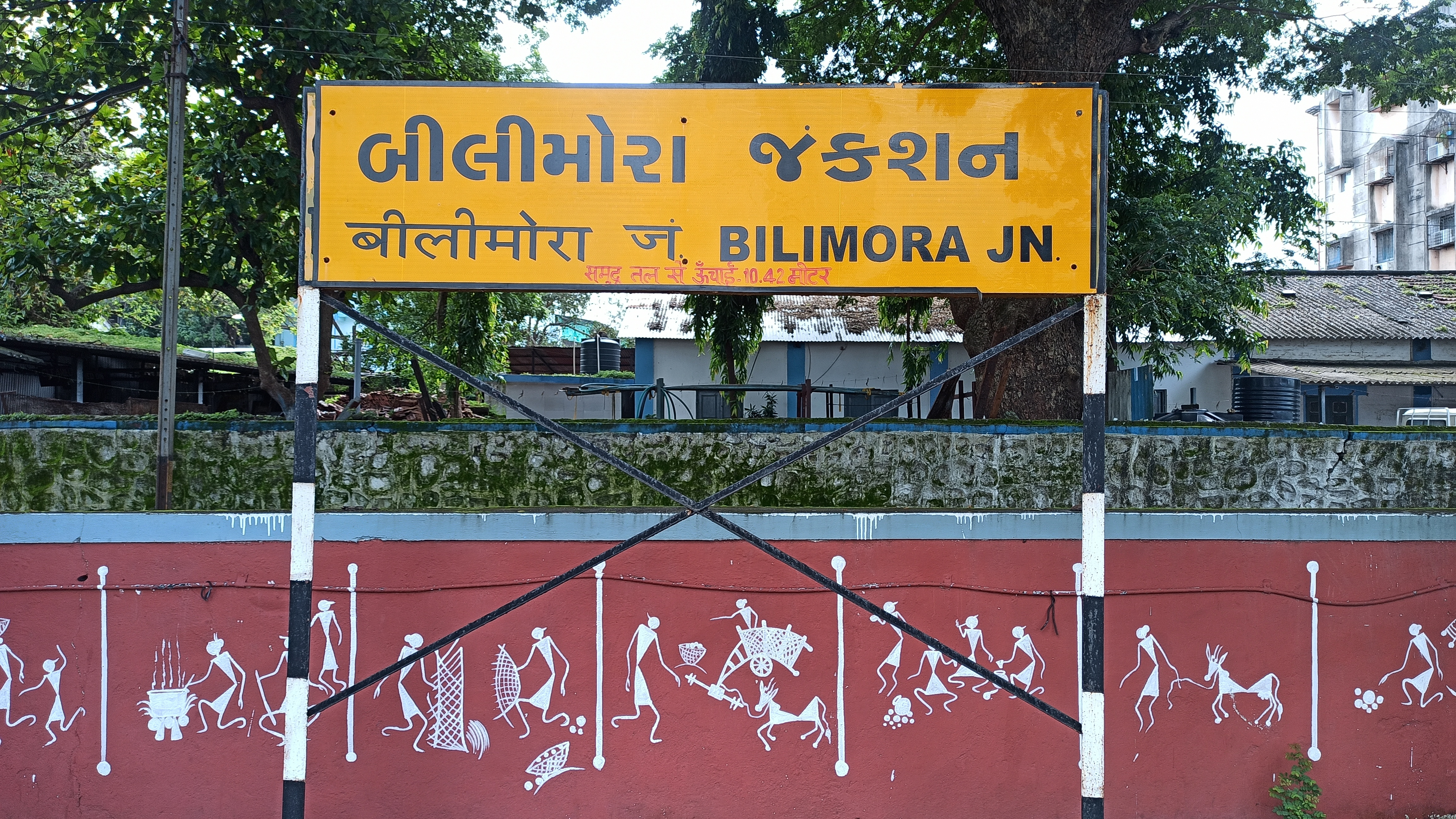

General information
- Location: Bilimora, Gujarat; India
- Coordinates: 20°46′00″N 72°58′12″E
- Elevation: 11 metres (36 ft)
- System: Indian Railways station
- Owner: Indian Railways
- Operator: Western Railway
- Lines: New Delhi–Mumbai main line Ahmedabad–Mumbai main line Bilimora–Waghai section
- Platforms: 5
- Tracks: 8
- Connections: Auto stand

Construction
- Structure type: Standard (on ground station)
- Parking: No
- Cycle facilities: No

Other information
- Status: Functioning
- Station code: BIM
- Zone(s): Western Railway
- Division(s): Mumbai WR
- Classification: NSG4

History
- Rebuilt: 2016

Services
Preceding station	Indian Railways	Following station
Amalsad towards ?	New Delhi–Mumbai main line	Joravasan towards ?
Location
- Location within India Location within Gujarat

Bilimora Junction railway station is a small railway station in Navsari district, Gujarat, India. Its code is BIM. It serves the city of Bilimora. The station consists of five platforms. The platforms are not well sheltered. It lacks many facilities including water and sanitation. Passenger, Express and Superfast trains halt here.

Bilimora is a junction railway station in the Mumbai division line of the Western Railway, from which a narrow-gauge line separates from the broad-gauge line to arrive at Waghai in the Dang district. It is said to be that this narrow-gauge line is to be converted into broad gauge and will be extended up to Manmad. Bilimora will be well connected through Maharashtra; the survey has been done and the project is to be evaluated for estimate. The town of Chikhli is about 10 km to the east, which is on National Highway 48.

== Trains ==
The following trains halt at Bilimora Junction railway station in both directions:

- 19033/34 Valsad–Ahmedabad Gujarat Queen Express
- 12929/30 Valsad–Vadodara Intercity Superfast Express
- 22953/54 Mumbai Central–Ahmedabad Gujarat Superfast Express
- 12935/36 Bandra Terminus–Surat Intercity Superfast Express
- 19015/16 Dadar–Porbandar Saurashtra Express
- 22929/30 Dahanu Road–Vadodara Superfast Express
- 19019/20 Bandra Terminus-Haridwar Express
- 20907/08 Dadar–Bhuj Sayajinagari Superfast Express
- 12921/22 Mumbai Central–Surat Flying Ranee Superfast Express
- 22927 Bandra Terminus–Ahmedabad Lok Shakti Superfast Express
- 20959/60 Valsad-Vadnagar Intercity Superfast Express
- 19217/18 Bandra Terminus-Veraval Saurashtra Janta Express
- 19011/12 Valsad-Dahod Intercity Express

== Gallery ==
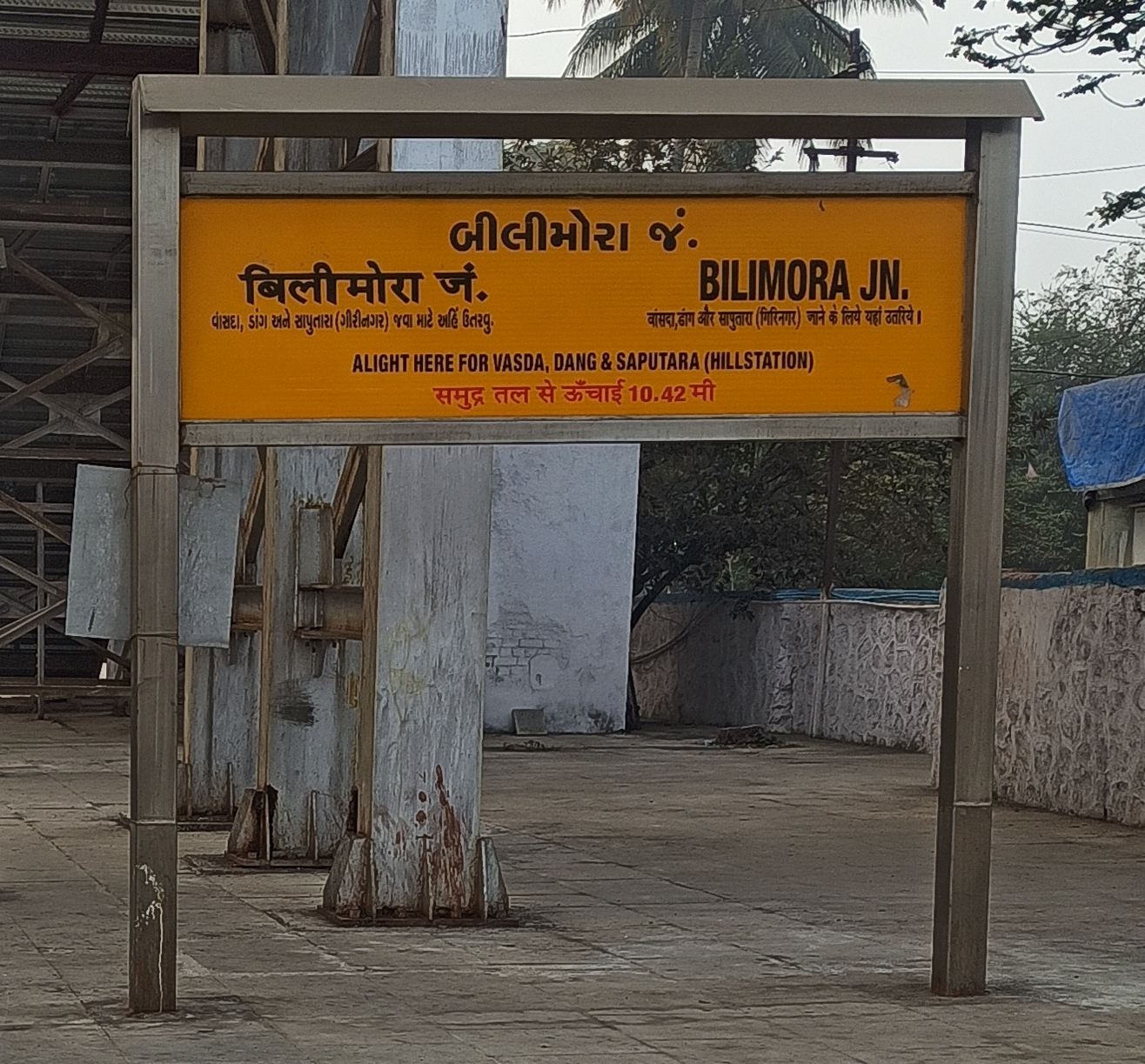
Bilimora Junction Platform Board

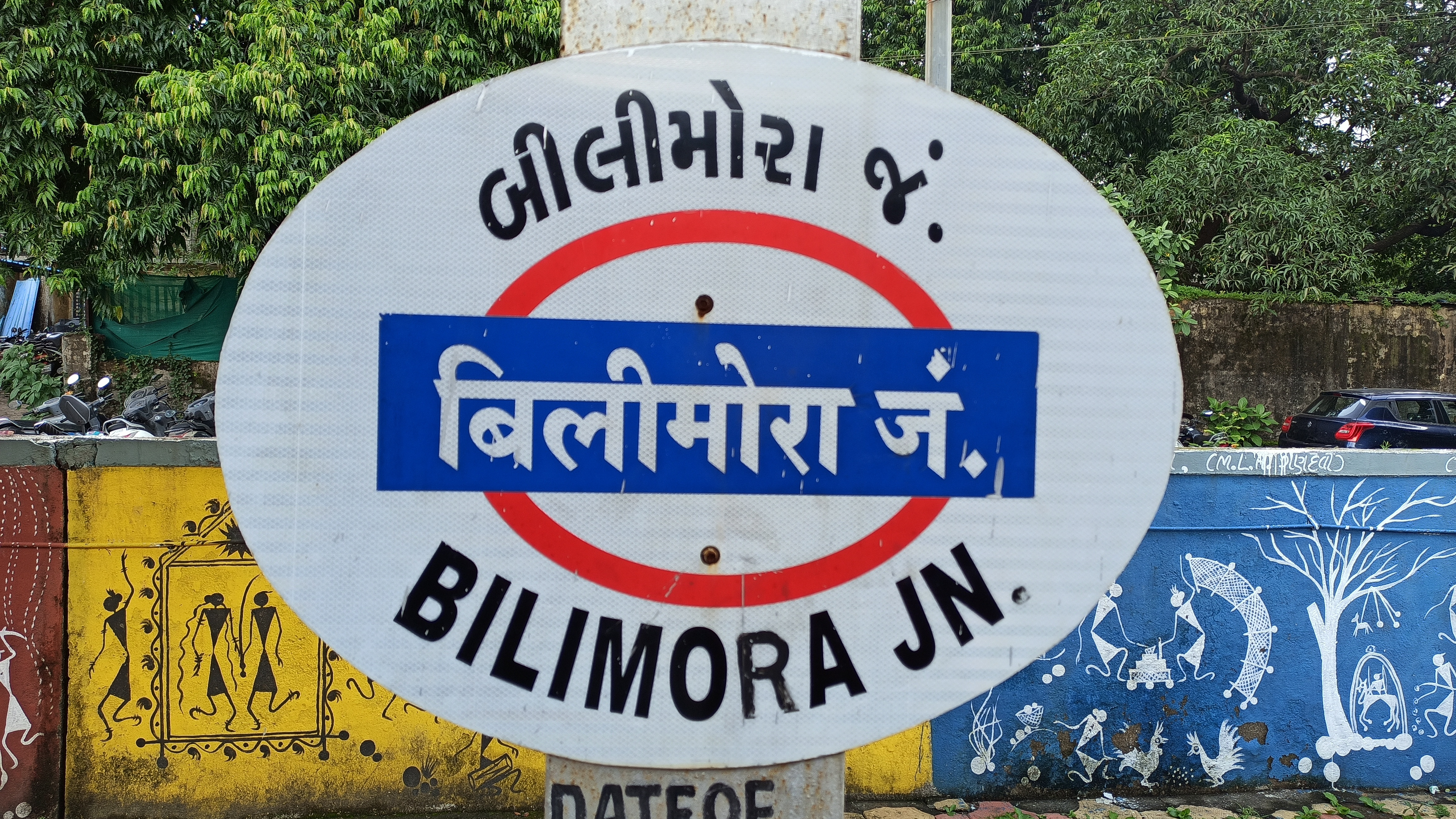
Bilimora Junction Platform Board

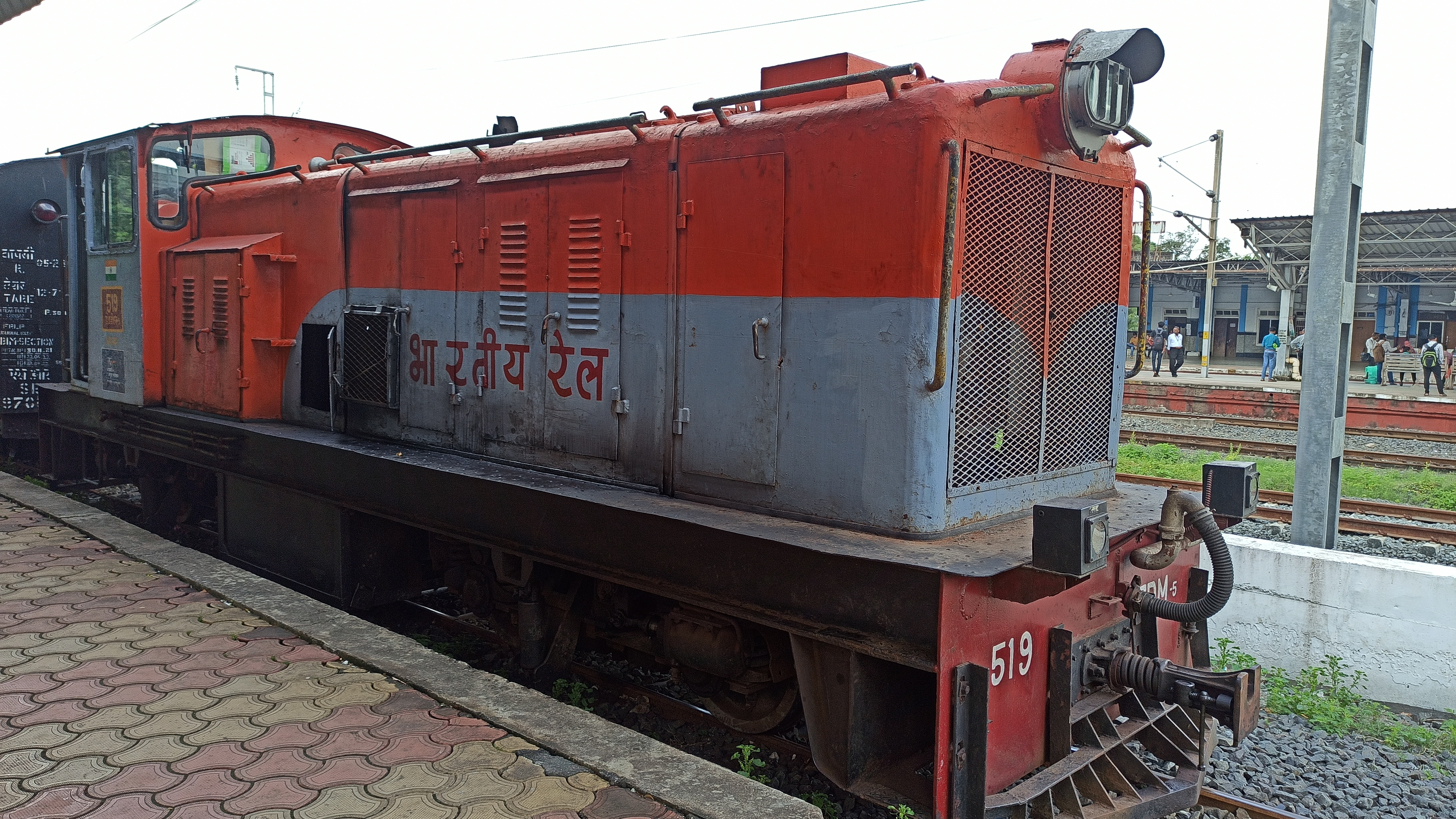
ZDM5 Pratapnagar Heritage Engine

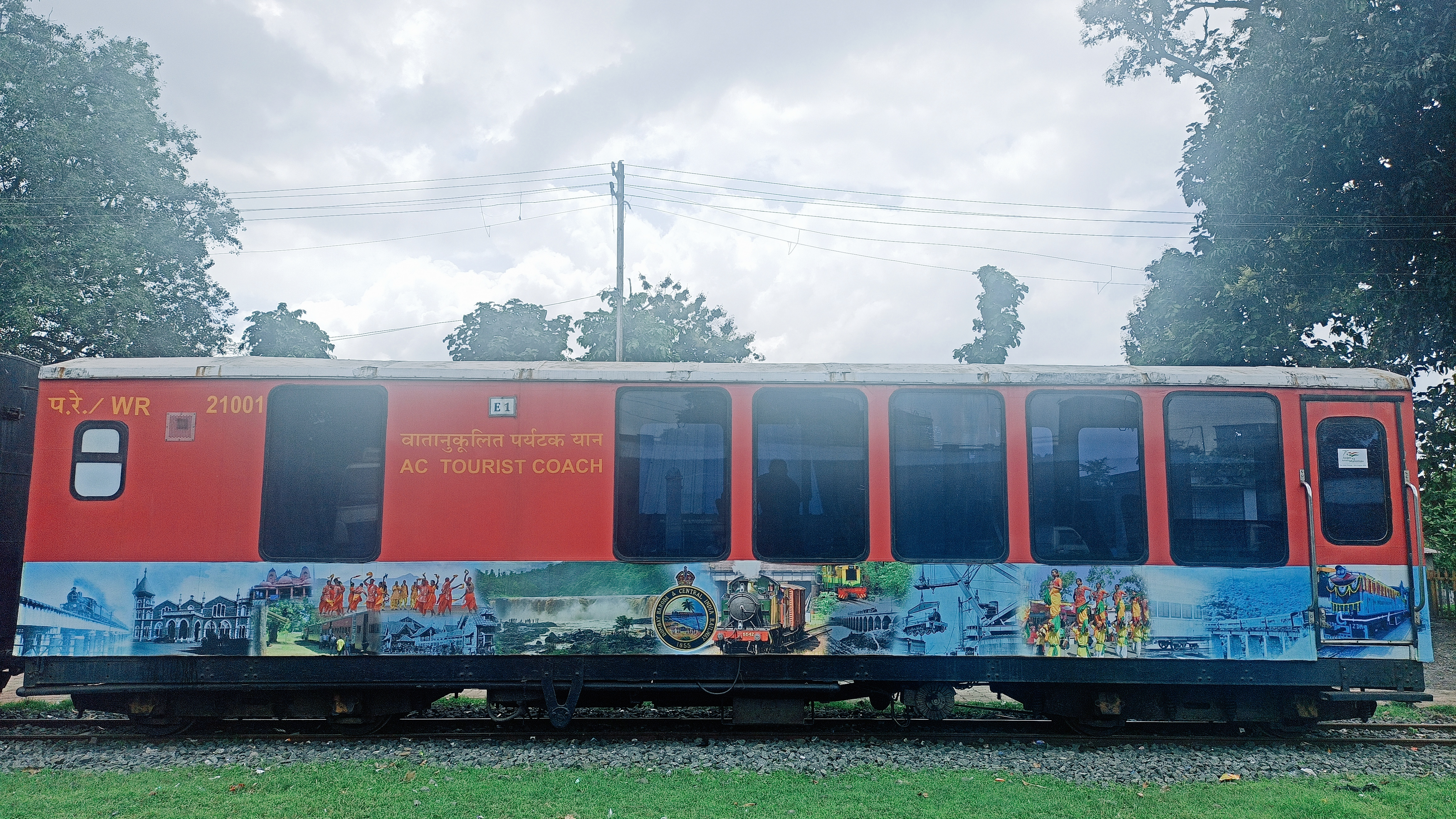
AC Vistadome Tourist Coach

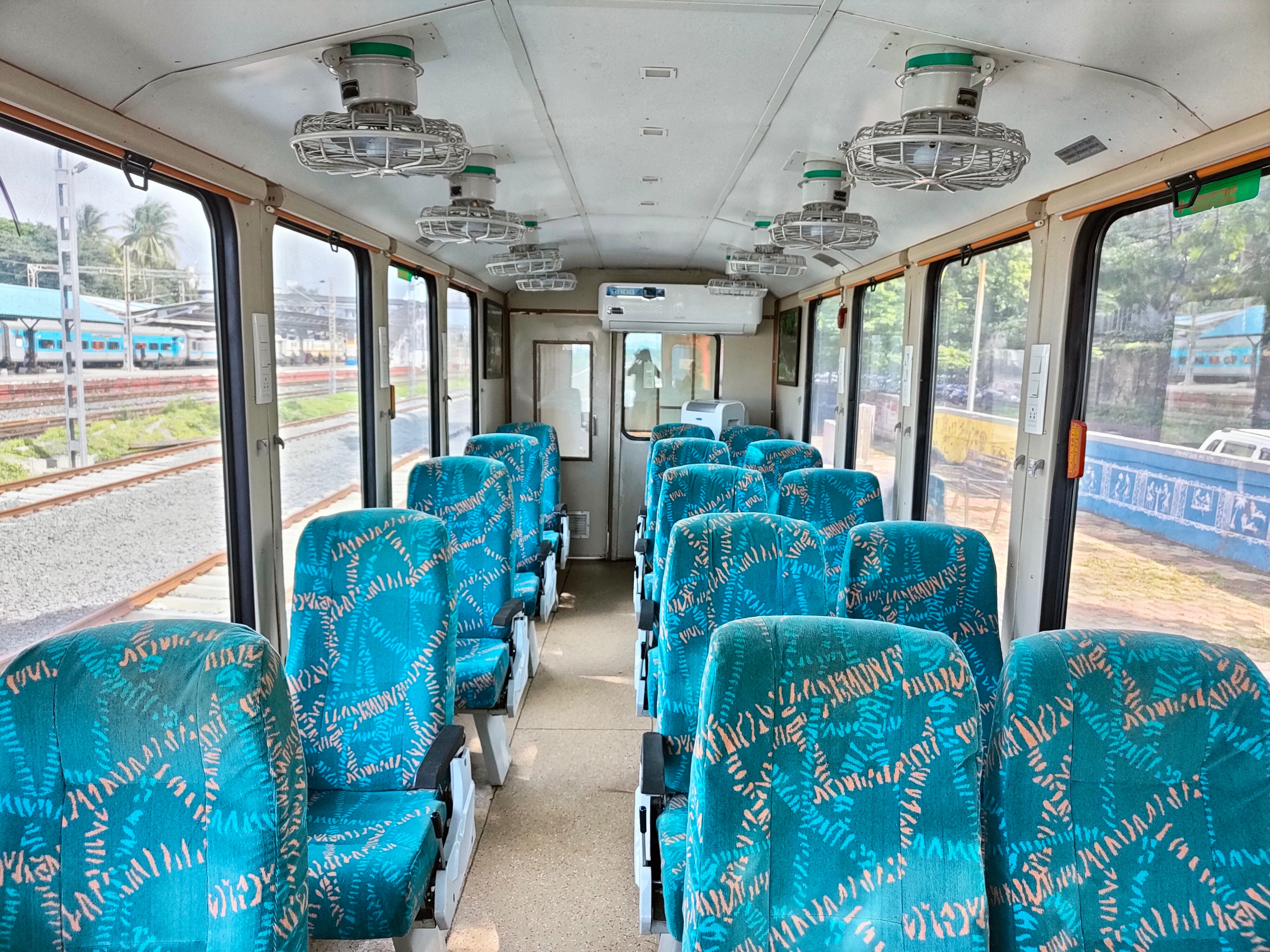
Vistadome Coach Interior
