= Dungri railway station =

Railway station in Gujarat, India

General information
- Location: Dungri, Gujarat; India
- Coordinates: 20°41′16″N 72°56′57″E
- Elevation: 18 metres (59 ft)
- System: Indian Railways station
- Owner: Ministry of Railways, Indian Railways
- Operator: Western Railway
- Lines: New Delhi–Mumbai main line Ahmedabad–Mumbai main line
- Platforms: 3
- Tracks: 3

Construction
- Structure type: Standard (on ground)
- Parking: No

Other information
- Status: Functioning
- Station code: DGI
- Zone(s): Western Railway
- Division(s): Mumbai WR

Services
Preceding station	Indian Railways	Following station
Joravasan towards ?	New Delhi–Mumbai main line	Valsad towards ?
Location
- Location within India Location within Gujarat

Dungri railway station is a small railway station on the Western Railway network in the state of Gujarat, India. Dungri railway station is 9 km far away from Valsad railway station. Mostly, Passenger and MEMU trains halt at Dungri railway station, but 19033/34 Valsad–Ahmedabad Gujarat Queen Express is only express train which halts here in both direction.

== See also ==
- Valsad district
