= Dahod–Bhopal Fast Passenger =

Train in India

Dahod-Bhopal Fast Passenger
Overview
- Service type: Passenger
- Locale: Gujarat & Madhya Pradesh
- Current operator(s): Western Railway zone

Route
- Termini: Dahod (DHD); Bhopal Junction (BPL)
- Stops: 48
- Distance travelled: 394 km (245 mi)
- Average journey time: 10 hours 5 minutes
- Service frequency: Daily
- Train number(s): 59393/59394

On-board services
- Class(es): AC 3 Tier, Sleeper Class, General Unreserved
- Seating arrangements: Yes
- Sleeping arrangements: No
- Catering facilities: No
- Observation facilities: ICF coach
- Entertainment facilities: No

Technical
- Rolling stock: 2
- Track gauge: 1,676 mm (5 ft 6 in)
- Operating speed: 27 km/h (17 mph)

The 59393/59394 Dahod - Bhopal Fast Passenger is a passenger train of the Indian Railways connecting Dahod in Gujarat and Bhopal Junction in Madhya Pradesh. It is currently being operated with 59393/59394 train numbers on a daily basis.

== Coach composition ==
The train consists of 18 coaches:

- 13 General Unreserved
- 1 AC Seating
- 1 Second Seating
- 2 Seating cum Luggage Rake

== Service ==
The 59393/Dahod - Bhopal Fast Passenger has average speed of 39 km/h and covers 394 km in 10 hours 5 minutes with 48 stops on the route.

The 59394/Bhopal - Dahod Fast Passenger has average speed of 36 km/h and covers 394 km in 11 hours 5 minutes with 48 stops on the route.

== Schedule ==
Train Number	Station Code	Departure Station	Departure Time	Departure Day	Arrival Station	Arrival Time	Arrival Day
59393	DHD	Dahod	05:45	Daily	Bhopal Junction	15:50	Daily
59394	BPL	Bhopal Junction	11:55	Daily	Dahod	23:00	Daily

== Route ==
The 59393/59394 Dahod - Bhopal Fast Passenger runs from Dahod via Ratlam Junction, Nagda Junction, Ujjain Junction, Maksi Junction, Sant Hirdaram Nagar to Bhopal Junction and vice versa.

== Traction ==
Both trains are hauled by a Vadodara Loco Shed based WAP 5 or WAP 4E electric locomotives.
