= Dungri =

Village in Gujarat state, India

Coordinates: 20.692°N 72.951°E

Dungri is a city located in the Valsad district, in the West Indian state of Gujarat. The village is served by bus and by the Dungri Railway Station, located in the heart of Dungri, close to the Bazzar. Balaji Wafers is located in Dungri, by National Highway 8

== Demographics ==
The highest population is Patel.

== Economy ==
Dungri's economy includes range of agriculture, including mango, rice, and sugar cane.

The economy of Dungri has been growing significantly for the past decade. For the past several years there have been numerous new homes and buildings constructed. The price of the land has significantly grown in the past decade which has attracted more investors to purchase and sell the land.

=== Beach ===
Dati Beach 10 KM from Dungri City

=== Hospital ===
- Dr. Dineshbhai D. Vaidya, Hospital
- Arpan Hospital
- Primary Health Centre
- Referel hospital

=== Medical Store ===
- Krishna Medical & General Store
- Arpan Medical Store
- ShreejiMedical Store

=== Houses of worship ===
- Bhramadev Bapa Mandir (Mountain Temple)
- Ramji Mandir
- Amba Mata Mandir
- Khodiyar Mataji Mandir
- Swaminarayan Mandir
- Shiv temple
- Sai Baba Mandir
- Joganmata Mandir
- Masjid- r.s masjid

=== Schools ===
- Purav Vibhag Dungri School
- Prathamik School
- Sarvajanik High School
- Jivinana Primary School
- Kashyap Art School

=== Railways ===
- Dungri (DGI)

=== National highway ===
- National highway no.48
- Pincode : 396375
