= Dahod–Ratlam MEMU =

Train in India

Overview
- Service type: MEMU
- Locale: Madhya Pradesh & Gujarat
- Current operator: Western Railway

Route
- Termini: Dahod (DHD); Ratlam Junction (RTM)
- Stops: 12
- Distance travelled: 114 km (71 mi)
- Average journey time: 3 hrs 5 mins
- Service frequency: Daily (Note: Runs seven days in a week for every direction.)
- Train number: 69187 / 69188

On-board services
- Class: General Unreserved
- Seating arrangements: Yes
- Sleeping arrangements: No
- Catering facilities: No
- Entertainment facilities: No
- Baggage facilities: No
- Other facilities: Below the seats

Technical
- Rolling stock: ICF coach
- Track gauge: 5 ft 6 in (1,676 mm)
- Operating speed: 37 km/h (23 mph) average including halts.

Dahod–Ratlam MEMU is a MEMU train of the Indian Railways, which runs between Dahod railway station in Gujarat and Ratlam Junction railway station in Madhya Pradesh. It is currently being operated with 69187/69188 train numbers on a weekly basis.

== Route and halts ==
The important halts of the train are:

- Dahod
- Bordi
- Anas
- Meghnagar
- Thandla Road
- Panch Pipila
- Amargarh
- Bhairongarh
- Raoti
- Bildi
- Morwani
- Ratlam Junction

== Average speed and frequency ==
- The 69187/Dahod–Ratlam MEMU runs with an average speed of 37 km/h and completes 114 km in 3h 5m.
- The 69188/Ratlam–Dahod MEMU runs with an average speed of 40 km/h and completes 114 km in 2h 50m.

== See also ==
- Dahod railway station
- Ratlam Junction railway station
- Ujjain–Nagda MEMU
- Vadodara–Dahod MEMU
