= Vaghela Derol =

Coordinates: 24.02760476°N 73.1125837°E

Derol, popularly known as Vaghela Derol, is a village situated in Khedbrahma Taluka of Sabarkantha District in Gujarat, India. The village was formerly ruled by Vaghela kings hence the name Vaghela's Derol.

It is located on the banks of Harnav river.

There is an ancient Shiva Temple in the village. There are three Jain temples believed to have been constructed in 12th century. Two of them belongs to Digambara Jains which are dedicated to Parshwanatha and Adinatha respectively while the other one belongs to Swetambara Jains.

It is 10 km away from Khedbrahma. There is a Primary Health Centre and a post office.
