= Vadnagar railway station =

Railway station in Gujarat, India

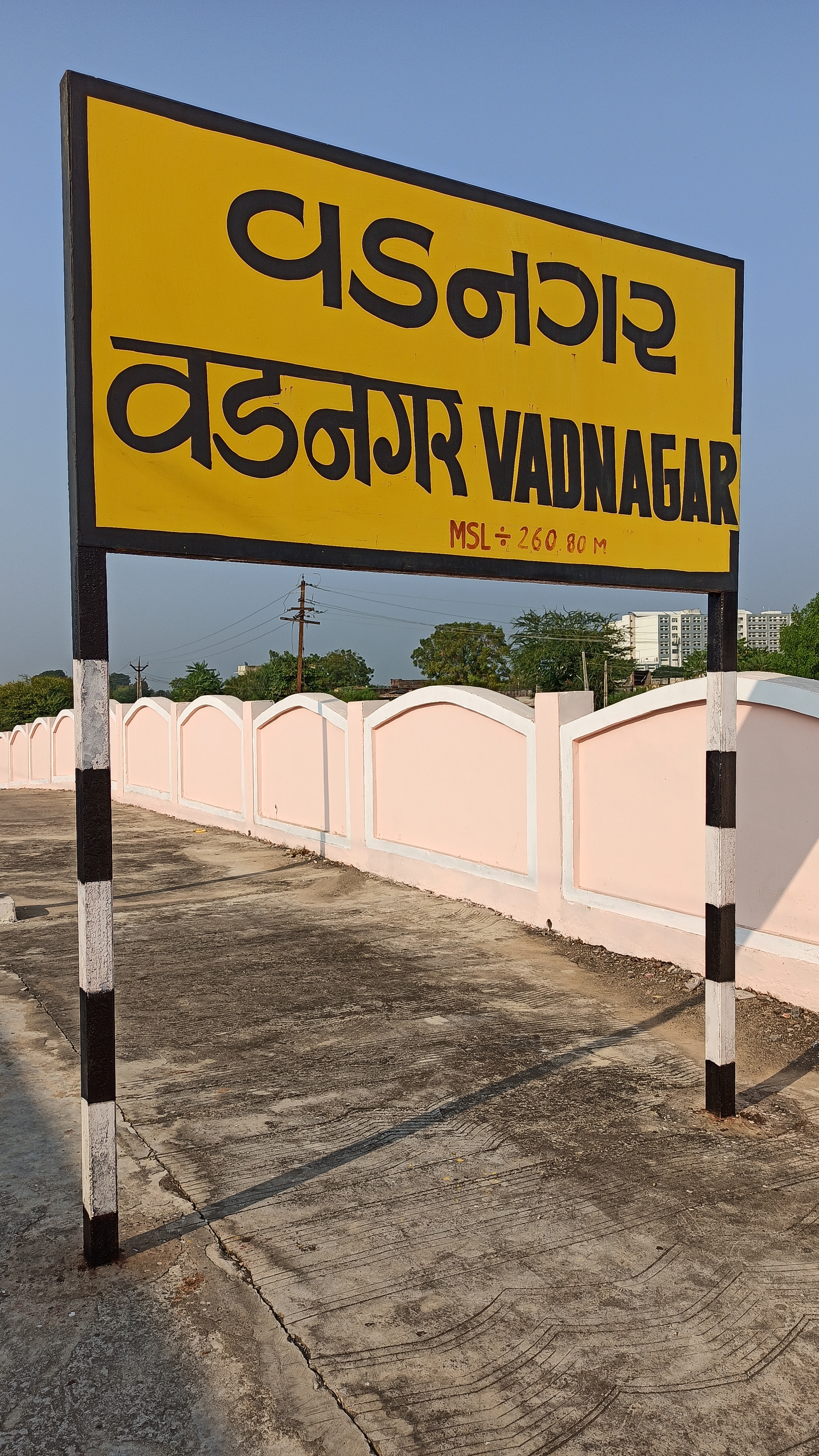

General information
- Location: India
- Coordinates: 23.784°N 72.633°E
- Elevation: 156 metres (512 ft)
- System: Passenger train station
- Owner: Indian Railways
- Operator: Western Railways
- Line: Mahesana–Taranga Hill line
- Platforms: 2
- Tracks: 3
- Connections: auto-rickshaw stand

Construction
- Structure type: Standard (on-ground station)
- Parking: Yes
- Accessible: Available

Other information
- Station code: VDG
- Zone(s): Western Railway zone
- Division(s): Ahmedabad

History
- Opened: 21 March 1887
Location

Vadnagar railway station (station code: VDG) is a railway station in Vadnagar, Mehsana district, Gujarat. Vadnagar railway station is on the Mahesana–Taranga Hill line, a branch railway line. It is under the Ahmedabad railway division of Western Railway zone of Indian Railways. It is located 156 metres (512 ft) above mean sea level. The nearest railway junction is Mahesana Junction railway station and the nearest passenger airport is Sardar Vallabhbhai Patel International Airport at Ahmedabad.

== History ==
In 1881, the Government of Bombay addressed His Highness’ Government of Baroda State for the construction of feeder lines in Kadi after the completion of Dabhoi Railway. In Kadi, a network of railway line was spread out. The Government of Bombay and the government of Baroda State, sanctioned the Mehsana–Viramgam line in 1889. The Mehsana–Taranga Hill metre-gauge line was opened for traffic from 1887 to 1909. The line is 57 km. in length. The Mehsana–Vadnagar section was opened to traffic on 21 March 1887, Vadnagar–Kheralu section was opened on 12 Dec 1888 and Kheralu–Taranga Hill section was opened on 20 Aug 1909.

The Viramgam–Mahesana section was converted to 5 ft 6 in (1,676 mm) broad gauge in 2005. The Mehsana–Vadnagar section was converted to broad gauge in July 2019. The Vadnagar–Taranga Hill section is under conversion as of 2020. The Mehsana–Vadnagar section was electrified with 25 kV AC in Jan 2020. The electrification of Vadnagar–Taranga Hill section is under progress as of 2020. The railway line is also planned to be extended up to Abu Road railway station in neighbouring Rajasthan, connecting to Ahmedabad–Delhi railway line.

== Infrastructure and Facilities ==
The station has 2 platforms. The station has a waiting area, a refreshment stall and an ATM. The station also has an auto-rickshaw stand. GSRTC Vadnagar bus stand is adjacent to the railway station.

== Gallery ==
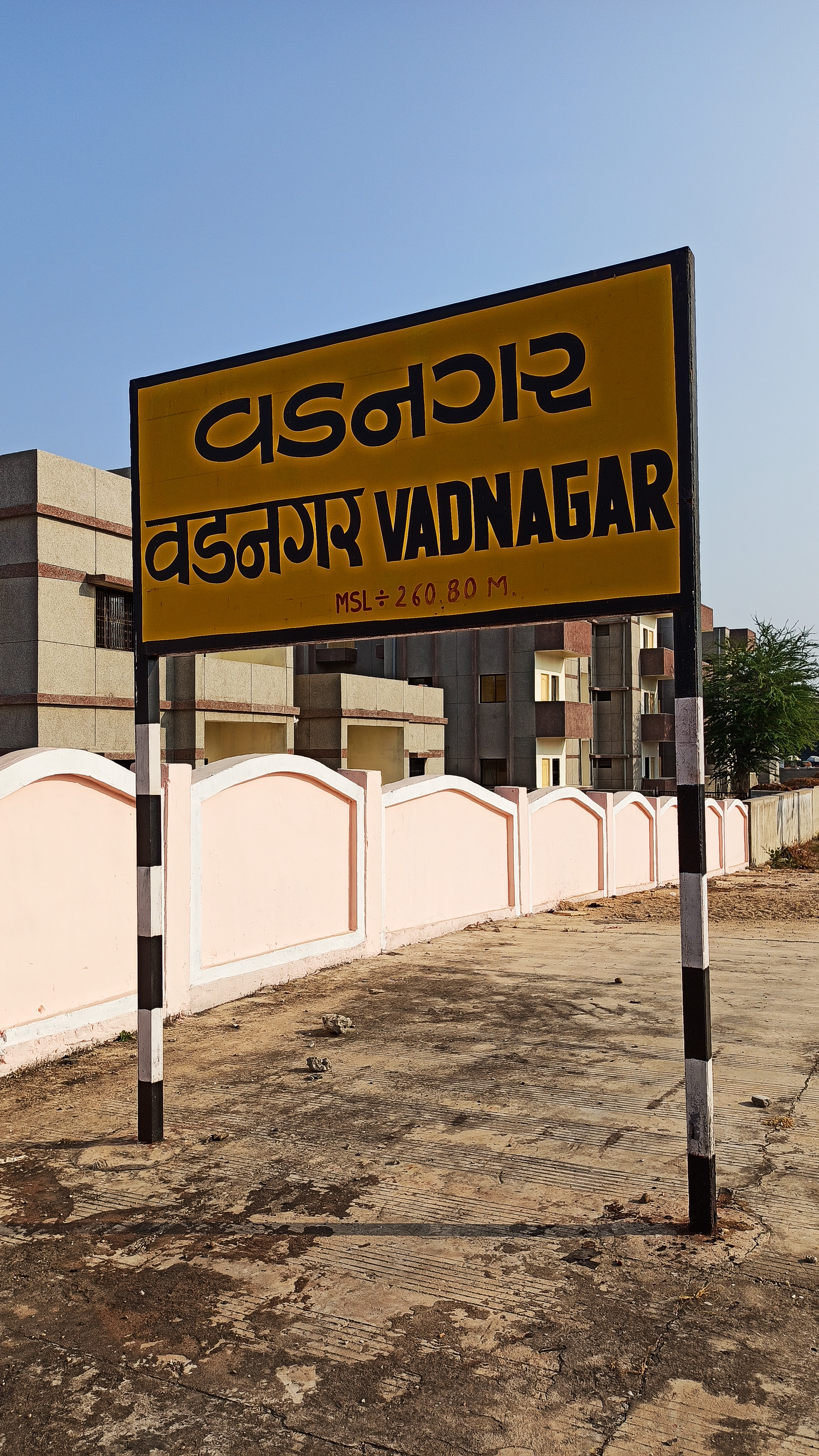
Vadnagar Platform Board

Vadnagar Station

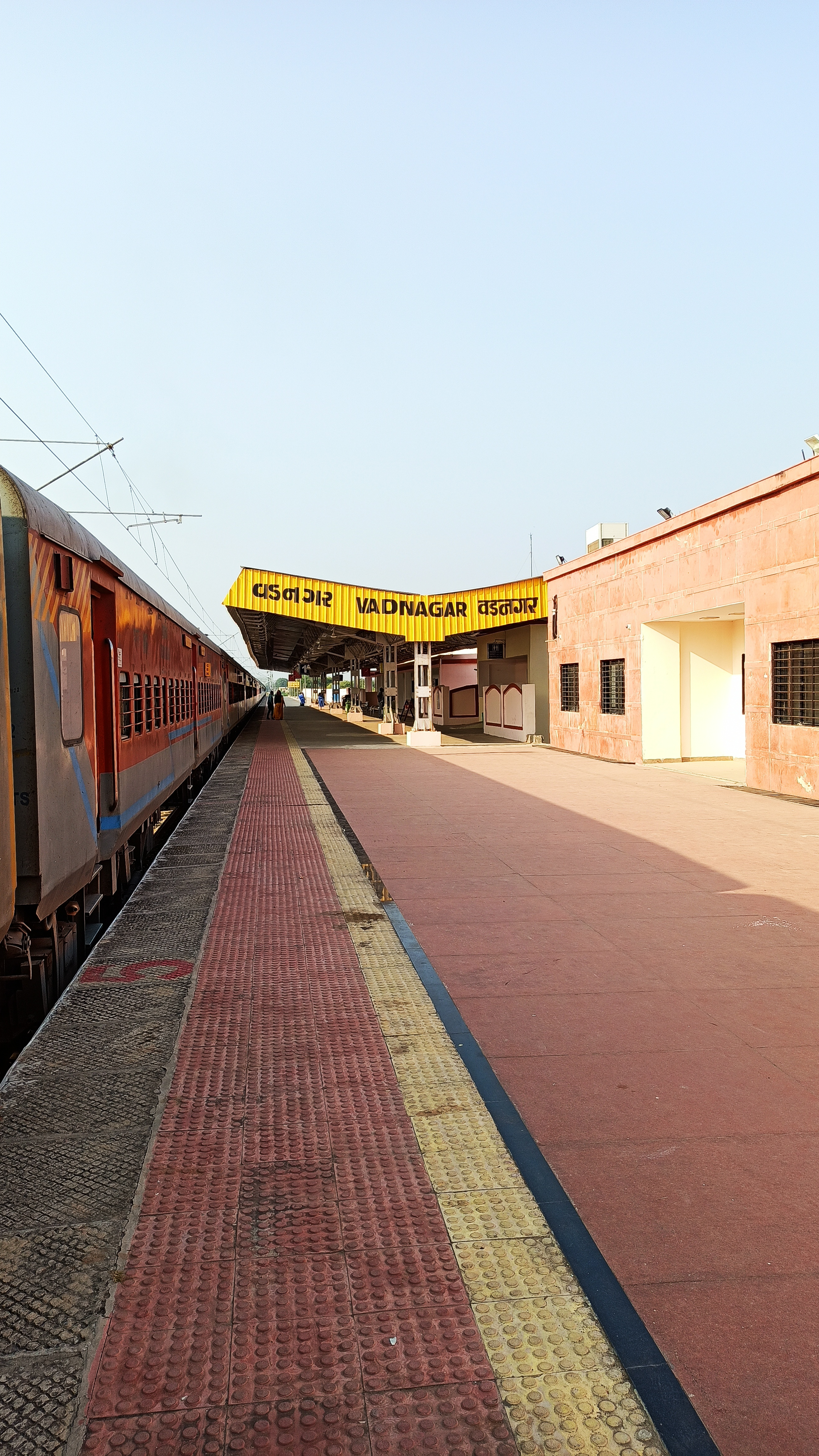
Vadnagar Platform No 1

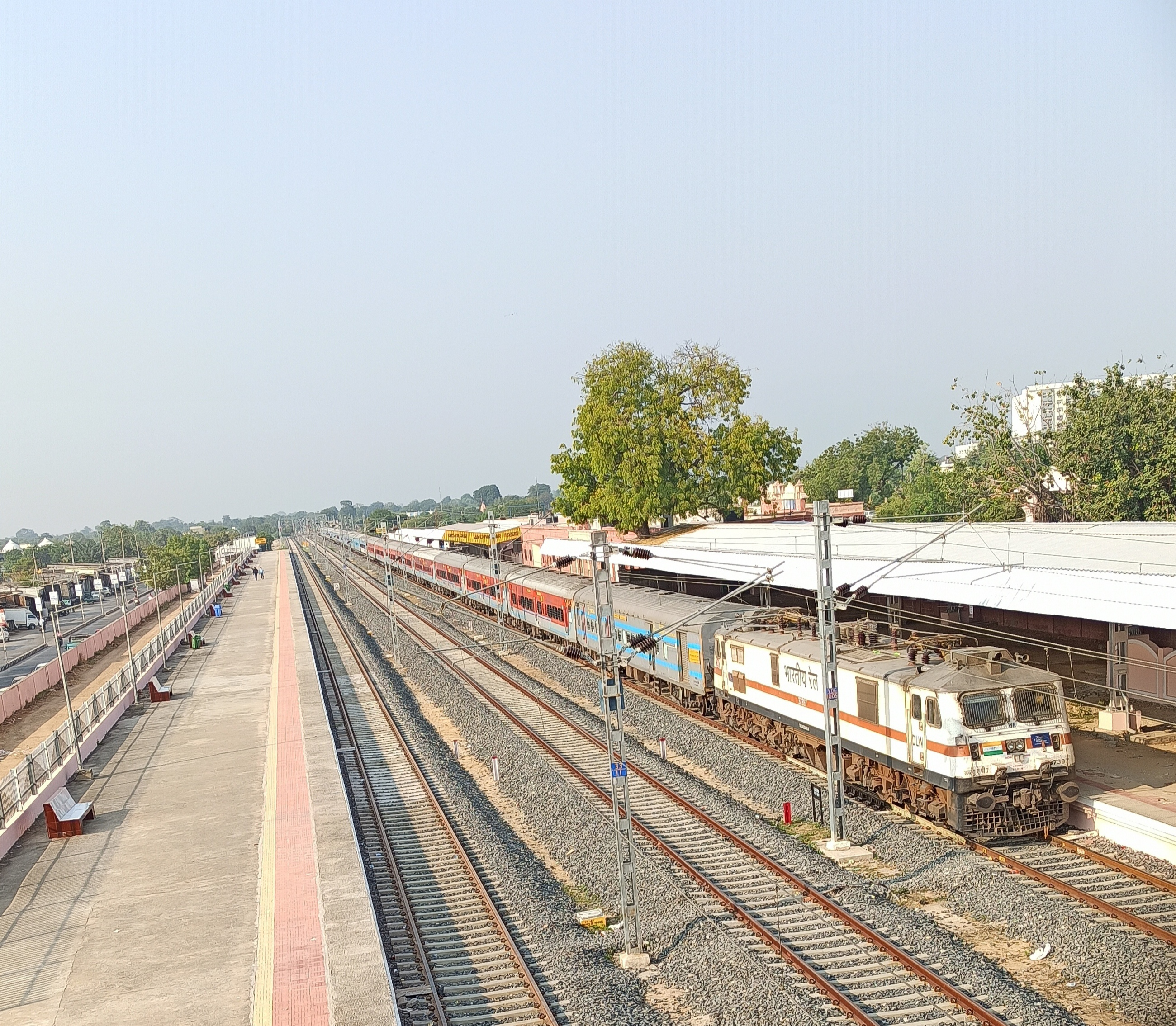
Vadnagar - Valsad Intercity Express at Vadnagar

== Trivia ==
Narendra Modi, the current Prime Minister of India, was born and raised in Vadnagar town. As a child, Modi is said to have helped his father sell tea at the Vadnagar railway station.
