= Dahod railway station =

Railway station in Gujarat, India

Dahod
- Indian Railways logo

General information
- Location: Godi Road, Dahod, Gujarat; India
- Coordinates: 22°50′37″N 74°15′15″E
- Elevation: 314 m (1,030 ft)
- System: Indian Railways station
- Owner: Indian Railways
- Operator: Western Railways
- Line: New Delhi–Mumbai main line
- Platforms: 3
- Tracks: 7
- Connections: Auto stand

Construction
- Structure type: Standard (on ground)
- Parking: Yes
- Accessible: Available

Other information
- Status: Functioning
- Station code: DHD
- Zone(s): Western Railway zone
- Division(s): Ratlam
Location
- Location within Gujarat Location within India

Dahod railway station (station code: DHD) is a railway station serving Dahod town, in Dahod district of Gujarat state of India. It is under Ratlam railway division of Western Railway zone of Indian Railways. It is located on New Delhi–Mumbai main line of the Indian Railways.

Dahod is well connected by rail to Indore Junction, Bhopal Junction, Jabalpur Junction, Hazrat Nizamuddin, Jaipur Junction, Udaipur City, Ahmedabad Junction, Amritsar Junction, Shri Mata Vaishno Devi Katra, Dehradun, Mumbai Central, Muzaffarpur Junction, Firozpur Cantonment, Varanasi Junction.

The Dahod–Indore Rail Project is scheduled for completion at the end of 2022. Dahod will be connect to Indore through Dhar and Jhabua. Dahod–Indore Rail Project is 204.76 km long.

== Trains ==
The following Passenger, MEMU, and Superfast trains start from here:

- 19011/12 Valsad–Dahod Intercity Superfast Express
- 69189/90 Dahod–Anand MEMU
- 69117/18 Dahod–Vadodara MEMU
- 69119/20 Vadodara–Dahod MEMU
- 69181/82 Ratlam–Dahod MEMU
- 69187/88 Dahod–Ratlam MEMU
- 59393/94 Dahod–Bhopal Fast Passenger
