= Limkheda railway station =

Railway station in Dahod district of Gujarat State of India

Limkheda railway station

General information
- Location: Limkheda, Gujarat; India
- Coordinates: 22°50′05″N 73°59′05″E
- Elevation: 205 m (673 ft)
- System: Indian Railway Station
- Owner: Indian Railways
- Operator: Western Railway
- Line: New Delhi–Mumbai main line
- Platforms: 3
- Tracks: 3

Construction
- Structure type: Standard (On Ground)
- Parking: Yes

Other information
- Status: Functioning
- Station code: LMK
- Zone(s): Western Railway
- Division(s): Ratlam
Location
- Location within India Location within Gujarat

Limkheda railway station is a railway station in Dahod district of Gujarat State of India. It is under Ratlam railway division of Western Railway Zone of Indian Railways. It is located on New Delhi–Mumbai main line of the Indian Railways. Passenger, MEMU and Express trains halt here.

== Major Trains ==
Following trains halt at Limkheda railway station in both direction:

- 19019/20 Bandra Terminus - Dehradun Express
- 12929/30 Valsad - Dahod Intercity Superfast Express
- 19023/24 Mumbai Central - Firozpur Janata Express
- 19309/10 Gandhinagar Capital - Indore Shanti Express
