= Kalol, Panchmahal =

Kalol
- Town
- Location in Gujarat, India
- Coordinates: 22.606°N 73.463°E
- Country: India
- State: Gujarat
- District: Panchmahal district
- Elevation: 100 m (330 ft)

Population (2020)
  - Total: 42,100

Languages
  - Official: Gujarati, Hindi
- Time zone: UTC+5:30 (IST)
- PIN: 389330
- Telephone code: 02676
- Vehicle registration: GJ-17
- Sex ratio: 52Male:46Female ♂/♀
- Website: https://factskamaza.online

Kalol is a town and a municipality (tehsil) in Panchmahal district in the Indian state of Gujarat.

== Geography ==
Kalol is located at 22.606°N 73.463°E. It has an average elevation of 100 metres (328 feet). It has one pond.

== Industry ==
Kalol and Halol (nearest city) constitute a Special Economic Zone (SEZ). Larger companies are located here like MG Car Company Limited (Morris Garages), Raychem RPG Pvt Ltd (RPG), AMBE International, SETCO Automotive, CEAT Tyres, GUNNEBO, Panchmahal Steel, Sintex Industries (plastic containers), Grandtech Engineering Works, Hero MotoCorp, INOX India Ltd., Plastichemix, DeviDayal Agro Chemicals, Bayer ABS, HNG Float Glass, Integra Engineering India Ltd, Krishna Defense & Dairy Industries Ltd and many more. General Motors India Private Limited was shifted to Maharashtra State.

== Demographics ==
As of 2001 census, Kalol had a population of 111,700, out of which 54% male and 46% female. Kalol makes majority of Kalol Urban Aggmaration, other village of which is Derol Station with a population of 3,226. Total population of Kalol UA is 27,903.

== Transport ==
=== Road ===
Kalol lies on the four lane toll road Halol-Godhra Highway, which passes through the town. It is connected to Godhra (27 km) in North and Halol (13 km) and Vadodara(50 km) to the South. Apart from main highway, it is connected to adjacent villages through network of country roads. Most of the country roads are paved, single-lane traffic and reasonably maintained. Portion of the highway between Halol and Vadodara is toll road.

=== Rail ===
Adjoining village of Derol Station provides railway connectivity to Kalol. Railway connections are available to Vadodara, Godhra and Dahod through short distance memu trains. It is connected to Mumbai and Delhi through two long distance trains - Firozpur Janata express and Dehradun express. It is also connected with Rajkot, Ahmedabad, Ratlam, Ujjain, Indore, Bhopal and Jabalpur through Jabalpur - Somnath Express and Indore Gandhinagar Shanti Express trains.

=== Bus ===
Apart from railways, Kalol is served by the bus network of Gujarat State Road Transport Corporation GSRTC. After getting new bus depot, Kalol now has vast range of local bus connectivity and also a number of express buses for Godhra and Vadodara routes. Kalol Bus Station comes under Godhra ST Division.

=== Air ===
The nearest airport is Vadodara Airport (IATA: BDQ, ICAO: VABO), which is about 52 km away from town. Vadodara Airport is an International airport but has limited destinations of flights going abroad; it has direct flight connection to Mumbai and Delhi

Another nearby international airport is Ahmedabad Airport, which has flight connections to domestic and international destinations such as USA, London, Paris and FrankFurt.

== Education ==
Primary, secondary and higher secondary education is provided by the schools in town. Schools are there for both Gujarati and English medium of instructions. Some of the schools are MGS High School, PKS High School, Shree Bhagini Seva Mandal Kumarshala, Girls School, Shantiniketan Rotary Vidhyalaya (REM school), Maharshi Vidyalaya-Gujarati Medium, Navrachna Gurukul Kids in English and Gujarati medium, Ankur Vidhyalaya-English Medium, Little Flower.

Higher education is limited to Bachelors College affiliated with Shri Govind Guru University. College provides degrees in major of Commerce, Arts and Law. Also P. P. Chauhan Institute for computer education (BCA) situated at Alindra four-crossing, Kalol.

Computer education is located at I.T.C.T. Computer Academy, Kalol. M. M. Gandhi Arts and Commerce College is situated near by Kalol.

== Hospital ==
Hospital and Clinics like Referral Hospital, Astha Hospital, Supeda Hospital, Kalol Hospital, Sanjivani hospital, Pooja hospital, Vatsalya hospital, Radha Gopi Hospital and more small hospitals are available in the city.
