= Samlaya Junction railway station =

Railway station in Gujarat, India

Samlaya Junction
- Indian Railway Stations logo

General information
- Location: Samlaya, Gujarat; India
- Coordinates: 22°29′05″N 73°18′10″E
- Elevation: 67 metres (220 ft)
- System: Indian Railway Station
- Owner: Ministry of Railways, Indian Railways
- Operator: Western Railway
- Line: New Delhi–Mumbai main line
- Platforms: 3
- Tracks: 3

Construction
- Structure type: Standard (On Ground)
- Parking: No

Other information
- Status: Functioning
- Station code: SMLA
- Zone(s): Western Railway
- Division(s): Vadodara
Location
- Location within India Location within Gujarat

Samlaya Junction railway station is a railway station on the Western Railway network in the state of Gujarat, India. Samlaya Junction railway station is 26 km from Vadodara railway station. Passenger, MEMU, Express and Superfast trains halt at Samlaya Junction railway station.

== Nearby stations ==
Alindra Road is the nearest railway station towards Vadodara, whereas Lotana is the nearest railway station towards Dahod.

== Trains ==
The following Express/Superfast trains halt at Samlaya Junction railway station in both directions:

- 12929/30 Valsad - Dahod Intercity Superfast Express
- 19023/24 Mumbai Central - Firozpur Janata Express
- 19019/20 Mumbai Central - Dehradun Express

== See also ==
- Vadodara district
