= Derol railway station =

Railway Station in Gujarat, India

General information
- Location: Derol, Kalol, Gujarat; India
- Coordinates: 22°37′47″N 73°27′43″E
- Elevation: 87 metres (285 ft)
- System: Indian Railways station
- Owner: Indian Railways
- Operator: Western Railway
- Platforms: 3
- Tracks: 6
- Connections: Auto stand

Construction
- Structure type: Standard (on ground station)
- Parking: No
- Cycle facilities: No

Other information
- Status: Functioning
- Station code: DRL
- Zone(s): Western Railway
- Division(s): Vadodara
Location
- Location within India Location within Gujarat

Derol railway station is a small railway station in Panchmahal district, Gujarat. Its code is DRL. It serves Derol village. The station consists of 3 platforms.

== Major trains ==
Following trains halt at Derol railway station in both directions:

- 12929/30 Valsad–Dahod Intercity Superfast Express
- 11463/64 Somnath–Jabalpur Express (via Itarsi)
- 11465/66 Somnath–Jabalpur Express (via Bina)
- 19309/10 Shanti Express
- 19019/20 Bandra Terminus–Dehradun Express
- 19023/24 Firozpur Janata Express
