= Panoli railway station =

Railway station in Gujarat, India

General information
- Location: Panoli, Gujarat; India
- Coordinates: 21°32′10″N 72°58′42″E
- Elevation: 29 metres (95 ft)
- System: Indian Railway Station
- Owner: Ministry of Railways, Indian Railways
- Operator: Western Railway
- Lines: New Delhi–Mumbai main line Ahmedabad–Mumbai main line
- Platforms: 3
- Tracks: 3

Construction
- Structure type: Standard (On Ground)
- Parking: No

Other information
- Status: Functioning
- Station code: PAO
- Zone(s): Western Railway
- Division(s): Vadodara
Location
- Location within India Location within Gujarat

Panoli railway station is a railway station on the Western Railway network in the state of Gujarat, India. Panoli railway station is 20 km (12 mi) far away from Bharuch railway station. Passenger, MEMU and few Express trains halt at Panoli railway station.

== Nearby stations ==
Hathuran is the nearest railway station towards Mumbai, whereas Ankleshwar is the nearest railway station towards Vadodara.

== Major trains ==
Passenger Trains:

- 59049/50 Valsad - Viramgam Passenger
- 69149/50 Virar - Bharuch MEMU
- 59439/40 Mumbai Central - Ahmedabad Passenger
- 59441/42 Ahmedabad - Mumbai Central Passenger
- 69111/12 Surat - Vadodara MEMU
- 69171/72 Surat - Bharuch MEMU
- 69109/10 Vadodara - Surat MEMU

Following Express trains halt at Panoli railway station in both directions:

- 19033/34 Valsad - Ahmedabad Gujarat Queen Express
- 19023/24 Mumbai Central - Firozpur Janata Express
- 19215/16 Mumbai Central - Porbandar Saurashtra Express

== See also ==
- Bharuch district
