= Vadodara–Surat MEMU =

Indian train route

Overview
- Service type: MEMU
- Current operator(s): Western Railway zone

Route
- Termini: Vadodara Junction (BRC); Surat (ST)
- Stops: 22
- Distance travelled: 130 km (81 mi)
- Average journey time: 3 hrs 30 mins
- Service frequency: Daily
- Train number(s): 69109/69110

On-board services
- Class(es): Unreserved
- Seating arrangements: Yes
- Sleeping arrangements: No
- Catering facilities: No
- Entertainment facilities: No

Technical
- Rolling stock: 2
- Track gauge: 1,676 mm (5 ft 6 in)
- Operating speed: 38 km/h (24 mph)

The 69109/69110 Vadodara–Surat MEMU is a MEMU train of the Indian Railways connecting Vadodara Junction and Surat. It is currently being operated with 69109/69110 train numbers on a daily basis.

== Service ==
- 69109/Surat–Vadodara MEMU has average speed of 37 km/h and covers 130 km in 3 hrs 30 min.
- 69110/Vadodara–Surat MEMU has average speed of 40 km/h and covers 130 km in 3 hrs 15 min.

== Route ==
The 69109/10 Vadodara–Surat MEMU runs from Vadodara Junction via Vishvamitri, Miyagam Karjan Junction, Palej, Nabipur, Bharuch Junction, Ankleshwar Junction, Kosamba Junction, Kim, Sayan, Utran to Surat and vice versa.

== Coach composition ==
The train consists of 20 MEMU rake coaches.
