= Utran railway station =

Rail station in Gujarat, India

Utran
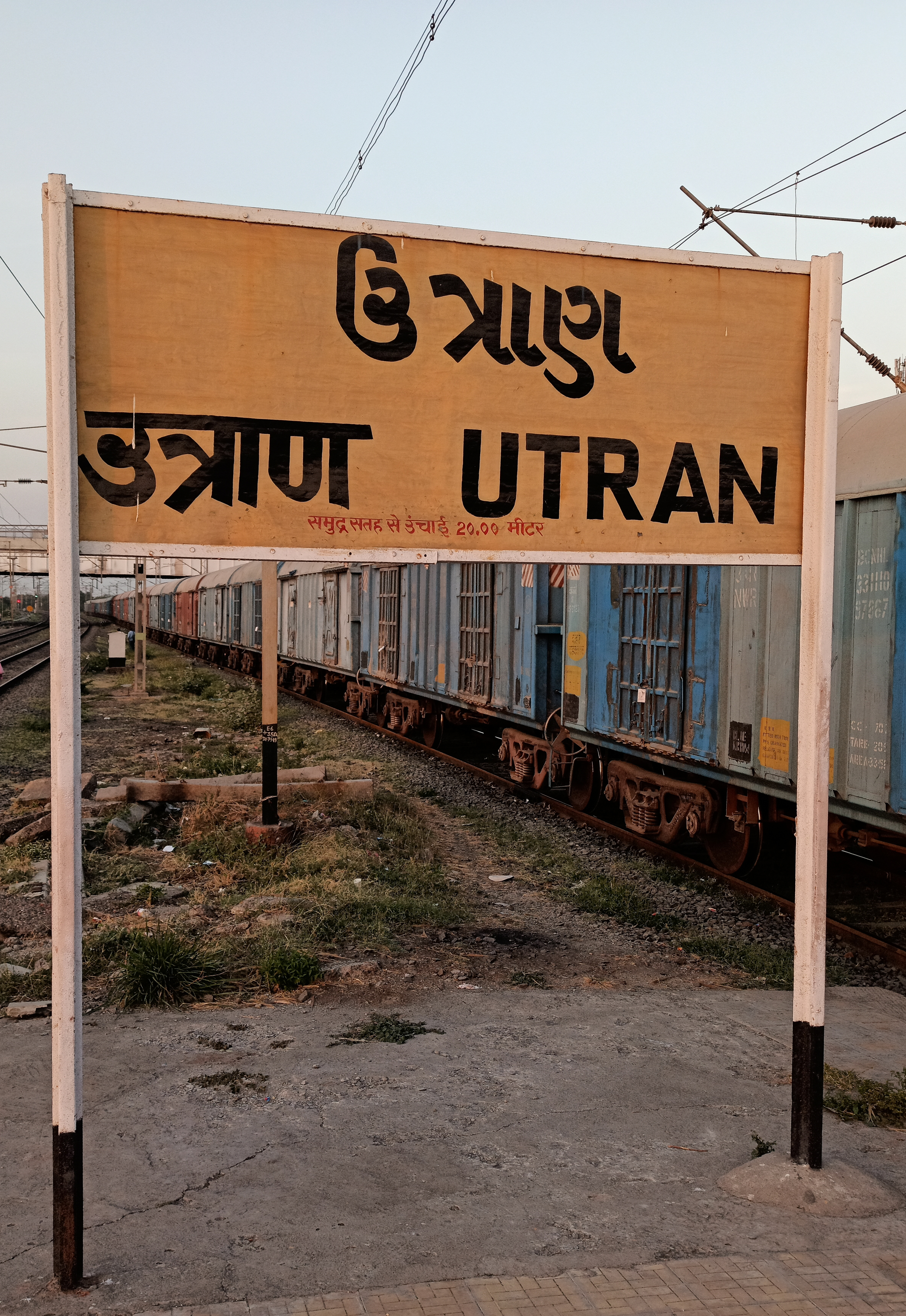

General information
- Location: Utran, Surat district, Gujarat; India
- Coordinates: 21°14′01″N 72°51′19″E
- Elevation: 15 metres (49 ft)
- System: Indian Railway Station
- Owner: Ministry of Railways, Indian Railways
- Operator: Western Railway
- Lines: New Delhi–Mumbai main line Ahmedabad–Mumbai main line
- Platforms: 3
- Tracks: 4

Construction
- Structure type: Standard (On Ground)
- Parking: Yes

Other information
- Status: Functioning
- Station code: URN
- Zone(s): Western Railway
- Division(s): Vadodara

Services
| Preceding station | Indian Railways | Following station |
|---|---|---|
| Kosad towards ? | New Delhi–Mumbai main line | Surat towards ? |
Location
- Location within India Location within Gujarat

Utran railway station is a small railway station on the Western Railway network in the state of Gujarat, India. It serves Utran town of Surat district. Utran railway station is 3 km (1.9 mi) from Surat railway station. Passenger and MEMU trains halt here.

== Trains ==
- 59049/50 Valsad - Viramgam Passenger
- 69150 Bharuch-Surat MEMU
- 59439/40 Mumbai Central - Ahmedabad Passenger
- 59441/42 Ahmedabad - Mumbai Central Passenger
- 69111/12 Surat - Vadodara MEMU
- 69171/72 Surat - Bharuch MEMU
- 69109/10 Vadodara - Surat MEMU
- 19101 Virar - Bharuch MEMU

== Gallery ==
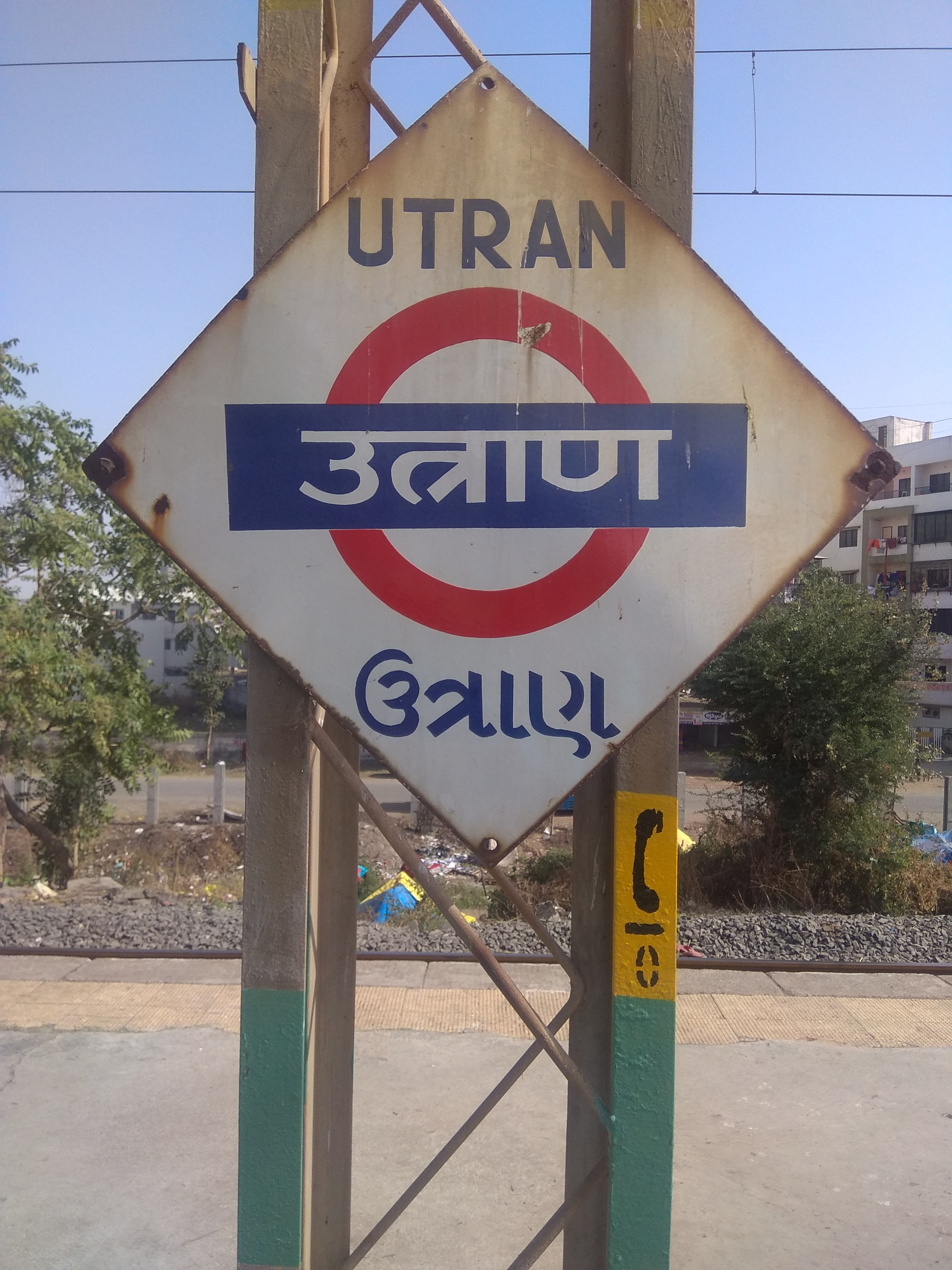
Utran Platform Board

== See also ==
- Surat district
