= Sayan railway station =

Railway station in Gujarat, India

Sayan
- Indian Railway Stations logo

General information
- Location: Sayan, Surat, Gujarat; India
- Coordinates: 21°19′03″N 72°53′25″E
- Elevation: 21 metres (69 ft)
- System: Indian Railway Station
- Owner: Ministry of Railways, Indian Railways
- Operator: Western Railway
- Lines: New Delhi–Mumbai main line Ahmedabad–Mumbai main line
- Platforms: 3
- Tracks: 3

Construction
- Structure type: Standard (On Ground)
- Parking: No

Other information
- Status: Functioning
- Station code: SYN
- Zone(s): Western Railway
- Division(s): Vadodara
Location
- Location within India Location within Gujarat

Sayan railway station is a railway station on the Western Railway network in the state of Gujarat, India. Sayan railway station is 13 km far away from Surat railway station. Passenger, MEMU and few Express trains halt at Sayan railway station.

== Nearby stations ==
Gothangam is the nearest railway station towards Mumbai, whereas Kudsad is the nearest railway station towards Vadodara.

== Major trains ==
Passenger Trains:

- 59049/50 Valsad - Viramgam Passenger
- 69149/50 Virar - Bharuch MEMU
- 59439/40 Mumbai Central - Ahmedabad Passenger
- 59441/42 Ahmedabad - Mumbai Central Passenger
- 69111/12 Surat - Vadodara MEMU
- 69171/72 Surat - Bharuch MEMU
- 69109/10 Vadodara - Surat MEMU

Following Express trains halt at Sayan railway station in both directions:

- 19033/34 Valsad - Ahmedabad Gujarat Queen Express
- 19215/16 Mumbai Central - Porbandar Saurashtra Express

== See also ==
- Surat district
