= Kosamba Junction railway station =

Railway station in Gujarat, India

General information
- Location: Kosamba, Gujarat; India
- Coordinates: 21°27′50″N 72°57′18″E
- Elevation: 28 metres (92 ft)
- System: Indian Railway Station
- Owner: Ministry of Railways, Indian Railways
- Operator: Western Railway
- Lines: New Delhi–Mumbai main line Ahmedabad–Mumbai main line Kosamba-Umarpada line(Under Gauge Conversion)
- Platforms: 4
- Tracks: 4

Construction
- Structure type: Standard (on ground)
- Parking: Yes

Other information
- Status: Functioning
- Station code: KSB
- Zone(s): Western Railway
- Division(s): Vadodara
Location
- Location within Gujarat Location within India

Kosamba Junction railway station is a railway station on the Western Railway network in the state of Gujarat, India. Kosamba Junction railway station is 31 km far away from Surat railway station. Passenger, MEMU and few Express/Superfast trains halt at Kosamba Junction railway station.

== Nearby stations ==
Kim is the nearest railway station towards Mumbai, whereas Hathuran is the nearest railway station towards Vadodara.

== Major trains ==
Passenger Trains:

- 59049/50 Valsad - Viramgam Passenger
- 69149/50 Virar - Bharuch MEMU
- 59439/40 Mumbai Central - Ahmedabad Passenger
- 59441/42 Ahmedabad - Mumbai Central Passenger
- 69111/12 Surat - Vadodara MEMU
- 69171/72 Surat - Bharuch MEMU
- 69109/10 Vadodara - Surat MEMU

Following Express/Superfast trains halt at Kosamba Junction railway station in both directions:

- 19033/34 Valsad - Ahmedabad Gujarat Queen Express
- 12929/30 Valsad - Dahod Intercity Superfast Express
- 19023/24 Mumbai Central - Firozpur Janata Express
- 19215/16 Mumbai Central - Porbandar Saurashtra Express
- 22929/30 Bhilad - Vadodara Superfast Express
- 22959/60 Surat - Jamnagar Intercity Superfast Express
- 22961/62 Surat - Hapa Intercity Weekly Superfast Express
- 22953/54 Mumbai Central - Ahmedabad Gujarat Superfast Express
- 22927/28 Bandra Terminus - Ahmedabad Lok Shakti Superfast Express
- 19019/20 Bandra Terminus - Dehradun Express
- 19115/16 Dadar - Bhuj Sayajinagari Express

== See also ==
- Surat district
