= Kim railway station =

Railway station in Gujarat, India

General information
- Location: Kim, Gujarat; India
- Coordinates: 21°24′00″N 72°55′36″E
- Elevation: 17 metres (56 ft)
- System: Indian Railway Station
- Owner: Ministry of Railways, Indian Railways
- Operator: Western Railway
- Lines: New Delhi–Mumbai main line Ahmedabad–Mumbai main line
- Platforms: 2
- Tracks: 4

Construction
- Structure type: Standard (On Ground)
- Parking: Yes

Other information
- Status: Functioning
- Station code: KIM
- Zone(s): Western Railway
- Division(s): Vadodara
Location
- Location within India Location within Gujarat

Kim railway station is a railway station on the Western Railway network in the state of Gujarat, India. Kim railway station is 24 km far away from Surat railway station. Passenger, MEMU and few Express/Superfast trains halt at Kim railway station.

== Nearby stations ==
Kudsad is nearest railway station towards Mumbai, whereas Kosamba Junction is nearest railway station towards Vadodara.

== Major trains ==
Passenger Trains:

- 59049/50 Valsad - Viramgam Passenger
- 69149/50 Virar - Bharuch MEMU
- 59439/40 Mumbai Central - Ahmedabad Passenger
- 59441/42 Ahmedabad - Mumbai Central Passenger
- 69111/12 Surat - Vadodara MEMU
- 69171/72 Surat - Bharuch MEMU
- 69109/10 Vadodara - Surat MEMU

Following Express/Superfast trains halt at Kim railway station in both directions:

- 19033/34 Valsad - Ahmedabad Gujarat Queen Express
- 12929/30 Valsad - Dahod Intercity Superfast Express
- 19023/24 Mumbai Central - Firozpur Janata Express
- 19215/16 Mumbai Central - Porbandar Saurashtra Express
- 22929/30 Bhilad - Vadodara Superfast Express
- 22959/60 Surat - Jamnagar Intercity Superfast Express
- 22961/62 Surat - Hapa Intercity Weekly Superfast Express
- 22953/54 Mumbai Central - Ahmedabad Gujarat Superfast Express

== See also ==
- Surat district
