= Nabipur railway station =

Railway station in Gujarat, India

General information
- Location: Nabipur, Gujarat; India
- Coordinates: 21°48′29″N 73°01′51″E
- Elevation: 21 metres (69 ft)
- System: Indian Railway Station
- Owner: Ministry of Railways, Indian Railways
- Operator: Western Railway
- Lines: New Delhi–Mumbai main line Ahmedabad–Mumbai main line
- Platforms: 3
- Tracks: 3

Construction
- Structure type: Standard (On Ground)
- Parking: No

Other information
- Status: Functioning
- Station code: NIU
- Zone(s): Western Railway
- Division(s): Vadodara
Location
- Location within India Location within Gujarat

Nabipur railway station is a railway station on the Western Railway network in the state of Gujarat, India. Nabipur railway station is 12 km far away from Bharuch railway station. It is under Vadodara railway division of Western Railway Zone. Its serves Nabipur Town. Station code of Nabipur is NIU. Passenger, MEMU and few Express trains halt at Nabipur railway station.

== Nearby stations ==
Chavaj is the nearest railway station towards Mumbai, whereas Varediya is the nearest railway station towards Vadodara.

== Major trains ==
Following Express trains halt at Nabipur railway station in both direction:

- 19033/34 Valsad - Ahmedabad Gujarat Queen Express
- 19023/24 Mumbai Central - Firozpur Janata Express
- 19215/16 Mumbai Central - Porbandar Saurashtra Express

== See also ==
- Bharuch district
