= Surat–Vadodara MEMU =

Indian train route

Overview
- Service type: MEMU
- Current operator(s): Western Railway zone

Route
- Termini: Surat (ST); Vadodara (BRC)
- Stops: 11
- Distance travelled: 130 km (81 mi)
- Average journey time: 3 hrs 10 mins
- Service frequency: Daily
- Train number(s): 69111/69112

On-board services
- Class(es): Unreserved
- Seating arrangements: Yes
- Sleeping arrangements: No
- Catering facilities: No
- Entertainment facilities: No

Technical
- Rolling stock: 2
- Track gauge: 1,676 mm (5 ft 6 in)
- Operating speed: 42 km/h (26 mph)

The 69111/69112 Surat–Vadodara MEMU is a MEMU train of the Indian Railways connecting Surat and Vadodara Junction of Gujarat. It is currently being operated with 69111/69112 train numbers on a daily basis.

== Service ==
- 69111/Surat–Vadodara MEMU has average speed of 42 km/h and covers 130 km in 3 hrs 5 min.
- 69112/Vadodara–Surat MEMU has average speed of 41 km/h and covers 130 km in 3 hrs 10 min.

== Route ==
The 69111/12 Surat–Vadodara MEMU runs from Surat via Kim, Kosamba Junction, Ankleshwar Junction, Bharuch Junction, Palej, Miyagam Karjan Junction, Vishvamitri to Vadodara Junction, and vice versa.

== Coach composition ==
The train consists of 20 MEMU rake coaches.

== Rake sharing ==
The train shares its rake with 69153/69154 Umargam Road–Valsad MEMU and 69151/69152 Valsad–Surat MEMU.
