= Gujarat Queen =

Train in India

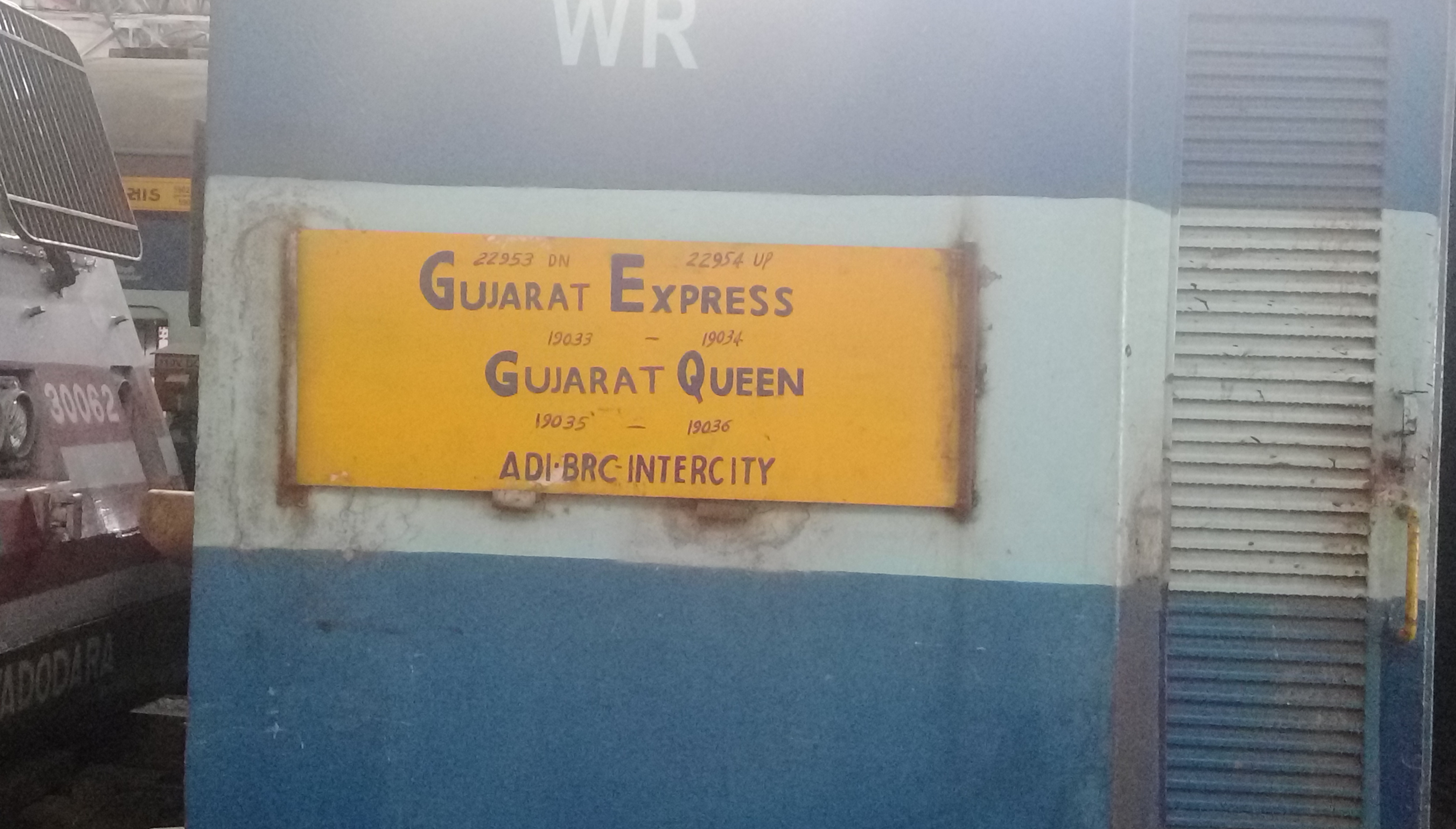
- Gujarat Queen train board.

Overview
- Service type: Express
- Locale: Gujarat
- Current operator: Western Railway

Route
- Termini: Valsad (BL); Ahmedabad (ADI)
- Stops: 27
- Distance travelled: 298 km (185 mi)
- Average journey time: 6 hrs 20 mins
- Service frequency: Daily
- Train number: 19033 / 19034

On-board services
- Classes: AC Chair Car, First Class, Second Class Seating, General Unreserved
- Seating arrangements: Yes
- Sleeping arrangements: Yes (First Class only)
- Catering facilities: On-board catering, E-catering
- Observation facilities: Rake sharing with: 22953/22954 Gujarat Superfast Express, 19035/19036 Vadodara–Ahmedabad Intercity Express
- Baggage facilities: Available

Technical
- Rolling stock: ICF coach
- Track gauge: 1,676 mm (5 ft 6 in)
- Operating speed: 110 km/h (68 mph) maximum, 49 km/h (30 mph) average including halts.

The 19033 / 19034 Gujarat Queen is an Express train belonging to Indian Railways that run between Valsad and Ahmedabad Junction in India. It operates as train number 19033 from Valsad to Ahmedabad Junction and as train number 19034 in the reverse direction.

== Coaches ==
Gujarat Queen presently has 3 AC Chair Car, 8 2nd Class seating & 6 General Unreserved coaches. It was hauled by WAP-5 just like original Gujarat Express

As with most train services in India, coach composition may be amended at the discretion of Indian Railways depending on demand.

== Service ==
19033 Gujarat Queen covers the distance of 298 kilometres in 6 hours 20 mins (48.32 km/h) & 6 hours 30 mins as 19034 Gujarat Queen (48.99 km/h).

As the average speed of the train is below 55 km/h, as per Indian Railways rules, its fare does not include a Superfast surcharge.

== Route and halts ==
The important halts of the train are:

- Valsad
- Dungri
- Bilimora Junction
- Amalsad
- Navsari
- Maroli
- Sachin
- Udhna Junction
- Surat
- Sayan
- Kim
- Kosamba Junction
- Panoli
- Ankleshwar Junction
- Bharuch Junction
- Nabipur
- Palej
- Miyagam Karjan Junction
- Vadodara Junction
- Vasad Junction
- Anand Junction
- Nadiad Junction
- Mahemadavad Kheda Road
- Barejadi Nandej
- Maninagar
- Ahmedabad Junction

== Schedule ==
Train number	Station code	Departure station	Departure time	Departure day	Arrival station	Arrival time	Arrival day
19033	BL	Valsad	04:05 AM	Daily	Ahmedabad Junction	10:25 AM	Daily
19034	ADI	Ahmedabad Junction	18:10 PM	Daily	Valsad	12:40 AM	Daily

== Gallery ==
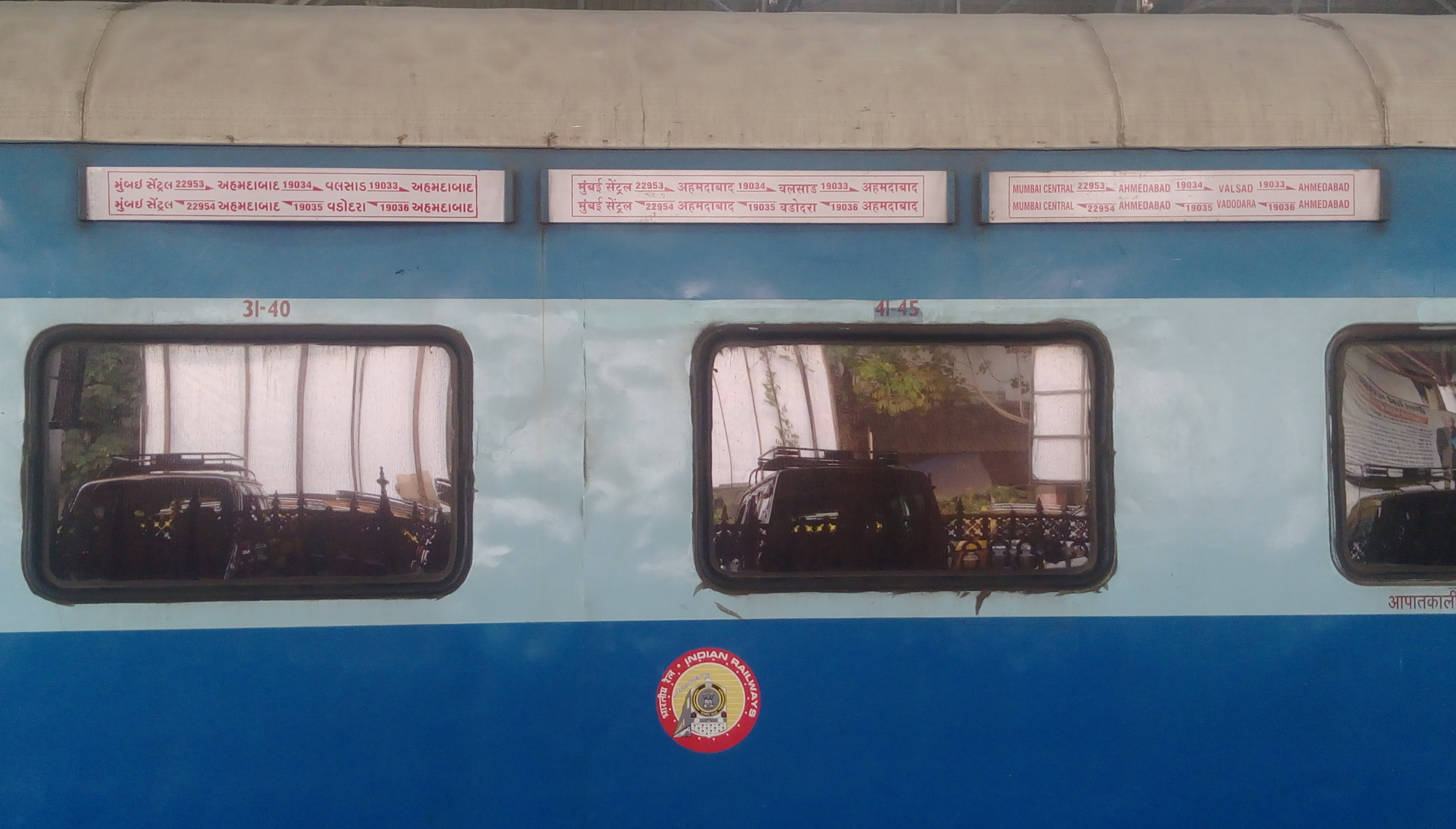
Gujarat Queen Express – AC Chair Car coach

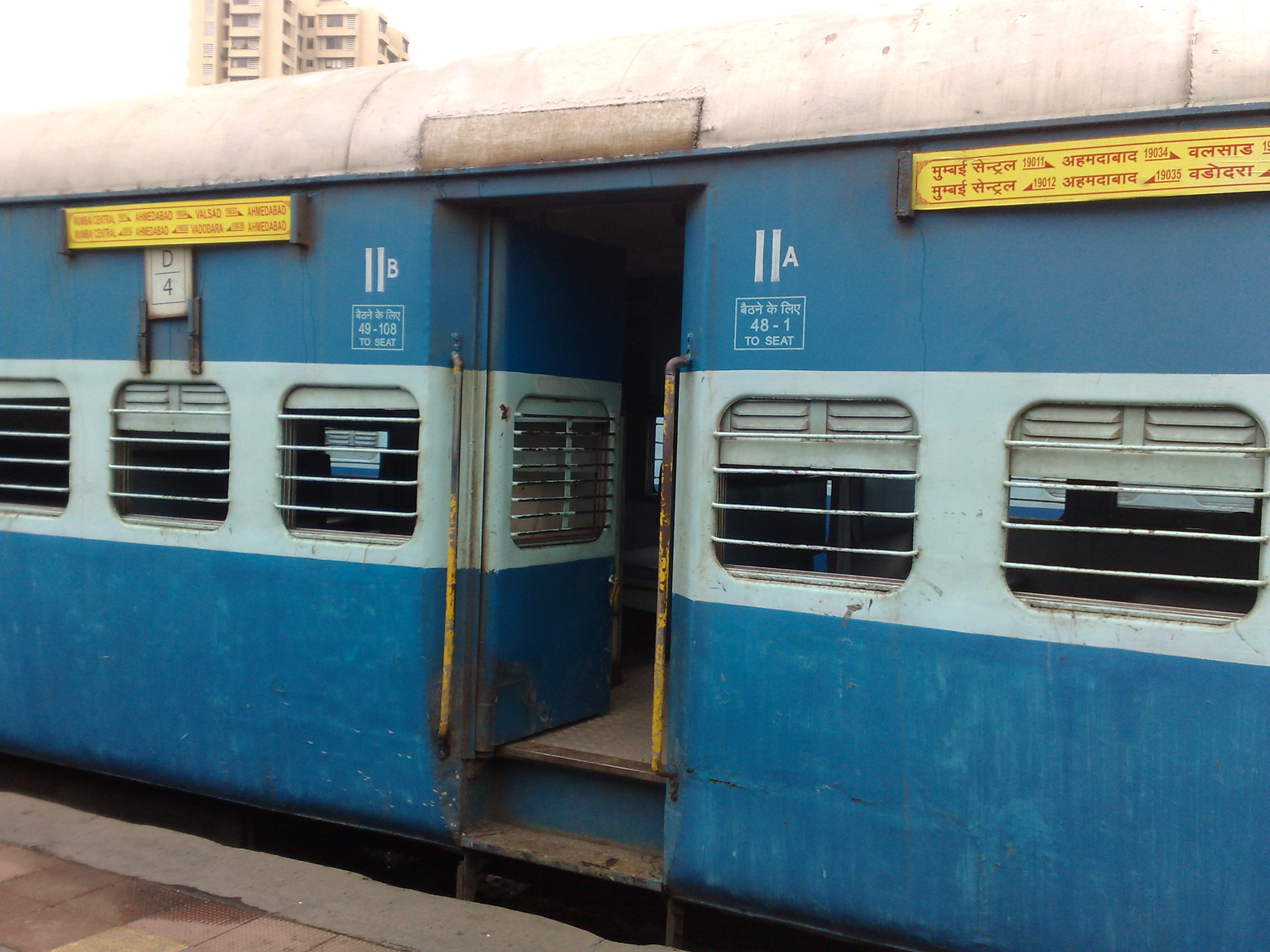
Gujarat Queen Express – 2nd Class seating coach

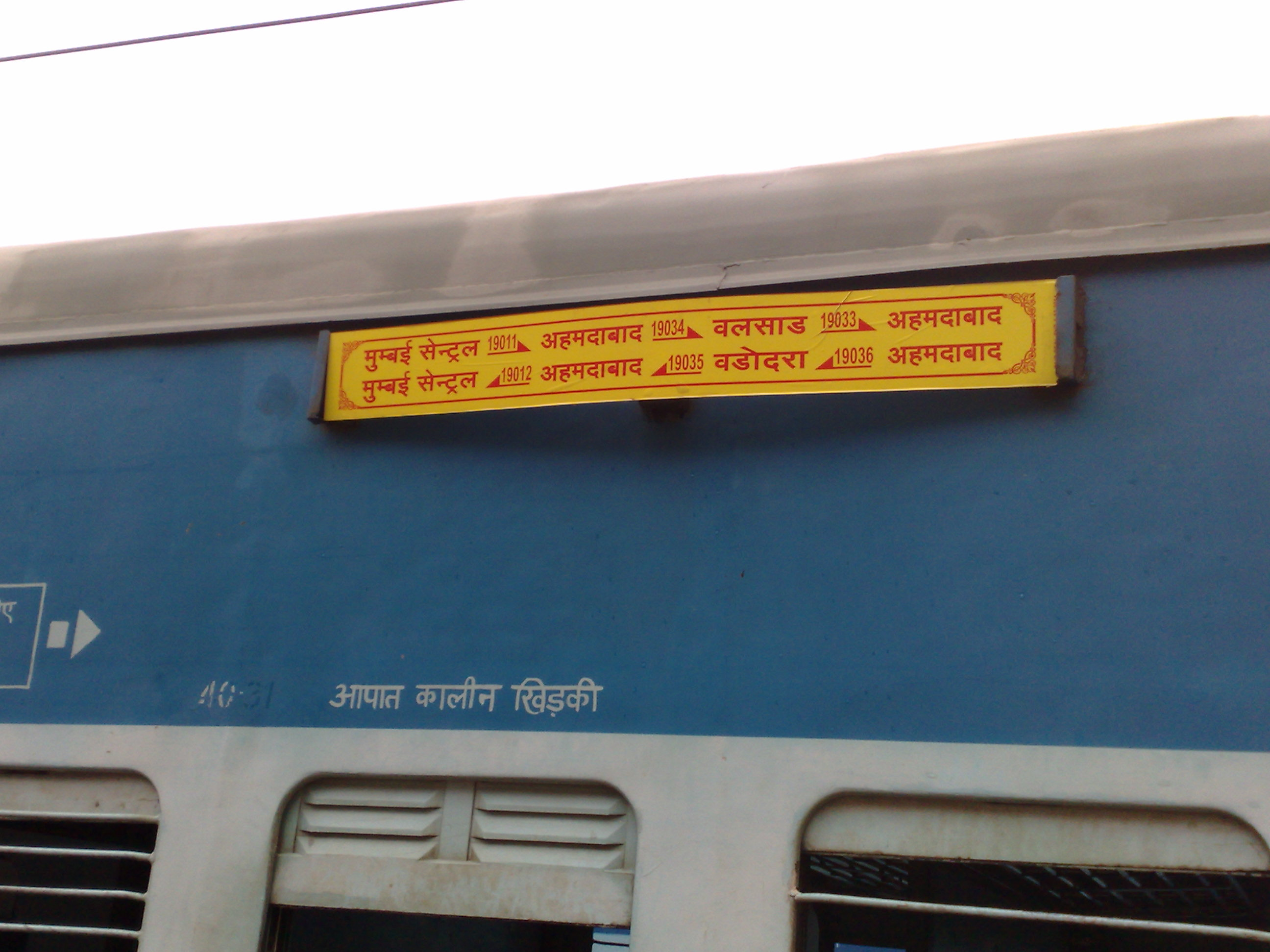
Gujarat Queen Express – Coach board

== Traction ==
It is hauls from end to end by a Valsad Loco Shed or Vatva Loco Shed-based WAP-4 or Vadodara Loco Shed-based WAP-5 electric locomotive.
