= Makarpura railway station =

Railway station in Gujarat, India

Makarpura

General information
- Location: Makarpura, Vadodara district, Gujarat; India
- Coordinates: 22°14′01″N 73°10′33″E
- Elevation: 33 metres (108 ft)
- System: Indian Railway Station
- Owner: Ministry of Railways, Indian Railways
- Operator: Western Railway
- Lines: New Delhi–Mumbai main line Ahmedabad–Mumbai main line
- Platforms: 4
- Tracks: 4

Construction
- Structure type: Standard (On Ground)
- Parking: No

Other information
- Status: Functioning
- Station code: MPR
- Zone(s): Western Railway
- Division(s): Vadodara
Location
- Location within India Location within Gujarat

Makarpura railway station is a small railway station on the Western Railway network in the state of Gujarat, India. It serves Makarpura area of Vadodara city. Makarpura railway station is 9 km from Vadodara Junction. Passenger and MEMU trains halt here.
