= Dahanu Road–Vadodara Superfast Express =

Train in India

Overview
- Service type: Superfast
- Locale: Gujarat & Maharashtra
- Current operator: Western Railway

Route
- Termini: Dahanu Road (DRD); Vadodara (BRC)
- Stops: 14
- Distance travelled: 273 km (170 mi)
- Average journey time: 4 hrs 55 mins
- Service frequency: Daily (Note: Runs seven days in a week for every direction.)
- Train number: 22929 / 22930

On-board services
- Classes: Monthly Season Ticket 1st Class, Monthly Season Ticket 2nd Class, General Unreserved
- Seating arrangements: Yes
- Sleeping arrangements: No
- Auto-rack arrangements: Overhead racks
- Catering facilities: No
- Observation facilities: Large windows
- Baggage facilities: No
- Other facilities: Below the seats

Technical
- Rolling stock: LHB coach
- Track gauge: 1,676 mm (5 ft 6 in)
- Operating speed: 57 km/h (35 mph) average including halts.

The 22929 / 22930 Dahanu Road–Vadodara Superfast Express is a superfast express train belonging to Western Railway zone that runs between Dahanu Road and Vadodara Junction in India. It is currently being operated with 22929/22930 train numbers on a daily basis.

== Service ==
- 22929/Dahanu Road–Vadodara Superfast Express has an average speed of 55 km/h (34 mph) and covers 273 km (170 mi) in 4 hrs 55 mins.
- 22930/Vadodara–Dahanu Road Superfast Express has an average speed of 58 km/h (36 mph) and covers 273 km (170 mi) in 4 hrs 45 mins.

== Route and halts ==
The important halts of the train are:

- Dahanu Road
- Umargam Road
- Bhilad
- Vapi
- Valsad
- Bilimora Junction
- Navsari
- Surat
- Kim
- Kosamba Junction
- Ankleshwar Junction
- Bharuch Junction
- Palej
- Miyagam Karjan Junction
- Vishvamitri
- Vadodara Junction

== Coach composition ==
The train has LHB rakes with max speed of 130 km/h. The train consists of 13 coaches:

- 1 First Class Non-AC
- 10 General Unreserved
- 2 SLR cum EoG.

== Traction ==
Both trains are hauled by a Vadodara Loco Shed based WAP-7 or Valsad Loco Shed based WAP-4 electric locomotive from Dahanu Road to Vadodara and vice versa.

== See also ==
- Dahanu Road railway station
- Vadodara Junction railway station
