= Valsad–Vadodara Intercity Superfast Express =

Train in India

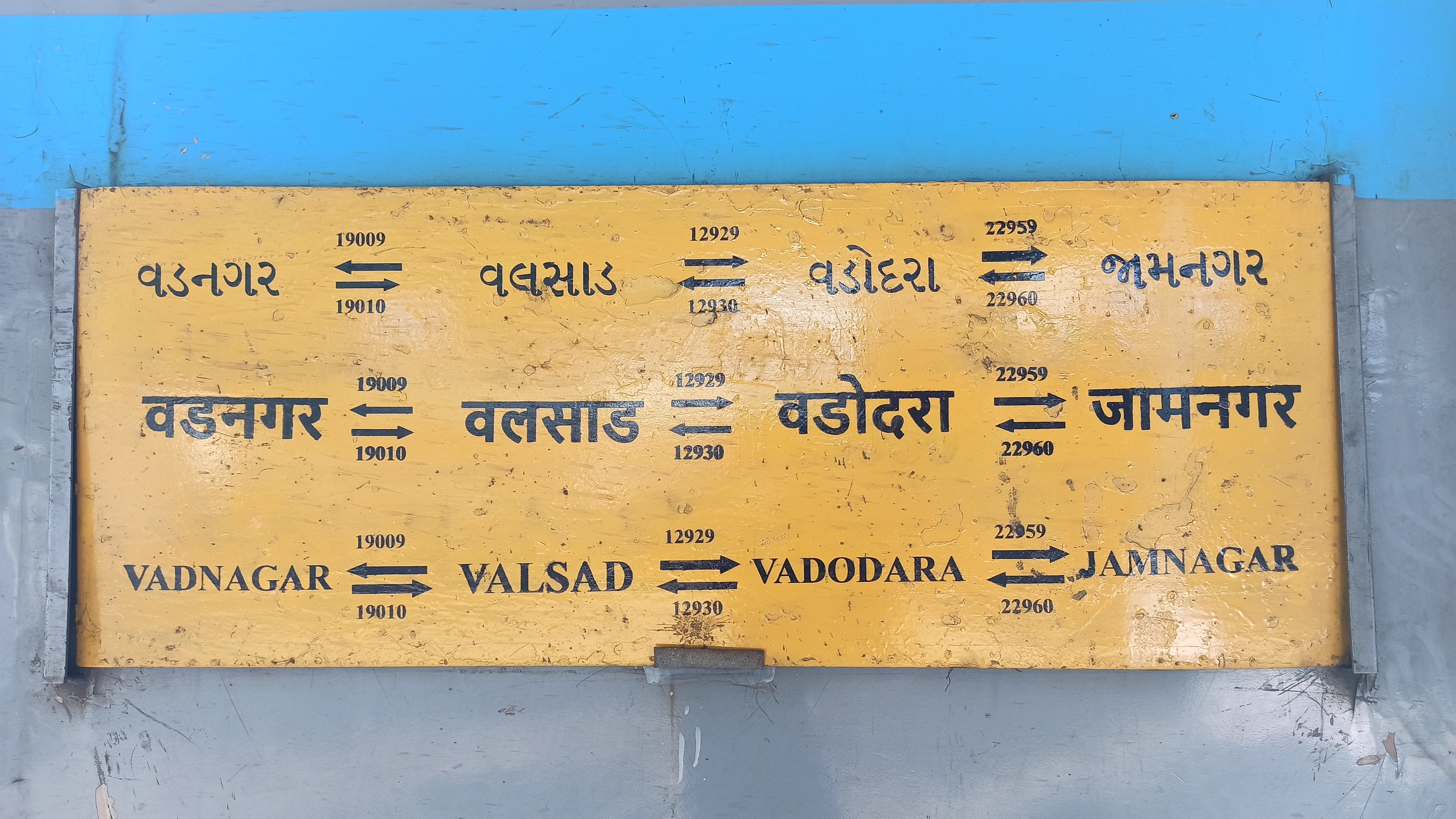

Overview
- Service type: Superfast Express
- Locale: Gujarat
- First service: 1 July 1992; 34 years ago
- Current operator: Western Railway

Route
- Termini: Valsad (BL); Vadodara (BRC)
- Stops: 11
- Distance travelled: 199 km (124 mi)
- Average journey time: 03 hours 20 minutes
- Service frequency: Daily
- Train number: 12929 / 12930

On-board services
- Classes: AC Chair Car, Second Seating, General Unreserved
- Seating arrangements: Yes
- Sleeping arrangements: No
- Auto-rack arrangements: Overhead racks
- Catering facilities: No
- Observation facilities: Large windows
- Other facilities: Below the seats

Technical
- Rolling stock: LHB coach
- Track gauge: 1,676 mm (5 ft 6 in)
- Operating speed: 56 km/h (35 mph) average including halts

The 12929 / 12930 Valsad–Vadodara Intercity Superfast Express is a superfast express train of the Indian Railways connecting Valsad and Vadodara of Gujarat. It is operated with train numbers 12929/12930 on a daily basis.

This train was previously running between Valsad and Vadodara Junction, but the train was extended up to Dahod by Ministry of Railways in 2011. It runs to Vadodara Junction.

== Coach composition ==
The train has standard rakes with maximum speed of 110 km/h (68 mph). The train consists of 22 coaches:

- 2 Luggage cum Brake vans
- 2 AC Chair Car
- 10 Second Seating
- 8 General Unreserved

== Service ==
- 12929/Valsad–Vadodara Intercity Superfast Express has an average speed of 60 km/h (37 mph) and covers 199 km (124 mi) in 3 hours 20 minutes.
- 12930/Vadodara–Valsad Intercity Superfast Express has an average speed of 55 km/h (34 mph) and covers 199 km (124 mi) in 3 hours 35 minutes.

== Route & halts ==
The important halts of the train are:

- Valsad
- Bilimora Junction
- Amalsad
- Navsari
- Maroli
- Surat
- Kim
- Kosamba Junction
- Ankleshwar Junction
- Bharuch Junction
- Palej
- Miyagam Karjan Junction
- Vadodara Junction

== Schedule ==
Train number	Station code	Departure station	Departure time	Departure day	Arrival station	Arrival time	Arrival day
12929	BL	Valsad	07:15	Daily	Vadodara	10:35	Daily
12930	BRC	Vadodara	17:10	Daily	Valsad	20:45	Daily

== Traction ==
Both trains are hauled by a Vadodara Loco Shed based WAP-5 / WAP-7 locomotive from end to end.

== Rake sharing ==
The train shares its rake with;

- 22959/22960 Vadodara–Jamnagar Intercity Superfast Express
- 20959/20960 Valsad–Vadnagar Intercity Superfast Express
