= Ankleshwar–Rajpipla Passenger =

Train in India

Overview
- Service type: Passenger
- Locale: Gujarat
- First service: February 3, 2014; 11 years ago
- Current operator(s): Western Railway

Route
- Termini: Ankleshwar Junction (AKV); Rajpipla (RAJ)
- Stops: 12
- Distance travelled: 63 km (39 mi)
- Average journey time: 2h 45m
- Service frequency: Daily (Note: Runs seven days in a week for every direction.)
- Train number(s): 59167/59168

On-board services
- Class(es): Unreserved
- Seating arrangements: Yes
- Sleeping arrangements: No
- Catering facilities: No
- Observation facilities: ICF coach
- Entertainment facilities: No
- Baggage facilities: Below the seats

Technical
- Rolling stock: 2
- Track gauge: 5 ft 6 in (1,676 mm)
- Electrification: No
- Operating speed: 23 km/h (14 mph) average with halts

The Ankleshwar–Rajpipla Passenger is a Passenger train belonging to Western Railway zone that runs between Ankleshwar Junction and Rajpipla. It is currently being operated with 59167/59168 train numbers on a daily basis.

== Average speed and frequency ==
- The 59167/Ankleshwar–Rajpipla Passenger runs with an average speed of 23 km/h and completes 63 km in 2h 45m. The 59168/Rajpipla–Ankleshwar Passenger runs with an average speed of 23 km/h and completes 63 km in 2h 45m.

== Route and halts ==
The important halts of the train are:

- Ankleshwar Junction
- Ankleshwar Udyognagar
- Jhagadiya Junction
- Rajpipla

== Coach composite ==
The train has standard ICF rakes with max speed of 110 kmph. The train consists of 7 coaches:

- 5 General Unreserved
- 2 Seating cum Luggage Rake

== Traction ==
Both trains are hauled by a Vatva Loco Shed-based WDM-3A diesel locomotive from Ankleshwar to Rajpipla and vice versa.

== See also ==
- Ankleshwar Junction railway station
- Rajpipla railway station
