= Dahej railway station =

Railway station in Gujarat, India

General information
- Location: Dahej, Gujarat; India
- Coordinates: 21°42′33″N 72°35′22″E
- Elevation: 8 metres (26 ft)
- System: Indian Railway Station
- Owner: Ministry of Railways, Indian Railways
- Operator: Western Railway
- Line: Bharuch–Dahej line
- Platforms: 1
- Tracks: 1

Construction
- Structure type: Standard (On Ground)
- Parking: No

Other information
- Status: Functioning
- Station code: DGFJ
- Zone(s): Western Railway
- Division(s): Vadodara
Location
- Location within India Location within Gujarat

Dahej railway station is a railway station on the Western Railway network in the state of Gujarat, India. Dahej railway station is 62 km far away from Bharuch Junction railway station. One MEMU train starts from here.

== Trains ==
- Dahej - Bharuch MEMU

== See also ==
- Bharuch district
