= Surat–Bharuch MEMU =

Overview
- Service type: MEMU
- Current operator(s): Western Railway zone

Route
- Termini: Surat (ST); Bharuch Junction (BH)
- Stops: 10
- Distance travelled: 59 km (37 mi)
- Average journey time: 1 hrs 30 mins
- Service frequency: Daily
- Train number(s): 69171/69172

On-board services
- Class(es): Unreserved
- Seating arrangements: Yes
- Sleeping arrangements: No
- Catering facilities: No
- Entertainment facilities: No

Technical
- Rolling stock: 2
- Track gauge: 1,676 mm (5 ft 6 in)
- Operating speed: 38 km/h (24 mph)

The 69171/69172 Surat–Bharuch MEMU is a MEMU train of the Indian Railways connecting Surat and Bharuch Junction of Gujarat. It is currently being operated with 69171/69172 train numbers on a daily basis.

== Service ==
- 69171/Surat–Bharuch MEMU has average speed of 42 km/h and covers 59 km in 1 hrs 25 min.
- 69172/Bharuch–Surat MEMU has average speed of 35 km/h and covers 59 km in 1 hrs 40 min.

== Route ==
The 69171/72 Surat–Bharuch MEMU runs from Surat via Utran, Sayan, Kim, Kosamba Junction, Ankleshwar Junction to Bharuch Junction, and vice versa.

== Coach composition ==
The train consists of 20 MEMU rake coaches.
