= Kosad railway station =

Railway Station in Gujarat, India

General information
- Location: Kosad, Surat district, Gujarat; India
- Coordinates: 21°15′39″N 72°52′03″E
- System: Indian Railway Station
- Owner: Ministry of Railways, Indian Railways
- Operator: Western Railway
- Lines: New Delhi–Mumbai main line Ahmedabad–Mumbai main line
- Platforms: 3
- Tracks: 3

Construction
- Structure type: Standard (On Ground)
- Parking: No

Other information
- Status: Functioning
- Station code: KSE
- Zone(s): Western Railway
- Division(s): Vadodara
Location
- Location within India Location within Gujarat

Kosad railway station is a railway station on the Western Railway network in the state of Gujarat, India. It serves Kosad town. Kosad railway station is 7 km from Surat. Passenger and MEMU trains halt here.
