= CVJ =

CVJ may refer to:

- Chavaj railway station (station code), Gujarat, India
- Cuernavaca Airport (IATA code), Temixco, Morelos, Mexico
- Constant-velocity joint
