= PLJ =

PLJ may refer to:

- PLJ, the IATA code for Placencia Airport, Belize
- PLJ, the Indian Railways station code for Palej railway station, Gujarat, India
