= Ankleshwar Udyognagar railway station =

Railway station in Gujarat, India

General information
- Location: Gujarat State Highway 64, Hifazat Nagar, Ankleshwar, Bharuch district, Gujarat; India
- Coordinates: 21.633484°N 73.033764°E
- Elevation: 22 metres (72 ft)
- System: Indian Railways station
- Owner: Indian Railways
- Operator: Western Railway
- Line: Ankleshwar–Rajpipla section
- Platforms: 1
- Tracks: 2

Construction
- Structure type: Standard (on-ground station)
- Parking: No
- Cycle facilities: No

Other information
- Status: Single diesel line
- Station code: AKVU
- Zone(s): Western Railway
- Division(s): Vadodara
Location
- Location within Gujarat Location within India

Ankleshwar Udyognagar railway station is a small railway station in Bharuch district, Gujarat. Its code is AKVU. It serves Ankleshwar town. The station consists of 1 platforms. The platform is not well sheltered. It lacks many facilities including water and sanitation.

== Trains ==
- Ankleshwar–Rajpipla Passenger
