= Kosamba =

- City
- Location in Gujarat, India Kosamba (India)
- Coordinates: 21.48°N 72.95°E
- Country: India
- State: Gujarat

Government
  - Mayor: not elected
- Elevation: 13 m (43 ft)

Population (2011)
  - Total: 50,568

Languages
  - Official: Gujarati, Hindi
- Time zone: UTC+5:30 (IST)
- Postal code: 394120
- Telephone code: 02629
- Vehicle registration: GJ5, GJ19

Kosamba is a city and a municipality situated in the Mangrol Taluka in Surat district in the Indian state of Gujarat. Kosamba comes under Surat Metropolitan Region. Kosamba consists of the twin towns of (1)Tarsadi Nagarpalika and (2) Kosamba Gram Panchayat. Of these two municipalities, Tarasadi is larger than Kosamba. Though they have independent civic bodies, both are generally known as Kosamba.

== Geography ==
Kosamba is located at 21.48°N 72.95°E. It has an average elevation of 30 metres

== Transport ==
Kosamba is well linked to NH-48& GJ SH 166 and it has a railway station which has connectivity to Mumbai and Ahmedabad.

=== Rail ===
Kosamba Junction is a major junction where local and express trains like the Lok Shakti Express and Saurashtra Janata Express stop. Most of the villages surrounded depends on Kosamba Junction for Rail.

== Education ==
There are few government schools also operating which includes Shree V. S. Patel High School, M. M. Karodia School etc. and giving schooling to students of the town as well as surrounded villages. From 2016 to 2017 Shree V. S. Patel Highschool has also opened a Science college and from next year they are planning to open a Commerce college also in Kosamba (Tarsadi). A Y Dadabhai Technical Institute is a self-financed-institute offering Diploma Engineering courses in various branches. P.P. Savani University with 100 acres campus has opened up near Kosamba.

ABPS (Aditya Birla Public School) is 5 km away in a nearby village known as Kharach. It is a private school under the multinational company, Birla. Originally this school was opened only for children living in the Birla housing colony but soon students from Kosamba town started flowing in.

Today more than 70% of the students are from Kosamba and have made the school's name famous among all nine ABPS schools spread across India. There are English medium school like A.E Dawoodjee English medium school and E. E Dawoodjee English medium school also.

== See also ==
- List of tourist attractions in Surat
