= Tarasadi =

- town
- Location in Gujarat, India Tarasadi (India)
- Coordinates: 21.095711°N 72.822533°E
- Country: India
- State: Gujarat
- District: Surat
- Talukas: Mangrol

Area
  - Total: 15.12 km^{2} (5.84 sq mi)
- Elevation: 23 m (75 ft)

Population (2009)
  - Total: 25,589
  - Density: 16,000/km^{2} (41,000/sq mi)

Languages
  - Official: Gujarati, Hindi
- Time zone: UTC+5:30 (IST)
- PIN: 394120
- Telephone code: 02629
- Vehicle registration: GJ-5/GJ-19
- Sex ratio: 964/1000 males ♂/♀
- Website: gujaratindia.com

Tarasadi is a city and municipality in Surat district in the Indian state of Gujarat. The town is located 45 km northeast of Surat on Surat-Mumbai highway near Kosamba.

== Geography ==
The city is located at an average elevation of 12 metres (66 feet).

== Demographics ==
As of 2001 India census, Tarasadi had a population of 19567. Males constitute 51% of the population and females 49%. Tarsadi has an average literacy rate of 74%, higher than the national average of 59.5%: male literacy is 81%, and female literacy is 63%. In Tarsadi, 14% of the population is under 6 years of age.

== See also ==
- List of tourist attractions in Surat
