= Kim, Gujarat =

Kim
- Town
- Location in Gujarat, India Kim (India)
- Coordinates: 21.403145°N 72.924963°E
- Country: India
- State: Gujarat
- District: Surat
- Elevation: 17 m (56 ft)

Population (2011)
  - Total: 18,638

Languages
  - Official: Gujarati, Hindi
- Time zone: UTC+5:30 (IST)
- PIN: 394110
- Vehicle registration: GJ05
- Website: gujaratindia.com

Kim is a census town in Surat district in the Indian state of Gujarat.

== Demographics ==
As of 2011 India census, Kim had a population of 18,638. Males constitute 53.49% of the population and females 46.51%. Kim has an average literacy rate of 89.25%: male literacy is 92.74%, and female literacy is 85.22%. In Kim, 12.38% of the population is under 6 years of age.

== Transport ==
=== Railway ===
Kim railway station is located on the Western Railway Mumbai – Vadodara Segment. It is 24 km from Surat, 105 km from Vadodara.
