= Bharuch–Dahej line =

Railway line in Gujarat, India

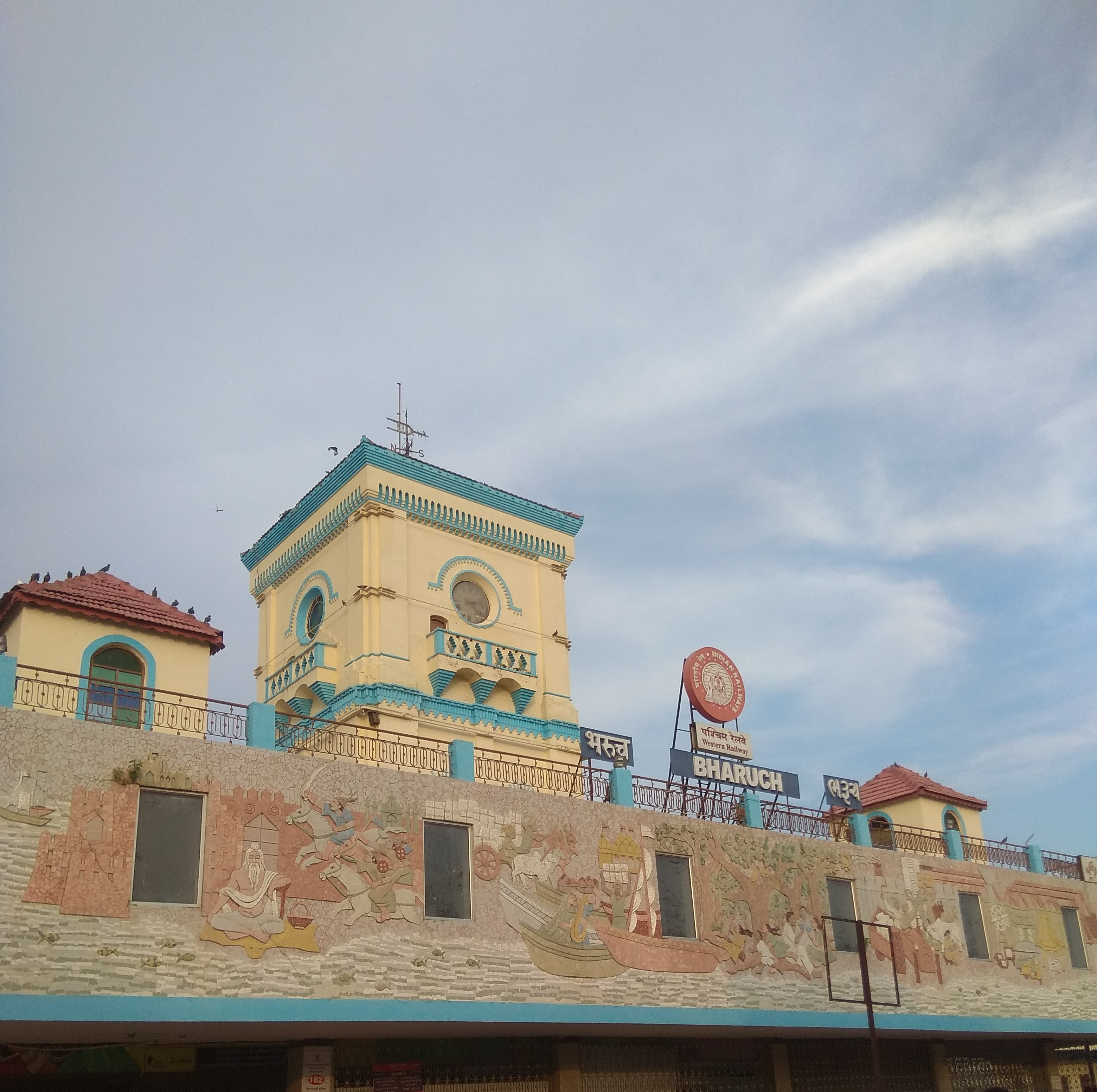
- Bharuch Junction railway station

Overview
- Status: Operational
- Owner: Indian Railways
- Locale: Gujarat
- Termini: Bharuch; Dahej
- Stations: 4

Service
- System: Indian Railways
- Operator: Western Railway

Technical
- Line length: 62 km (39 mi)
- Num of tracks: 1
- Track gauge: 5 ft 6 in (1,676 mm) broad gauge
- Electrification: Yes

The Bharuch–Dahej line belongs to the Vadodara division of Western Railway zone in Gujarat state.

== History ==
The Bharuch–Jambusar branch (47 km (29 mi)) was opened in 1914, and the Samni–Dahej branch (39 km (24 mi)) was opened in 1930. The foundation stone for the gauge conversion of the Bharuch–Dahej line was laid in 2008. The narrow-gauge to broad-gauge conversion of the line was completed in 2011, and regular train operations started in 2012.
