= Palej railway station =

Railway station in Gujarat, India

General information
- Location: Palej, Gujarat; India
- Coordinates: 21°55′16″N 73°04′21″E
- Elevation: 28 metres (92 ft)
- System: Indian Railway Station
- Owner: Ministry of Railways, Indian Railways
- Operator: Western Railway
- Lines: New Delhi–Mumbai main line Ahmedabad–Mumbai main line
- Platforms: 4
- Tracks: 4

Construction
- Structure type: Standard (On Ground)
- Parking: No

Other information
- Status: Functioning
- Station code: PLJ
- Zone(s): Western Railway
- Division(s): Vadodara
Location
- Location within India Location within Gujarat

Palej railway station is a railway station on the Western Railway network in the state of Gujarat, India. Palej railway station is 26 km far away from Bharuch railway station. Passenger, MEMU and few Express/Superfast trains halt at Palej railway station.

== Nearby stations ==
Varediya is nearest railway station towards Mumbai, whereas Lakodra Dethan is nearest railway station towards Vadodara.

== Major trains ==
Following Express/Superfast trains halt at Palej railway station in both direction:

- 19033/34 Valsad - Ahmedabad Gujarat Queen Express
- 12929/30 Valsad - Dahod Intercity Superfast Express
- 19023/24 Mumbai Central - Firozpur Janata Express
- 19215/16 Mumbai Central - Porbandar Saurashtra Express
- 22929/30 Bhilad - Vadodara Superfast Express
- 22953/54 Mumbai Central - Ahmedabad Gujarat Superfast Express
- 19115/16 Dadar - Bhuj Sayajinagari Express

== See also ==
- Bharuch district
