= Vishvamitri railway station =

Railway station in Gujarat, India

Vishvamitri

General information
- Location: Vadodara, Gujarat; India
- Coordinates: 22°17′04″N 73°10′44″E
- Elevation: 33 metres (108 ft)
- System: Indian Railways station
- Owner: Ministry of Railways, Indian Railways
- Operator: Western Railway
- Lines: New Delhi–Mumbai main line Ahmedabad–Mumbai main line
- Platforms: 4
- Tracks: 4

Construction
- Structure type: Standard (on ground)
- Parking: No

Other information
- Status: Functioning
- Station code: VS
- Zone(s): Western Railway
- Division(s): Vadodara

History
- Former names: Goya Gate

Services
Preceding station	Indian Railways	Following station
Vadodara Junction towards ?	New Delhi–Mumbai main line	Makarpura towards ?
Location
- Location within India Location within Gujarat

Vishvamitri railway station is a railway station on the Western Railway network in the state of Gujarat, India. Vishvamitri railway station is 3 km (1.9 mi) from Vadodara railway station. Passenger, MEMU, and few Express/Superfast trains halt at Vishvamitri railway station.

== Trains ==
Following Express/Superfast trains halt at Vishvamitri railway station in both directions:

- 19215/16 Saurashtra Express
- 22929/30 Bhilad–Vadodara Superfast Express
- 19115/16 Sayajinagari Express
- 12927 Vadodara Express

== See also ==
- Vadodara district
