= Nabipur, Gujarat =

Nabipur
- Village
- Location in Gujarat, India Nabipur (India)
- Coordinates: 21.807811°N 73.035337°E
- Country: India
- State: Gujarat
- District: Bharuch

Population (2011)
  - Total: 6,064

Languages
  - Official: Gujarati, Hindi
- Time zone: UTC+5:30 (IST)
- PIN: 392210
- Vehicle registration: GJ
- Website: gujaratindia.com

Nabipur is a village in Bharuch district in the Indian state of Gujarat.

== Demographics ==
As of 2011 India census, Nabipur had a population of 6,064. Males constitute 51.34% of the population and females 48.66%. Nabipur has an average literacy rate of 82.03%: male literacy is 87.81%, and female literacy is 75.91%. In Nabipur, 10.07% of the population is under 6 years of age.

== Transport ==
=== Railway ===
Nabipur railway station is located on the Western Railway Mumbai – Vadodara Segment. It is 12 km from Bharuch, 58 km from Vadodara.
