= Utran =

- Census town
- Location in Gujarat, India Utran (India)
- Coordinates: 21.23°N 72.87°E
- Country: India
- State: Gujarat
- District: Surat
- Elevation: 12 m (39 ft)

Population (2001)
  - Total: 12,894

Languages
  - Official: Gujarati, Hindi
- Time zone: UTC+5:30 (IST)
- Postal code: 394105
- Vehicle registration: GJ 5
- Website: gujaratindia.com

Utran is a census town situated in Surat district alongside Tapi river in the Indian state of Gujarat. Utran's Nearest airport is Surat (21.9 km). Nearest railway station is Utran Railway station.the first railway in Gujarat started from Utran to ankleshwar.

== Geography ==
Utran is located at 21.23°N 72.87°E. It has an average elevation of 12 metres (39 feet).

== Demographics ==
As of 2001 India census, Utran had a population of 12,894. Males constitute 54% of the population and females 46%. Utran has an average literacy rate of 73%, higher than the national average of 59.5%: male literacy is 80%, and female literacy is 64%. In Utran, 13% of the population is under 6 years of age.

== See also ==
- List of tourist attractions in Surat
