= Makarpura Palace =

Coordinates: 22.2412°N 73.1949°E

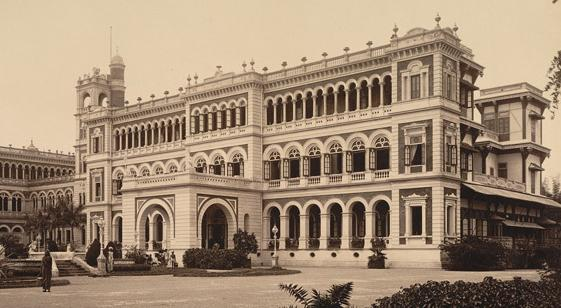

General information
- Location: Vadodara, Gujarat, India
- Completed: 1870

Makarpura Palace is a royal palace of Gaekwads of the Baroda State, in present-day Vadodara, Gujarat, India. It was built by Maharaja Khende Rao in 1870, in the Italian style. It was used as summer residence and hunting resort by the Royal Family. The palace is now used as a training school called No.17 Tetra School by the Indian Air Force.

== History ==
In 1866, a Maharaja of Baroda, Khande Rao, built an entire new palace finished in 1870. It is said that Malhar Rao Gaekwad, brother of Khanderao II Gaekwad, who ruled Baroda from 1856 to 1870, destroyed a portion of this palace. It was extended and renovated by Maharaja Sayajirao Gaekwad III, between 1883-1890 and designed by Robert Fellowes Chisholm (1840-1915) in the same Italian Renaissance style. The palace was used as a training school by the Indian Air Force for many years.

== Location ==
Khanderao II Gaekwad spent a lot of time at Dhaniavi which is near Makarpura; it was then called Shikarkhana. Due to its proximity to deer reserves, the palace site was selected at Makarpura.

== Structure and Landscape ==
The palace is a three-storey structure which is divided into two parts. One part was built by Khanderao II Gaekwad whereas the other part was built by Maharaja Sayajirao Gaekwad III. Both parts look the same and reflect Italian renaissance architecture. Both these parts are connected by corridors at the ground and first floor levels. There is also a single-storey porte-cochere with Italian-style multifoil fountains.

It has more than one hundred ornate brick rooms, along with frame-arch balconies and wooden staircases. The size of the arch gets smaller as it goes up.

The rear portion of the palace consists of series of terraces which are connected by staircases and are shaded by chhajjas.

The palace has a Japanese-style garden which is spread across 130 acres. It is designed by William Goldring, the architect of the royal botanical gardens. The garden was named Kew and featured a swimming pool and a lake with swans. There were ivory fountains which were activated to welcome the king when he visited the palace.

The interior of the palace, which once featured painted ceilings, grand wooden staircases, stucco panels, chandeliers, and wooden furniture, is currently in a very dilapidated condition.

== In popular culture ==
The 1924 silent film Prithvi Vallabh was shot around the palace.

== See also ==
- Makarpura, industrial area in Vadodara
