= Ankleshwar–Rajpipla section =

Railway section in India

Overview
- Status: Operational
- Owner: Indian Railways
- Locale: Gujarat
- Termini: Ankleshwar; Rajpipla
- Stations: 12

Service
- Operator: Western Railway

History
- Opened: 1897

Technical
- Track length: 62 km (39 mi)
- Num of tracks: 1
- Track gauge: 5 ft 6 in (1,676 mm) broad gauge
- Electrification: Ongoing

The Ankleshwar–Rajpipla section belongs to Vadodara Division of Western Railway zone in Gujarat State.

== History ==
The Ankleshwar–Raj Pardi branch was opened in 1897, covering a length of 30 km. The Raj Pardi–Umalla branch was opened in 1899, covering a length of 8 km. Umalla-Amletha and Amletha-Rajpipla branch was opened in 1899 and 1917 respectively.

Foundation stone for Ankleshwar–Rajpipla section Gauge conversion was laid in 2008. The Narrow gauge to Broad gauge conversion of Ankleshwar–Rajpipla section was completed in 2013.
