= Chalthan railway station =

Railway station in Gujrat, India

General information
- Location: Chalthan, Surat district India
- Coordinates: 21°09′27″N 72°57′23″E
- Elevation: 21 metres (69 ft)
- System: Indian Railways station
- Owner: Ministry of Railways, Indian Railways
- Operator: Western Railway
- Line: Udhna–Jalgaon line
- Platforms: 3
- Tracks: 3

Construction
- Structure type: Standard (on ground station)
- Parking: Yes

Other information
- Status: Functioning
- Station code: CHM
- Zone(s): Western Railway
- Division(s): Mumbai WR
Location
- Location within India Location within Gujarat

Chalthan railway station is a railway station in Surat district of Gujarat state of India. It is under Mumbai WR railway division of Western Railway zone of Indian Railways. Chalthan railway station is 15 km far away from Surat. It is located on Udhna – Jalgaon main line of the Indian Railways.

It is located at 21 m above sea level and has three platforms. As of 2016, electrified double broad-gauge railway line exists at this station. Passenger, MEMU trains halt here

== See also ==
- Surat district
