= Rajpipla railway station =

Railway station in Gujarat, India

Rajpipla
- Indian Railway Stations logo

General information
- Location: Gujarat State Highway 160, Rajpipla, Narmada district, Gujarat; India
- Coordinates: 21°52′41″N 73°30′14″E
- Elevation: 41 metres (135 ft)
- System: Indian Railways station
- Owner: Indian Railways
- Operator: Western Railway
- Line: Ankleshwar–Rajpipla section
- Platforms: 1
- Tracks: 2

Construction
- Structure type: Standard (on-ground station)
- Parking: No
- Cycle facilities: No

Other information
- Status: Inactive
- Station code: RAJ
- Zone(s): Western Railway
- Division(s): Vadodara

History
- Electrified: Ongoing
Location
- Location within India Location within Gujarat

Rajpipla railway station is a small railway station in Narmada district, Gujarat. Its code is RAJ. It serves Rajpipla town. The station consists of a single platform. The platform is not well sheltered. It lacks many facilities including water and sanitation.

== Trains ==
- Permanently closed

== See also ==
- Rajpipla State Railway
