= Makarpura =

Area in Vadodara, India

Makarpura is a major area in Vadodara city of the Gujarat state in India.

It is an important industrial area of Vadodara city having Gujarat Industrial and Development corporation (G.I.D.C), which comprises many important and large Multinational corporations like Siemens, Alstom, ABB, TBEA, Philips, Panasonic, FAG, Sterling Biotech, Sun Pharmaceuticals, Larsen & Toubro, General Electric, Bombardier, and GAGL (Gujarat Automotive Gears Limited). There are also a number of glass manufacturing companies in and around Vadodara, including Haldyn Glass, HNG Float Glass and PiramalGlass. the corporator of makarpura is Purnima vyas. Vadodara Chamber of Commerce and Industry is also situated in Makarpura.

The Makarpura Palace is a former Gaekwad royal palace in this locality. It was built by Maharaja Khande Rao in 1870, designed in the Italian style. It was extended and renovated by Maharaja Sayajirao Gaekwad III. The palace is now used as a training school called No.17 Tetra School by the Indian Air Force.

Makarpura area is also an important area of Vadodara city in terms of transportation as it has a railway station and a bus station. In March 2026, the bus depot was sealed by the local municipal body due to pending property tax issues.

== In the news ==
The area was in the news in July 2019, when a crockodile was spotted on the road in Makarpura area. In another incident early in 2026, a 20-year woman died after jumping from a building.
