= Miyagam Karjan Junction railway station =

Railway station in Gujarat, India

Miyagam Karjan Junction
- Indian Railways logo

General information
- Location: Nava Bazar, Karjan, Vadodara district, Gujarat; India
- Coordinates: 22°03′03″N 73°07′13″E
- Elevation: 30 metres (98 ft)
- System: Indian Railways station
- Owner: Indian Railways
- Operator: Western Railways
- Lines: Ahmedabad–Mumbai main line, New Delhi–Mumbai main line, Karjan–Dabhoi branch line
- Platforms: 5
- Tracks: 6
- Connections: Auto stand

Construction
- Structure type: Standard (on-ground)
- Parking: No
- Cycle facilities: No

Other information
- Status: Functioning
- Station code: MYG
- Zone(s): Western Railway zone
- Division(s): Vadodara
Location
- Location within Gujarat Location within India

Miyagam Karjan Junction railway station is a railway station in Vadodara district, Gujarat. Its code is MYG . It serves Karjan town. The station consists of 5 platforms. The platform is not well sheltered. It lacks many facilities including water and sanitation. Many Passenger, MEMU, Express and Superfast trains halt here.

== Major trains ==
Following Express/Superfast trains halt at Miyagam Karjan Junction railway station in both direction:

- 19033/34 Gujarat Queen
- 12929/30 Valsad–Vadodara Intercity Superfast Express
- 19015/16 Saurashtra Express
- 22929/30 Dahanu Road–Vadodara Superfast Express
- 22953/54 Gujarat Superfast Express
- 20907/08 Dadar–Bhuj Sayajinagari Express
- 19011/12 Valsad-Dahod Intercity Express
- 79461/62 Pratapnagar-Dabhoi-Miyagam Karjan DEMU
