= Chavaj railway station =

Railway station in Gujarat, India

General information
- Location: Chavaj, Bharuch district, Gujarat; India
- Coordinates: 21°45′01″N 73°00′33″E
- Elevation: 20 metres (66 ft)
- System: Indian Railway Station
- Owner: Ministry of Railways, Indian Railways
- Operator: Western Railway
- Lines: New Delhi–Mumbai main line Ahmedabad–Mumbai main line
- Platforms: 3
- Tracks: 3

Construction
- Structure type: Standard (On Ground)
- Parking: No

Other information
- Status: Functioning
- Station code: CVJ
- Zone(s): Western Railway
- Division(s): Vadodara
Location
- Location within India Location within Gujarat

Chavaj railway station is a small railway station on the Western Railway network in the state of Gujarat, India. It serves Chavaj village. Chavaj railway station is 5 km from Bharuch Junction. Passenger and MEMU trains halt here.
