= Kosad =

- town
- Location in Gujarat, India Kosad (India)
- Coordinates: 21.284416°N 72.876263°E
- Country: India
- State: Gujarat
- District: Surat

Area
  - Total: 5 km^{2} (1.9 sq mi)
- Elevation: 13 m (43 ft)

Population (2001)
  - Total: 25,778
  - Density: 16,000/km^{2} (41,000/sq mi)

Languages
  - Official: Gujarati, Hindi
- Time zone: UTC+5:30 (IST)
- Telephone code: 0261
- Vehicle registration: GJ-5
- Nearest city: Amroli
- Sex ratio: 864/1000 males ♂/♀
- Website: gujaratindia.com

Kosad is a town and municipality in Surat city in the Indian state of Gujarat.

== Geography ==
The city is located at an average elevation of 12 metres (39 ft).

== Demographics ==
As of the 2001 Indian census, Kosad had a population of 26,578. Males constitute 52% of the population and females 48%. Kosad has an average literacy rate of 74%, higher than the national average of 59.5%: male literacy is 81%, and female literacy is 63%. In Kosad, 14% of the population is under 6 years of age.

The said Town was included In limits of Surat Municipal Corporation w.e.f 14.02.2006.

== Transport ==
By road: Kosad is 9 kilometres (5.6 mi) from Udhana and 8 kilometres (5.0 mi) from Surat.

By air: Nearest airport is Surat which is 21 kilometres (13 mi) from Kosad.

== See also ==
- List of tourist attractions in Surat
