= Virar–Bharuch MEMU =

Indian train route

Overview
- Service type: Mainline Electric Multiple Unit
- Current operator: Western Railway zone

Route
- Termini: Virar (VR); Bharuch Junction (BH)
- Stops: 39
- Distance travelled: 267 km (166 mi)
- Average journey time: 6 hrs 45 mins
- Service frequency: Daily
- Train number: 19101/19102

On-board services
- Class: Unreserved
- Seating arrangements: Yes
- Sleeping arrangements: No
- Catering facilities: No
- Entertainment facilities: No

Technical
- Rolling stock: 2
- Track gauge: 1,676 mm (5 ft 6 in)
- Operating speed: 37 km/h (23 mph)

The 19101/19102 Virar - Bharuch MEMU is a MEMU express train of the Indian Railways connecting Virar in Maharashtra and Bharuch Junction of Gujarat. It is currently being operated with 19101/19102 train numbers on a daily basis.

== Service ==
The 19101/Virar–Bharuch MEMU has average speed of 40 km/h and covers 267 km in 6 hrs 45 mins.

The 19102/Bharuch–Virar MEMU has average speed of 40 km/h and covers 267 km in 7 hrs 15 mins.

== Route ==
The 19101/02 Virar–Bharuch MEMU runs from Virar via Palghar, Dahanu Road, Vapi, Valsad, Navsari, Surat, Kim, Kosamba Junction, Ankleshwar Junction to Bharuch Junction and vice versa.

== Coach composite ==
The train consists of 20 MEMU Rake Coaches.
