= Mumbai Central–Ahmedabad Express =

Train in India

Borivali-Ahmedabad Express
Overview
- Service type: Express
- Locale: Maharashtra & Gujarat
- Current operator: Western Railway zone

Route
- Termini: Borivali (BVI); Ahmedabad (ADI)
- Stops: 47
- Distance travelled: 463 km (288 mi)
- Average journey time: 13hrs 25mins
- Service frequency: Daily
- Train number: 19417 / 19418

On-board services
- Classes: Sleeper class, General Unreserved
- Seating arrangements: Yes
- Sleeping arrangements: No
- Catering facilities: On-board catering E-catering
- Observation facilities: Rake sharing with 19425 / 19426 Borivali-Nandurbar Express
- Baggage facilities: Below the seats

Technical
- Rolling stock: ICF coach
- Track gauge: 1,676 mm (5 ft 6 in)
- Operating speed: 35 km/h (22 mph) average including halts

The 19417 / 19418 Borivali-Ahmedabad Express is an express train of the Indian Railways connecting Borivali in Maharashtra and Ahmedabad Junction of Gujarat. It is currently being operated with 19417/19418 train numbers on a daily basis.

== Service ==
The 19417 Borivali - Ahmedabad Express has average speed of 35 km/h and covers 463 km in 13 hrs 25 mins.

The 19418 Ahmedabad - Borivali Express has average speed of 32 km/h and covers 463 km in 14 hrs 10 mins.

== Route & halts ==
The 19417 / 19418 Borivali - Ahmedabad Express runs from Borivali via Vasai Road, Palghar, Vapi, Valsad, Surat, Bharuch Junction, Vadodara Junction, Anand Junction, Nadiad Junction to Ahmedabad Junction and vice versa.

== Coach composite ==
The train consists of 15 coaches:

- 5 Sleeper Class
- 8 Unreserved/General
- 2 Seating cum Luggage Rake

== Traction ==
It is hauled by a Valsad Loco Shed based WAP-4 electric locomotive from end to end.

== Rake sharing ==
The train shares its rake with 19425 / 19426 Borivali-Nandurbar Express.
