= Firozpur Janata Express =

Train in India

Firozpur Janta Express
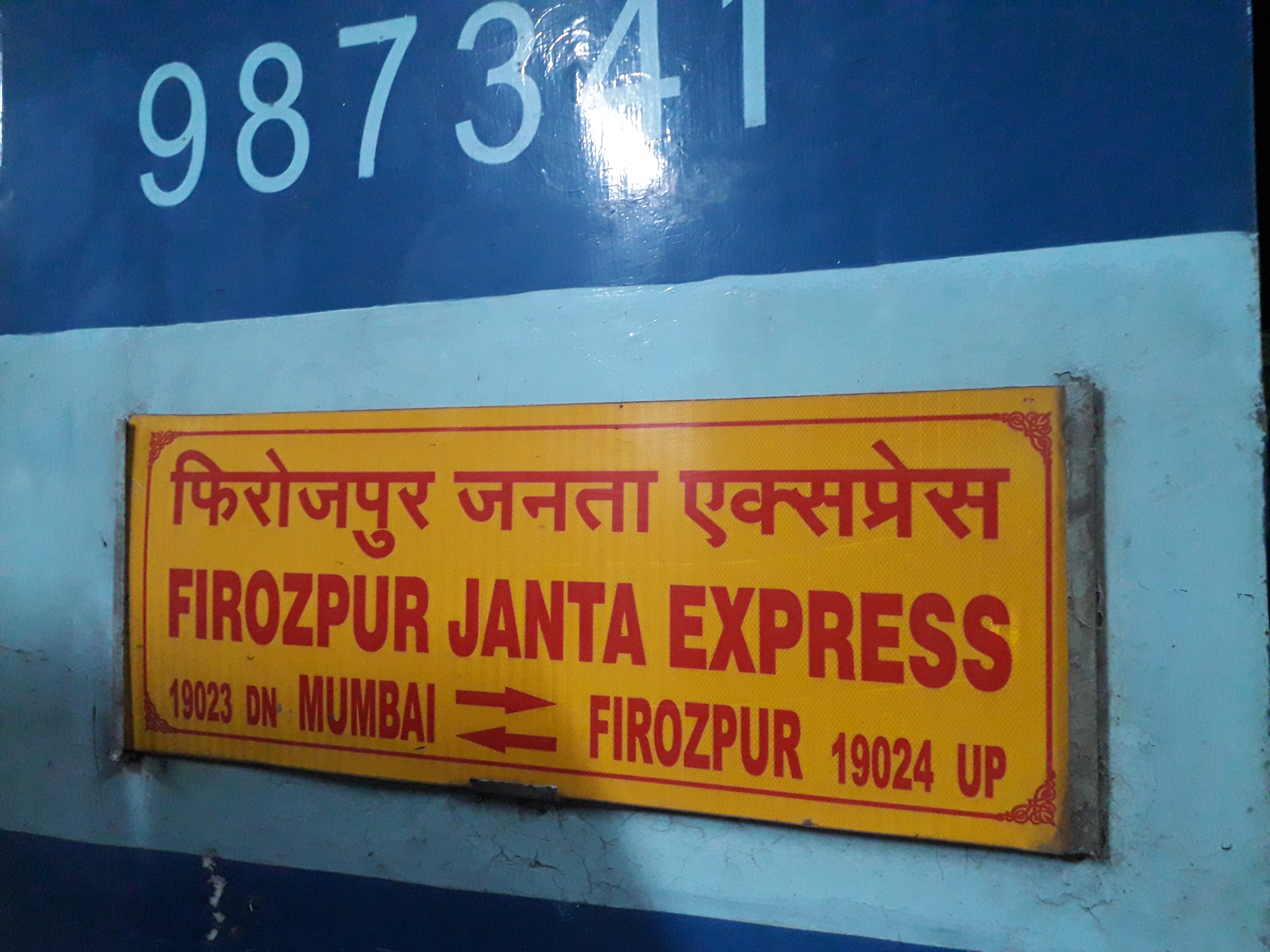
- Firozpur Janta Express trainboard

Overview
- Service type: Express
- Locale: Maharashtra, Gujarat, Madhya Pradesh, Rajasthan, Uttar Pradesh, Haryana, Delhi, Punjab
- First service: 1 October 1956; 69 years ago
- Last service: Permanently cancelled from 13 August 2020; 5 years ago
- Current operator: Western Railways

Route
- Termini: Mumbai Central (MMCT); Firozpur Cantonment (FZR)
- Stops: 92
- Distance travelled: 1,772 km (1,101 mi)
- Average journey time: 38 hours 50 minutes
- Service frequency: Daily
- Train number: 19023 / 19024

On-board services
- Classes: Sleeper class, General Unreserved
- Seating arrangements: Yes
- Sleeping arrangements: Yes
- Catering facilities: On-board catering, E-catering
- Baggage facilities: Available
- Other facilities: Below the seats

Technical
- Rolling stock: ICF coach
- Track gauge: 1,676 mm (5 ft 6 in)
- Operating speed: 110 km/h (68 mph) maximum, 45.46 km/h (28 mph) average including halts
Route map
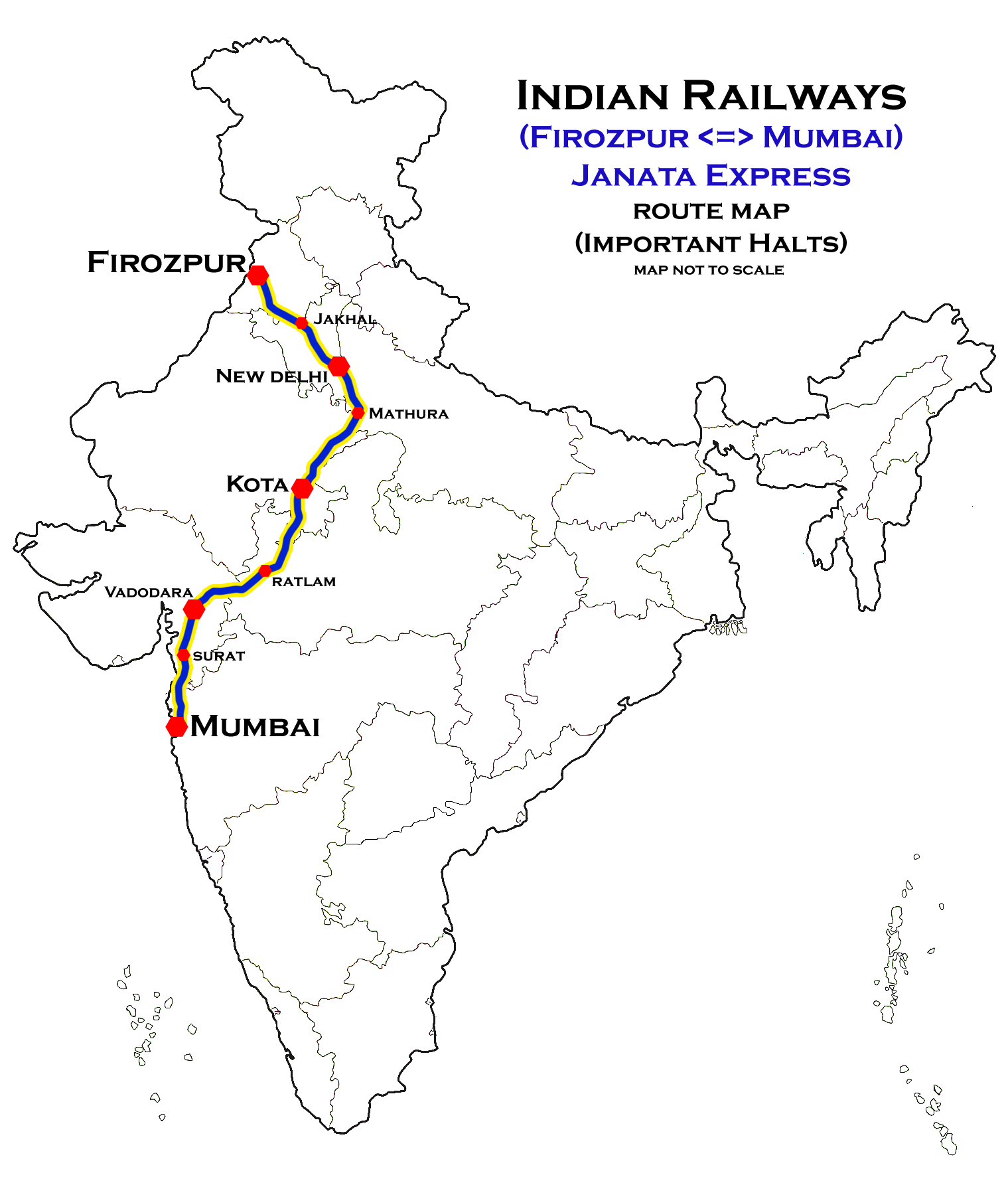

The 19023 / 19024 Firozpur Janta Express was an Express train of Indian Railways that ran between Mumbai Central and Firozpur Cantonment in India.

It operated as train number 19023 from Mumbai Central to Firozpur Cantonment and as train number 19024 in the opposite direction, serving the states of Maharashtra, Gujarat, Madhya Pradesh, Rajasthan, Uttar Pradesh, Haryana, Delhi & Punjab.

It was one of the Janta series of trains thus it had only non-air-conditioned coaches. Janata means "common people" in Devanagari.

== Coaches ==
The 19023/19024 Firozpur Janta Express had 8 Sleeper class & 6 General Unreserved coaches. It frequently carried a couple of High Capacity Parcel Van coaches.

As with most train services in India, coach composition was amended at the discretion of Indian Railways depending on demand.

== Traction ==
both trains are hauled by WAP-4 and WAP-7 throughout the journey

== Service ==
The 19023 Firozpur Janta Express covered the distance of 1772 kilometres in 38 hours 55 mins (45.53 km/h) and 39 hours as 19024 Firozpur Janta Express (45.38 km/h).

== Timetable ==
- 19023 Firozpur Janta Express left Mumbai Central every day at 07:25 hrs IST and reaches Firozpur Cantonment at 22:20 hrs IST the next day.
- 19024 Firozpur Janta Express left Firozpur Cantonment every day at 05:00 hrs IST and reaches Mumbai Central at 19:35 hrs IST the next day.

Station code	Station name	19023 – Mumbai Central to Firozpur Cantonment		Distance from source in km	Day	19024 – Firozpur Cantonment to Mumbai Central		Distance from source in km	Day
Station code	Station name	Arrival	Departure	Distance from source in km	Day	Arrival	Departure	Distance from source in km	Day
MMCT	Mumbai Central	Source	07:25	0	1	19:35	Destination	1770	2
DDR	Dadar	07:35	07:37	6	1	19:08	19:12	1764	2
BVI	Borivali	08:05	08:07	30	1	18:36	18:40	1740	2
PLG	Palghar	09:14	09:16	86	1	17:30	17:33	1688	2
ST	Surat	13:27	13:37	263	1	13:30	13:35	1507	2
BRC	Vadodara Junction	15:56	16:06	392	1	10:19	10:29	1379	2
RTM	Ratlam Junction	20:45	20:55	653	1	05:35	05:45	1117	2
KOTA	Kota Junction	01:25	01:35	920	2	23:10	23:20	851	1
GGC	Gangapur City	05:40	05:45	1092	2	19:40	19:45	679	1
MTJ	Mathura Junction	09:35	09:45	1244	2	17:00	17:05	527	1
NDLS	New Delhi	12:45	13:15	1384	2	13:05	13:35	386	1
ROK	Rohtak Junction	15:10	15:15	1457	2	11:05	11:08	315	1
BTI	Bathinda Junction	19:50	20:00	1684	2	06:55	07:05	88	1
FZR	Firozpur Cantonment	22:45	Destination	1772	2	Source	05:00	0	1
