= Mumbai Central–Nandurbar Express =

Train in India

Borivali-Nandurbar Express
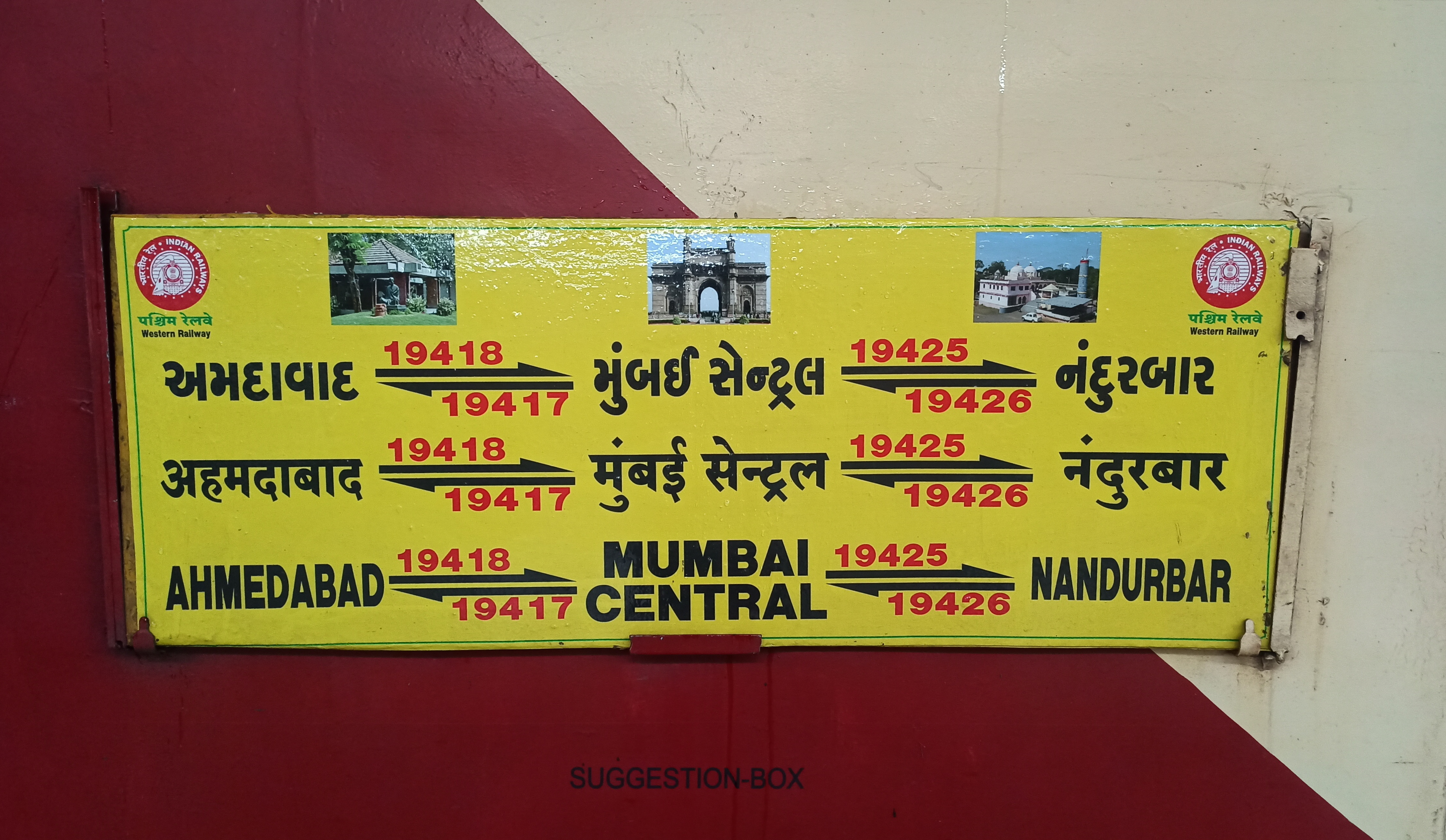

Overview
- Service type: Express
- Locale: Maharashtra & Gujarat
- Current operator: Western Railway

Route
- Termini: Borivali (BVI); Nandurbar (NDB)
- Stops: 42
- Distance travelled: 383 km (238 mi)
- Average journey time: 10hrs 43mins
- Service frequency: Daily
- Train number: 19425 / 19426

On-board services
- Classes: Sleeper class, General Unreserved
- Seating arrangements: Yes
- Sleeping arrangements: No
- Catering facilities: On-board catering E-catering
- Observation facilities: Rake sharing with 19417 / 19418 Borivali-Ahmedabad Express
- Baggage facilities: Below the seats
- Other facilities: Railway Mail Service

Technical
- Rolling stock: ICF coach
- Track gauge: 1,676 mm (5 ft 6 in)
- Operating speed: 36 km/h (22 mph) average including halts

The 19425 / 19426 Borivali-Nandurbar Express is an express train of the Indian Railways connecting Borivali in Maharashtra and Nandurbar of Maharashtra. It is currently being operated with 19425/19426 train numbers on a daily basis.

== Service ==
The 19425 Borivali - Nandurbar Express has average speed of 36 km/h and covers 383 km in 10 hrs 43 mins.

The 19426 Nandurbar - Borivali Express has average speed of 38 km/h and covers 383 km in 10 hrs 30 mins.

== Route & halts ==
The 19425 / 19426 Borivali - Nandurbar Express runs from Borivali via Palghar, Valsad, Navsari, Bhestan, Chalthan, Bardoli, Vyara, Navapur to Nandurbar and vice versa.

== Coach composite ==
The train consists of 15 coaches :

- 5 Sleeper Class
- 8 General Unreserved
- 2 Seating cum Luggage Rake

== Traction ==
Both trains are hauled by a Vadodara Loco Shed based WAP-5 or Valsad Loco Shed based WAP-4 electric locomotive from end to end.

== Rake sharing ==
The train shares its rake with 19417 / 19418 Borivali-Ahmedabad Express.
