= Vadodara Junction railway station =

Railway station in Gujarat, India

Vadodara Junction
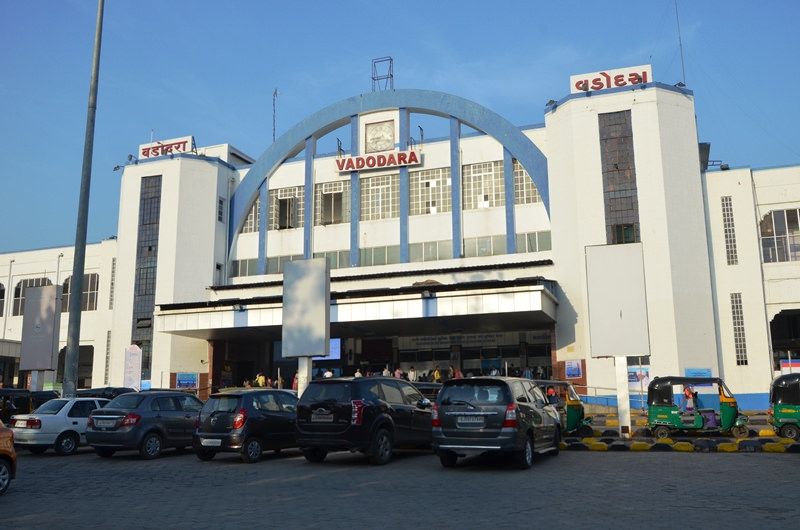
- Vadodara Junction railway station

General information
- Location: Sayajiganj, Vadodara, Gujarat; India
- Coordinates: 22°18′39″N 73°10′51″E
- Elevation: 35.348 metres (115.97 ft)
- System: Indian Railways station
- Owner: Indian Railways
- Operator: Western Railways
- Lines: New Delhi–Mumbai main line; Vadodara–Mumbai section; Ahmedabad–Howrah main line; Ahmedabad–Chennai main line; Vadodara–Chhota Udaipur line; Vadodara–Ekta Nagar line
- Platforms: 6
- Tracks: 7 Broad Gauge

Construction
- Structure type: Standard (on ground)
- Parking: Yes
- Cycle facilities: Yes
- Accessible: Available

Other information
- Status: Functional
- Station code: BRC
- Zone(s): Western Railway zone
- Division(s): Vadodara

History
- Opened: 1861; 165 years ago
- Former names: Baroda

Services
Preceding station	Indian Railways	Following station
Chhayapuri towards New Delhi	New Delhi–Mumbai main line	Vishvamitri towards Mumbai Central
Bajva towards Ahmedabad Junction	Ahmedabad–Mumbai main line	Vishvamitri towards Mumbai Central
Location
- Location within Gujarat Location within India
- Interactive map

Vadodara Junction railway station (formerly Baroda City Junction, station code: BRC) is the main station in the Indian city of Vadodara, Gujarat. Due to its strategic location, it is the fifth-busiest railway station in India in terms of frequency of trains after Kanpur Central, Vijayawada Junction, Delhi Junction, New Delhi, and Howrah, and busiest in Gujarat state as well as second important railway station in Gujarat after Ahmedabad Junction. It is also major stop on the Western Railway zone of Indian Railways. More than 340 trains start, end, or pass through the station weekly. This railway station is a junction point for rail lines from Mumbai, Delhi, Ahmedabad, Ektanagar (Kevadiya) and Chhota Udepur.

== History ==
The station was built in 1861 for the Bombay, Baroda and Central India Railway company by then Gaekwad ruler Maharaja Khanderao. The existing building was newly constructed by Indian Railways in 1954 by demolishing the original smaller station. The station celebrated 150 years of establishment on 9 January 2010.

== Amenities ==
It is a fairly large station with 6 platforms on the main line with over 300 trains halting. There are 2 foot overbridges (FOB) connecting platforms 1 and 6. Platforms 2, 3 and 6 have sliding ramps. Platform 1 and platform 6 are equipped with escalators. Additionally there are lifts at platforms 1 and 2 for aged people. There are two exits. One via platform 1 that opens towards the old city (as well as Maharaja Sayajirao University of Baroda and Central Bus Stand) while the other end is towards platform 6 (that open towards the new city- Alkapuri side). Platform 6 is the longest with 704m length. A Pay & Use Toilet facility is available at platform 6.

Platform 1 has waiting room and retiring rooms as well as a refreshment canteen. Several ATM are located just outside platform 1. Platform 7 was situated ahead of platform 1 and acted as a terminus for some passenger and MEMU trains, along with facilitating the reversal of some trains, including the Shanti Express and the Gujarat Sampark Kranti Express, which use the Vadodara–Delhi line as well as the Vadodar–Ahmedabad line. It was eventually dismantled to make way for the High Speed Railway project.

== Railway lines and college ==
The station serves three lines: the direct line between Ahmedabad and Mumbai; Vadodara and Chhota Udaipur and the Delhi line via Ratlam, Kota and Mathura. Trains going towards the northern region use the Ratlam line while all other trains use the Ahmedabad–Mumbai line, such as the Ahmedabad Shatabdi Express, Delhi Sarai Rohilla–Bandra Terminus Garib Rath Express, Gujarat Mail, Karnavati Express, Suryanagri Express and Ranakpur Express. The prestigious Mumbai Rajdhani Express, August Kranti Rajdhani Express, Ahmedabad–Mumbai Central Tejas Express, Thiruvananthapuram Rajdhani Express, Golden Temple Mail, Hazrat Nizamuddin–Pune Duronto Express and Avantika Express amongst others also halt at this station.

The Railway Staff College is the alma mater for Officers of Indian Railways. It is situated in a sprawling campus of 55 acres (22 ha) of garden and wooded land in the Pratap Vilas Palace (built in 1914) at Lalbaug, Vadodara. It provides training to all levels of Indian railway officers, from probationers to general managers.

The college was founded in 1930 at Dehradun and then shifted to its present sylvan surroundings at Vadodara in 1952. Pratap Vilas Palace is surrounded by lush green lawns and was designed by C. F. Stevens in the Renaissance style. The property was purchased from the Gaekwads, the erstwhile rulers of Vadodara, and is home to peacocks and migratory birds.

== Electric Loco Shed ==
Vadodara Electric Loco Shed is one of the largest electric loco sheds in the Western Railway zone. The shed houses more than 150 locomotives, which include WAP-4 (now transferred to other sheds), WAP-5, WAP-7, WAG-9, WAM-4 (now scrapped or withdrawn) and WAG-5 (now transferred to other sheds) locomotives. Additionally it had an AC electric trip shed to house locos coming from other sheds and an AC/DC dual loco trip shed which houses the WCAM Class locomotives from Valsad shed and which allows locomotive changes at Vadodara because the trains which were coming from New Delhi mainline are AC Locomotives and the trains going to Mumbai need AC/DC Loco. Until 2011, Mumbai was under DC supply from before Borivali when the Western Railway in Mumbai changed over to the AC system in February 2012, the WCAM locos have been transferred to the Kalyan shed.

It is currently holds 60+ WAP-5, 150+ WAP-7 and 70+ WAG-9 locomotives respectively.

It also has a MEMU car shed which houses the Mainline Electric Multiple units which provides feeder services to Ahmedabad, Surat, Dahod, Ekta Nagar (Kevadia) and Godhra.

== Major trains ==
The trains which originate from Vadodara Junction are

- Valsad–Vadodara Intercity Superfast Express (12929/12930)
- Vadodara–Ahmedabad Intercity Express (19035/19036)
- Vadodara–Kota Express (19819/19820)
- Dahanu Road–Vadodara Superfast Express (22929/22930)
- Vadodara–Jamnagar Intercity Superfast Express (22959/22960)

== Gallery ==
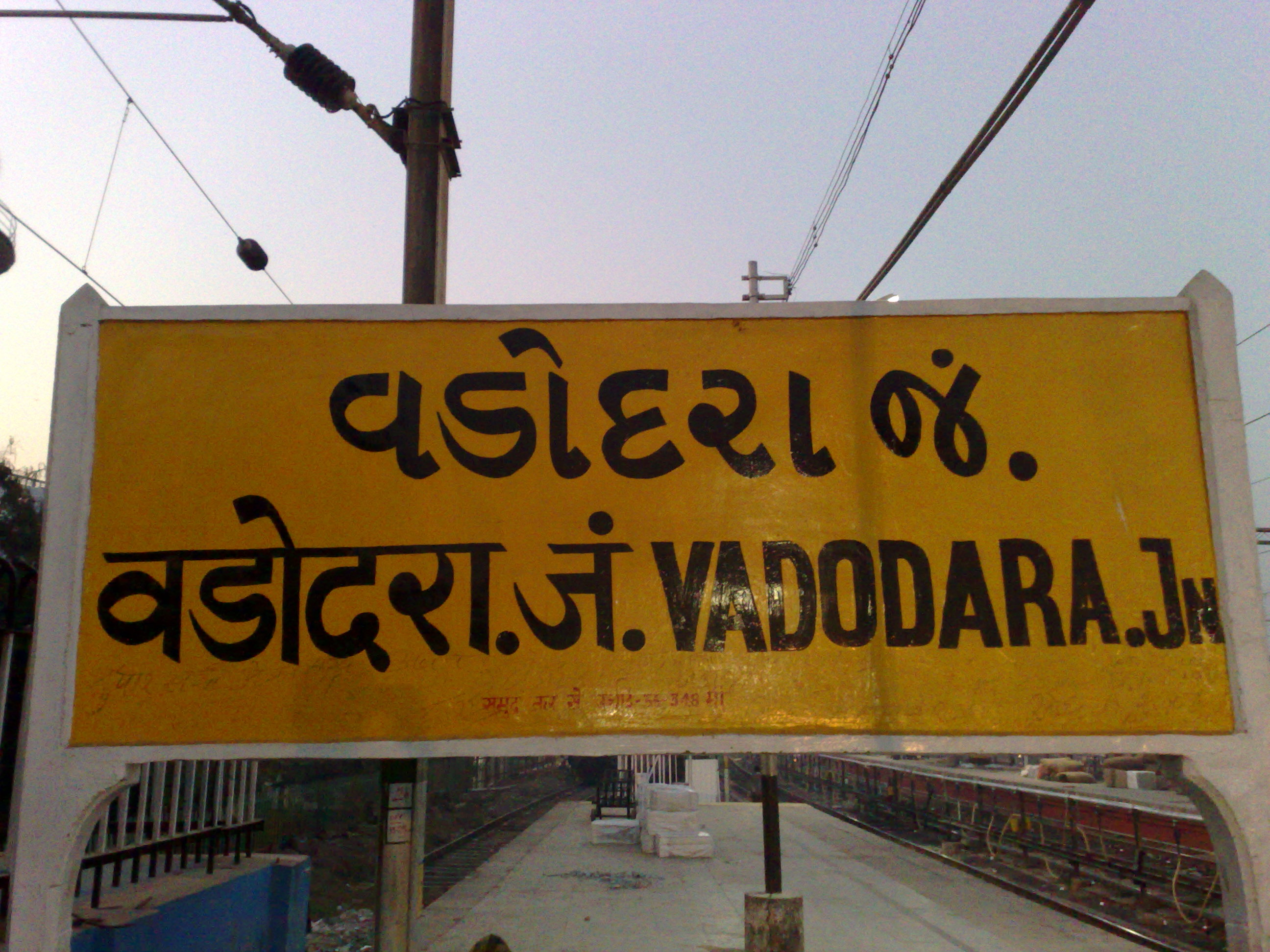
Vadodara Junction

Passengers wait next to the Rajkot Express at Vadodara station

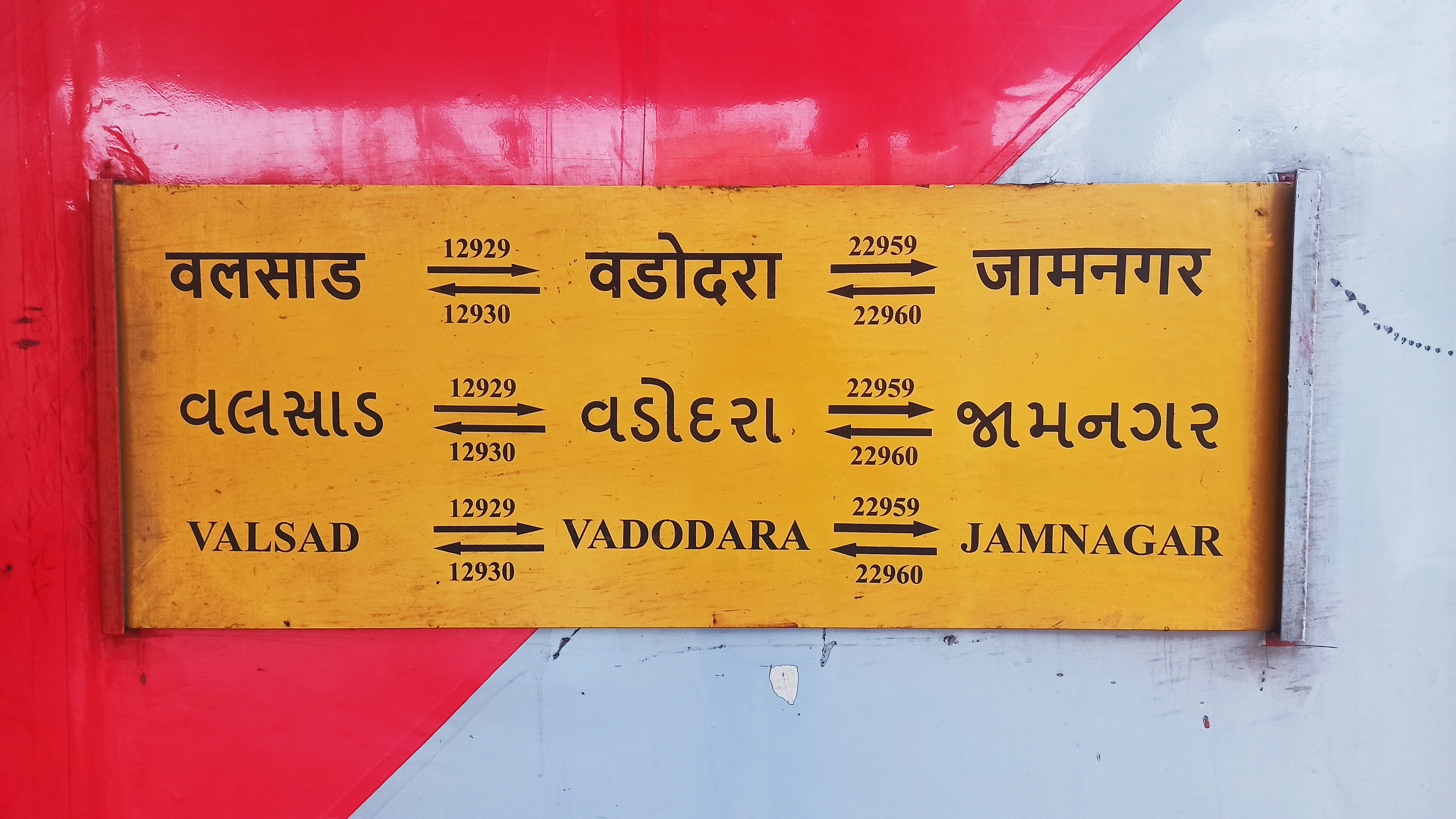

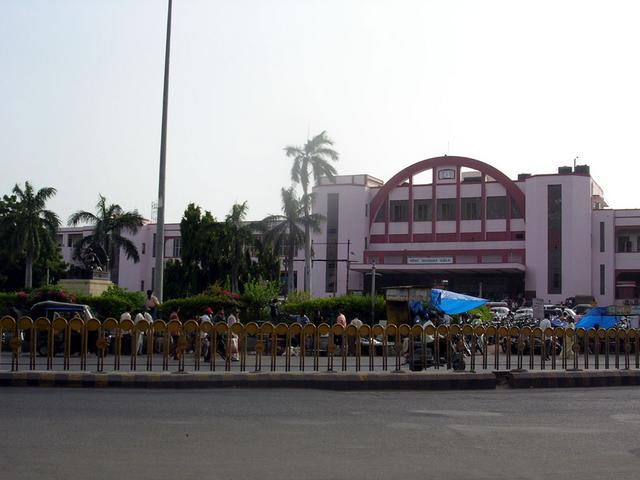
Railway station new building
