= Bharuch Junction railway station =

Railway station in Gujarat

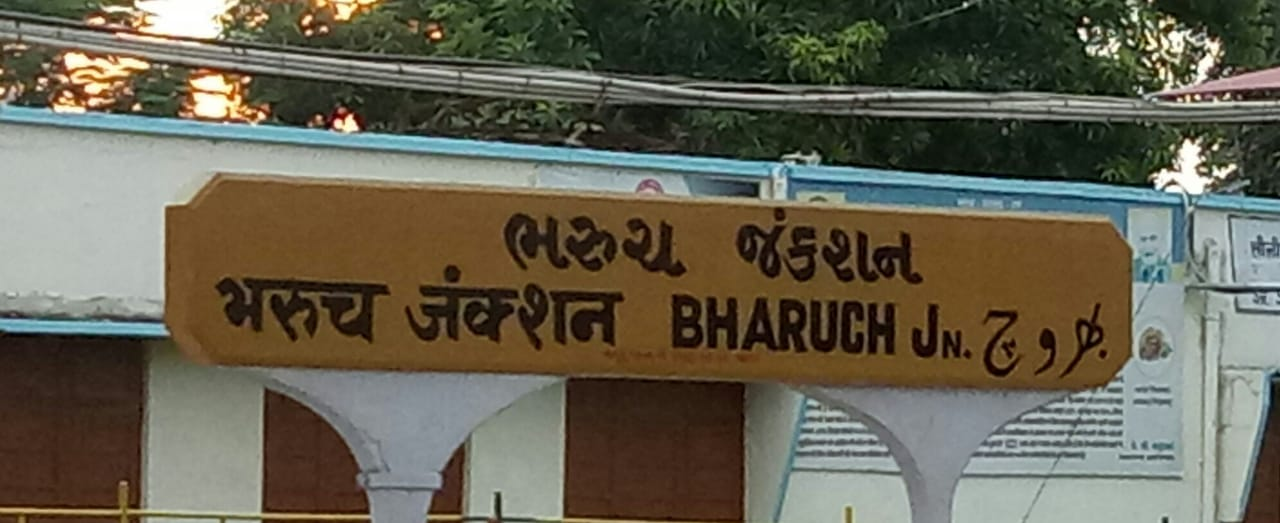

General information
- Location: Old NH 8, Bholav, Bharuch, Gujarat; India
- Coordinates: 21°42′13″N 72°59′59″E
- Elevation: 18.00 metres (59.06 ft)
- System: Indian Railway Station
- Owner: Ministry of Railways, Indian Railways
- Operator: Western Railway
- Lines: New Delhi–Mumbai main line Ahmedabad–Mumbai main line Bharuch–Dahej line
- Platforms: 5
- Tracks: 4

Construction
- Structure type: Standard (on ground station)
- Parking: Yes
- Accessible: Yes

Other information
- Status: Functioning
- Station code: BH
- Zone(s): Western Railway
- Division(s): Vadodara
- Classification: NSG3

History
- Rebuilt: Under renovation (Redevelopment)
- Former names: Broach

Passengers
- 22,516 Per Day

Services
Preceding station	Indian Railways	Following station
Chavaj towards ?	New Delhi–Mumbai main line	Ankleshwar towards ?
Location
- Location within India Location within Gujarat

Bharuch Junction (station code: BH) is a railway station on the Western Railway network, located in Bharuch, Gujarat, India. It is 'A' category railway station of Western Railway zone of Indian Railways. It serves Bharuch city. It has 5 platforms.It has a double discharge platform type, Platform 1 (the shorter one is the side platform) and Platform 2 (island platform). Bharuch Junction is well connected to Dahej Port by rail.There was a passenger train operated on the Dahej route (which is now discontinued and no longer operational due to lack of passengers)

It is an important halt for all trains that are bound for Ahmedabad Junction, Jaipur Junction, Mumbai, Amritsar and Delhi.

== Lines ==
The main lines passing through Bharuch Junction are :

- New Delhi–Mumbai main line via Kota Junction
- Ahmedabad–Mumbai main line via Vadodara Junction
- Fharhan

== Gallery ==
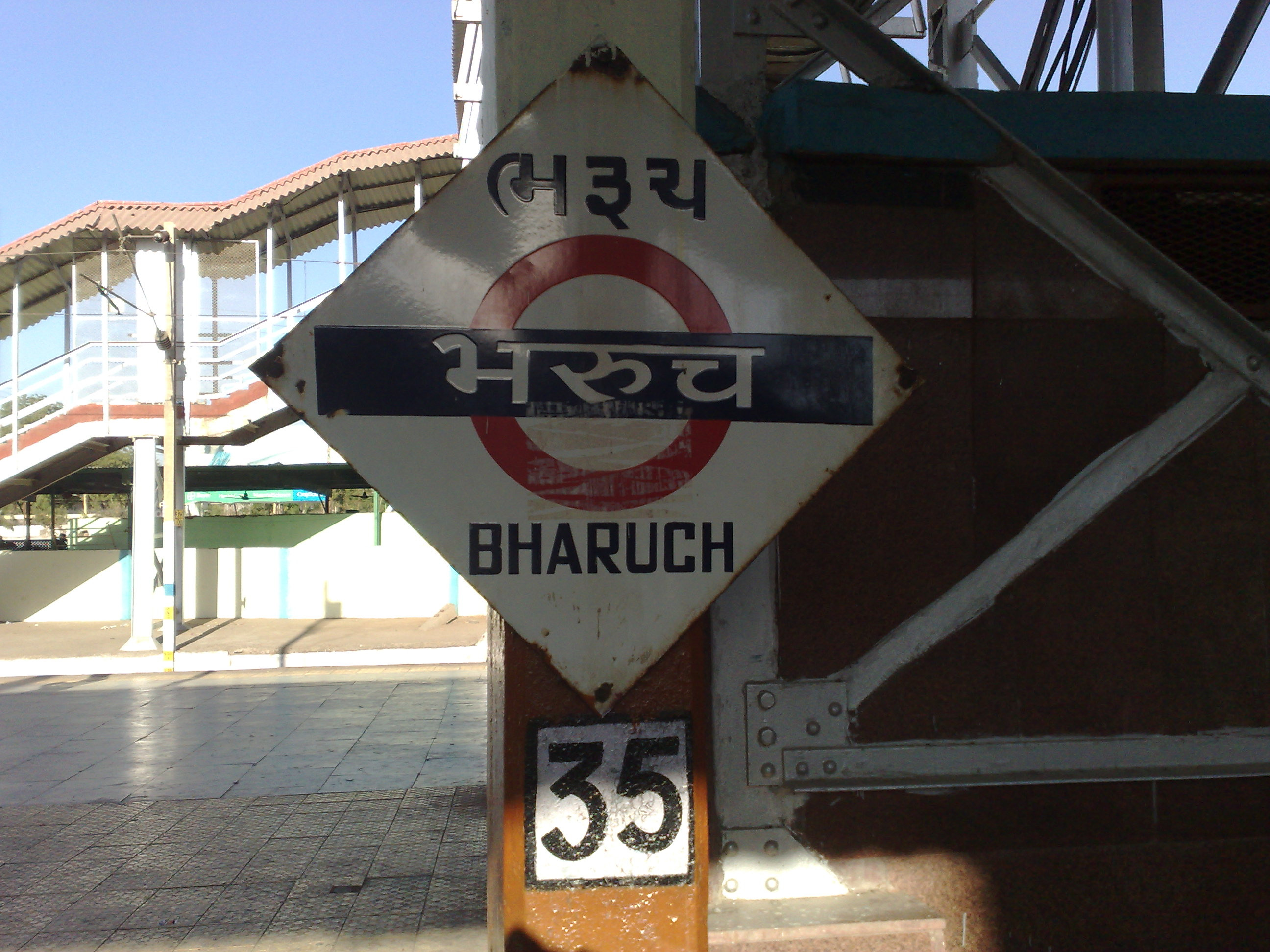
Bharuch Platform Board

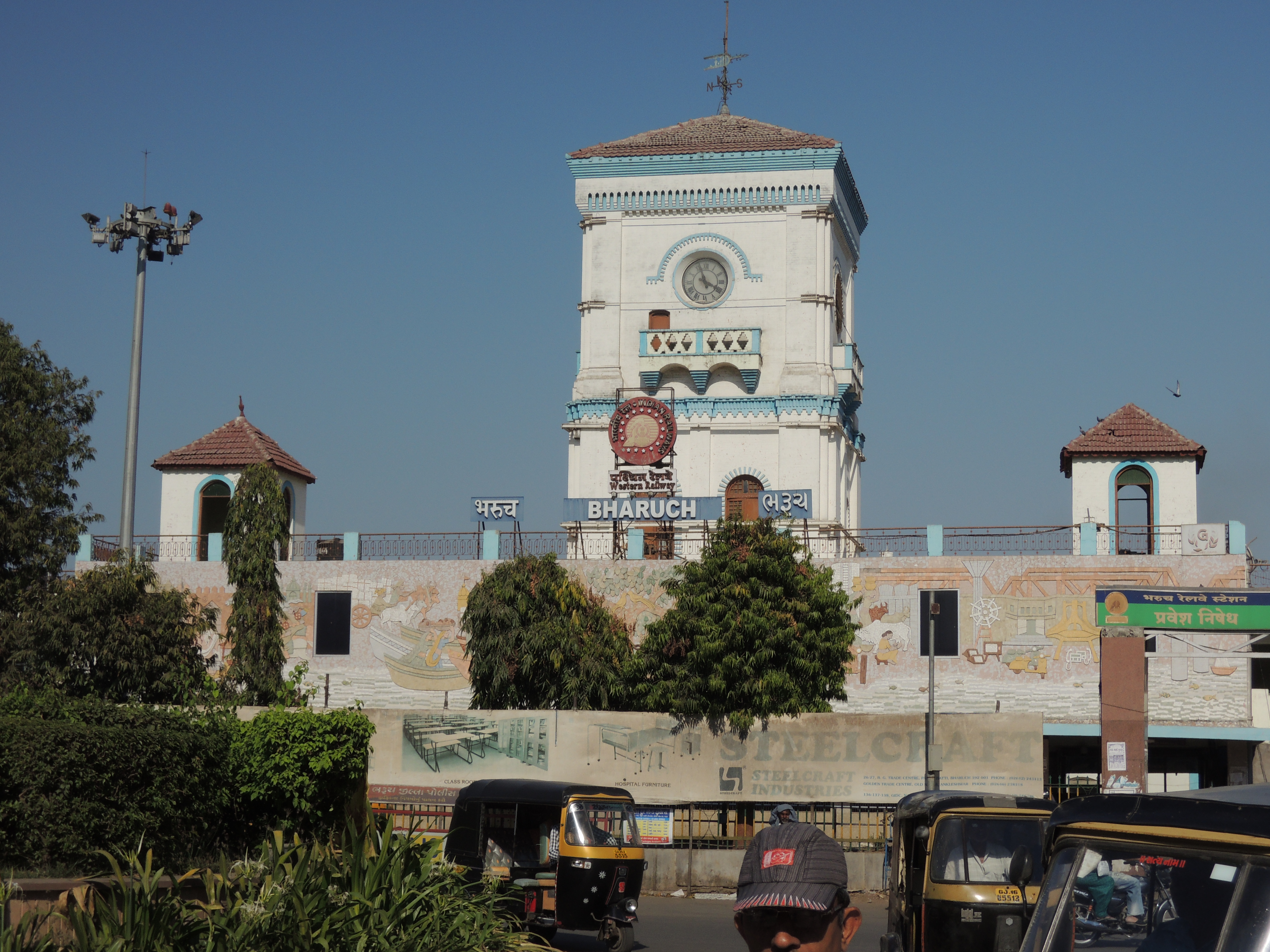
Bharuch Railway Station was constructed in Dutch Style

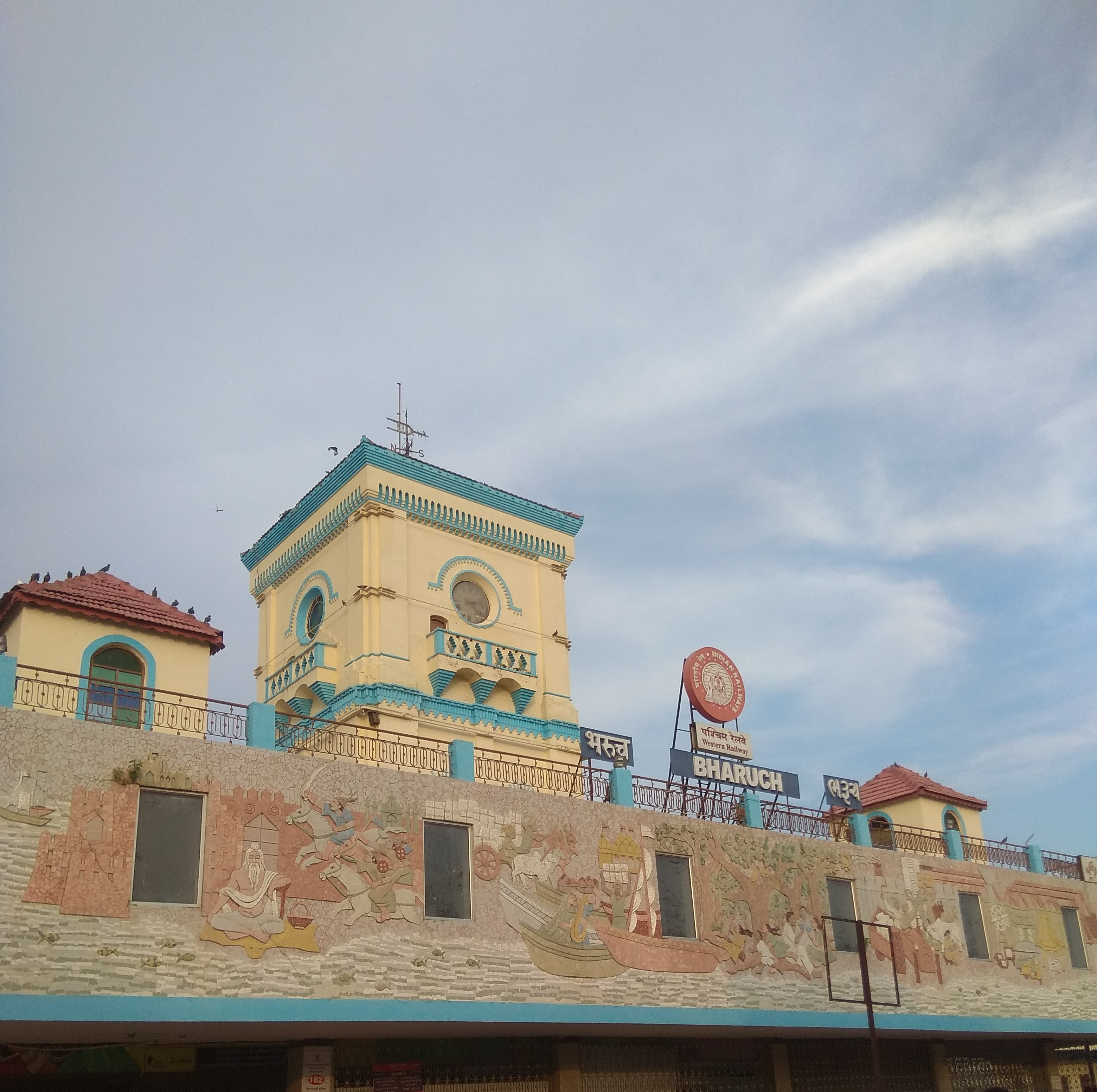
Bharuch Railway Station Building

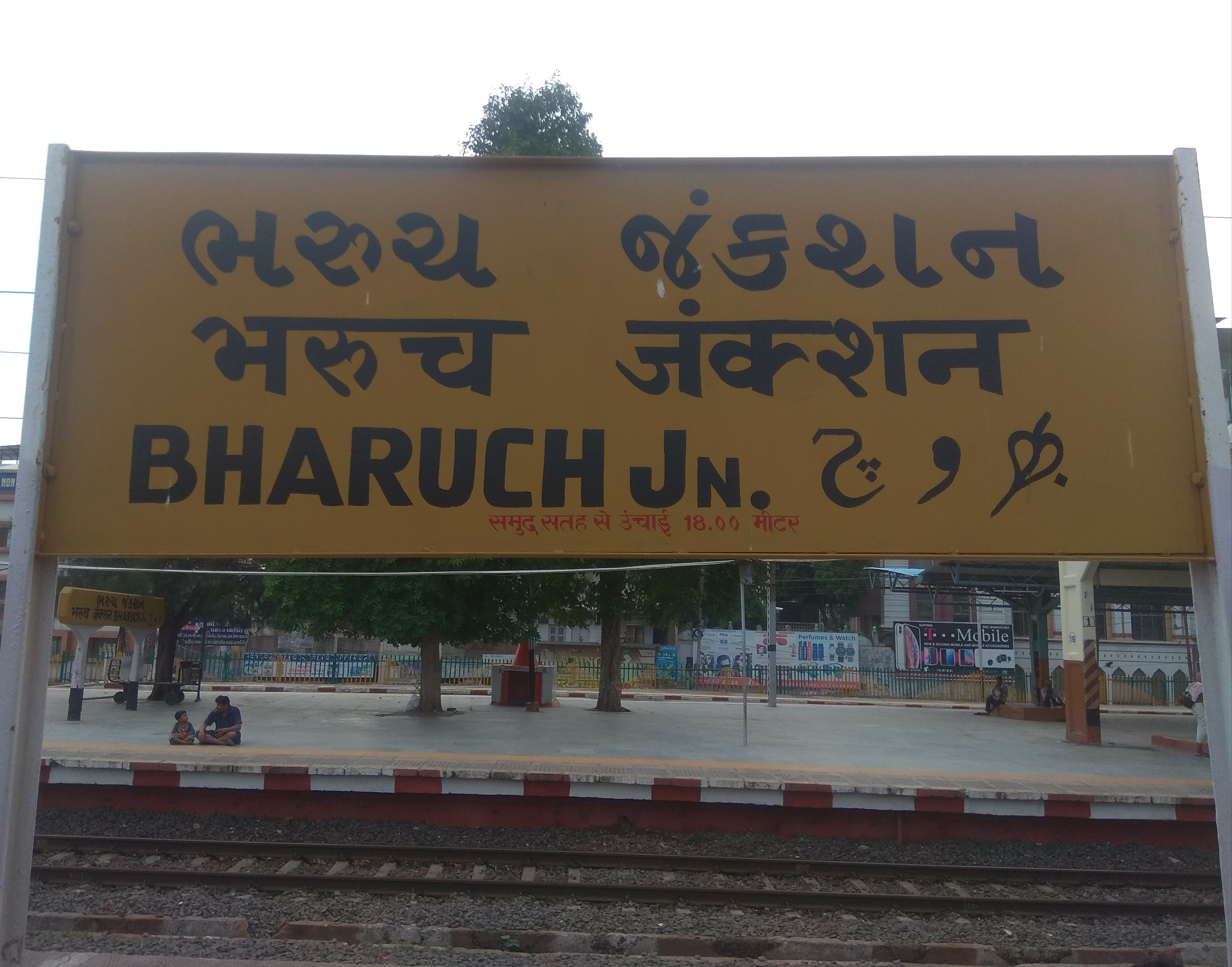
Bharuch Railway Station: Platform Board

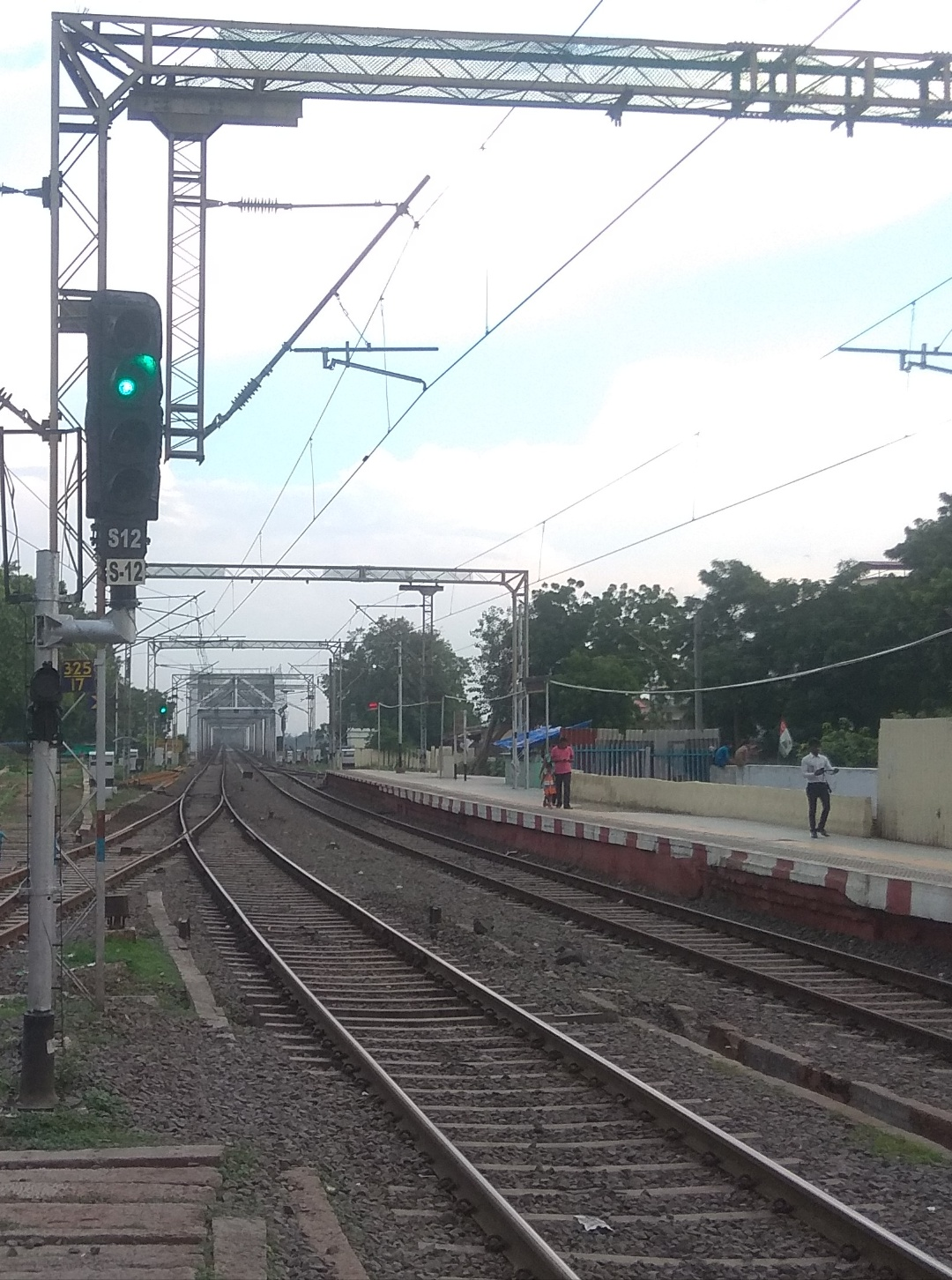
Narmada Bridge Near Bharuch Railway Station

== Trains ==
Some of the following trains that start from Bharuch Junction are:

- 69175/76 Bharuch–Anand MEMU
- 69195/96 Bharuch–Dahej MEMU
- 69171/72 Bharuch–Surat MEMU
- 69149/50 Virar–Bharuch MEMU
