= Ankleshwar Junction railway station =

Railway station in Gujarat

Ankleshwar Junction
- Indian Railways logo

General information
- Location: Ankleshwar, Gujarat; India
- Coordinates: 21°37′30″N 73°00′05″E
- Elevation: 20 metres (66 ft)
- System: Indian Railways station
- Owner: Indian Railways
- Operator: Western Railway
- Lines: New Delhi–Mumbai main line Ahmedabad–Mumbai main line Ankleshwar–Rajpipla section
- Platforms: 4
- Tracks: 8
- Connections: Auto stand

Construction
- Structure type: Standard (on-ground station)
- Parking: No
- Cycle facilities: No

Other information
- Status: Functioning
- Station code: AKV
- Zone(s): Western Railway
- Division(s): Vadodara
Location
- Location within India Location within Gujarat

Ankleshwar Junction railway station is a railway station serving Ankleshwar town, in Bharuch district of Gujarat State of India. It is under Vadodara railway division of Western Railway zone of Indian Railways. It is located on New Delhi–Mumbai main line of the Indian Railways.

It is located at 20 m above sea level and has four platforms. As of 2016, electrified double broad-gauge railway line exist and at this station, 87 trains stops and one train each originates and terminates. Surat Airport, is at distance of 65 kilo meters.

== History ==
On 10 February 1860, BB&CI started its first section from Ankleshwar Junction to Utran. The BB&CI Railway was incorporated in 1855, starting with the construction of a 46.67 km (29 mi) broad-gauge track from Ankleshwar Junction to Utran in Gujarat on the West Coast.

== See also ==
Rajpipla State Railway
