= New Delhi–Mumbai main line =

Major railway line in India

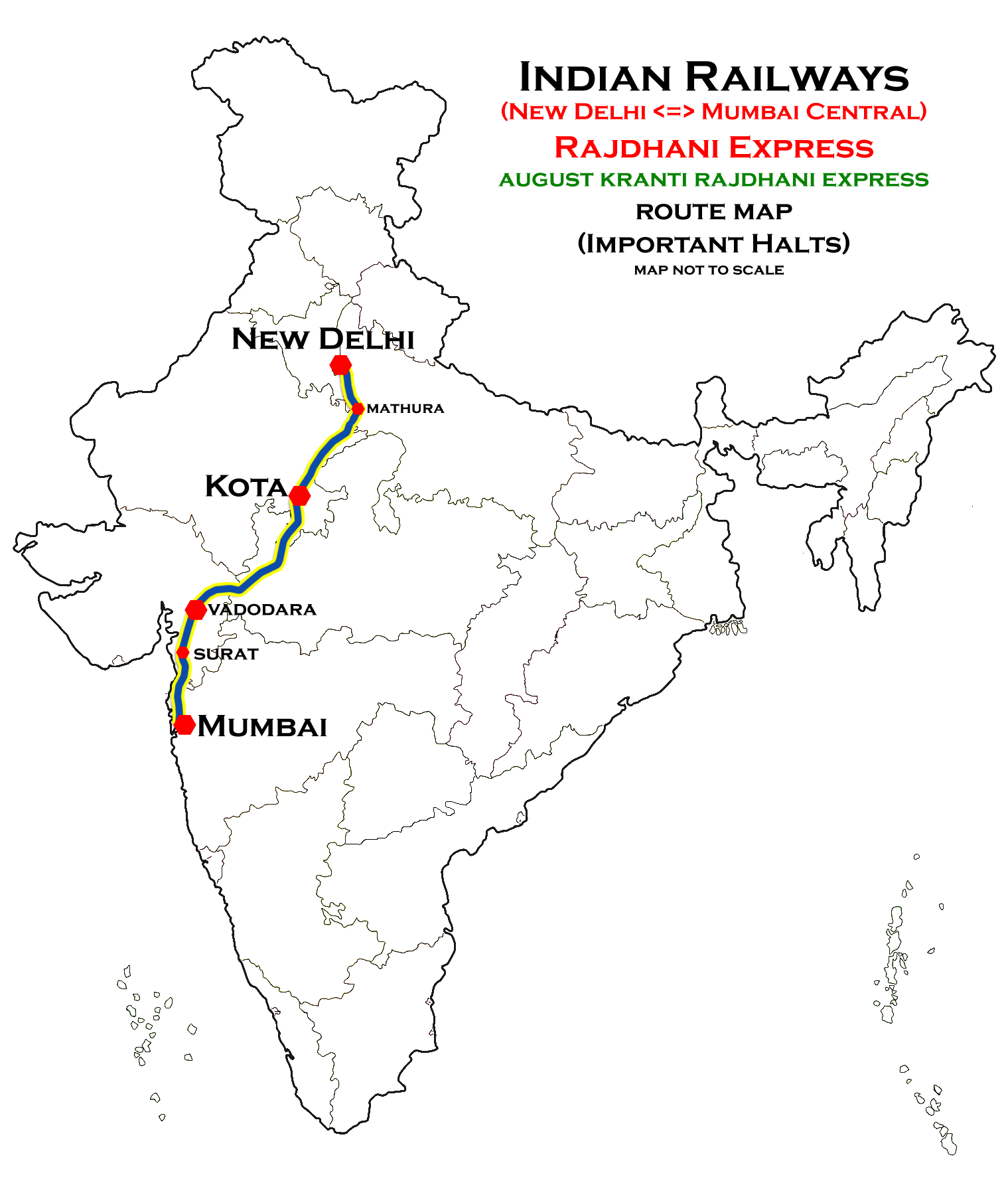

Overview
- Status: Operational
- Owner: Indian Railways
- Locale: Delhi, Haryana, Uttar Pradesh, Rajasthan, Madhya Pradesh, Gujarat, Maharashtra
- Termini: New Delhi, Hazrat Nizamuddin; Mumbai Central, Bandra Terminus, Dadar railway station

Service
- Operator(s): Northern Railway, North Central Railway, West Central Railway, Western Railway

Technical
- Line length: 1,386 km (861 mi)
- Num of tracks: 2/4
- Track gauge: 5 ft 6 in (1,676 mm) broad gauge
- Electrification: 25 kV AC 50 Hz OHE
- Operating speed: up to 130 km/h

The New Delhi–Mumbai line is a major railway line in India. Linking the national capital of New Delhi with financial capital Mumbai, this railway line covers a distance of 1,386 kilometres (861 mi) across the Indian states of Delhi, Haryana, Uttar Pradesh, Madhya Pradesh, Rajasthan, Gujarat and Maharashtra. Mumbai Tejas-Rajdhani Express which is the fastest Tejas-Rajdhani Express and the fastest train on this route, travels on this line and covers the distance between Delhi and Mumbai in 15 hours and 32 minutes at a top speed of 130 km/h which will be increased to 160km/h soon and a top average speed of 89 km/h.

== Details ==
Starting at the New Delhi, the Delhi–Mumbai line runs concurrent with Delhi–Chennai line for 141 km up to Mathura. From here it runs in Southwest direction and passes through cities of Bharatpur, Kota, Ratlam, Vadodara, Surat before terminating at Mumbai Central. Within Maharashtra, Western line of Mumbai Suburban Railway uses runs on the same tracks from Dahanu Road to Mumbai Central.

== Electrification ==
The Delhi–Mumbai line was fully electrified by 1987. Virar Ahmedabad sector was AC electrified since 1973-74 in phases.

== Passenger movement ==
New Delhi, Mathura, Kota, Ratlam, Vadodara, Surat and Mumbai Central, on this line, are amongst the top hundred booking stations of Indian Railway.

== Line upgradation ==
The line is set to be upgraded for the trains to travel at a speed of 130 kmph. This will reduce the travel time between the two cities. In the future the new generation trains such as Vande Bharat and its sleeper version, would also be able to run at a speed of 160 kmph.

== Golden quadrilateral ==
The New Delhi-Mumbai line is a part of the golden quadrilateral. The routes connecting the four major metropolises (New Delhi, Mumbai, Chennai and Kolkata), along with their diagonals, known as the golden quadrilateral, carry about half the freight and nearly half the passenger traffic, although they form only 16 per cent of the length.[15]

== Major trains ==
- Mumbai Rajdhani Express
- August Kranti Rajdhani Express
- Thiruvananthapuram Rajdhani Express
- Madgaon Rajdhani Express
- Mumbai–New Delhi Duronto Express
- Hazrat Nizamuddin–Pune Duronto Express
- Bandra Terminus–Hazrat Nizamuddin Yuva Express
- Bandra Terminus–Hazrat Nizamuddin Garib Rath Express
- Amritsar Mumbai Central Golden Temple Mail
- Paschim Express
- Maharashtra Sampark Kranti Express
- Goa Sampark Kranti Express
- Kerala Sampark Kranti Express
- Ernakulam–H.Nizamuddin Duronto Express
