= Ahmedabad–Mumbai Central Vande Bharat Express =

Vande Bharat Express train route in India

Ahmedabad Junction - Mumbai Central Vande Bharat Express
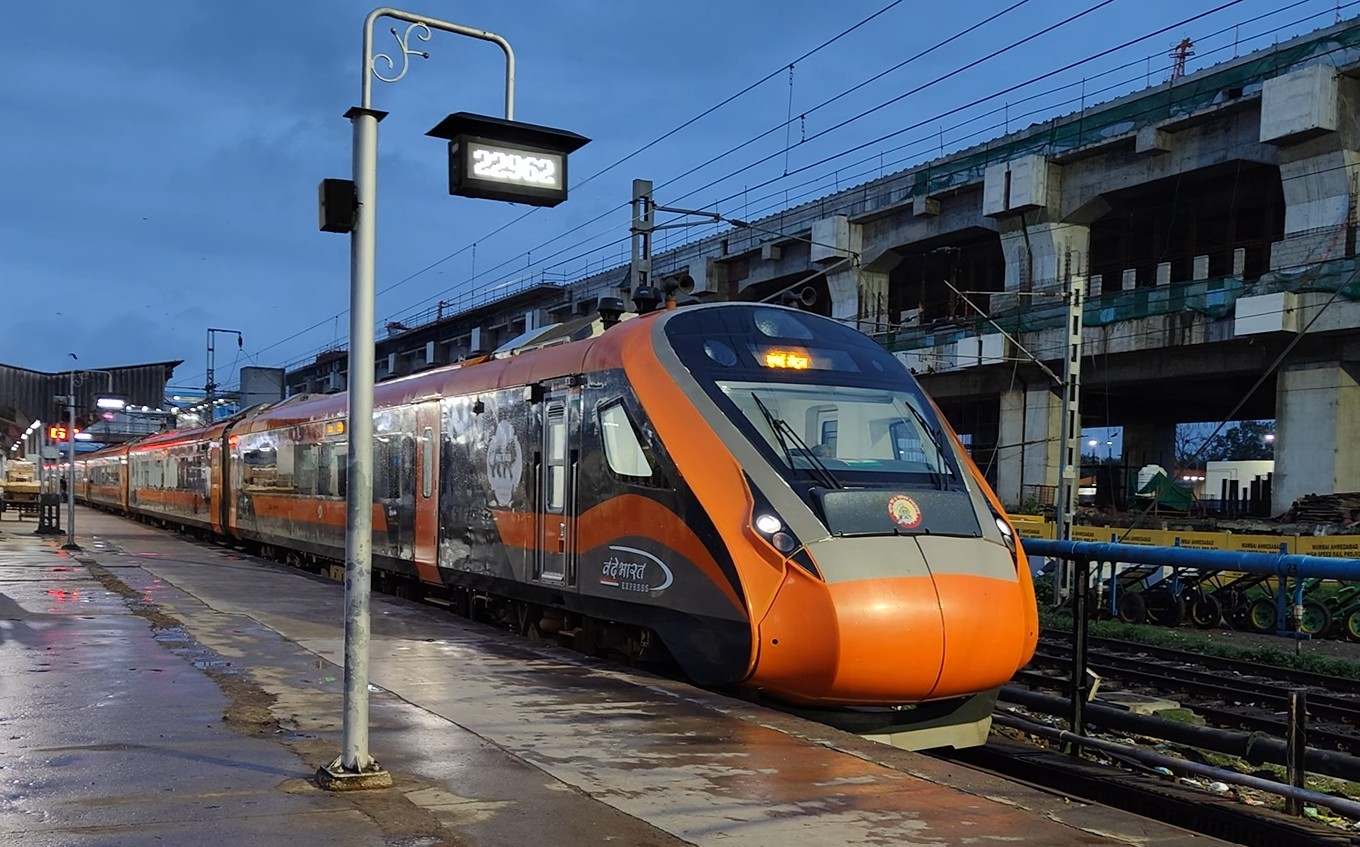
- This Saffron-Gray VB Express on stand-by and getting ready for departure towards Mumbai Central

Overview
- Service type: Vande Bharat Express
- Locale: Gujarat and Maharashtra
- First service: March 12, 2024 (Inaugural); 13 March 2024; 2 years ago (Commercial)
- Current operator: Western Railways (WR)

Route
- Termini: Ahmedabad Junction (ADI); Mumbai Central (MMCT)
- Stops: 4
- Distance travelled: 493 km (306 mi)
- Average journey time: 05 hrs 25 mins
- Service frequency: Six days a week (Note: Except Sundays)
- Train number: 22962 / 22961
- Line used: Ahmedabad–Mumbai main line

On-board services
- Classes: AC Chair Car, AC Executive Chair Car
- Seating arrangements: Airline style; Rotatable seats
- Sleeping arrangements: No
- Catering facilities: On board Catering
- Observation facilities: Large windows in all coaches
- Entertainment facilities: On-board WiFi; Infotainment System; Electric outlets; Reading light; Seat Pockets; Bottle Holder; Tray Table
- Baggage facilities: Overhead racks
- Other facilities: Kavach

Technical
- Rolling stock: Vande Bharat 2.0
- Track gauge: Indian gauge 1,676 mm (5 ft 6 in) broad gauge
- Electrification: 25 kV 50 Hz AC Overhead line
- Operating speed: 91 km/h (57 mph) (Avg.)
- Average length: 384 metres (1,260 ft) (16 coaches)
- Track owner: Indian Railways
- Rake maintenance: (TBC)

The 22962/22961 Ahmedabad - Mumbai Central Vande Bharat Express is India's 45th Vande Bharat Express train, connecting the largest city of Gujarat, Ahmedabad with the west coastal capital city Mumbai in Maharashtra. This express train was inaugurated by Prime Minister Narendra Modi via video conferencing from Ahmedabad on March 12, 2024. It is the third fastest train of India.

== Overview ==
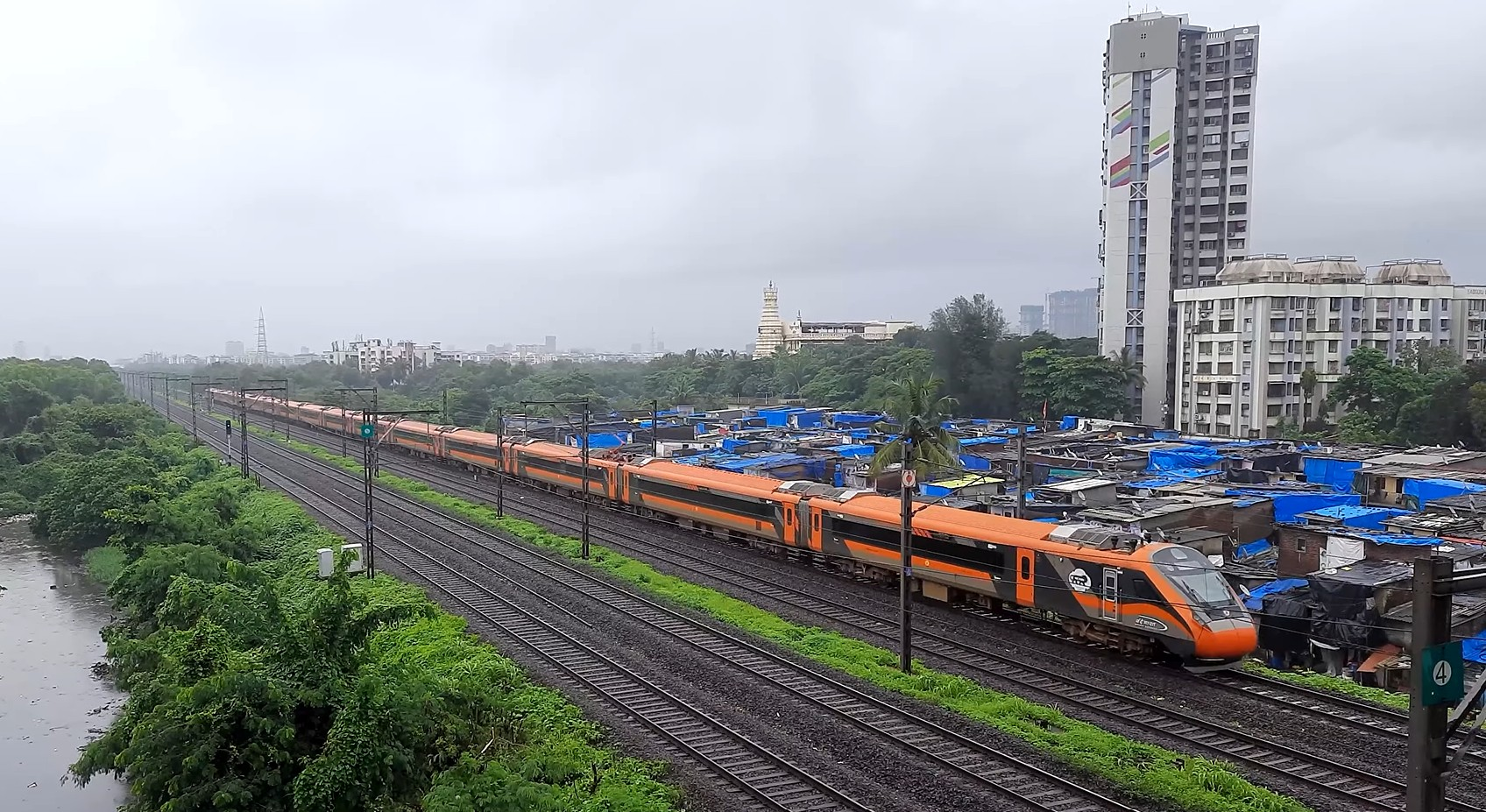
Mumbai Central Vande Bharat Express nearing Borivali

This train is operated by Indian Railways, connecting Ahmedabad Jn, Vadodara Jn, Surat, Vapi, Borivali and Mumbai Central. It is operated with train numbers 22962/22961 on 6 days a week basis.

== Rakes ==
It is the forty-third 2nd Generation Vande Bharat Express train which was designed and manufactured by the Integral Coach Factory at Perambur, Chennai under the Make in India Initiative.

Now it is running with 20 coaches.

== Service ==
The 22962/22961 Ahmedabad Jn - Mumbai Ctrl Vande Bharat Express operates six days a week except Sundays, covering a distance of 493 km (306 mi) in a travel time of 5 hours with an average speed of 91 km/h (57 mph). The service has 4 intermediate stops. The Maximum Permissible Speed is 130 km/h (81 mph).

== See also ==
- Mumbai Central–Gandhinagar Capital Vande Bharat Express
- Vande Bharat Express
- Tejas Express
- Gatimaan Express
- Ahmedabad Junction railway station
- Mumbai Central railway station
