= Mumbai Central–New Delhi Tejas Rajdhani Express =

Train in India

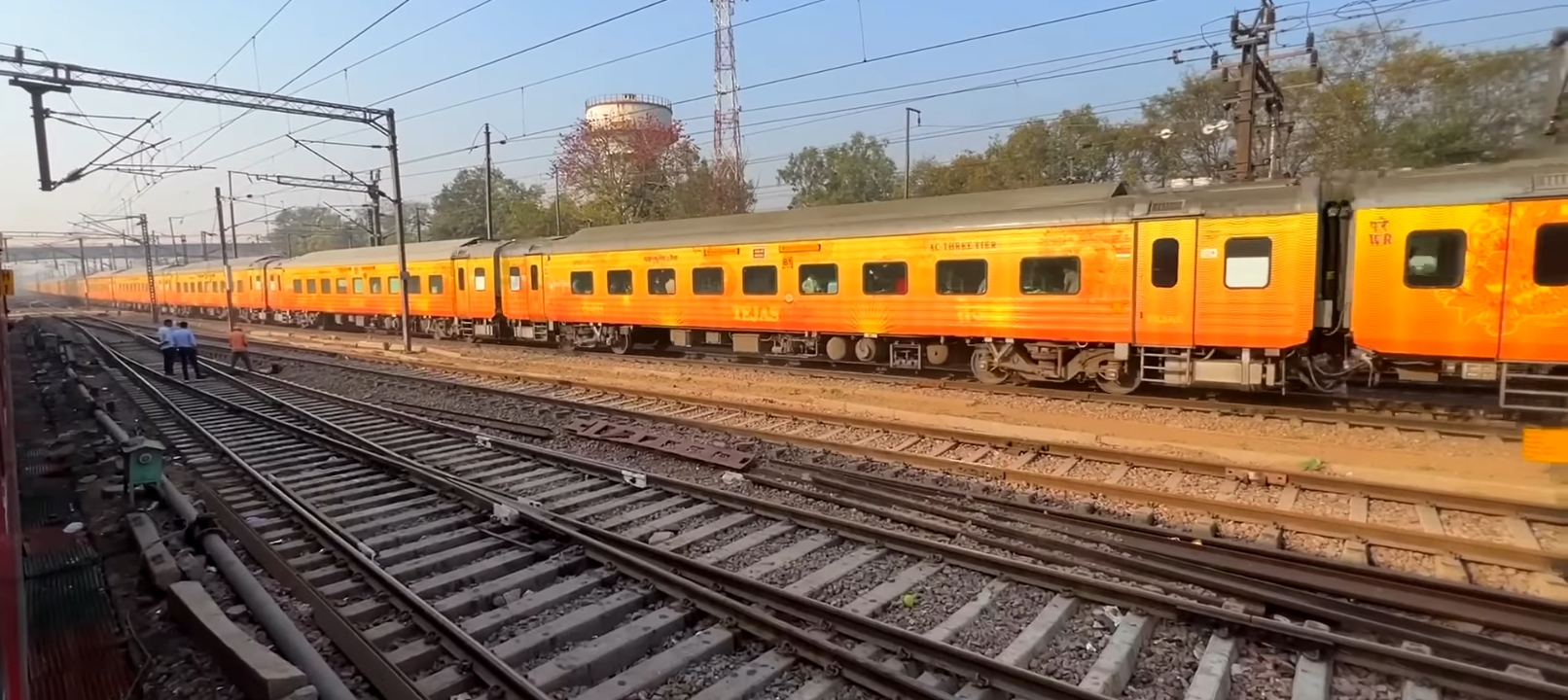
- Mumbai Central– New Delhi Tejas Rajdhani Express skipping Hazrat Nizamuddin railway station

Overview
- Service type: Tejas Rajdhani Express
- Status: Operating
- Locale: Maharashtra, Gujarat, Madhya Pradesh, Rajasthan, Uttar Pradesh & Delhi
- First service: 17 May 1972; 54 years ago
- Current operator: Western Railway

Route
- Termini: Mumbai Central (MMCT); New Delhi (NDLS)
- Stops: 6
- Distance travelled: 1,386 km (861 mi)
- Average journey time: 15 hours and 32 minutes
- Service frequency: Daily
- Train number: 12951 / 12952
- Lines used: Mumbai–Vadodara section; Vadodara–Mathura section; Mathura–New Delhi section

On-board services
- Classes: AC First Class, AC 2 Tier, AC 3 Tier
- Seating arrangements: No
- Sleeping arrangements: Yes
- Catering facilities: Available
- Observation facilities: Large windows
- Entertainment facilities: No
- Baggage facilities: Available

Technical
- Rolling stock: LHB Tejas
- Track gauge: 1,676 mm (5 ft 6 in)
- Operating speed: 130 km/h (81 mph) maximum speed, 88 km/h (55 mph) average including halts
- Rake maintenance: Mumbai Central
- Rake sharing: 12953 / 12954 August Kranti Tejas Rajdhani Express
Route map
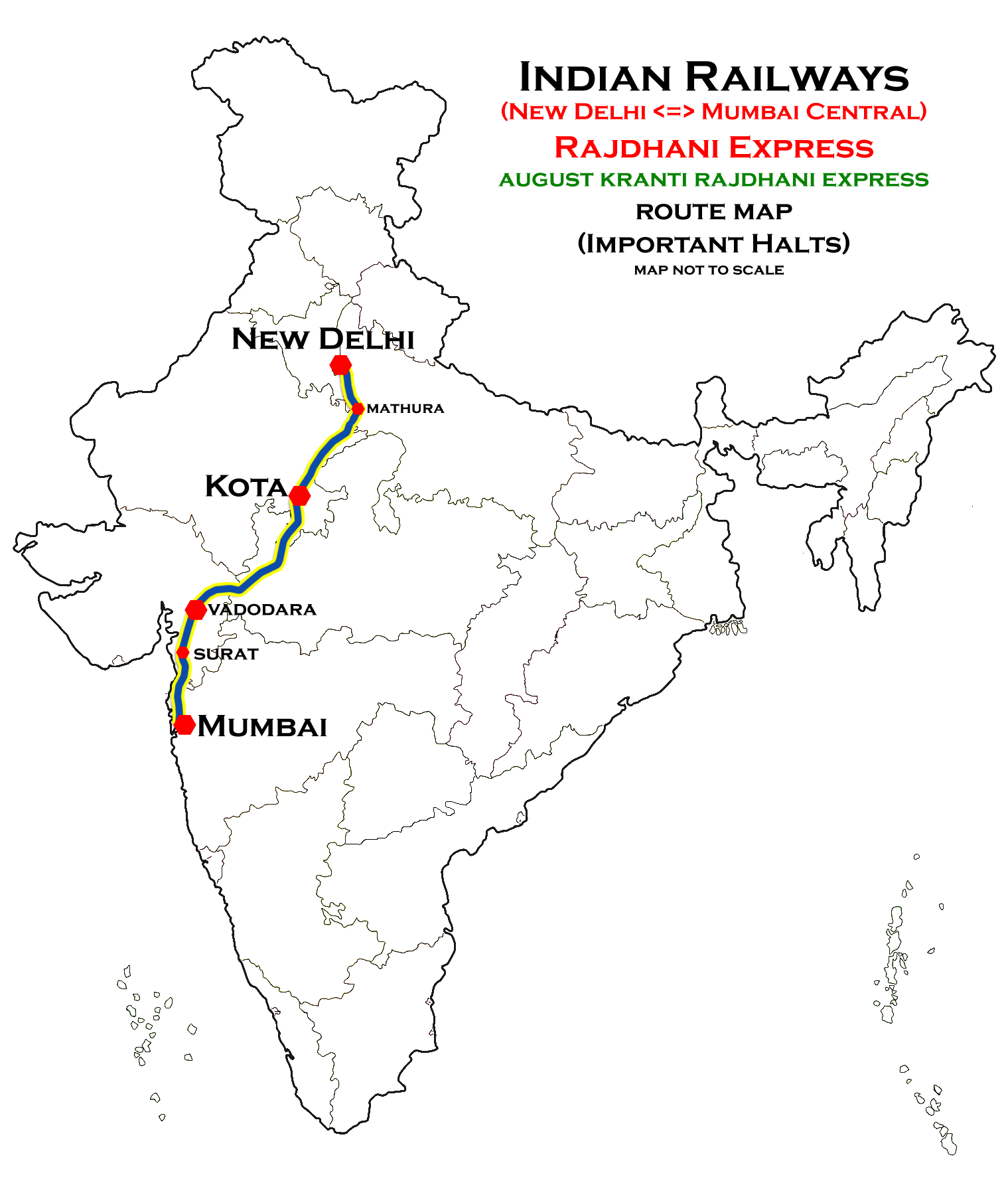
↓ 12952 • 12951 ↑

The 12951 / 12952 Mumbai Central – New Delhi - Mumbai Central Tejas Rajdhani Express is a High Speed Tejas Rajdhani class train of Indian Railways, that connects Mumbai Central (MMCT) and New Delhi (NDLS) in India. It is the fastest across all Rajdhani Express service of India, with an average speed of 88 km/h and maximum permissible speed of 130 km/h. It is widely regarded as the most premium train on the Indian Railway network and is given the highest priority in terms of clearance. It was the second Rajdhani Express train in India to be introduced after the Howrah Rajdhani Express. It covers almost 1,400 km in 15 hours and 32 minutes. It is one of the fastest active-rail trains in India.

== History ==
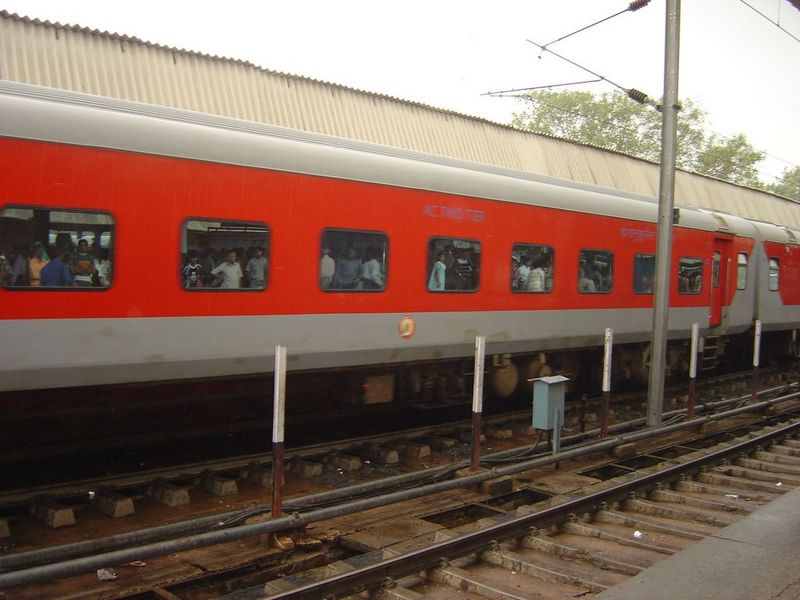
Previously, Mumbai Rajdhani Express had LHB rakes.

The initial mention of the Rajdhani service originating from Bombay was documented in the Annual Railway Budget for the fiscal year 1970-71, coinciding with the introduction of a meter gauge Rajdhani from Ahmedabad to Delhi. Subsequently, on 17 May 1972, the second Rajdhani Express in India was inaugurated from Bombay Central under the auspices of the then Minister of Railways, Shri. K. Hanumanthaiya. This inaugural service, identified as 151 DN / 152 UP Bombay Central – New Delhi Rajdhani Express, comprised four air-conditioned chair car coaches (ACC), two air-conditioned sleeper car coaches (AC Sleeper), one air-conditioned first-class coach (AC First Class), one pantry car (PC), and two power cars. The inaugural Bombay Rajdhani Express was hauled by a single WDM-2 locomotive from the Ratlam shed. This locomotive was specially retrofitted for Rajdhani Express operations, featuring re-gearing and resilient thrust pad enhancements to facilitate speeds of up to 120 km/h. Departing from platform number 5 of Bombay Central at 15:45 hrs, the Rajdhani Express traversed the Baroda (now Vadodara) – Kota – Mathura route, arriving in New Delhi the following morning at 11:50 hrs, thereby achieving a record journey time of 19 hours 05 minutes.

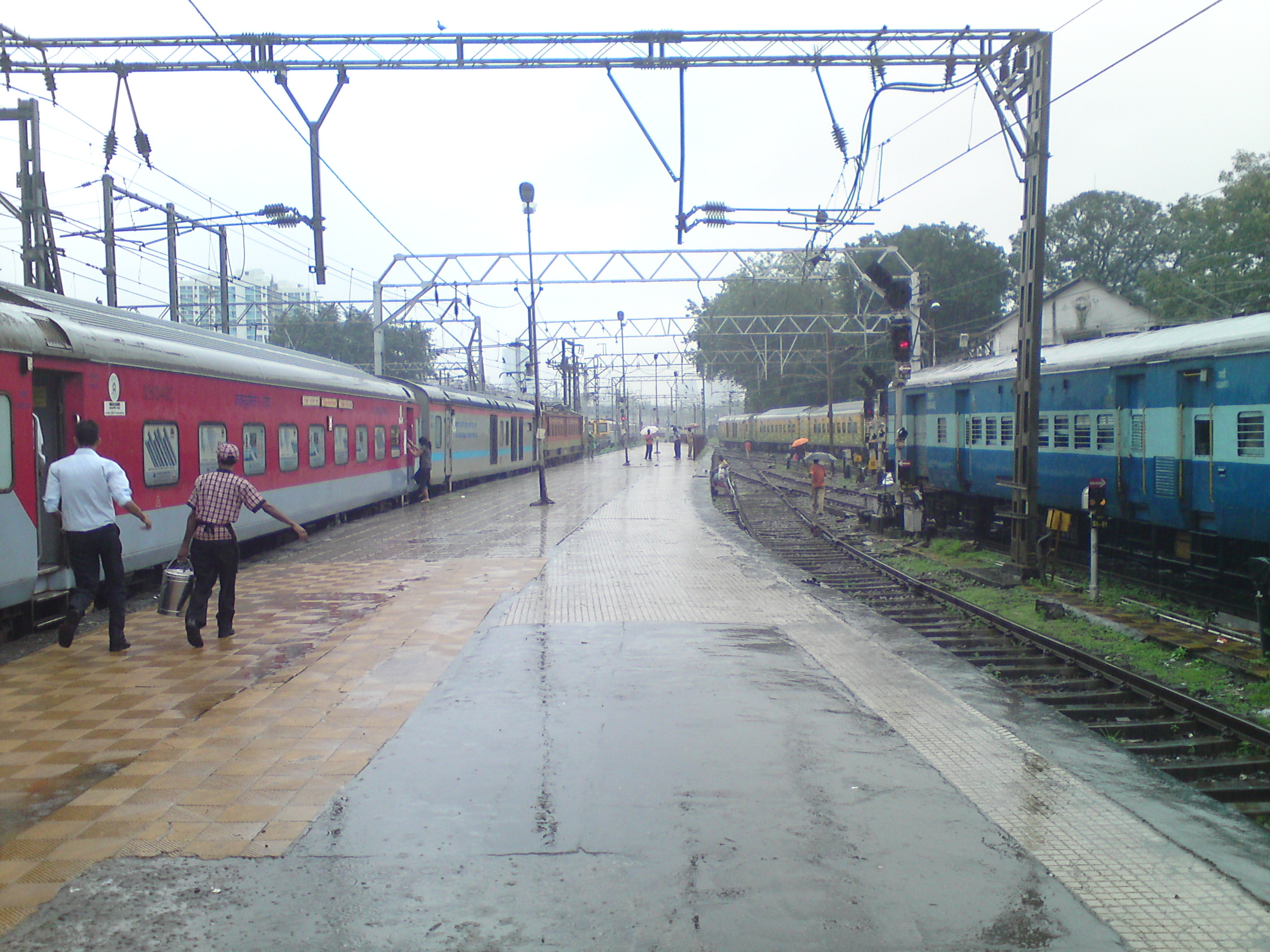
Mumbai Rajdhani Express with WCAM-2P locomotive, read to depart from Mumbai Central

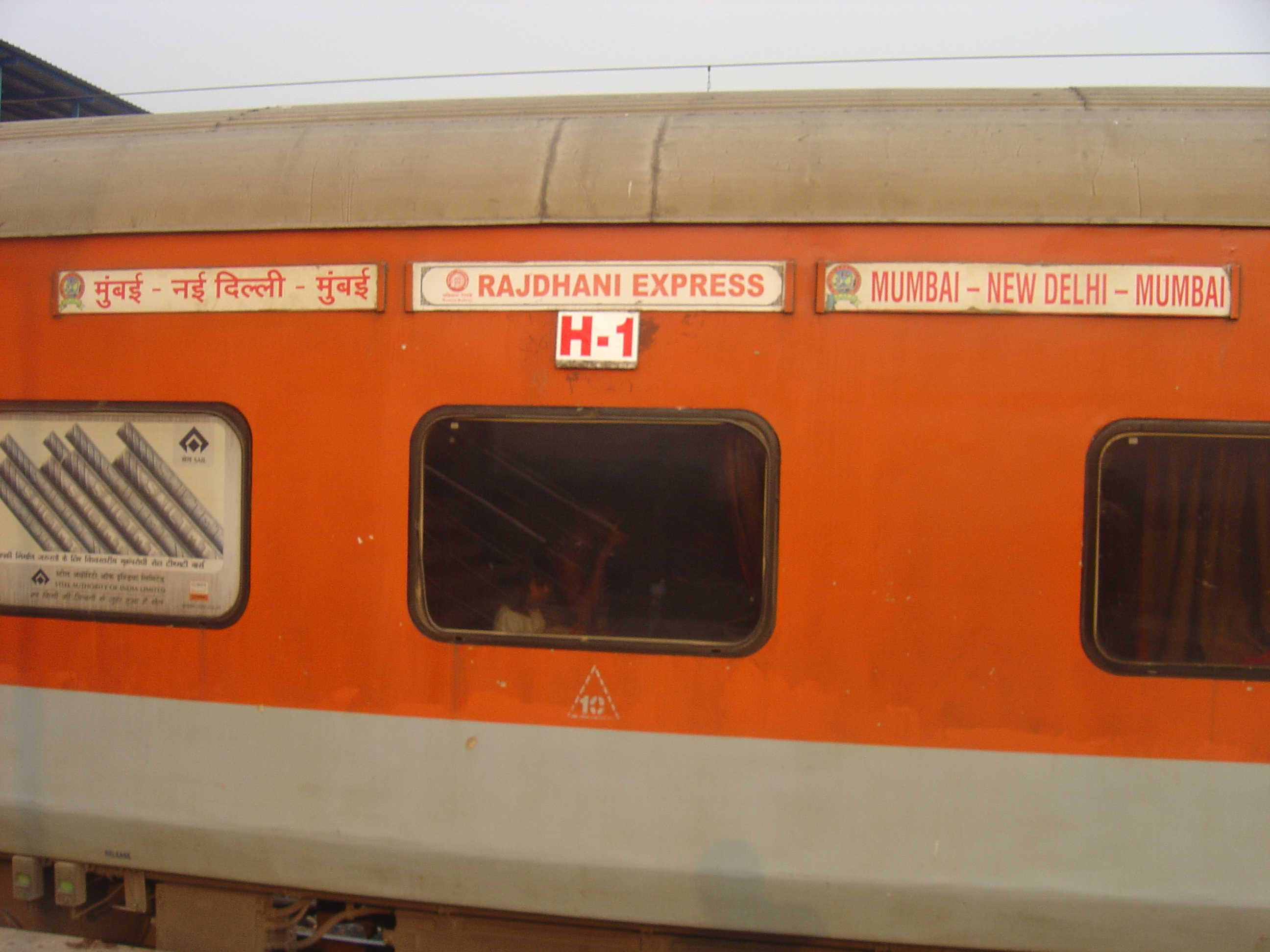
An AC First Class coach of Mumbai Rajdhani Express

Until 1974, the Bombay Rajdhani operated as a weekly service, but due to its increasing popularity and passenger demand, its frequency was increased to thrice a week in 1975. To accommodate more passengers, the number of coaches was expanded to 18, which included 8 air-conditioned chair car coaches (ACC), five air-conditioned 2-tier coaches (AC 2 Tier), one air-conditioned first-class coach (AC First Class), and two pantry cars (PC) starting from 2 October 1981. With the larger train size, the Bombay Rajdhani began to be pulled by twin re-geared WDM-2 locomotives from the Ratlam shed, earning it the nickname "Double Headed Rajdhani." In 1982, the frequency of the service was increased from thrice a week to four days a week, eventually reaching five days a week by the end of 1985. By late 1989, the train's numbering was revised to 2951 DN / 2952 UP, and new air brake systems were introduced for enhanced safety and efficiency. By 1987, the entire New Delhi – Bombay route had been electrified, but with variations in traction systems. The Bombay section utilized 1500V DC traction, while the remainder of the route up to New Delhi was under 25 KV AC traction. As a result, the train was initially pulled by a Vadodara-based WAP-1 locomotive from New Delhi to Vadodara. From Vadodara onwards, the train was entrusted to twin Ratlam-based WDM-2 locomotives for the journey to Bombay.

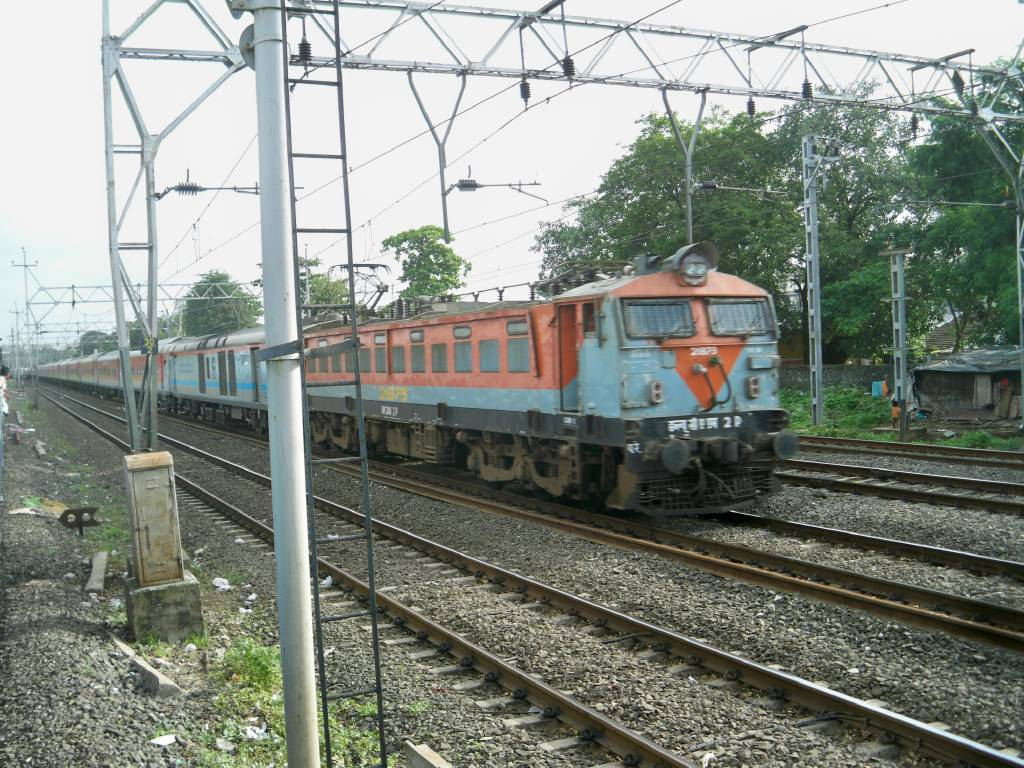
Mumbai - New Delhi Rajdhani Express with WCAM-2P locomotive

During this period, the popularity of the Bombay Rajdhani surged, leading to increased demand from passengers traveling between Delhi and Bombay for an additional Rajdhani Express service. Consequently, on 1 July 1991, an AC Express with a similar coach composition to the Bombay Rajdhani was launched between Delhi and Bombay, with a slightly longer travel duration. This AC Express was later formalized on 1 January 1992, as the 2953 DN / 2954 UP Bombay – H. Nizamuddin August Kranti Rajdhani Express. In 1992, the Bombay Rajdhani and its counterpart August Kranti Rajdhani saw a change in their coach configurations, with AC Chair Car coaches being replaced by AC Three Tier (AC 3 Tier) coaches. Meanwhile, in 1993, Indian Railways introduced WCAM-2P dual AC-DC locomotives in the Bombay region, replacing the iconic WDM-2 locomotives between Bombay and Vadodara. Similarly, between Vadodara and New Delhi, the WAP-1 link was replaced by WAP-4 locomotives. By the early 2000s, three-phase electric locomotives were introduced in India, resulting in the replacement of the WAP-4 locomotives with WAP-5 and subsequently WAP-7 locomotives.

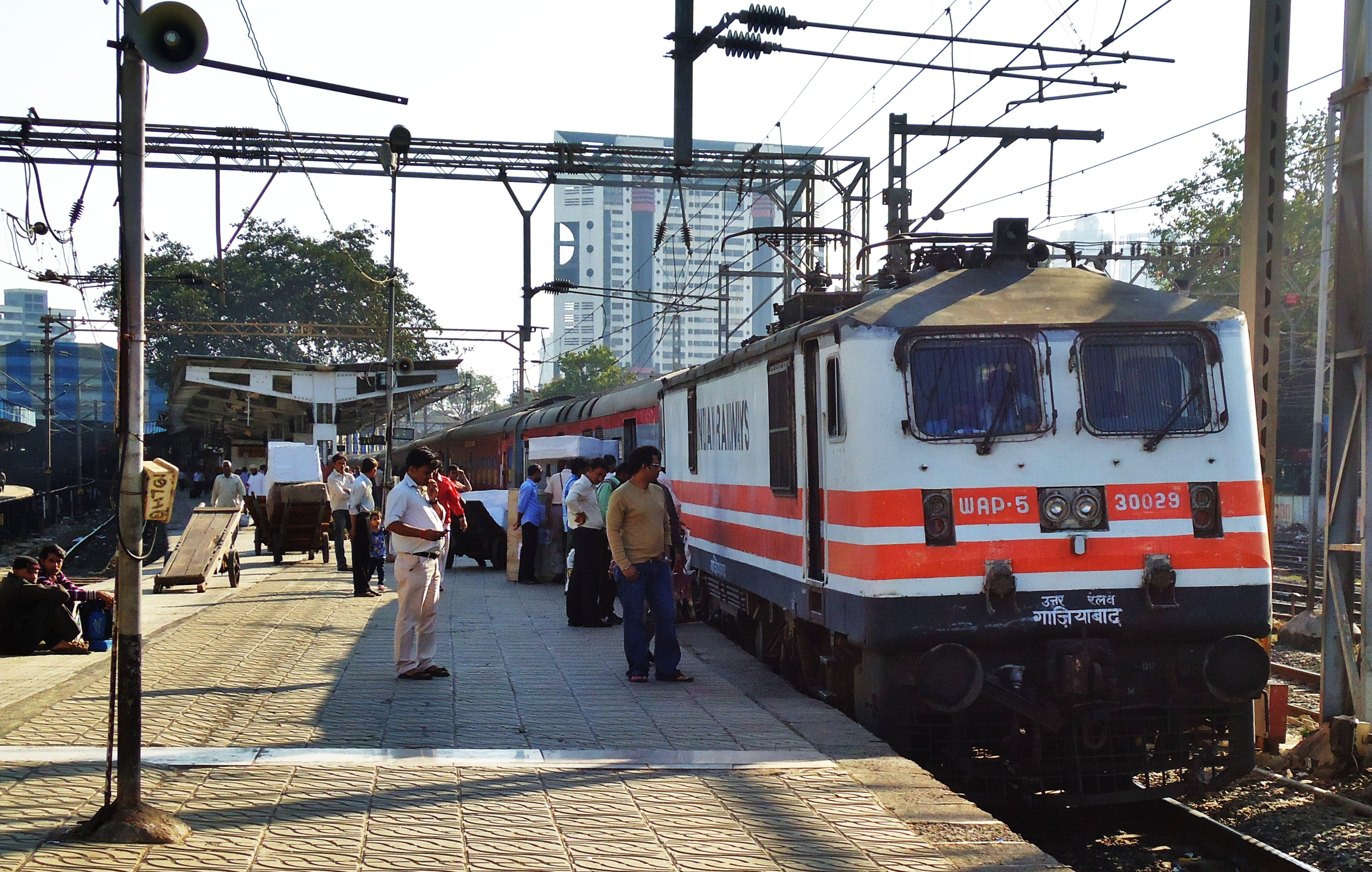
Mumbai Rajdhani Express bound to Delhi, hauled by WAP-5 locomotive, after full conversion of the Delhi - Mumbai route to AC traction

On 2 October 2000, the Bombay Rajdhani Express was renamed as the Mumbai Rajdhani and began operating daily between Delhi and Mumbai, making it the second Rajdhani service after the Howrah Rajdhani Express to run daily to the national capital. On 5 December 2003, marked the introduction of modern Alstom-developed Linke-Hofmann-Busch (LHB) coaches in the Mumbai Rajdhani Express, which allowed for an increase in maximum speed from 120 km/h to 130 km/h. Subsequently, the maximum speed of the Mumbai Rajdhani and its counterpart, the August Kranti Rajdhani Express, was briefly increased to 140 km/h in 2010 as part of an experimental project, but was later reverted back to 130 km/h. On 19 July 2021, under the Rajdhani upgradation project, the Mumbai Rajdhani Express was equipped with modern Tejas LHB coaches, leading to its rebranding as the Mumbai Tejas Rajdhani Express. Track upgrades are currently underway to increase the maximum speed to 160 km/h.

== Coach composition ==
The train consists of twelve AC 3 Tier coaches (B1 to B12), five AC 2 Tier coaches (A1 to A5), one AC First Class (H1), one pantry car (PC), two end on generation cars (EOG) / power cars and one high capacity parcel van (HCPV). The train is equipped with the modern LHB Tejas rakes, and it shares its rake with the 12953 / 12954 Mumbai Central – H. Nizamuddin August Kranti Rajdhani Express.

== Timings ==
The 12951 Mumbai Central – New Delhi Tejas Rajdhani Express daily departs from Mumbai Central Railway Station at 17:00 hrs and arrives in New Delhi on the next day at 08:32 hrs. On its return journey, the train daily departs from New Delhi Railway Station at 16:55 hrs and arrives in Mumbai Central on the next day at 08:35 hrs.

== Route & halts ==
- Mumbai Central
- Borivali
- Surat
- Vadodara Junction
- Ratlam Junction
- Nagda Junction
- Kota Junction
- New Delhi

== Traction ==
It is hauled by a Vadodara Loco Shed or Valsad Loco Shed based WAP-7 and WAP-5 electric locomotive from end to end.

== Incidents ==
On 18 April 2011, three coaches of the train caught fire, including the pantry car. There were no casualties among the 900 passengers.
