= Ahmedabad–Gandhinagar Capital MEMU =

Mainline electric multiple unit train line

Ahmedabad–Gandhinagar MEMU
Overview
- Service type: MEMU
- Current operator: Western Railway zone

Route
- Termini: Ahmedabad (ADI); Gandhinagar Capital (GNC)
- Stops: 7
- Distance travelled: 33 km (21 mi)
- Average journey time: 1 hour
- Service frequency: Daily
- Train number: 69131/69132

On-board services
- Class: General Unreserved
- Seating arrangements: Yes
- Sleeping arrangements: No
- Catering facilities: No
- Observation facilities: ICF coach
- Entertainment facilities: No
- Baggage facilities: Below the seats

Technical
- Rolling stock: 1
- Track gauge: 1,676 mm (5 ft 6 in)
- Operating speed: 33 km/h (21 mph) average with halts

Ahmedabad–Gandhinagar Capital MEMU is a Mainline Electric Multiple Unit train belonging to Western Railway zone that runs between Ahmedabad Junction in Gujarat and Gandhinagar Capital of Gujarat . It is currently being operated with 69131/69132 train numbers on a daily basis.

== Route and halts ==
The important halts of the train are:

- Ahmedabad Junction
- Sabarmati Junction
- Chandlodiya
- Khodiyar
- Gandhinagar Capital

== See also ==
- Gandhinagar Capital railway station
- Anand–Gandhinagar Capital MEMU
