= Gandhinagar Capital railway station =

Railway Station in Gujarat, India

Gandhinagar Capital
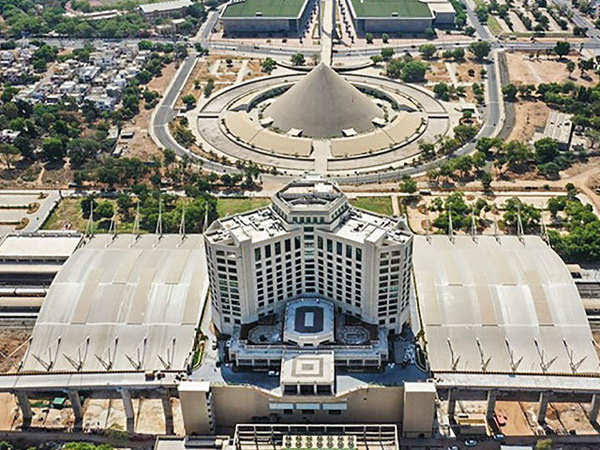
- Gandhinagar Capital railway station overview

General information
- Location: Sector-14, Gandhinagar, Gujarat; India
- Coordinates: 23°14′05″N 72°37′48″E
- Elevation: 75.880 metres (248.95 ft)
- System: Indian Railways station
- Owner: Indian Railways
- Operator: Western Railway
- Line: Khodiyar–Kalol section
- Platforms: 4
- Tracks: 7
- Connections: Yellow Line Mahatma Mandir; Taxi stand, Auto stand

Construction
- Structure type: Standard (On Ground)
- Parking: Available
- Cycle facilities: Available
- Accessible: Available

Other information
- Status: Functioning
- Station code: GNC
- Zone(s): Western Railway
- Division(s): Ahmedabad
Location
- Location within India Location within Gujarat

Gandhinagar Capital railway station (Station code: GNC) is a major railway station with a 5-star hotel on its top in the city of Gandhinagar, Gujarat. Its serve as one of the suburban station of Ahmedabad from where some Ahmedabad bound trains operate from here.

== Location ==
It serves the capital city of Gujarat. The station is located in Sector-14 of Gandhinagar. It was constructed by Indian Railway Stations Development Corporation, a Public Sector Enterprise(PSE) formed by JV between IRCON and RITES.

== Major trains ==
Gandhinagar Capital Railway Station

Following trains halt at Gandhinagar Capital railway station in both direction:

- Bandra Terminus - Delhi Sarai Rohilla Garib Rath Express
- Ahmedabad - Haridwar Yoga Express
- Gandhinagar Capital - Indore Shanti Express
- Anand - Gandhinagar Capital MEMU
- Gandhinagar Capital – Varetha MEMU
- Ahmedabad - Gandhinagar Capital MEMU
- Bhavnagar Terminus - Udhampur Janmabhoomi Express
- Gandhinagar Capital – Varanasi Weekly Superfast Express
- Mumbai Central - Gandhinagar Shatabdi Express
- Gandhinagar - Mumbai Central Shatabdi Express
- Gandhinagar Capital - Mumbai Central Vande Bharat Express

== Infrastructure ==
The station consists of three platforms.
After redevelopment of the station was completed it was inaugurated by Prime Minister Narendra Modi on 16 July 2021. The redeveloped station has been designed to be disabled-friendly and a five-star hotel has been built atop the platform. The luxury hotel was planned to include 318 rooms and be operated by a private entity. The hotel was built to host national and international guests with the entire building been constructed keeping with green building features.
