= Anand–Gandhinagar Capital MEMU =

Train in India

Overview
- Service type: MEMU
- Current operator: Western Railway zone

Route
- Termini: Anand Junction (ANND); Gandhinagar Capital (GNC)
- Stops: 15
- Distance travelled: 99 km (62 mi)
- Average journey time: 3 hours 15 minutes
- Service frequency: Daily (Note: Runs seven days in a week for every direction.)
- Train number: 69191/69192

On-board services
- Class: General Unreserved
- Seating arrangements: Yes
- Sleeping arrangements: No
- Catering facilities: No
- Observation facilities: ICF coach
- Entertainment facilities: No
- Baggage facilities: Below the seats

Technical
- Rolling stock: 1
- Track gauge: 1,676 mm (5 ft 6 in)
- Operating speed: 30 km/h (19 mph) average with halts

Anand–Gandhinagar Capital MEMU is a MEMU train belonging to Western Railway zone that runs between Anand Junction in Gujarat and Gandhinagar Capital of Gujarat. It is currently being operated with 69191/69192 train numbers on daily basis.

== Route and halts ==
The important halts of the train are:

- Anand Junction
- Nadiad Junction
- Ahmedabad Junction
- Sabarmati Junction
- Gandhinagar Capital

== Average speed and frequency ==
69191/Anand–Gandhinagar MEMU has an average speed of 30 km/h and completes 99 km in 3 hour and 15 minutes. 69192/Gandhinagar–Anand MEMU has average speed of 34 km/h and completes 99 km in 2 hour and 55 minutes. There are seven trains which run on a daily basis

== Schedule ==
Train number	Departure station	Departure time	Departure day	Arrival station	Arrival time	Arrival day
14803	Anand Junction	18:10	Daily	Gandhinagar Capital	21:25	Daily
14804	Gandhinagar Capital	13:00	Daily	Anand Junction	17:35	Daily

== Traction ==
MEMU: Rated power is 1600 HP and has 10 coaches with maximum speed is 130 kmph. Transmission is AC electric. Rakes are made at ICF coach.

== Rake sharing ==
The rake is shared with 69131/69132 Ahmedabad–Gandhinagar Capital MEMU

== See also ==
- Gandhinagar Capital railway station
- Ahmedabad–Gandhinagar Capital MEMU
