= Mumbai Central railway station =

Railway station in Mumbai, India

Mumbai Central
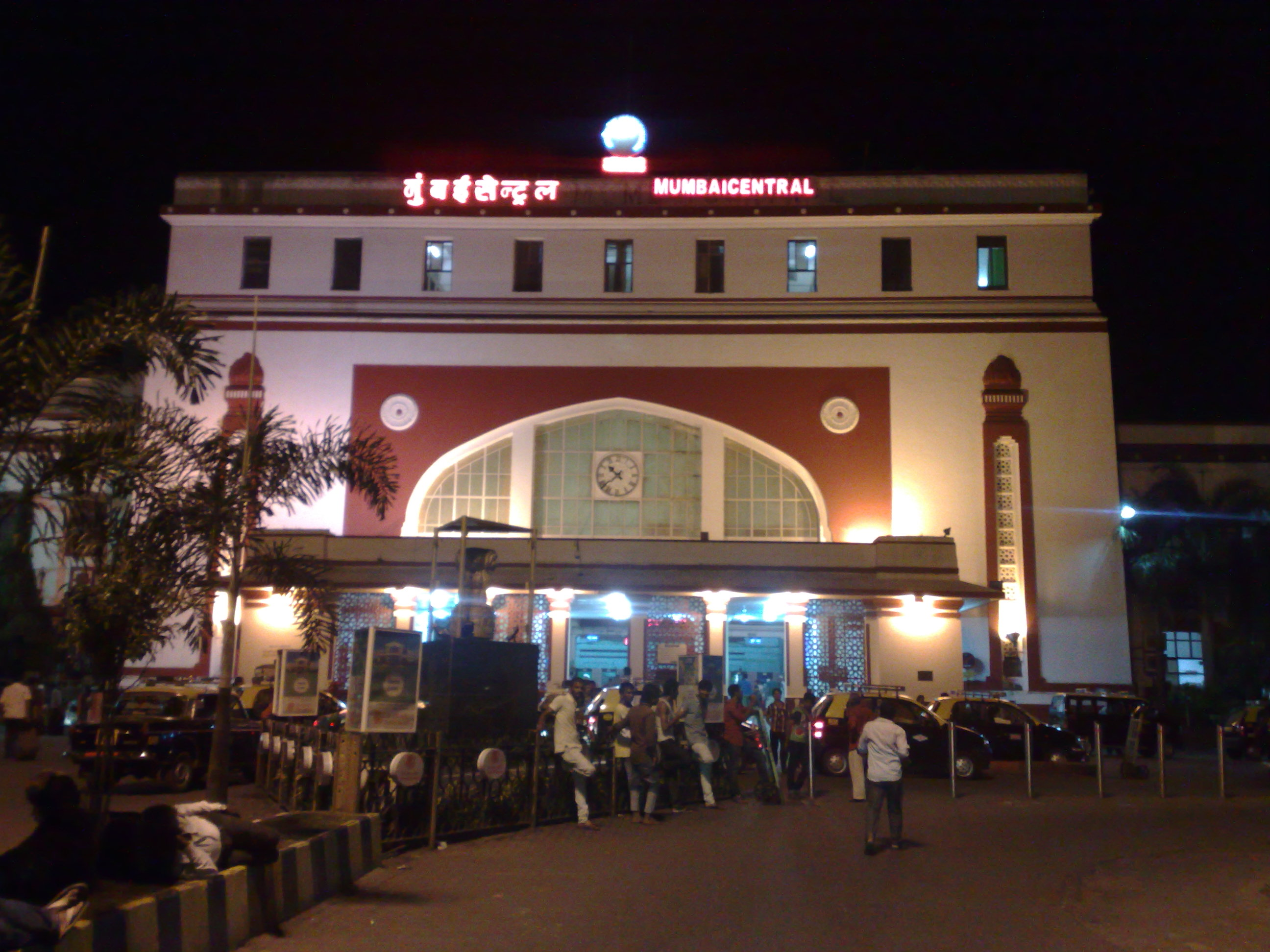

General information
- Location: Anandrao Nair Marg, Mumbai, Maharashtra; India
- Coordinates: 18°58′11″N 72°49′10″E
- Elevation: 6.62 metres (21.7 ft)
- System: Indian Railways; Mumbai Suburban Railway
- Owner: Indian Railways
- Operator: Western Railway
- Lines: Mainline: Mumbai–Ahmedabad main line, Vadodara–Mumbai section, New Delhi–Mumbai main line; Suburban: Western
- Platforms: 9 (5 mainline trains + 4 for Mumbai suburban/local trains)
- Tracks: 9
- Connections: BEST, MSRTC; Line 3 at Jagannath Shankar Sheth

Construction
- Structure type: At-grade
- Parking: Yes (on the outstation side)

Other information
- Status: Functioning
- Station code: MMCT
- Zone(s): Western Railway zone
- Division(s): Mumbai WR

History
- Opened: 18 December 1930
- Electrified: 18 December 1930
- Former names: Bellasis Road (Suburban station); Bombay Central (from 1930 to 1995)

Passengers
- 2012-13: 2,38,231

Services
Preceding station	Mumbai Suburban Railway	Following station
Grant Road towards Churchgate	Western line	Mahalaxmi towards Dahanu Road
Out-of-system interchange
Preceding station	Mumbai Metro	Following station
Grant Road towards Cuffe Parade	Aqua Line transfer at Jagannath Shankar Sheth	Mahalaxmi towards Aarey JVLR
Route map
Location
- Location within Mumbai

Mumbai Central (formerly Bombay Central, station code: MMCT) is a major railway station on the Western line of the Mumbai Suburban Railway, situated in Mumbai, Maharashtra, in an area known by the same name. It serves as a major stop for both local and intercity trains, with separate platforms for either. It is also a terminal for several long-distance trains including the Mumbai Rajdhani Express.

It is one of the five major terminal stations in Mumbai, the others being Mumbai CSMT, Mumbai LTT, Bandra, and Dadar. Trains depart from the station, connecting various destinations mostly across states in the northern, western and north-western parts of India. The station was renamed from Bombay Central to Mumbai Central in 1997, following the change of Bombay to Mumbai. In October 2017, Western Railway announced that the station code would change from BCT to MMCT on 1 February 2018.

== History ==
The Bombay Central station was built in response to the government directive to demolish the Churchgate-Colaba rail section owing to land reclamation needs. The BB&CI had to agree to this back in the 1870s, when it had extended the line to Colaba, when the permission to build the terminus was provided on the condition that, in the event of any further reclamation schemes, the railway company would shift its railway to any other location between Marine Lines and Colaba. The railway was provided a notice about the directed demolition in 1920. The BB&CI could not do this until a new terminus was found. A new station was completed with the name Bombay Central on 18 December 1930, and Colaba Terminus went defunct after 31 December of the same year.

The foundation stone of the station was laid by the then agent (today called the General Manager) of the BB&CI Railway, Sir Ernest Jackson, on 11th March 1928, during a simple ceremony. It was attended by the officers of the railway, the partners of the architect firms, as well as a representative of the contractor, the Ferro Concrete Company. A brass cylinder was placed under the foundation stone, with the names of officers associated with the work, as well as new coins of one rupee, eight, four, two, and one anna, half anna, and a quarter anna. The foundation work of the station began on 25th April.

Sir Ernest Jackson delivering his a speech at the Opening ceremony

Dinner arranged for the construction staff of Bombay Central, two days prior the inauguration

The station was designed by the British architect Claude Batley, and constructed by Shapoorji Pallonji in 1930 in a record time of 21 months. The project was then costed at INR 15.6 million. The station finally opened on 18 December 1930. The station design composed of an eastern entrance with gardens on either side. The main entrance of the building led to a spacious concourse, with platforms on the right, and waiting rooms, Hindu, and Muslim refreshment rooms, and a buffet for First and Second Class Passengers on the other side. The three storied building had refreshment rooms, and waiting rooms on the first floor, while the second floor had retiring rooms for passengers spending a short time in Bombay. The architect also designed a large waiting room with refreshment stalls for the comfort of the third class passengers. The station itself was connected by covered footways to both the main and local stations, as well as the Bellasis Bridge, situated south of the station. Along with this, a suburban station was planned beside the main terminus, with direct connections via a footbridge, becoming the present Mumbai Central Local station.

Enquiry Office and Lounge

A First Class Refreshment Room

A Double Retiring Room

A Room at Bombay Central

View of another room

When the station opened in 1930, The Times of India suggested that the name Bombay Central was inspired by the Grand Central Terminal in New York City. The paper argued that the station should have been called Kamathipura, after the area it was located in. The paper suggested that the name Kamathipura was probably ruled out because the area is a red-light district.

The Bombay Central Signal Cabin was opened in December 1930. It contained a power frame of 119 levers, that could operate 30 colour signals, 33 shunt signals, and 37 electro-pneumatic point layouts.

The Bombay, Baroda and Central India Railway extended its reach from Baroda to Pathankot via Delhi. The Colaba-Ballard Pier railway station proved insufficient in meeting the demands of a growing population, which led the government to make plans for the construction of Bombay Central.

The present suburban route, that once ran till Colaba, was earlier served by Bellasis Road station. It was renamed Bombay Central (local) after the construction of the long-distance Bombay Central Terminus (BCT) on the eastern side. In October 2017, Western Railway announced that the station code would change from BCT to MMCT on 1 February 2018. The change in station code caused problems for people making advanced bookings using the IRCTC app during November 2017.

== Major trains ==
The train which originates from Mumbai Central are :

● Mumbai Central–Ahmedabad Shatabdi Express (12009/12010)

● Mumbai Central–Indore Duronto Express (12227/12228)

● Mumbai Central–Hisar Duronto Express (12239/12240)

● Mumbai Central–Hapa Duronto Express (12267/12268)

● Flying Ranee (12921/12922)

● Mumbai Central–Ahmedabad Double Decker Express (12931/12932)

● Karnavati Express (12934/12935) (Now operates from Bandra Terminus

● Mumbai Central–New Delhi Tejas Rajdhani Express (12951/12952)

● August Kranti Rajdhani Express (12953/12954)

● Mumbai Central–Jaipur Superfast Express (12955/12956)

● Avantika Superfast Express (12961/12962)

● Mumbai Central–Gandhinagar Capital Vande Bharat Express (20901/20902)

● Mumbai Central–New Delhi Duronto Express (22209/22210)

● Saurashtra Mail (22945/22946)

● Gujarat Express (22953/22954)

● Ahmedabad–Mumbai Central Vande Bharat Express (22961/22962)

● Ahmedabad–Mumbai Central Tejas Express (82901/82002)

== Infrastructure ==
=== Gardens ===
There are two gardens located outside the station. One of the gardens houses a historic locomotive, popularly known as the "Little red horse". The locomotive was built by English firm Kerr Stuart and Co. in 1928. The engine operated on the Devgarh-Baria Railway Narrow Gauge line, owned by the Princely state of Devgarh-Baria. The line was merged into Bombay, Baroda and Central India Railway (BB&CI) in August 1949, and later became part of the Western Railway. The engine served for 61 years, before being transferred to the Pratapnagar workshop for shunting duties in 1990. It was placed at the garden in front of the Mumbai Central station in 1991 to commemorate its platinum jubilee.

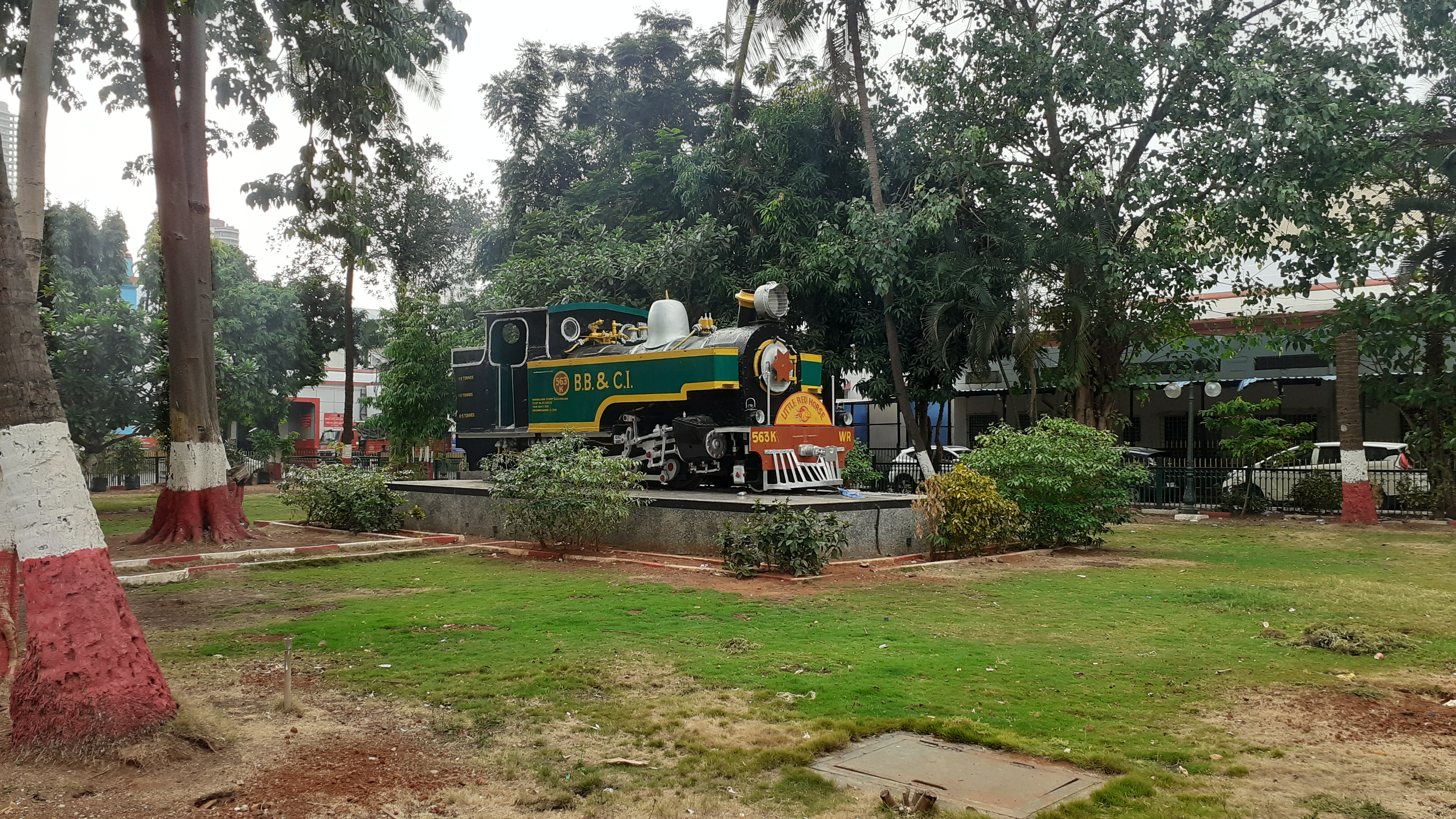
'Little Red Horse' kept outside Mumbai Central Station

== Gallery ==
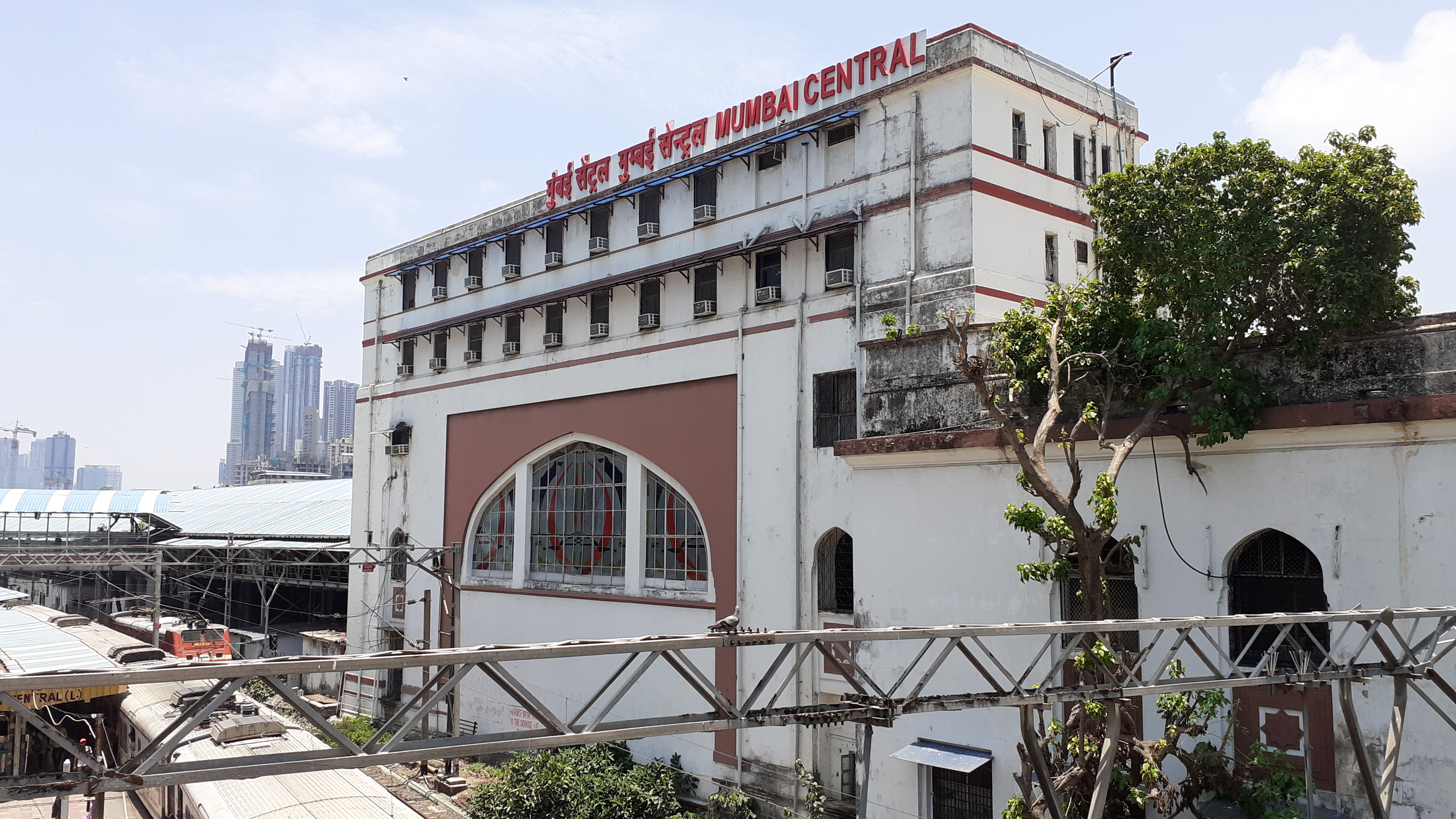
Mumbai Central Station building- view from West

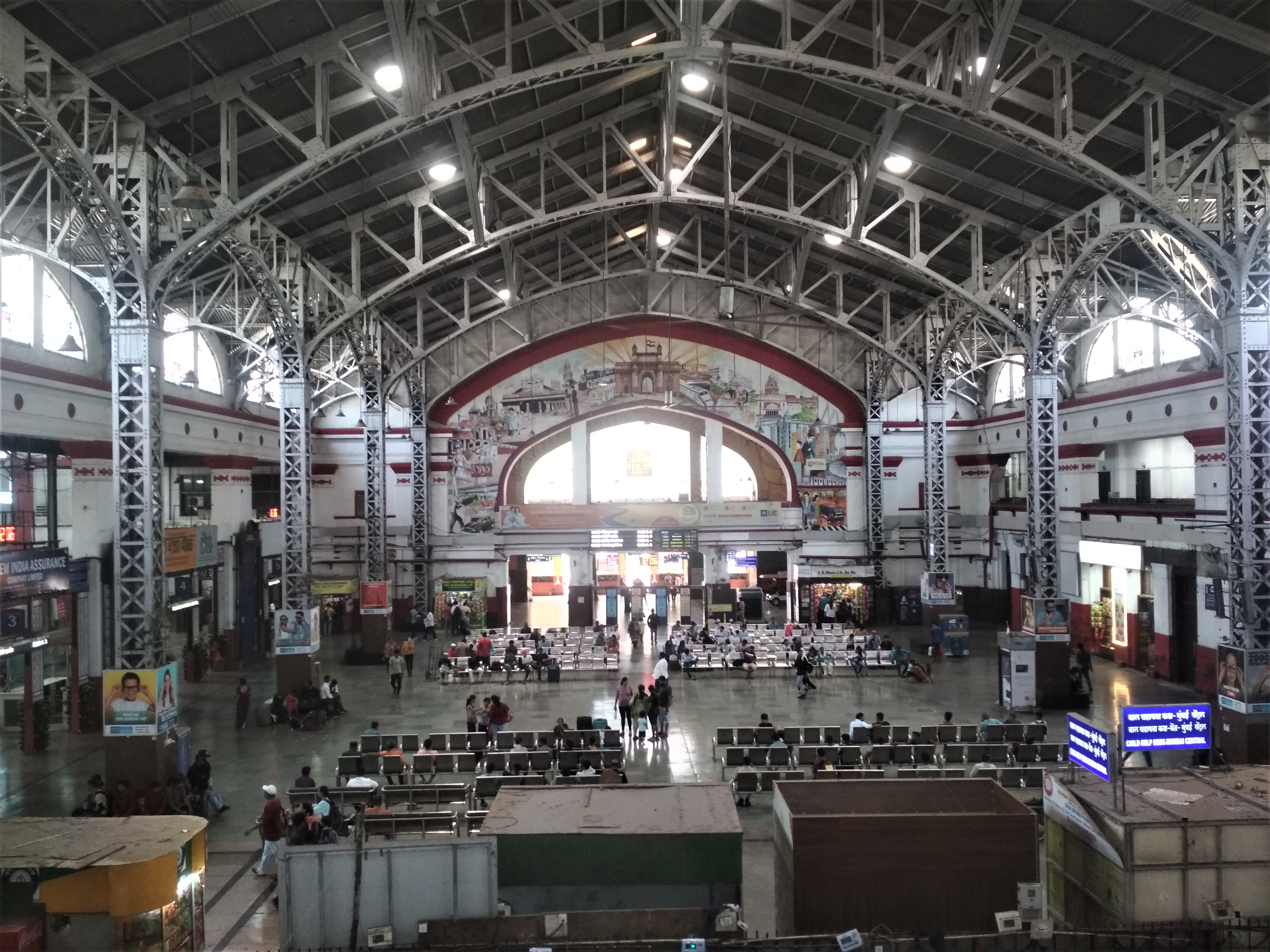
Mumbai Central- view of the interior

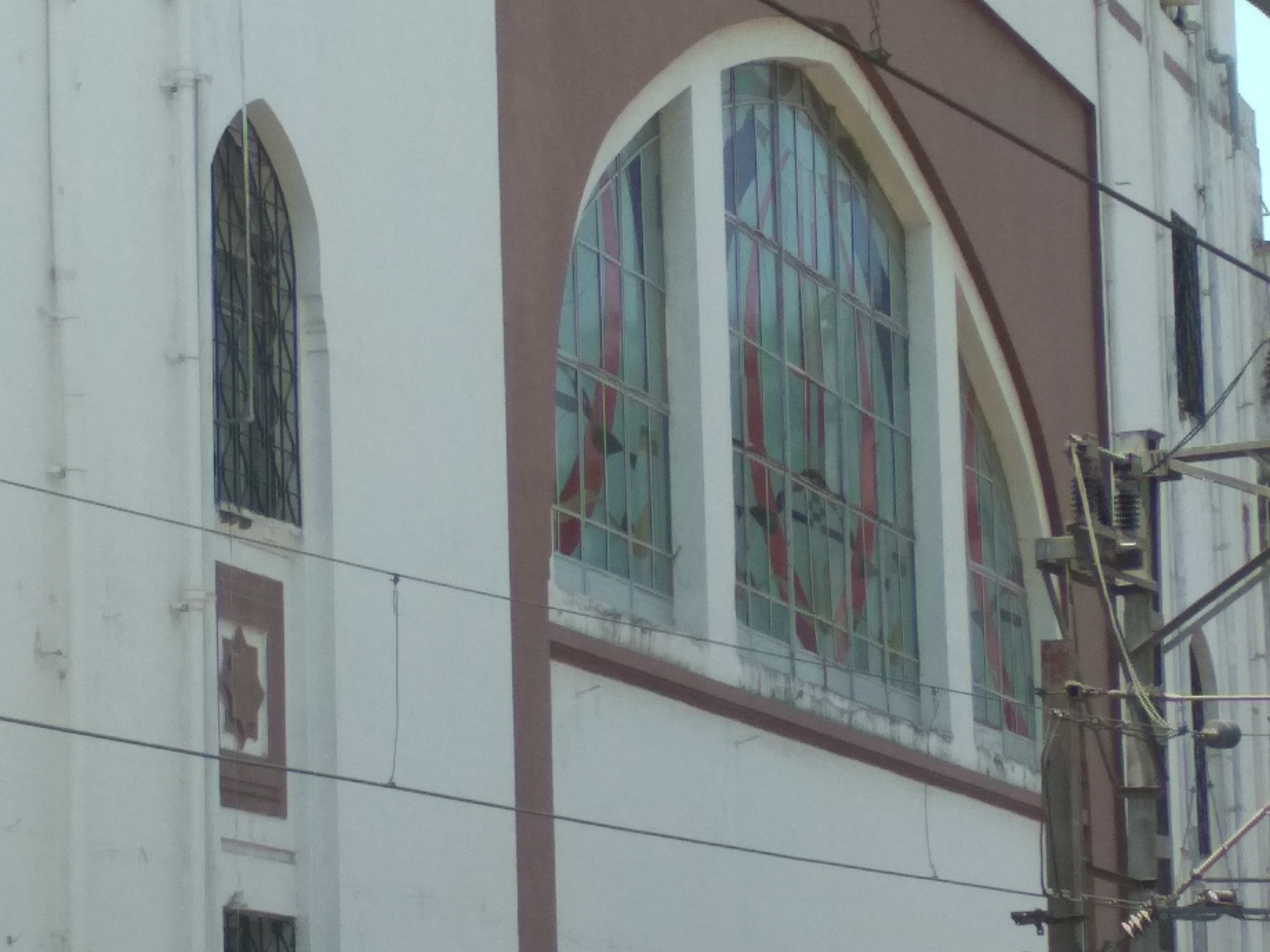
Stained glass windows of the station as seen from the Suburban station platform

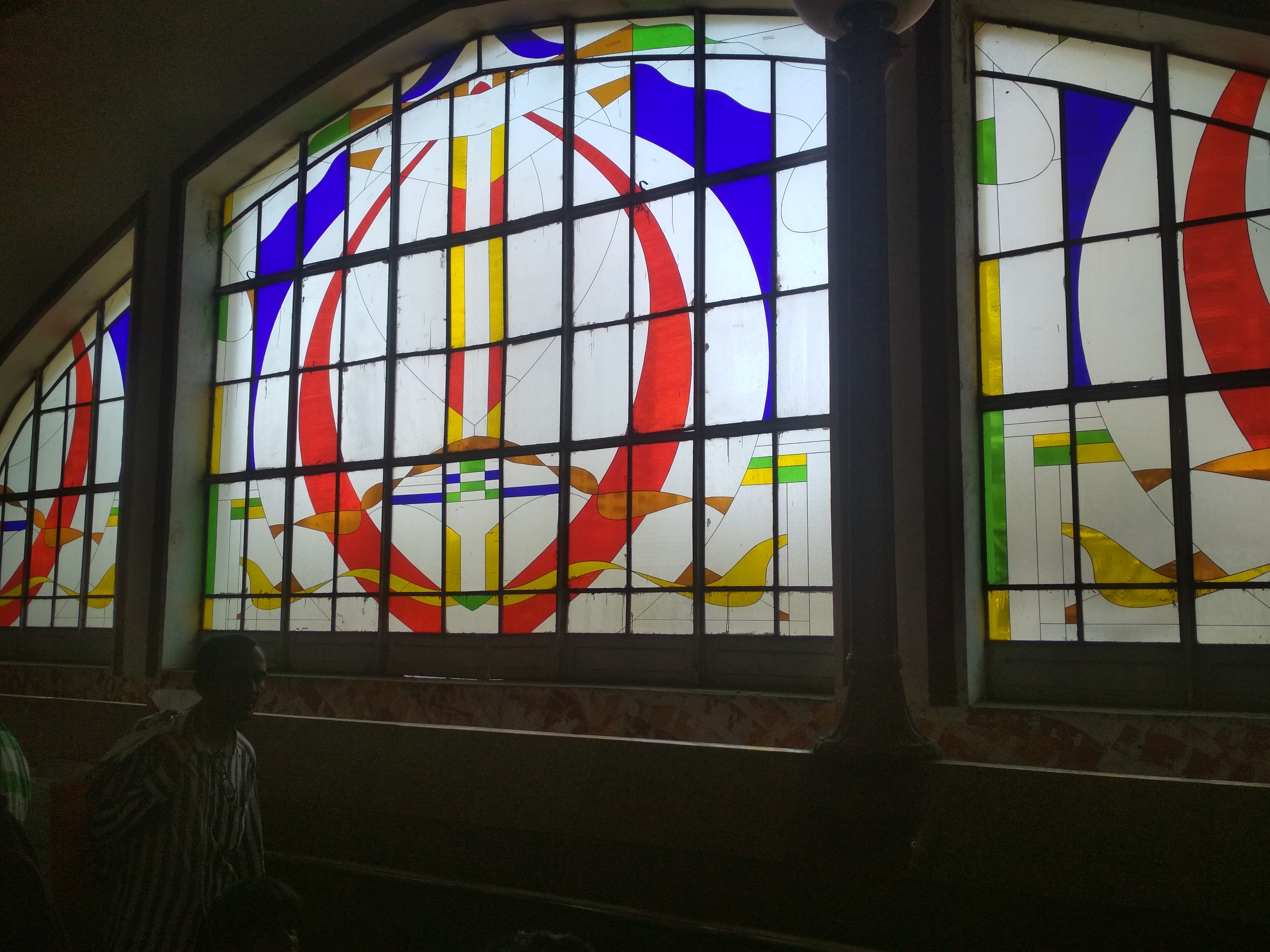
The Stained glass windows as seen from the interior FoB of the station.

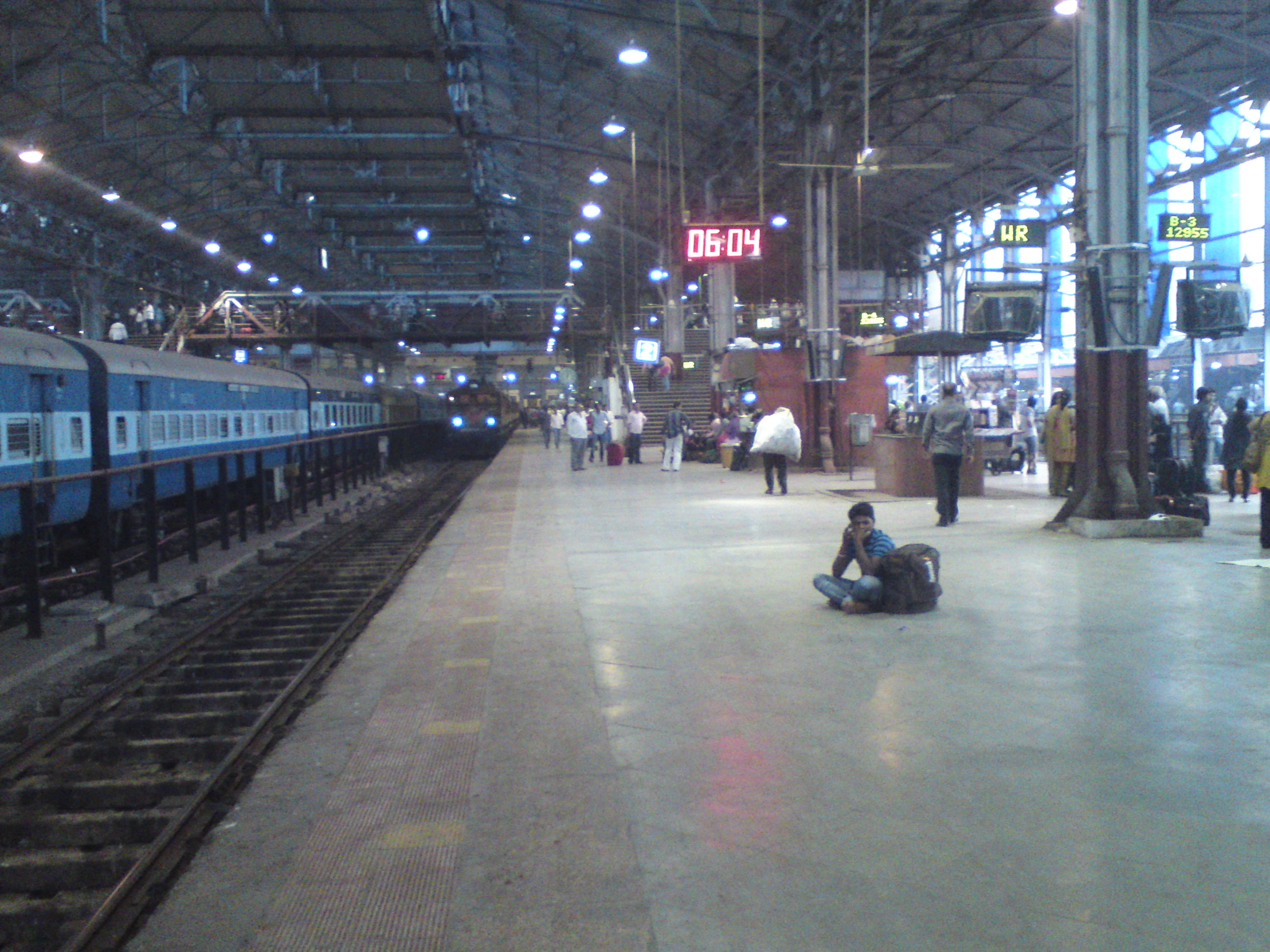
An inside view of Mumbai Central Station

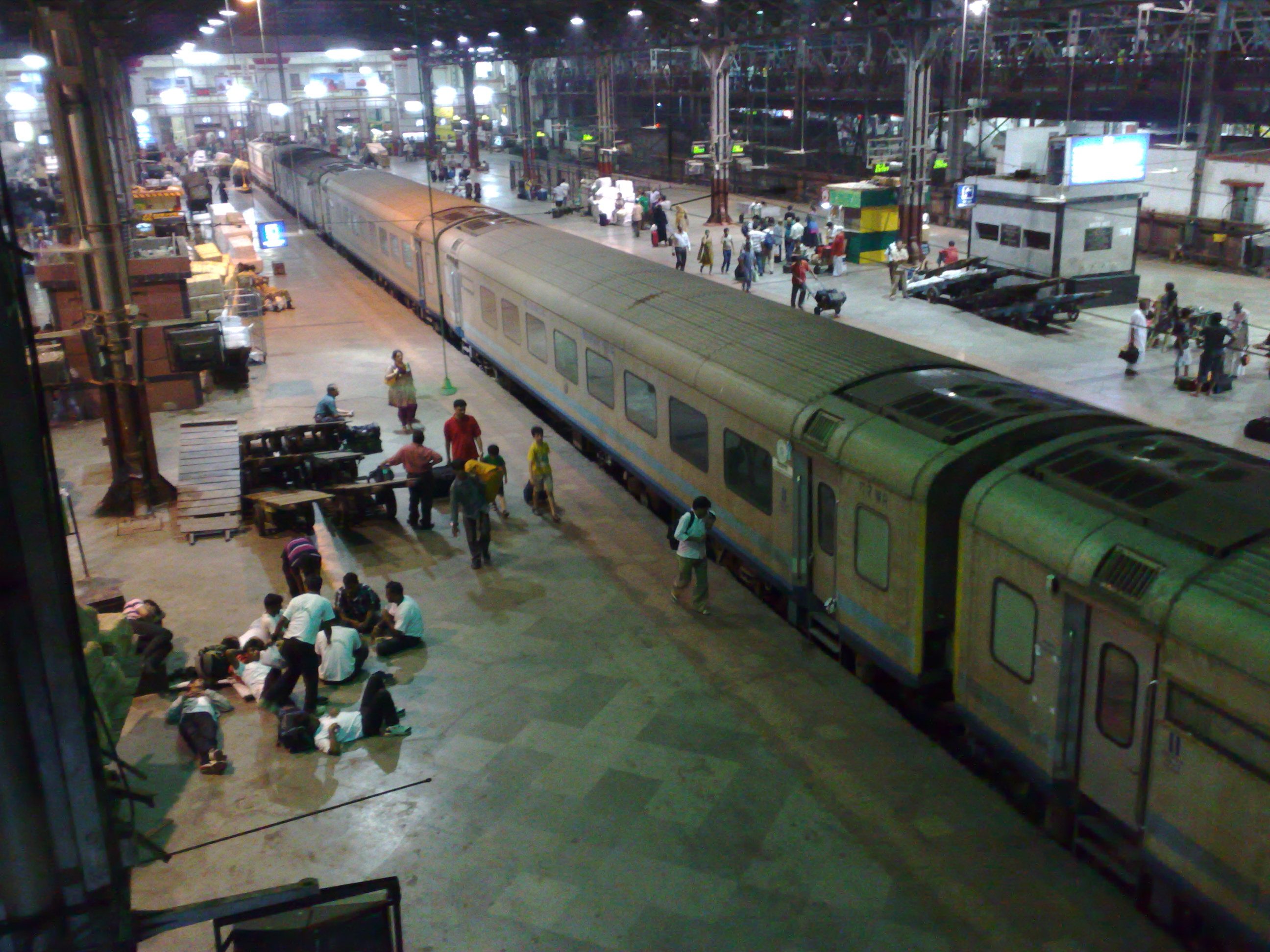
12010 Shatabdi Express at Mumbai Central station

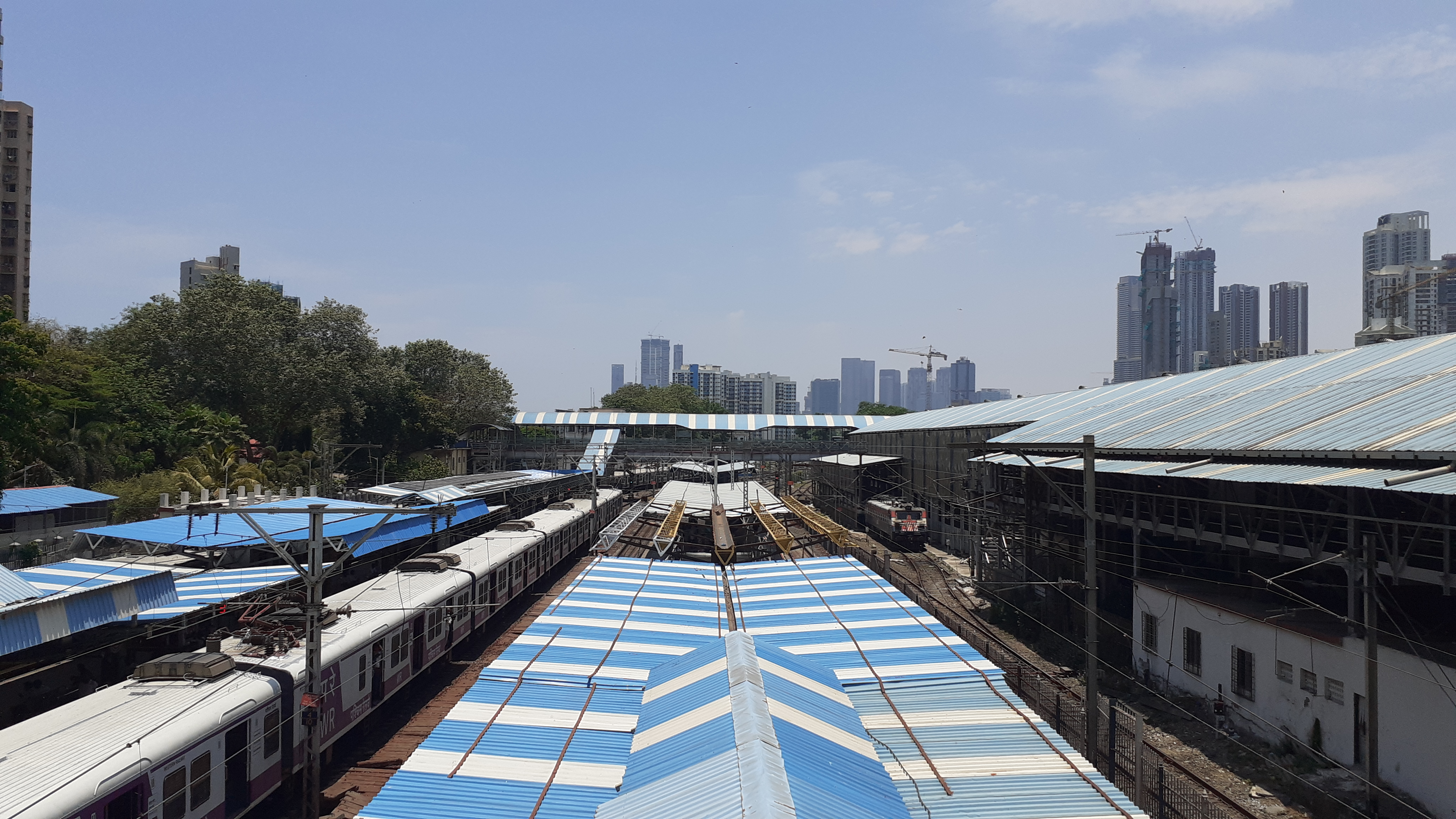
Mumbai Central Local station- View from FoB (northward)

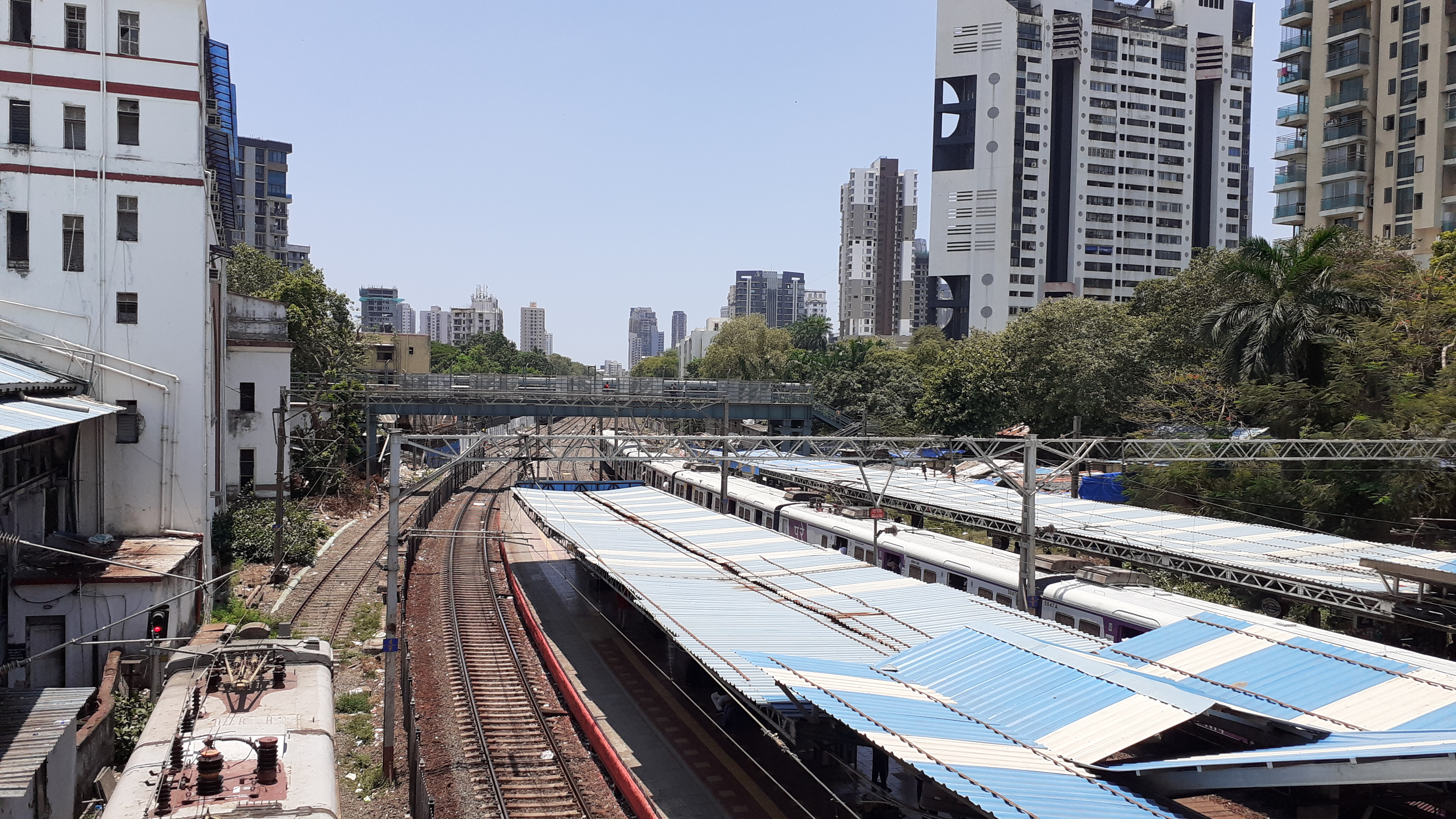
Mumbai Central Local station- View from FoB (southward)

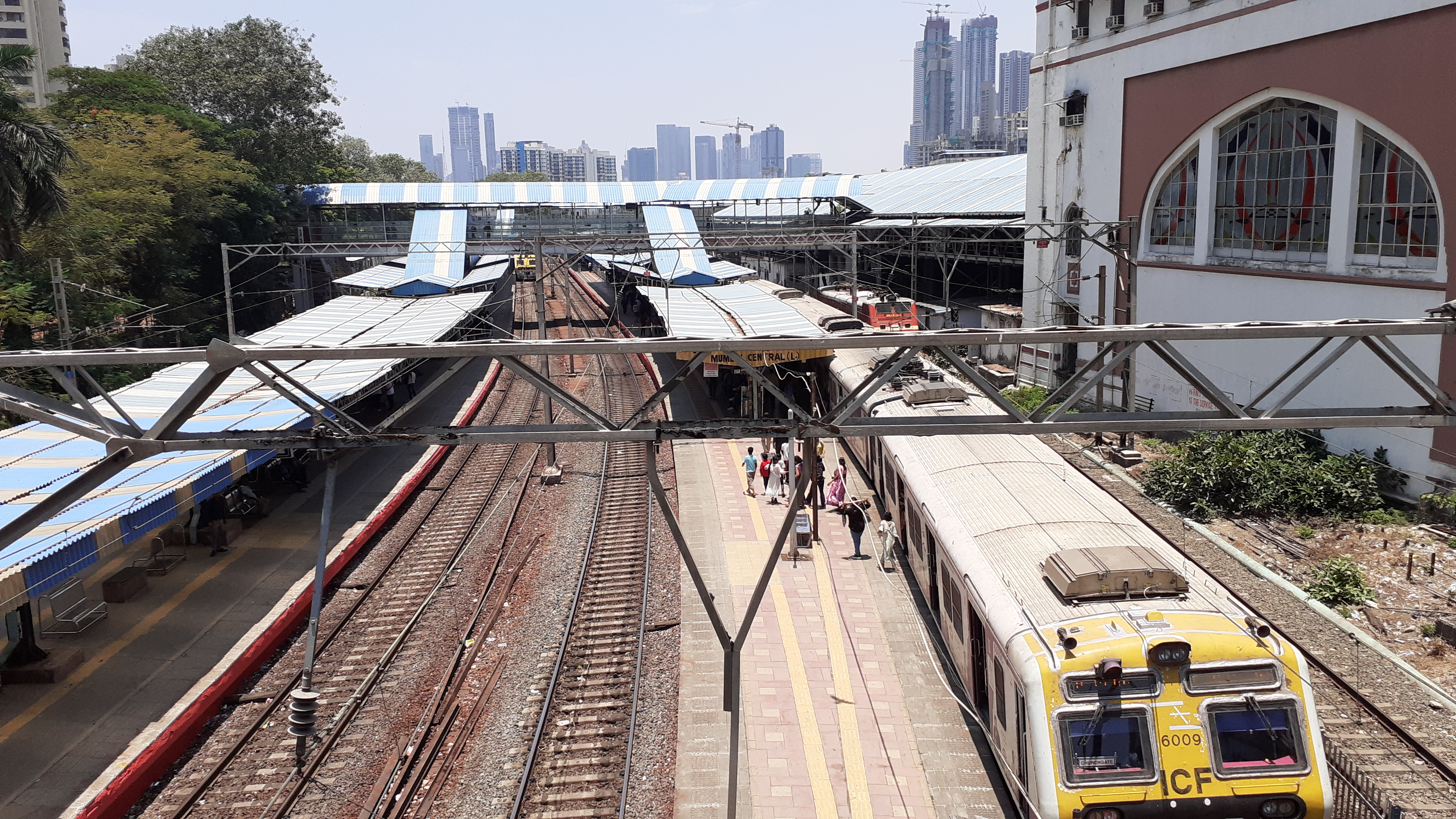
Mumbai Central Local station from south

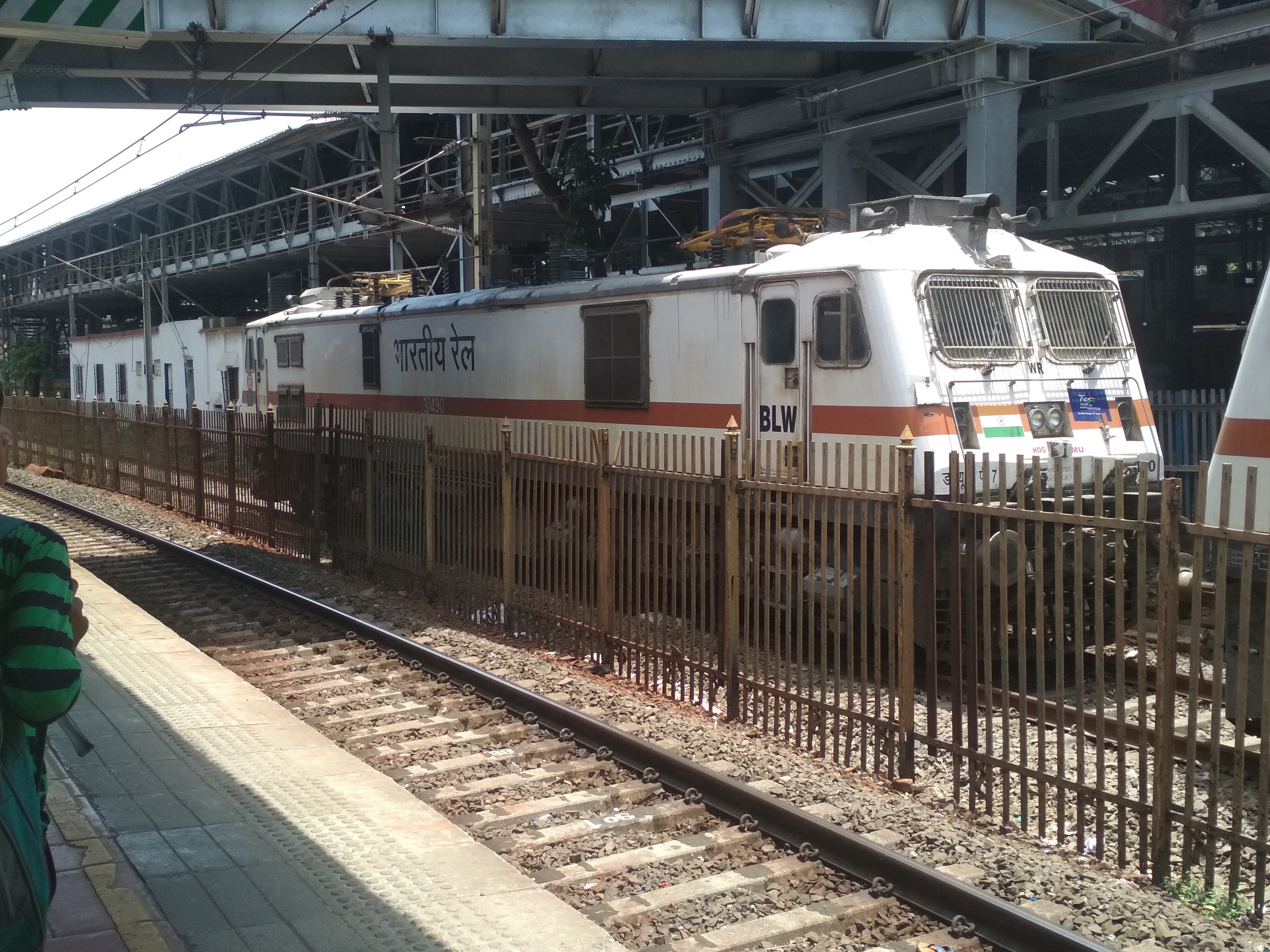
WAP-7 Locomotive outside Mumbai Central Passenger station. As seen from the Suburban station.

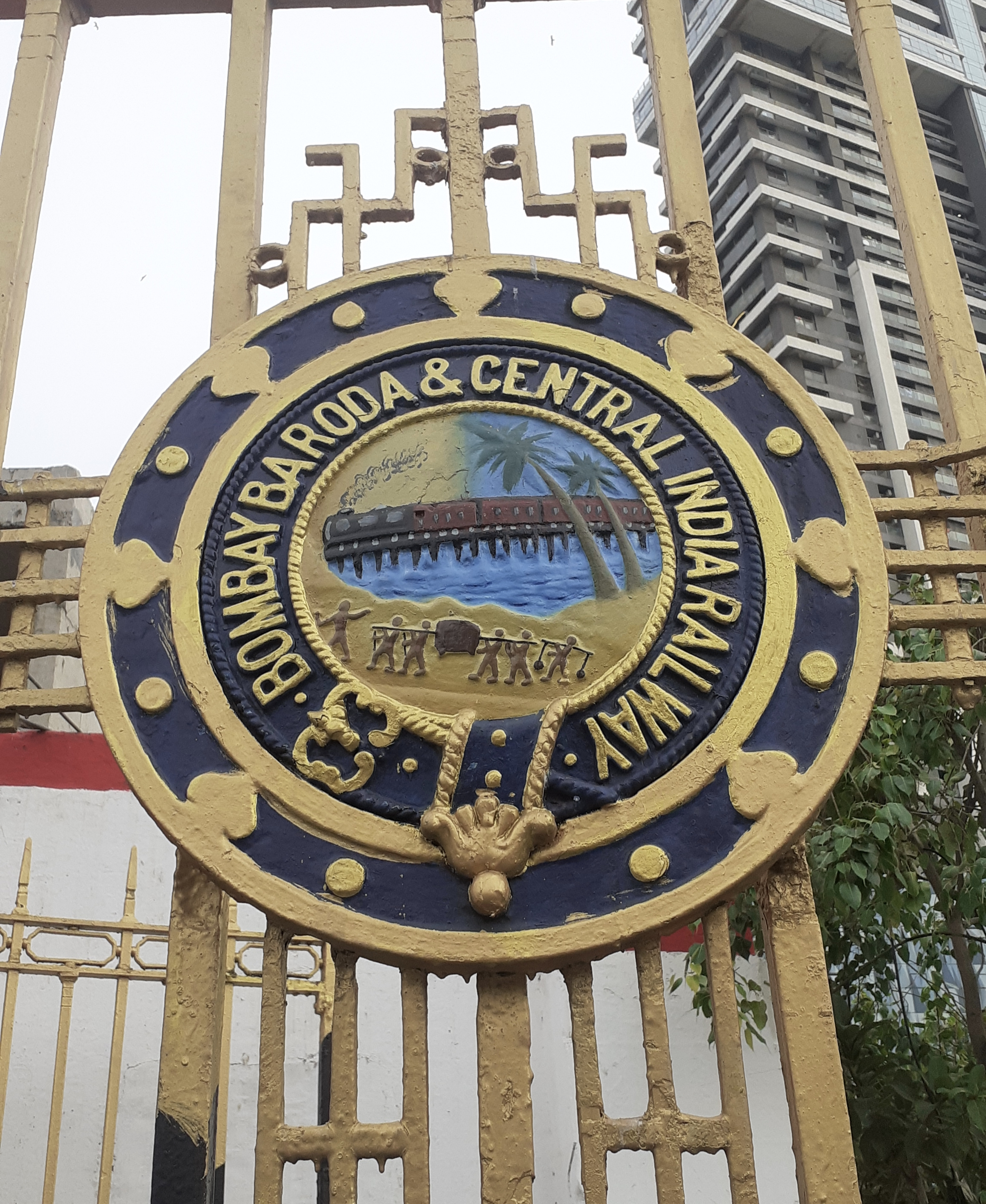
BB&CIR Logo on Mumbai Central West gate
