= Vadodara–Mumbai section =

Railway line section in India

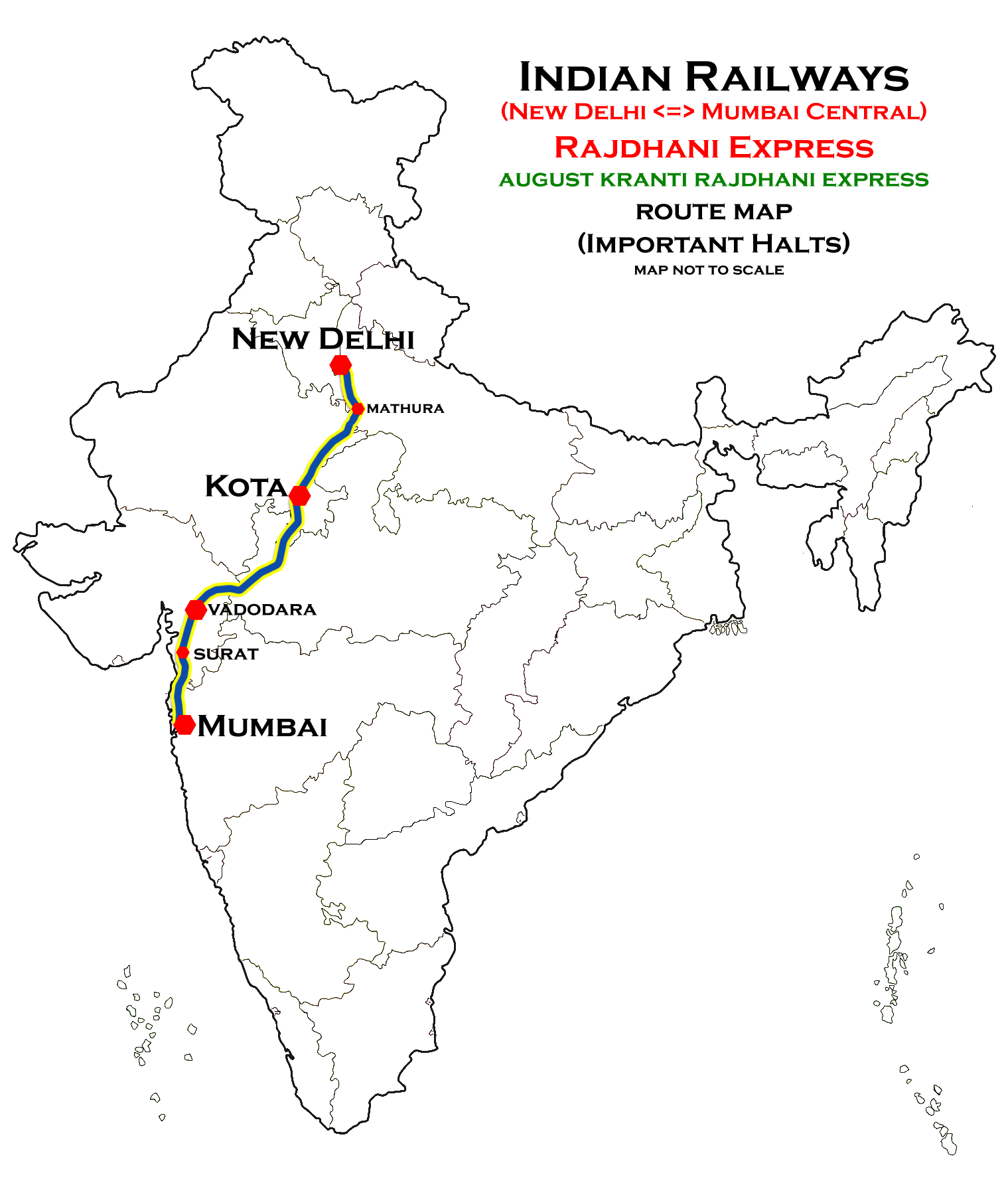
- Rajdhani Express route map showing the Vadodara–Mumbai section

Overview
- Native name: वडोदरा–मुंबई रेल खंड
- Status: Operational
- Owner: Indian Railways
- Locale: Gujarat, Maharashtra
- Termini: Vadodara Junction; Mumbai Central

Service
- Type: Main line
- System: Indian Railways
- Operator: Western Railway

Technical
- Line length: 392 km (244 mi)
- Number of tracks: Double / Triple / Quadruple
- Track gauge: 1,676 mm (5 ft 6 in) broad gauge
- Electrification: 25 kV AC OHLE
- Operating speed: Up to 160 km/h (99 mph)

The Vadodara–Mumbai section is a railway section of the New Delhi–Mumbai main line and the Mumbai–Ahmedabad main line of Indian Railways. Running between Vadodara Junction and Mumbai Central, it extends for approximately 392 km (244 mi) through the states of Gujarat and Maharashtra. The section is one of the busiest sections of both routes and forms part of the High Density Network (HDN) of Indian Railways. Operated by the Western Railway, it carries a high volume of long-distance passenger, suburban and freight traffic, linking several major commercial and industrial centres including Vadodara, Bharuch, Surat, Valsad, Vapi and Mumbai.

The corridor has undergone major infrastructure upgrades in recent years under Indian Railways' capacity enhancement programme. These include additional tracks on busy stretches, station redevelopment, higher-speed infrastructure works and the commissioning of the indigenous Kavach automatic train protection system on large parts of the route. The section also forms part of the Delhi–Mumbai corridor identified for train operations at speeds of up to 160 km/h (99 mph) under Mission Raftaar.

== History ==
The Vadodara–Mumbai section developed as part of the former Bombay, Baroda and Central India Railway (BB&CI Railway), which connected Bombay with the western and northern parts of India during the nineteenth century. Following the nationalisation of Indian Railways, the route became part of the Western Railway zone. Over the years, the section has undergone electrification, track doubling, capacity augmentation and signalling upgrades to accommodate increasing passenger and freight traffic.

== Significance ==
The Vadodara–Mumbai section is one of the busiest railway corridors on the Western Railway network. Besides forming part of the New Delhi–Mumbai main line and the Mumbai–Ahmedabad main line, it connects major industrial, commercial and port regions in Gujarat and Maharashtra. The section is used by premium passenger trains, Mumbai suburban services and freight trains, making it an important part of the High Density Network of Indian Railways.

== Route ==
The section begins at Vadodara Junction and runs south through Bharuch Junction, Surat, Navsari, Valsad, Vapi, Palghar, Borivali and Dadar Western before terminating at Mumbai Central. It is served by Rajdhani Express, Vande Bharat Express, Tejas Express, Mail and Express trains, Mumbai suburban services and a large number of freight trains, making it one of the busiest railway corridors on the Western Railway network.

== Route table ==
No.	Station	Code	Division
1	Vadodara Junction	BRC	Vadodara
2	Bharuch Junction	BH	Vadodara
3	Surat	ST	Mumbai Central
4	Navsari	NVS	Mumbai Central
5	Valsad	BL	Mumbai Central
6	Vapi	VAPI	Mumbai Central
7	Palghar	PLG	Mumbai
8	Borivali	BVI	Mumbai
9	Dadar Western	DDR	Mumbai
10	Mumbai Central	MMCT	Mumbai Central

== Subsections ==
=== Vadodara–Surat section ===
The Vadodara–Surat section lies in the Vadodara Division of the Western Railway. It connects the industrial centres of Vadodara, Bharuch and Surat, and carries a mix of long-distance passenger trains, freight services and MEMU trains. The section is part of the High Density Network (HDN) of Indian Railways and has undergone capacity enhancement and signalling upgrades under Mission Raftaar.

- Double, triple and quadruple tracks
- Fully electrified
- Automatic Block Signalling
- Part of the High Density Network (HDN)

Major stations

Station	Code
Vadodara Junction	BRC
Bharuch Junction	BH
Surat	ST

=== Surat–Vapi section ===
The Surat–Vapi section passes through southern Gujarat and serves several important commercial and industrial towns, including Navsari, Valsad and Vapi. It is among the busiest stretches of the Western Railway network and is used by premium passenger trains, suburban services, MEMU trains and heavy freight traffic.

- Double, triple and quadruple tracks
- Fully electrified
- Automatic Block Signalling
- Equipped with Kavach on designated sections

Major stations

Station	Code
Surat	ST
Valsad	BL
Vapi	VAPI

=== Vapi–Mumbai section ===
The Vapi–Mumbai section forms the southern end of the Mumbai–Ahmedabad main line. It passes through Palghar district before entering the Mumbai Metropolitan Region at Virar and continues via Borivali and Dadar Western to Mumbai Central. The section carries intensive suburban, long-distance passenger and freight traffic throughout the day.

- Double, triple and quadruple tracks
- Fully electrified
- Automatic Block Signalling
- Integrated with the Mumbai Suburban Railway

Major stations

Station	Code
Vapi	VAPI
Palghar	PLG
Borivali	BVI
Mumbai Central	MMCT

== Infrastructure ==
The Vadodara–Mumbai section is built on 1,676 mm (5 ft 6 in) broad gauge and is electrified with 25 kV AC overhead equipment throughout. Different parts of the corridor have double, triple and quadruple tracks to accommodate intensive passenger and freight operations. The section forms part of Indian Railways' High Density Network and has been upgraded under Mission Raftaar for higher-speed operations. In recent years, additional tracks, signalling improvements and station redevelopment works have been undertaken to increase capacity and improve operational efficiency.

== Kavach safety system ==
The Vadodara–Mumbai section is among the first high-density railway corridors on the Western Railway to be equipped with the indigenous Kavach automatic train protection (ATP) system. In February 2025, Indian Railways commissioned Kavach 4.0 on the Virar–Vadodara section of the Delhi–Mumbai corridor. The commissioning was followed by the deployment of Kavach on the Vadodara–Nagda section, extending the coverage further north. These projects form part of Indian Railways' programme to improve safety and support higher-speed train operations on the Delhi–Mumbai route.

== Operations ==
The Vadodara–Mumbai section forms the southern part of the New Delhi–Mumbai main line and the northern part of the Mumbai–Ahmedabad main line. It carries Rajdhani Express, Vande Bharat Express, Tejas Express, Duronto Express, Mail and Express trains, MEMU services, Mumbai suburban trains and a substantial volume of freight traffic. Owing to its location on the High Density Network, the section is one of the busiest railway corridors on the Western Railway network.

== Major railway stations ==
Station	Code	Division	Railway zone
Vadodara Junction	BRC	Vadodara	Western Railway
Bharuch Junction	BH	Vadodara	Western Railway
Surat	ST	Mumbai Central	Western Railway
Valsad	BL	Mumbai Central	Western Railway
Vapi	VAPI	Mumbai Central	Western Railway
Palghar	PLG	Mumbai Central	Western Railway
Borivali	BVI	Mumbai Central	Western Railway
Mumbai Central	MMCT	Mumbai Central	Western Railway

== Train services ==
The Vadodara–Mumbai section is served by a wide range of passenger services, including Rajdhani Express, Vande Bharat Express, Tejas Express, Duronto Express, Shatabdi Express, Double Decker Express, Mail and Express trains, MEMU services and Mumbai suburban trains. The section also handles a substantial volume of freight traffic connecting northern and western India with major ports and industrial centres in Gujarat and Maharashtra.

== Traffic and importance ==
The Vadodara–Mumbai section is one of the busiest railway corridors on the Western Railway and forms part of the High Density Network (HDN) of Indian Railways. It serves as a common corridor for trains operating on the New Delhi–Mumbai main line and the Mumbai–Ahmedabad main line, handling a large volume of passenger and freight traffic every day. The section provides rail connectivity to major industrial centres, ports, commercial cities and the Mumbai Metropolitan Region, making it one of the most intensively used routes on the Indian Railways network.

The corridor is used by Rajdhani Express, Vande Bharat Express, Tejas Express, Duronto Express, Shatabdi Express, Mail and Express trains, Mumbai suburban services and a substantial volume of freight trains. Owing to its strategic location, the section has been selected for capacity enhancement, signalling modernisation, Kavach deployment and higher-speed operations under Mission Raftaar.

== Rolling stock and traction ==
The Vadodara–Mumbai section is worked entirely by electric traction and is one of the busiest electrified corridors on the Western Railway. Passenger services on the route are operated using WAP-7, WAP-5 and WAP-4 electric locomotives, while freight trains are commonly hauled by WAG-9 and WAG-12 locomotives. The section also accommodates Mumbai suburban EMU services between Virar and Mumbai Central, along with MEMU services on the Gujarat portion of the route.

The route is regularly used by Rajdhani Express, Vande Bharat Express, Tejas Express, Duronto Express, Double Decker Express, Mail and Express trains, making it one of the busiest passenger corridors on the Western Railway network. The corridor also carries heavy freight traffic serving ports, industrial centres and container terminals in Gujarat and Maharashtra.

== Future developments ==
The Vadodara–Mumbai section is being upgraded under Indian Railways' capacity enhancement programme. Ongoing works include station redevelopment, yard remodelling, additional lines on congested stretches, signalling improvements and the expansion of the Kavach automatic train protection system. These projects are intended to improve safety, increase line capacity and support higher-speed train operations on the Delhi–Mumbai corridor.

== Gallery ==
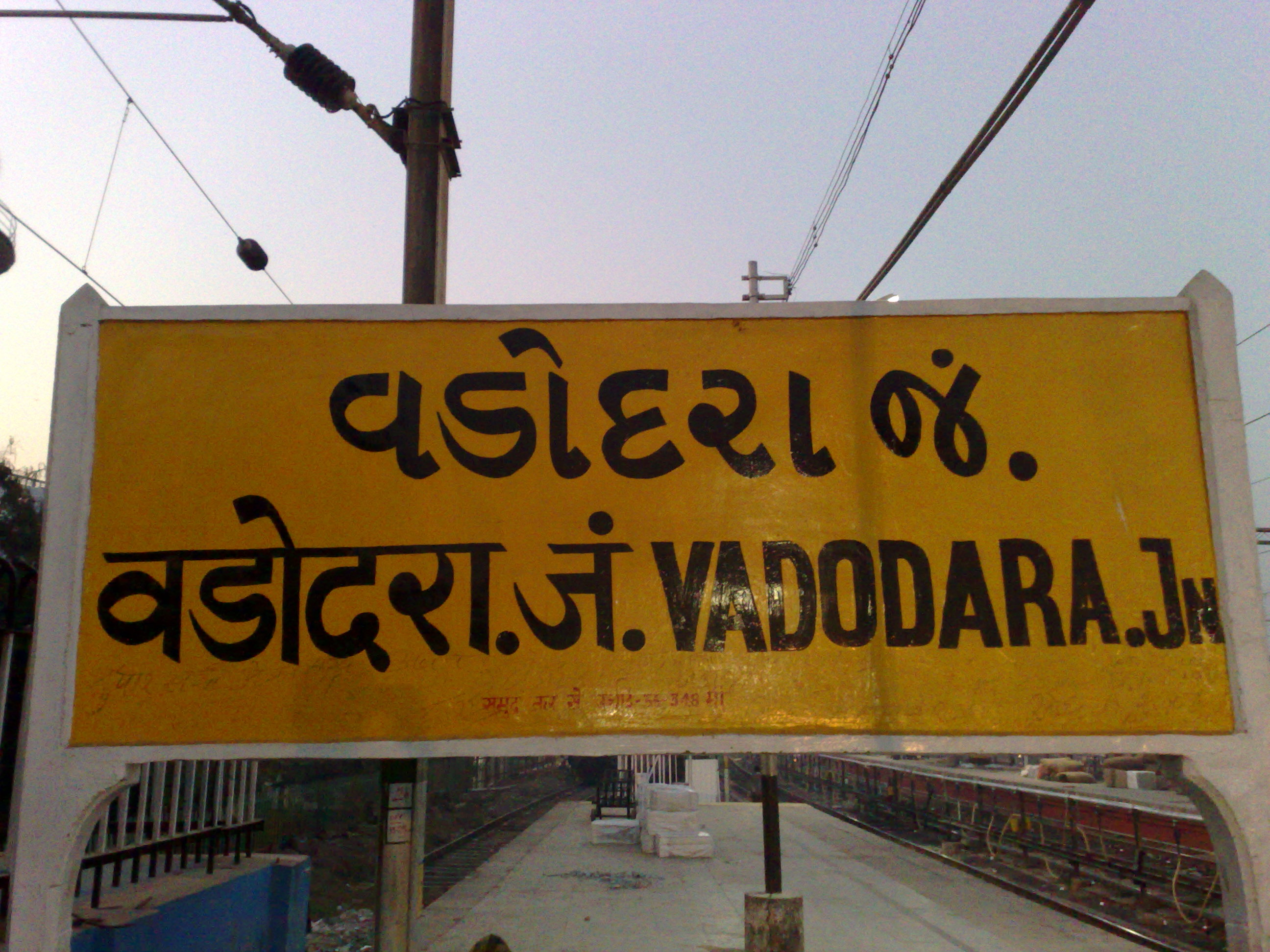
Vadodara Junction

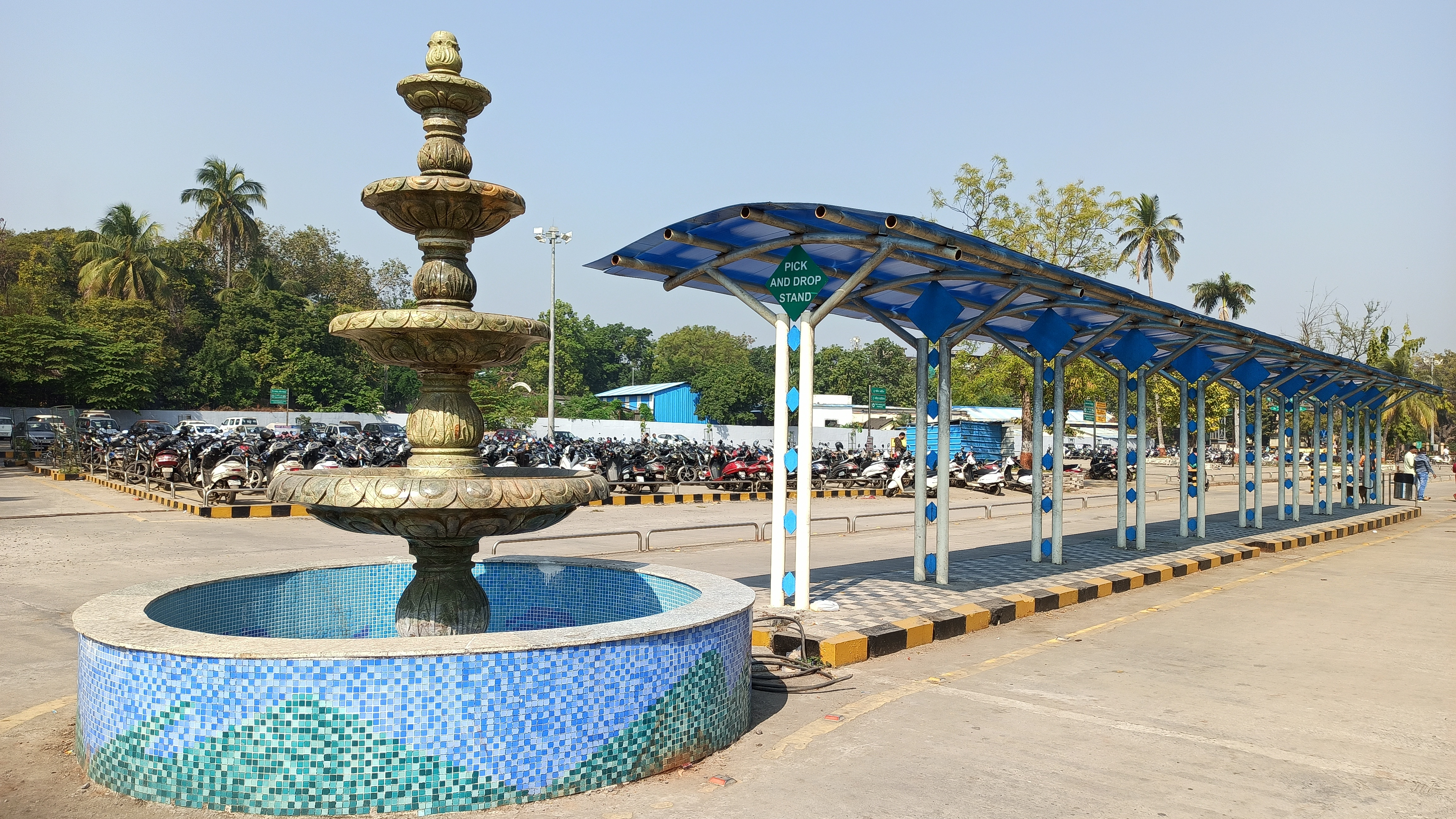
Valsad

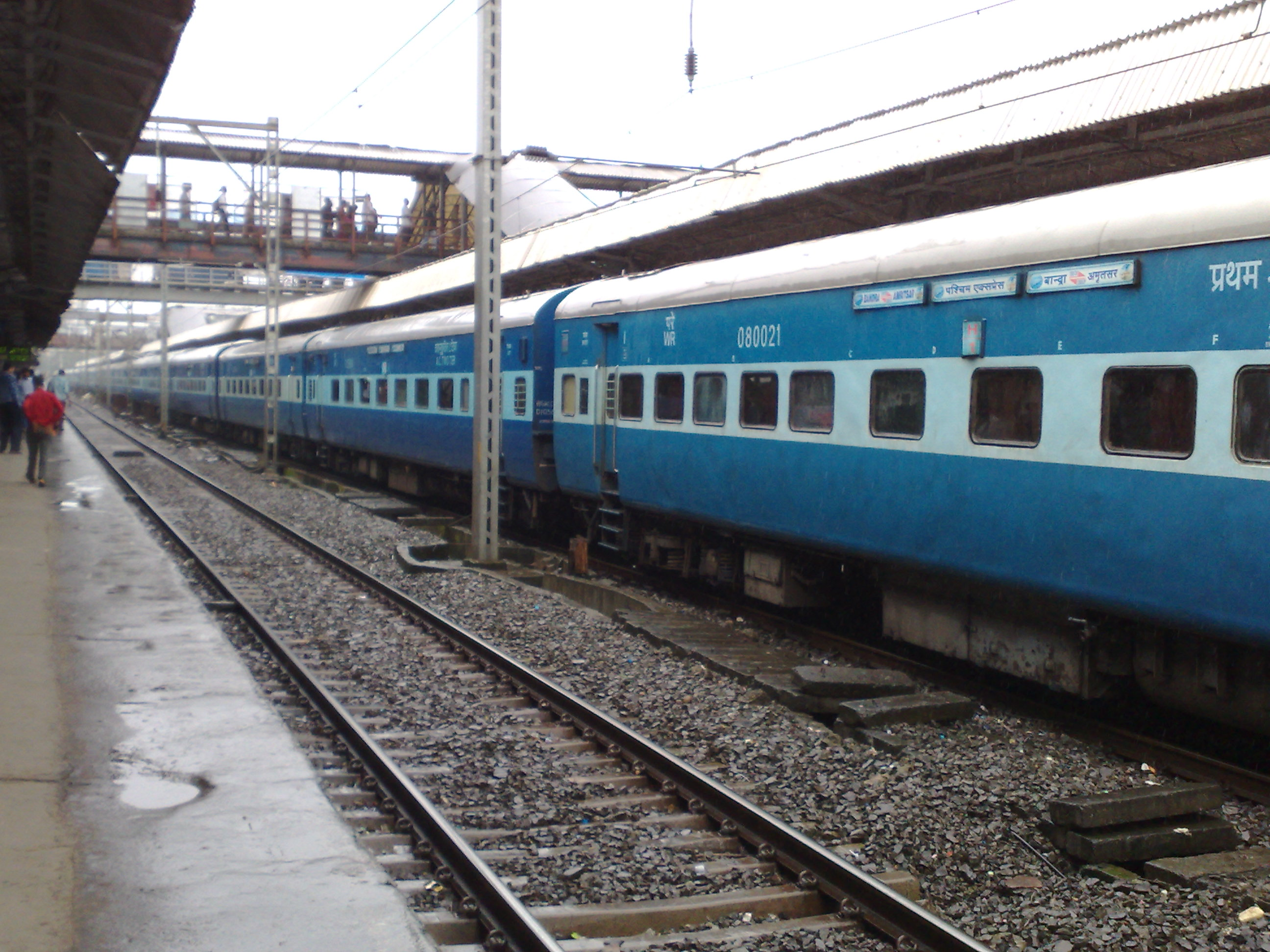
Borivali

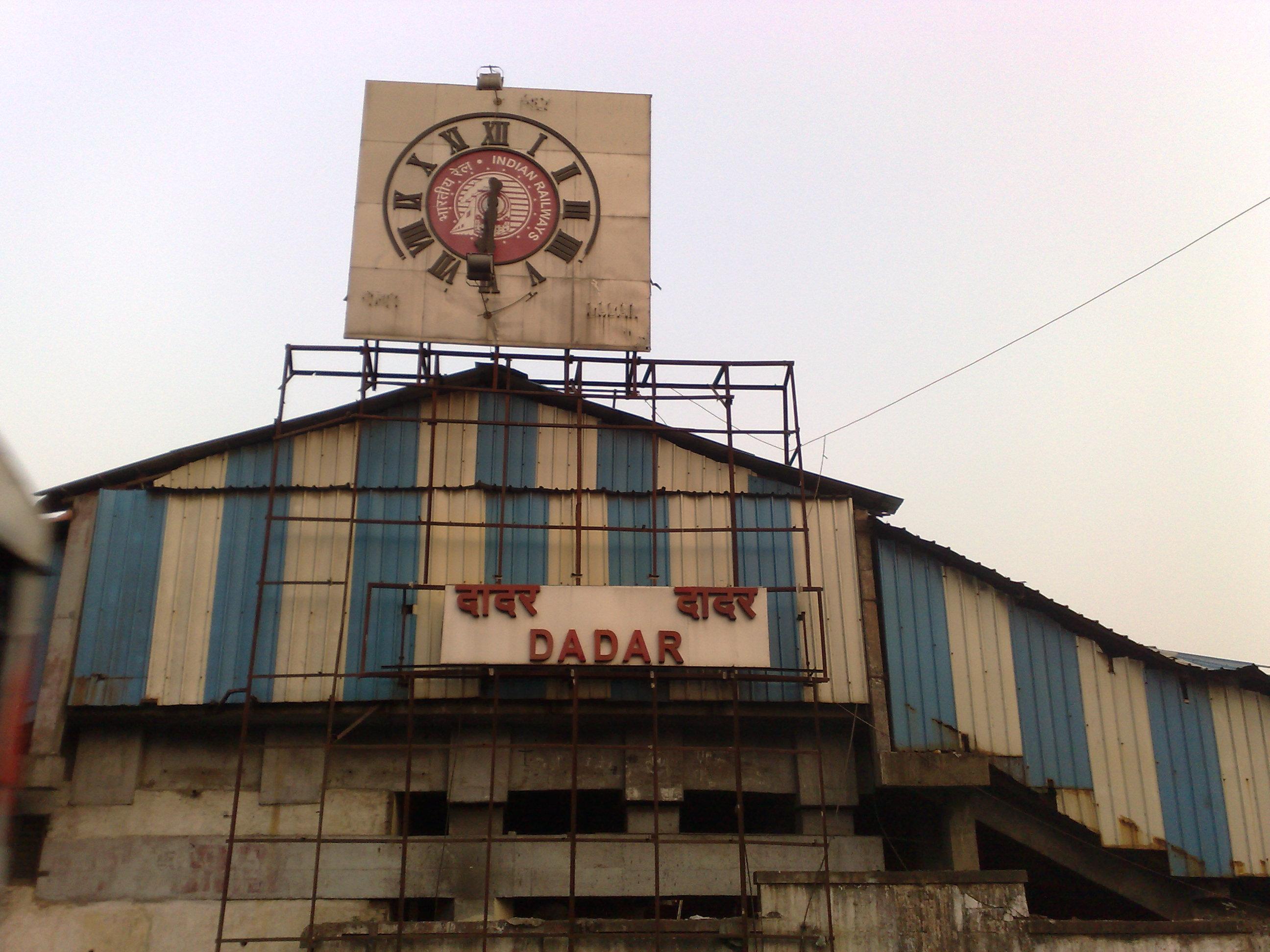
Dadar Western

== Related projects ==
Several railway infrastructure projects are being undertaken along the Vadodara–Mumbai section to improve operational efficiency and passenger amenities. These include the redevelopment of Vadodara Junction, yard remodelling works, signalling upgrades, capacity augmentation, expansion of the Kavach automatic train protection system and higher-speed infrastructure under Mission Raftaar. The section also interfaces with the under-construction Mumbai–Ahmedabad high-speed rail corridor, although both corridors operate on separate alignments.

== Statistics ==
Route statistics
Particular	Details
Route	New Delhi–Mumbai main line Mumbai–Ahmedabad main line
Operator	Western Railway
Owner	Indian Railways
Route length	392 km (244 mi)
States	Gujarat, Maharashtra
Track gauge	1,676 mm (5 ft 6 in) broad gauge
Electrification	25 kV AC OHLE
Track configuration	Double, triple and quadruple
Maximum permissible speed	Up to 160 km/h (99 mph)
High Density Network	Yes
Kavach	Commissioned on major sections of the corridor
