= Mumbai Central–Gandhinagar Capital Vande Bharat Express =

Vande Bharat Express train route in India

Mumbai Central - Gandhinagar Capital Vande Bharat Express

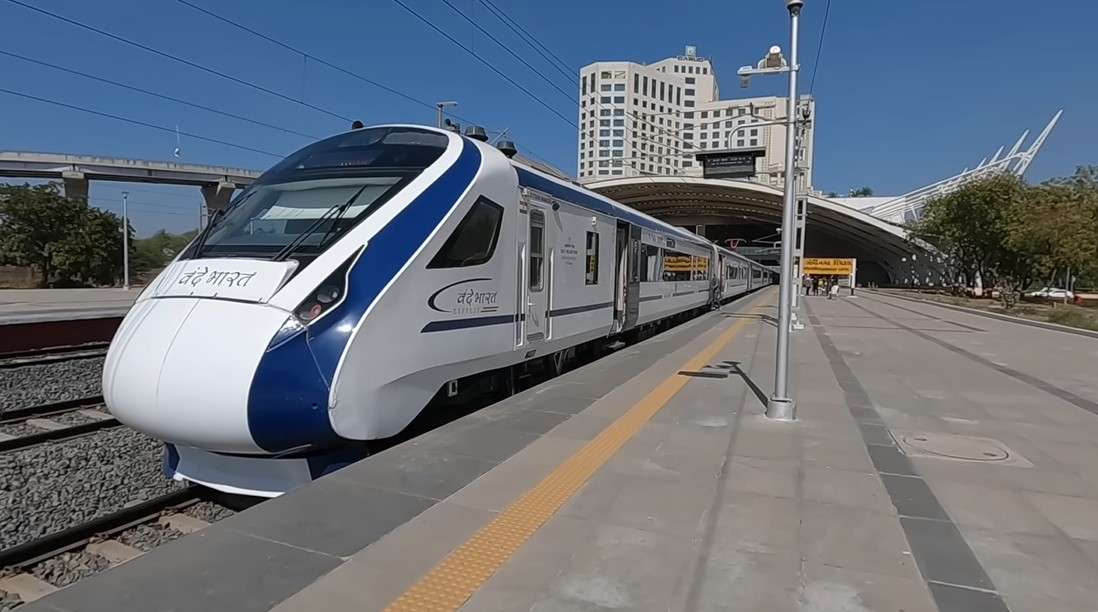
- 3rd VB Express train standing at Gandhinagar Central with Hotel Leela in the background and waiting for departure towards Mumbai Central

Overview
- Service type: Vande Bharat Express
- Locale: Maharashtra and Gujarat
- First service: 30 September 2022 (Inaugural run); 1 October 2022; 4 years ago (Commercial run)
- Current operator: Western Railways (WR)

Route
- Termini: Mumbai Central (MMCT); Gandhinagar Capital (GNC)
- Stops: 8
- Distance travelled: 522 km (324 mi)
- Average journey time: 06 hrs 15 mins
- Service frequency: Six days a week (Note: Except Wednesdays)
- Train number: 20901 / 20902
- Lines used: Mumbai–Ahmedabad main line; Ahmedabad–Gandhinagar Capital line

On-board services
- Classes: AC Chair Car, AC Executive Chair Car
- Seating arrangements: Airline style; Rotatable seats
- Sleeping arrangements: No
- Catering facilities: On-board catering
- Observation facilities: Large windows in all coaches
- Entertainment facilities: On-board WiFi; Infotainment System; Electric outlets; Reading light; Seat Pockets; Bottle Holder; Tray Table
- Baggage facilities: Overhead racks
- Other facilities: Kavach

Technical
- Rolling stock: Vande Bharat 2.0 (Last service: May 10, 2025); Vande Bharat 3.0 (First service: May 11, 2025)
- Track gauge: Indian gauge 1,676 mm (5 ft 6 in) broad gauge
- Electrification: 25 kV 50 Hz AC Overhead line
- Operating speed: 79 km/h (49 mph) (Avg.)
- Average length: 480 metres (1,570 ft) (20 coaches)
- Track owner: Indian Railways
- Rake maintenance: Mumbai Central (MMCT)
Route map

The 20901/20902 Mumbai Central - Gandhinagar Capital Vande Bharat Express is India's 3rd Vande Bharat Express train, connecting the states of Maharashtra and Gujarat.

== Overview ==
This train is operated by Indian Railways, connecting Mumbai Central, Borivali, Vapi, Valsad, Navsari, Surat, Vadodara Jn, Anand Jn, Ahmedabad Jn and Gandhinagar Capital. It is currently operated with train numbers 20901/20902 on 6 days a week basis.

== Rakes ==
It was the first 2nd Generation Vande Bharat Express train and was designed and manufactured by the Integral Coach Factory (ICF) under the leadership of Sudhanshu Mani at Perambur, Chennai under the Make in India initiative.

=== Coach Augmentation ===
The 20901/20902 Mumbai Central - Gandhinagar Capital Vande Bharat Express was permanently augmented with 04 more coaches and is currently running with 20-car Vande Bharat 3.0 trainset W.E.F. 11 May 2025 in order to meet the extra rush and passenger demands. By doing so, this express train becomes the longest VB Express train under Western Railways (WR).

== Service ==
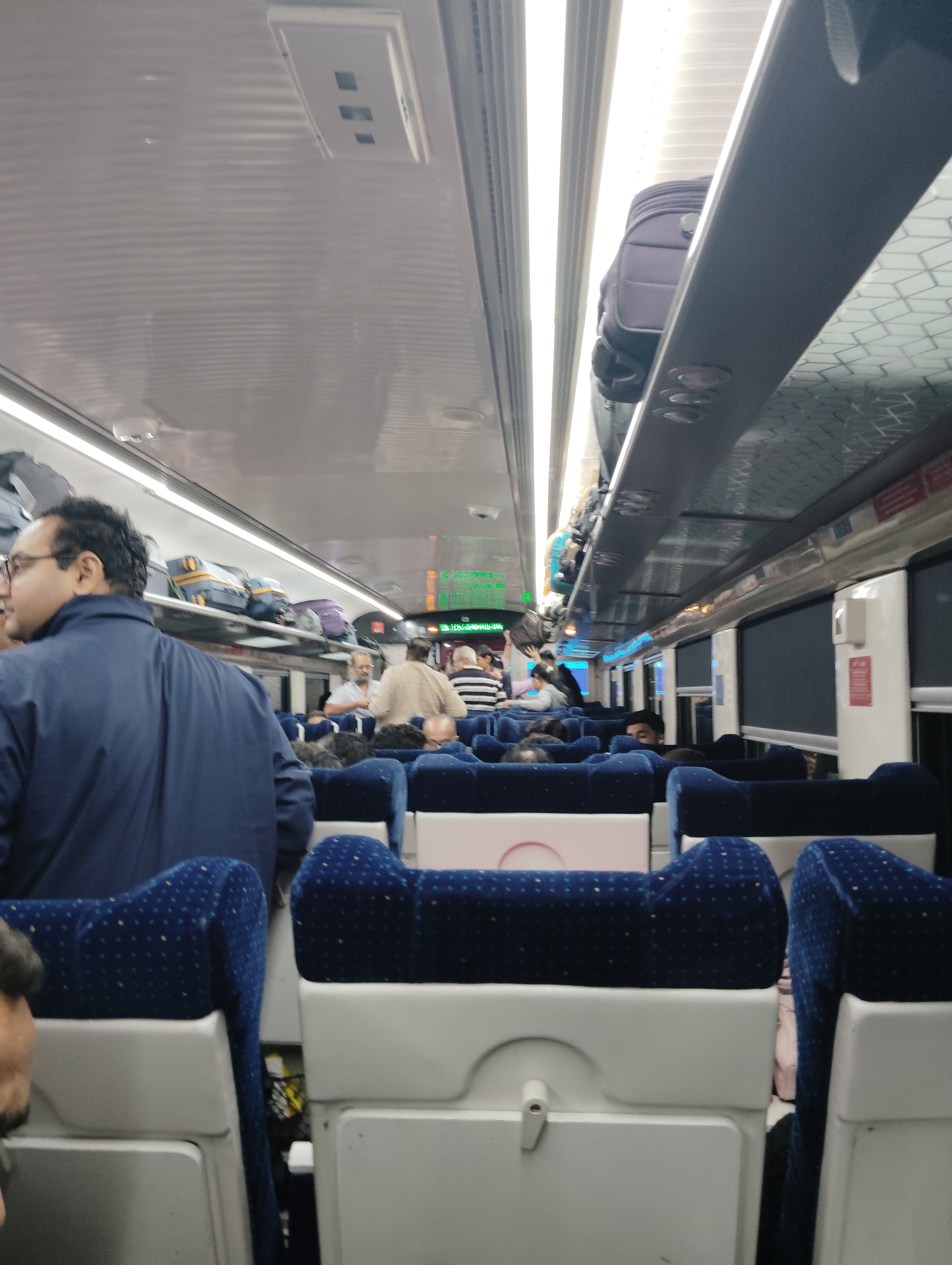
Interior of the Mumbai Central–Gandhinagar Capital Vande Bharat Express

The 20901/20902 Mumbai Ctrl - Gandhinagar Capital Vande Bharat Express operates six days a week except Wednesdays, covering a distance of 522 km (324 mi) in a travel time of 6 hours with an average speed of 81 km/h (50 mph). The service has 6 intermediate stops. The Maximum Permissible Speed is 130 km/h (81 mph).

== Incidents ==
A week after the inauguration of the 3rd Vande Bharat Express train, this train rammed into cattle near Atul station in Gujarat, on 29 October morning, causing 15-20 delay in reaching its destination. No casualties were involved in this incident.

== See also ==
- Vande Bharat Express
- Tejas Express
- Gatimaan Express
- Mumbai Central railway station
- Gandhinagar Capital railway station
