= Bandra Terminus–Hazrat Nizamuddin Garib Rath Express =

Train in India

Bandra Terminus – Hazrat Nizamuddin Garib Rath Express
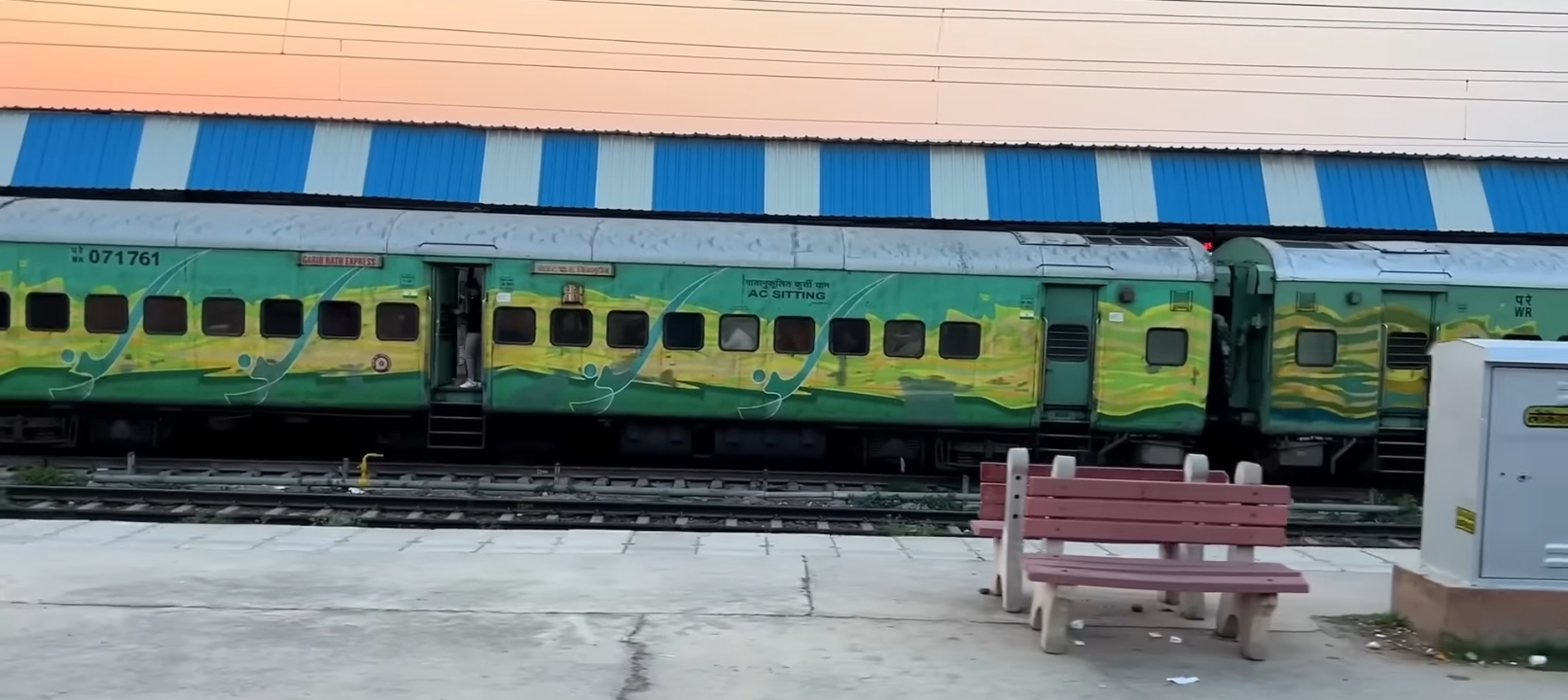
- Bandra Terminus – Hazrat Nizamuddin Garib Rath Express At Mathura Junction railway station

Overview
- Service type: Garib Rath Express
- First service: 22 February 2007; 19 years ago
- Current operator: Western Railway

Route
- Termini: Bandra Terminus (BDTS); Hazrat Nizamuddin (NZM)
- Stops: 6
- Distance travelled: 1,367 km (849 mi)
- Average journey time: 16 hours 45 minutes
- Service frequency: Tri-weekly
- Train number: 12909 / 12910

On-board services
- Classes: AC 3 Tier Economy, AC Chair Car
- Seating arrangements: Yes
- Sleeping arrangements: Yes
- Catering facilities: On-board catering, E-catering
- Observation facilities: Large windows
- Baggage facilities: Available
- Other facilities: Below the seats

Technical
- Rolling stock: LHB coach
- Track gauge: 1,676 mm (5 ft 6 in)
- Operating speed: 130 km/h (81 mph) maximum, 82 km/h (51 mph) average including halts.

The 12909 / 12910 Bandra Terminus–Hazrat Nizamuddin Garib Rath Express is a Superfast Express train of the Garib Rath Express category belonging to Indian Railways –Western Railway zone that runs between Bandra Terminus and Hazrat Nizamuddin in India . It is the fastest Garib Rath Express in Indian Railways .

It operates as train number 12909 from Bandra Terminus to Hazrat Nizamuddin and as train number 12910 in the reverse direction, serving the states of Maharashtra, Gujarat, Madhya Pradesh, Rajasthan & Delhi.

== Coaches ==
The 12909 / 10 Bandra Terminus–Hazrat Nizamuddin Garib Rath Express was having 15 AC 3 tier & 4 AC Chair Car coaches. There is 1 EOG each at both the ends.Now it has 20 AC 3 tier coaches. Earlier was mixed ICF rakes of Yuva Express, Garib Rath Express and Utkrisht

== Service ==
12909 Bandra Terminus–Hazrat Nizamuddin Garib Rath Express covers the distance of 1367 kilometres in 16 hours 45 mins (82 km/h) and in 16 hours 45 mins as 12910 Hazrat Nizamuddin–Bandra Terminus Garib Rath Express (82 km/h) making it the 2nd fastest train on the Mumbai–Delhi sector, but fastest Garib Rath in India.

As the average speed of the train is above 82 km/h, as per Indian Railways rules, its fare includes a Superfast surcharge.

== Route and halts ==
The important halts of the train are:

- Bandra Terminus
- Borivali
- Surat
- Vadodara Junction
- Ratlam Junction
- Kota Junction
- Mathura Junction
- Hazrat Nizamuddin

== Traction ==
It is now regularly hauled by a Vadodara Loco Shed-based WAP-7 and WAP-5 electric locomotive on its entire journey.

== Timings ==
12909 Bandra Terminus–Hazrat Nizamuddin Garib Rath Express leaves Bandra Terminus every Tuesday, Thursday & Saturday at 17:30 PM IST and reaches Hazrat Nizamuddin at 10:15 AM IST the next day.

The 12910 Hazrat Nizamuddin–Bandra Terminus Garib Rath Express leaves Hazrat Nizamuddin every Wednesday, Friday & Sunday at 16:30 PM IST and reaches Bandra Terminus at 09:15 AM IST the next day.

== Gallery ==
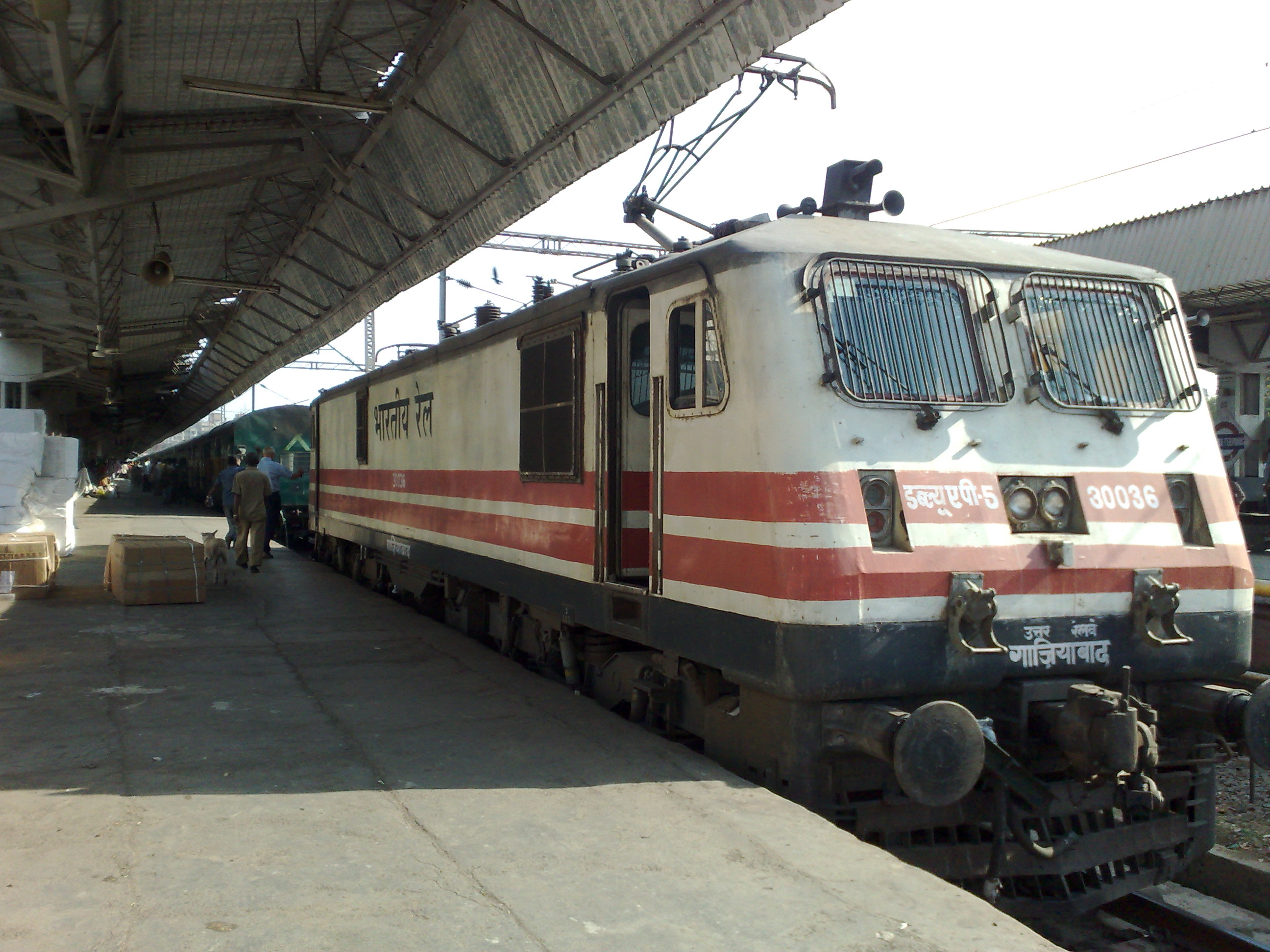
Ghaziabad-based WAP-5 getting ready to haul the Garib Rath Express

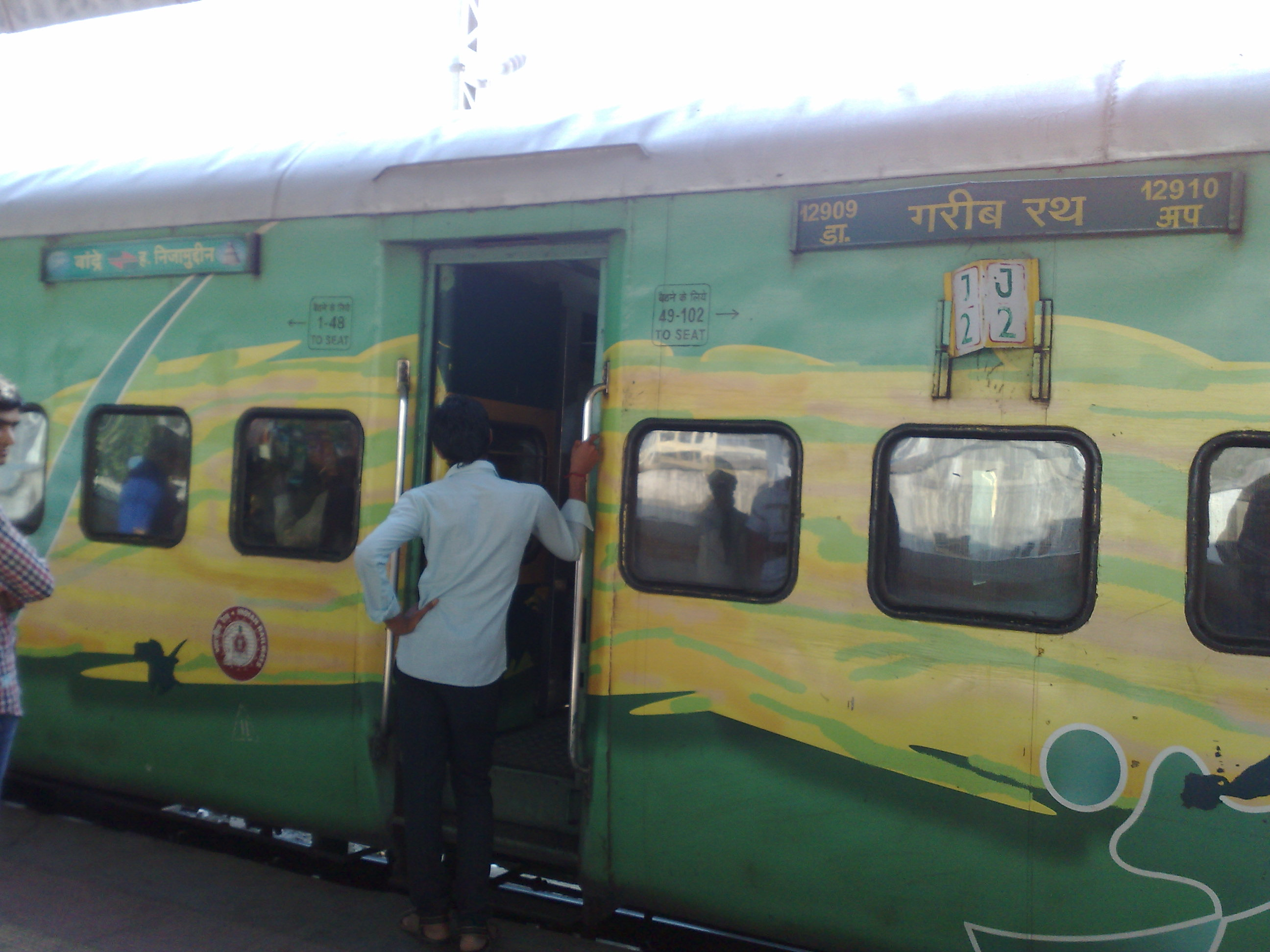
12909 Garib Rath Express – AC Chair Car coach

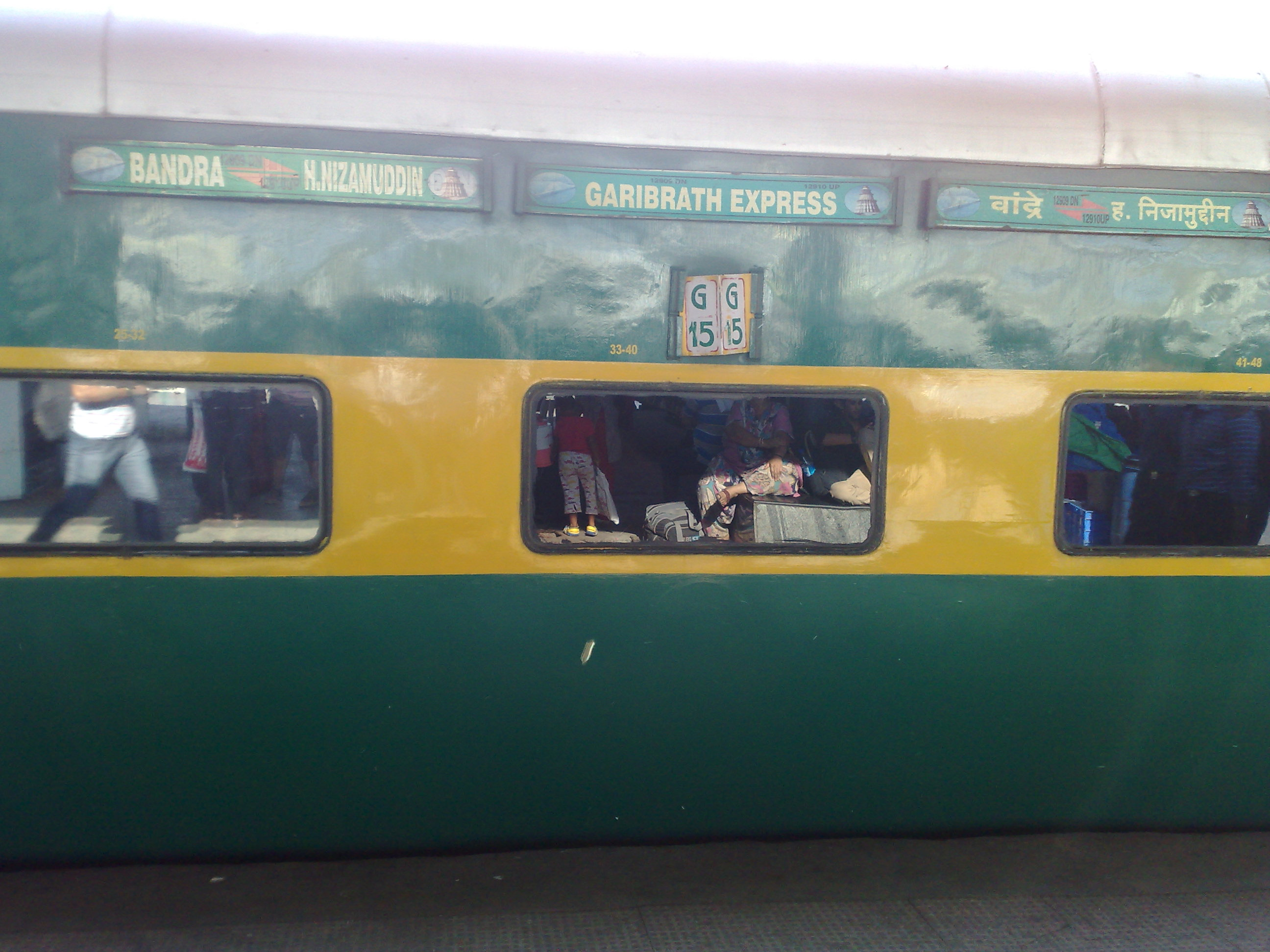
12909 Garib Rath Express – AC 3 tier coach

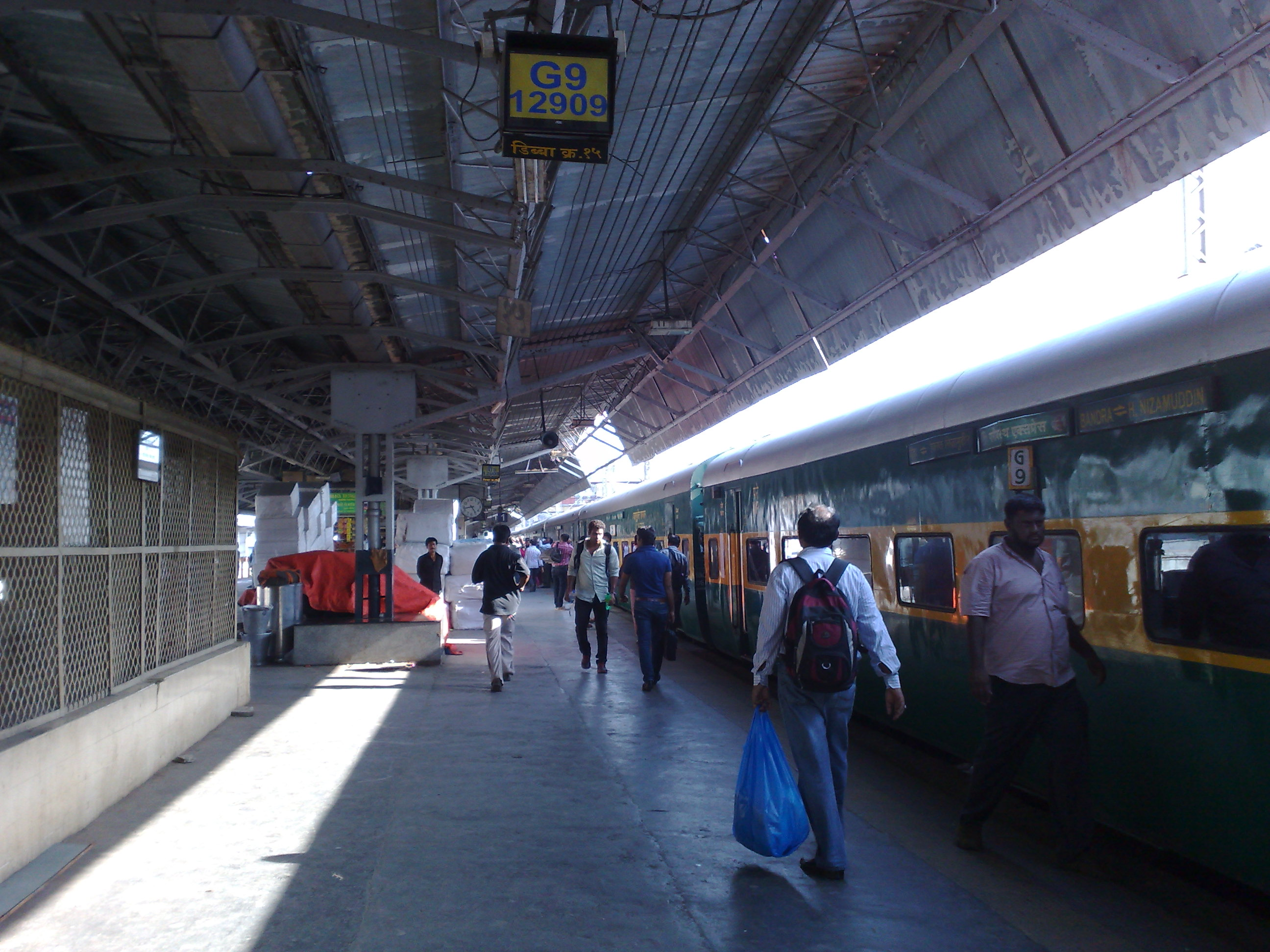
12909 Garib Rath Express at Bandra Terminus

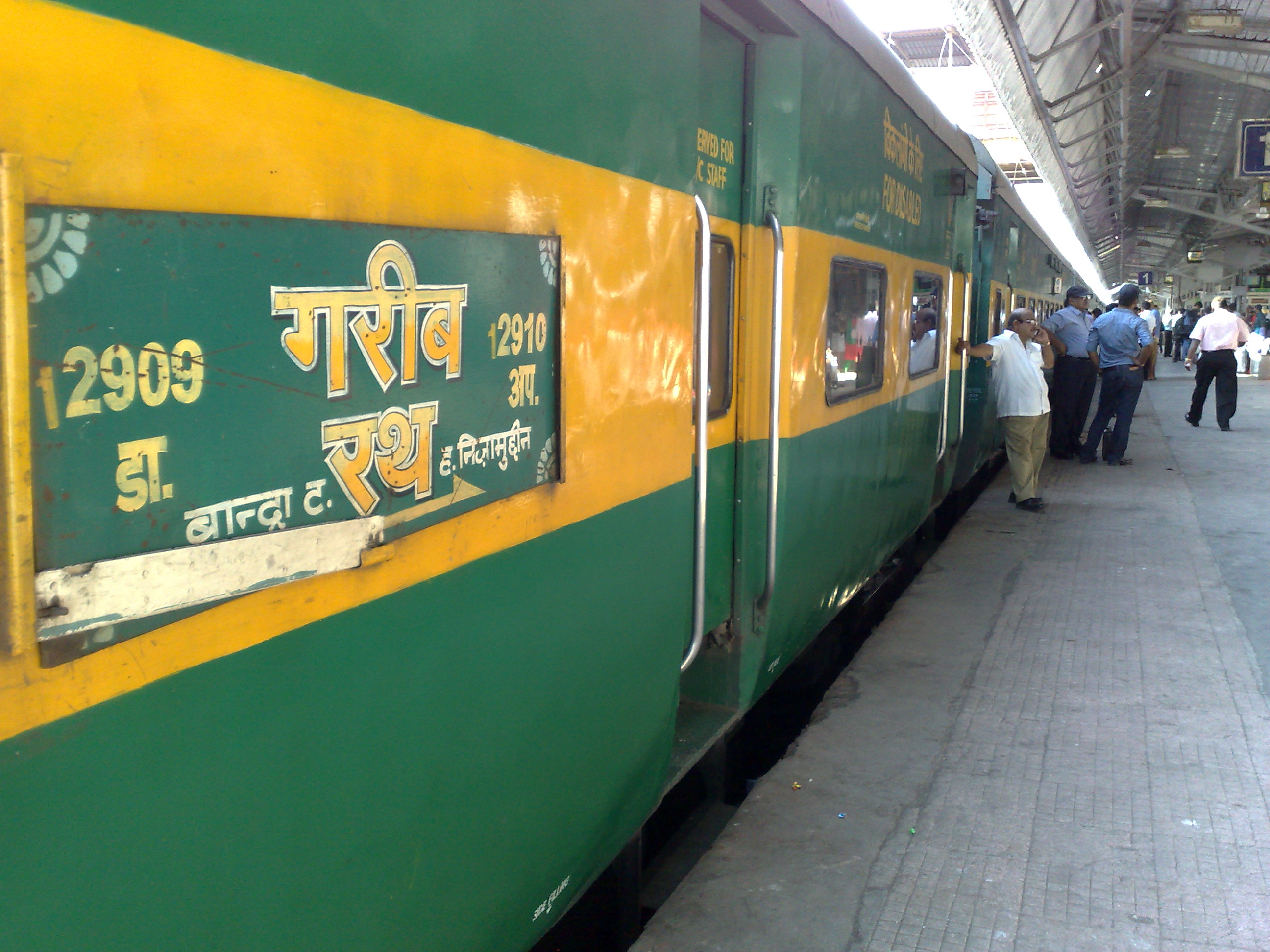
12909 Garib Rath Express – EOG car

== Sister trains ==
- August Kranti Rajdhani Express
- Bandra Terminus–Hazrat Nizamuddin AC Superfast Express
- Bandra Terminus–Hazrat Nizamuddin Yuva Express
- Delhi Sarai Rohilla–Bandra Terminus Garib Rath Express
- Lokmanya Tilak Terminus–Hazrat Nizamuddin AC Express
- Maharashtra Sampark Kranti Express
- Mumbai–New Delhi Duronto Express
- Mumbai Rajdhani Express
- Mumbai CSMT–Hazrat Nizamuddin Rajdhani Express
