= Lokmanya Tilak Terminus–Hazrat Nizamuddin AC Express =

Train in India

Overview
- Service type: AC Superfast Express
- First service: Inaugural on 30 October 2013; 12 years ago
- Last service: Permanently cancelled from 5 November 2021; 4 years ago
- Current operator: Central Railway

Route
- Termini: Mumbai LTT (LTT); Hazrat Nizamuddin (NZM)
- Stops: 8
- Distance travelled: 1,518 km (943 mi)
- Average journey time: 20 hours 10 minutes
- Service frequency: Weekly
- Train number: 22109 / 22110

On-board services
- Classes: AC first, AC 2 tier, AC 3 tier
- Seating arrangements: Yes
- Sleeping arrangements: Yes
- Catering facilities: Available
- Observation facilities: Large windows
- Baggage facilities: Available
- Other facilities: Pantry car with Standard Menu on Indian Railways.

Technical
- Rolling stock: LHB coach
- Track gauge: 1,676 mm (5 ft 6 in)
- Operating speed: 130 km/h (81 mph) maximum, 75 km/h (47 mph) average including halts.

The 22109 / 22110 Lokmanya Tilak Terminus–Hazrat Nizamuddin AC Express was an AC Superfast Express train belonging to Indian Railways – Central Railway zone that ran between Lokmanya Tilak Terminus and Hazrat Nizamuddin in India.

It operated as train number 22109 from Lokmanya Tilak Terminus-Hazrat Nizamuddin and as train number 22110 in the reverse direction, serving the states of Maharashtra, Madhya Pradesh, Uttar Pradesh and Delhi.

== Rolling stock ==
The 22109 / 10 Lokmanya Tilak Terminus–Hazrat Nizamuddin AC Express had 1 AC First Class, 4 AC 2 tier, 12 AC 3 tier and 2 End on Generator coaches. In addition, it carried a pantry car. All the coaches were modern high-speed LHB coach that are manufactured in Rail Coach Factory, Kapurthala and Modern Coach Factory, Raebareli.

As is customary with most train services in India, coach composition may be amended at the discretion of Indian Railways depending on demand.

== Service ==
The 22109 Lokmanya Tilak Terminus–Hazrat Nizamuddin AC Express covered the distance of 1521 kilometres in 19 hours 50 mins (76.69 km/h) and in 20 hours 00 mins as 22110 Hazrat Nizamuddin–Lokmanya Tilak Terminus AC Express (76.05 km/h).

As the average speed of the train was above 55 km/h (34 mph), as per Indian Railways rules, its fare included a Superfast surcharge.

== Route ==
The 22109 / 10 Lokmanya Tilak Terminus–Hazrat Nizamuddin AC Express ran from Lokmanya Tilak Terminus via

- Kalyan Junction
- Nasik Road
- Bhusaval Junction
- Bhopal Junction
- Jhansi Junction
- Gwalior Junction
- Agra Cantonment

to Hazrat Nizamuddin.

== Traction ==
As the entire route is fully electrified, Bhusawal or Itarsi-based WAP-4's or Ajni-based WAP-7s were the traditional locomotives for this train & power the train for its entire journey. It also was occasionally hauled by Bhusaval/Itarsi WAM-4, Ghaziabad/Royapuram/Lallaguda-based WAP-7 and once by a Ghaziabad WAP-5.

== Timings ==
- 22109 Lokmanya Tilak Terminus–Hazrat Nizamuddin AC Express used to leave Lokmanya Tilak Terminus every Tuesday at 14:30 hrs IST and reached Hazrat Nizamuddin at 10:20 hrs IST the next day.
- 22110 Hazrat Nizamuddin–Lokmanya Tilak Terminus AC Express used to leave Hazrat Nizamuddin every Wednesday at 15:50 hrs IST and reached Lokmanya Tilak Terminus at 11:50 hrs IST the next day.

== Sister trains ==
- August Kranti Rajdhani Express
- Bandra Terminus–Hazrat Nizamuddin AC Superfast Express
- Bandra Terminus–Hazrat Nizamuddin Garib Rath Express
- Bandra Terminus–Hazrat Nizamuddin Yuva Express
- Delhi Sarai Rohilla–Bandra Terminus Garib Rath Express
- Maharashtra Sampark Kranti Express
- Mumbai–New Delhi Duronto Express
- Mumbai Rajdhani Express
- Mumbai CSMT–Hazrat Nizamuddin Rajdhani Express
