= Mumbai Central–New Delhi Duronto Express =

Train in India

Mumbai Central - Hazrat Nizamuddin Duronto Express
- MMCT-NZM Duronto Express train board.

Overview
- Service type: Duronto Express
- Locale: Maharashtra, Gujarat, Madhya Pradesh, Rajasthan, Uttar Pradesh, Haryana & Delhi
- First service: 23 March 2012; 14 years ago
- Current operator: Western Railway

Route
- Termini: Mumbai Central (MMCT); Hazrat Nizamuddin (NZM)
- Distance travelled: 1,378 km (856 mi)
- Average journey time: 16 hours 33 minutes; as 22209, 17 hrs 30 mins as 22210
- Service frequency: Bi-weekly.
- Train number: 22209 / 22210

On-board services
- Classes: AC First Class, AC 2 tier, AC 3 tier, AC 3 Tier Economy
- Sleeping arrangements: Yes
- Catering facilities: On-board Pantry Car
- Baggage facilities: Underhead Space

Technical
- Rolling stock: LHB coach
- Track gauge: Broad Gauge
- Electrification: Yes, 25 kV at 50 Hz
- Operating speed: 130 km/h (81 mph) maximum, 82 km/h (51 mph) average including halts.

The 22209 / 22210 Mumbai Central – Hazrat Nizamuddin Durunto Express, is a Duronto Express Train between stations Mumbai Central and Hazrat Nizamuddin of New Delhi. Operated by Western Railways (WR), Mumbai Division, it is currently the fastest among the Duronto series of express trains at an average speed of 83km/h.

Rake sharing with = 12227/28 Mumbai Central Indore Jn BG Duronto Express and 12239/40 Mumbai Central Hisar Duronto Express.

The maiden run of the train was on 18 March 2012, as 02209 from Mumbai Central to New Delhi and was flagged off by the Mayor of Mumbai, Sunil Prabhu.

22210 Mumbai Duronto used to arrive Mumbai Central at 17:00 hrs initially but changes were made and the arrival time at Mumbai was made 45 mins earlier i.e. at 16:15 hrs. Now it is again changed by 25 mins earlier and reaches Mumbai at 15:50 hrs. Similarly, the down train used to arrive at New Delhi at 16:55 hrs, 10–20 mins early on average and then it was changed to arrive at New Delhi at 16:30 hrs. Now, after changing its terminal to Hazrat Nizamuddin, it reaches at 15:50 hrs

== Route, halts and speed ==
Initially, like other Duronto Express trains, 22209/10 did not make any commercial halts, but currently it stops at the following stations:

- Mumbai Central
- Vadodara Junction
- Ratlam Junction
- Kota Junction
- New Delhi

After the extension of Sealdah–New Delhi Duronto up to Bikaner, this train is currently the fastest Duronto Express in Indian Railways.

22210 Mumbai Duronto used to arrive Mumbai Central at 17:00 hrs initially but changes were made and the arrival time at Mumbai was made 45 mins earlier i.e. at 16:15 hrs. Now it is again changed by 25 mins earlier and reaches Mumbai at 15:50 hrs. Similarly, the down train used to arrive at New Delhi at 16:55 hrs, 10–20 mins early on average and then it was changed to arrive at New Delhi at 16:30 hrs. Now, after changing its terminal to Hazrat Nizamuddin, it reaches at 15:50 hrs

== Coach composition ==
The rolling stock in this train consists of LHB coaches manufactured in India. While they arrive with the Rajdhani's distinctive red livery, Duronto Express' coaches are pasted with the Duronto vinyl or wallpaper. Known as Maa Mati Manush, the livery was designed by the former Minister of Railways Mamta Banerjee, who led the creation of Duronto series of express trains.

22209/10 consists of four Third AC Economy (3E), 6 Third AC (3A), 3 Second AC (2A), 1 pantry, 1 First AC (1A), 1 Seating cum Luggage Rake, and 1 Generator car luggage car guard van, hence, a total of 17 coaches.

Rake composition

| Loco | 1 | 2 | 3 | 4 | 5 | 6 | 7 | 8 | 9 | 10 | 11 | 12 | 13 | 14 | 15 | 16 | 17 |
|---|---|---|---|---|---|---|---|---|---|---|---|---|---|---|---|---|---|
| | EOG | M1 | M2 | M3 | M4 | B1 | B2 | B3 | B4 | B5 | B6 | A1 | A2 | A3 | PC | H1 | DL1 |

== Gallery ==
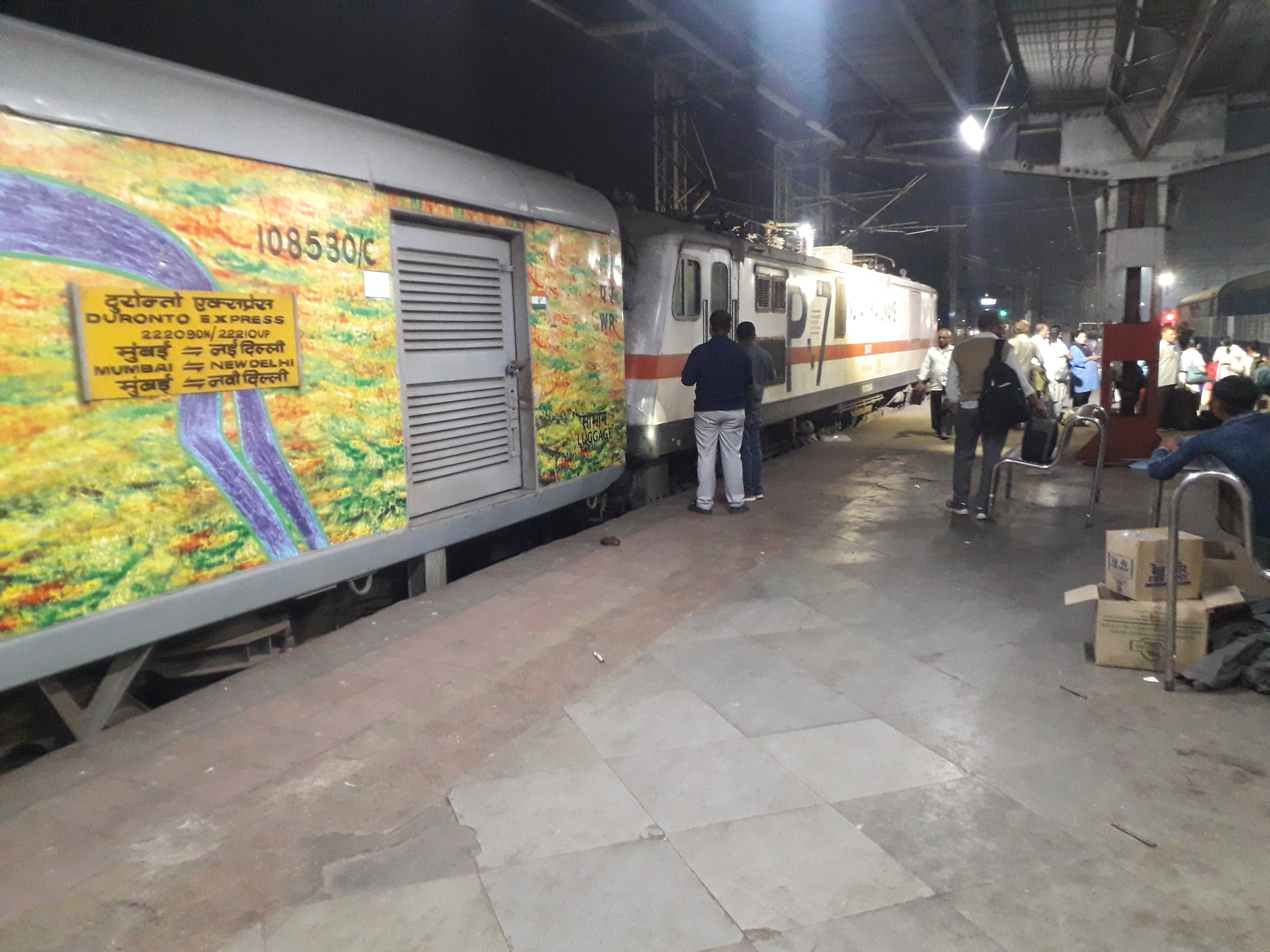
22209 Mumbai–New Delhi Duronto Express with HOG-equipped Vadodara loco shed-based WAP-7

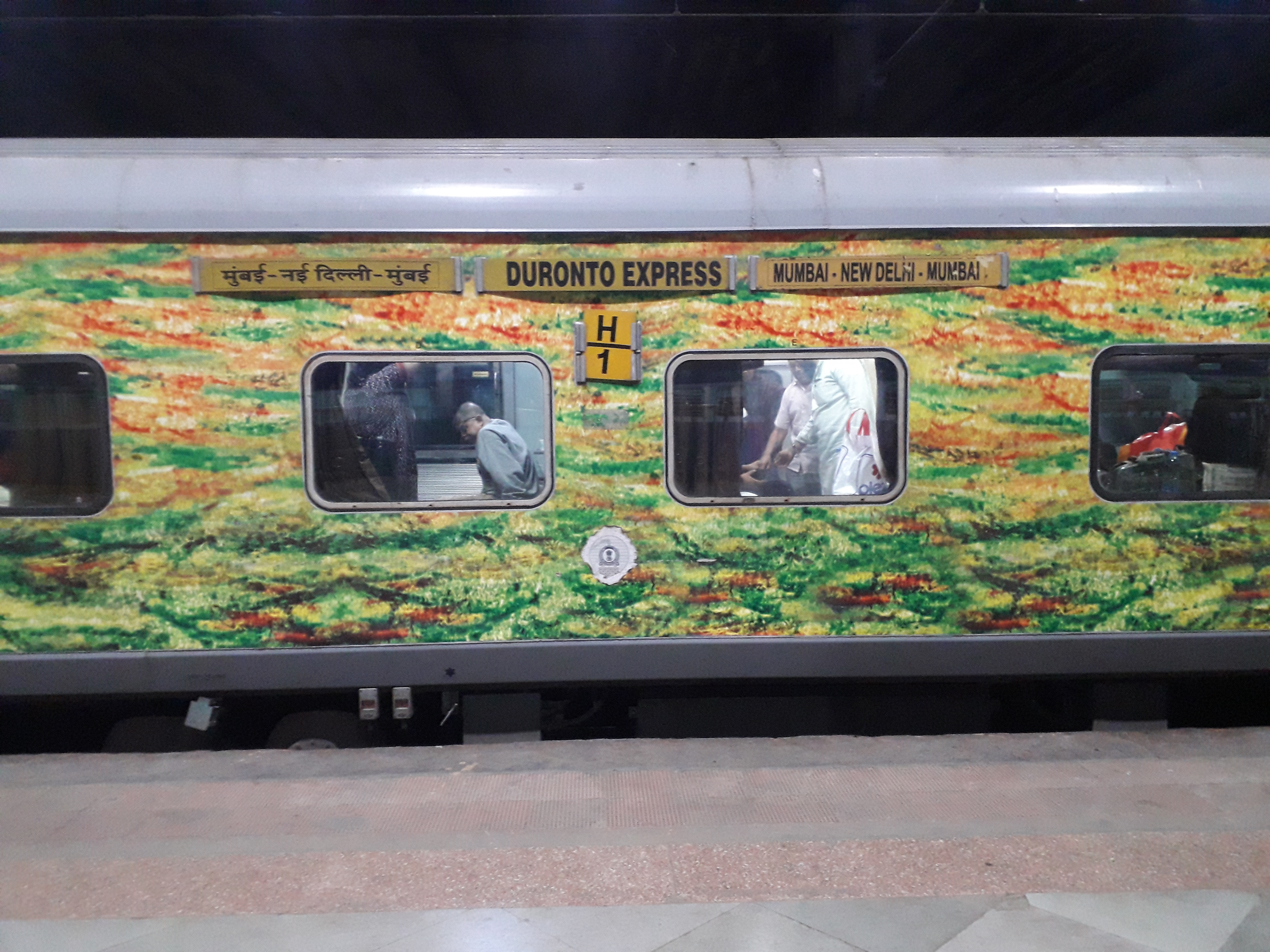
22209 Mumbai–New Delhi Duronto Express – AC 1st Class coach

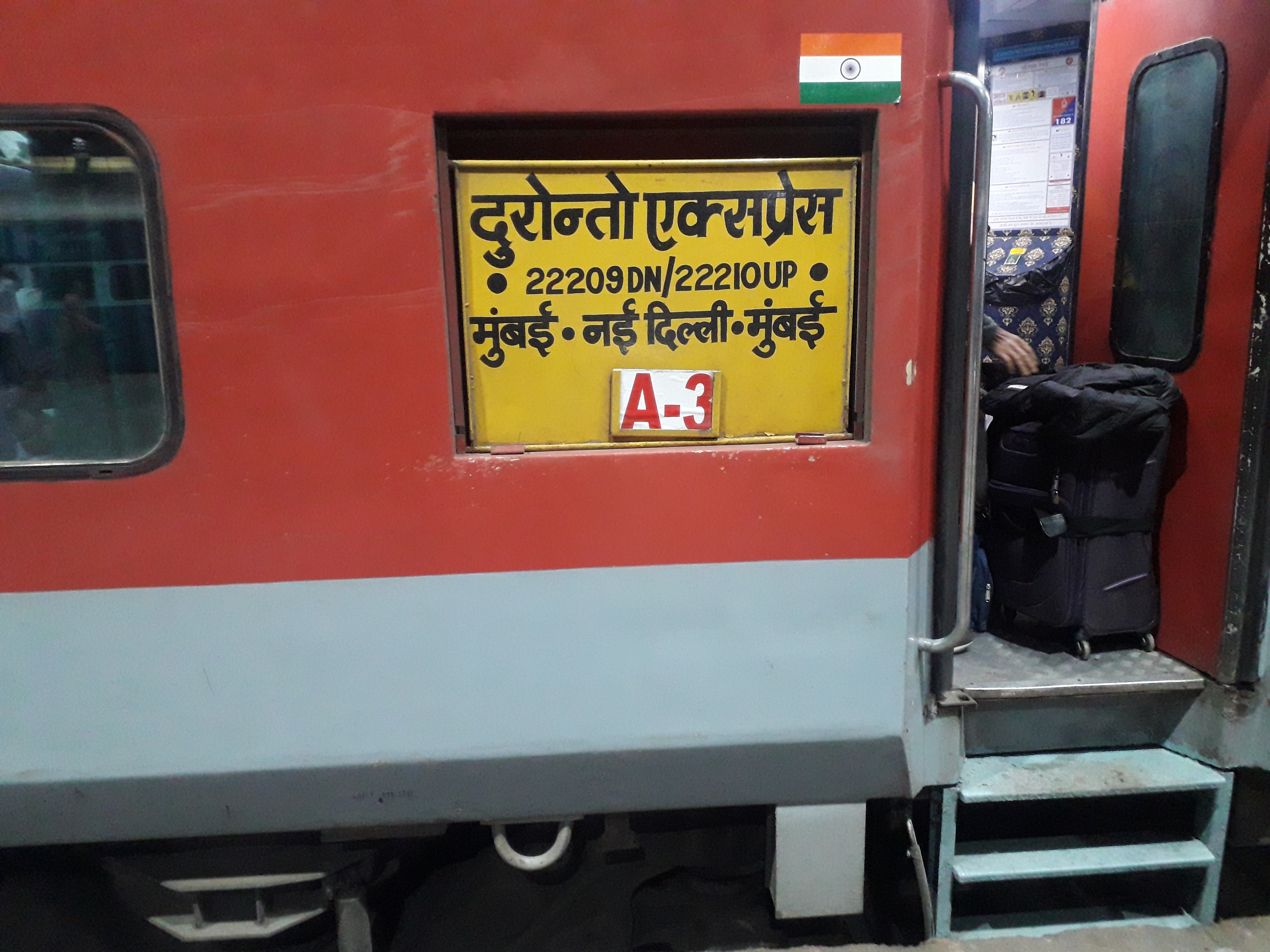
22209 Mumbai–New Delhi Duronto Express – AC 2 tier coach

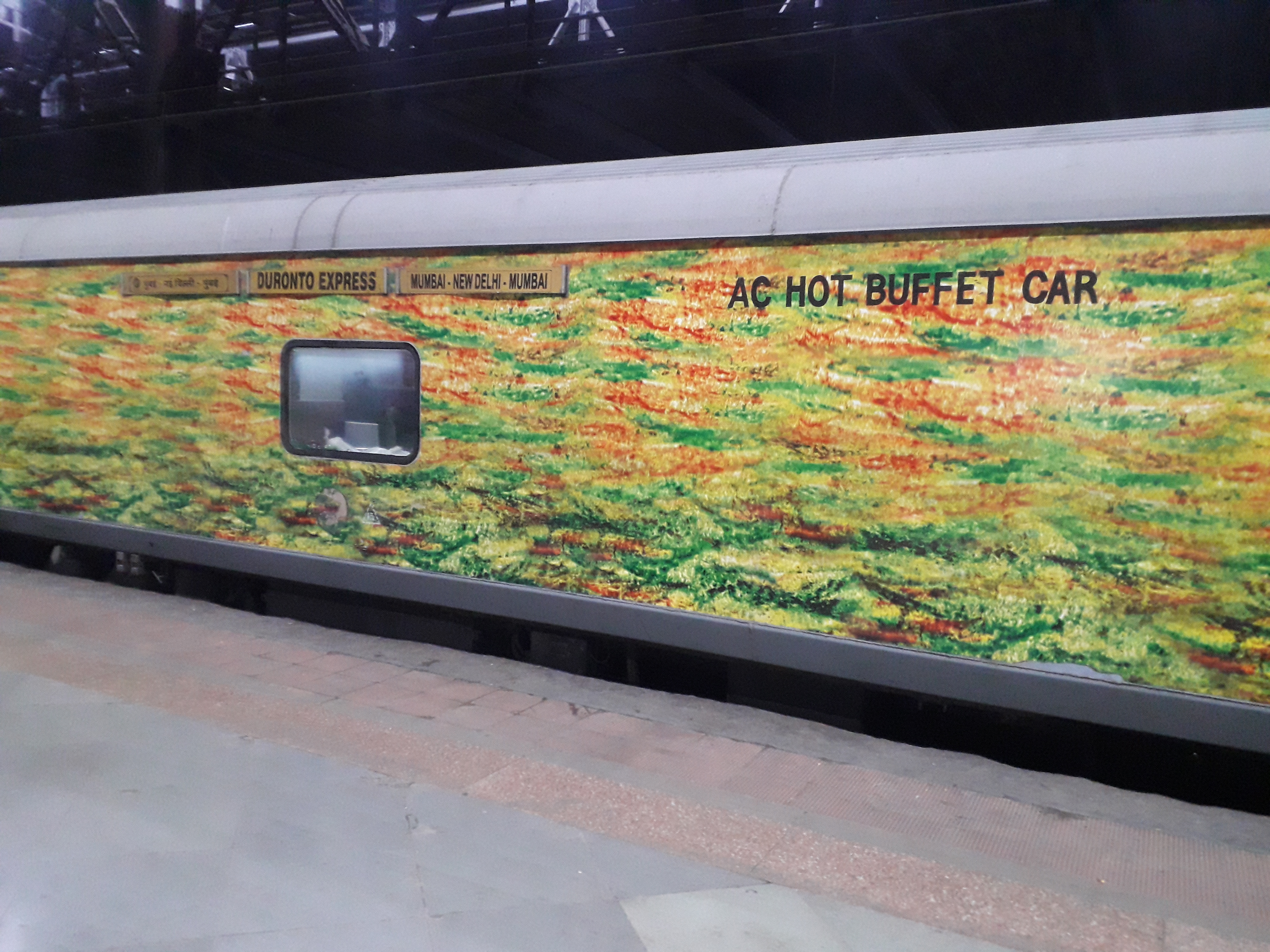
22209 Mumbai–New Delhi Duronto Express – Pantry coach

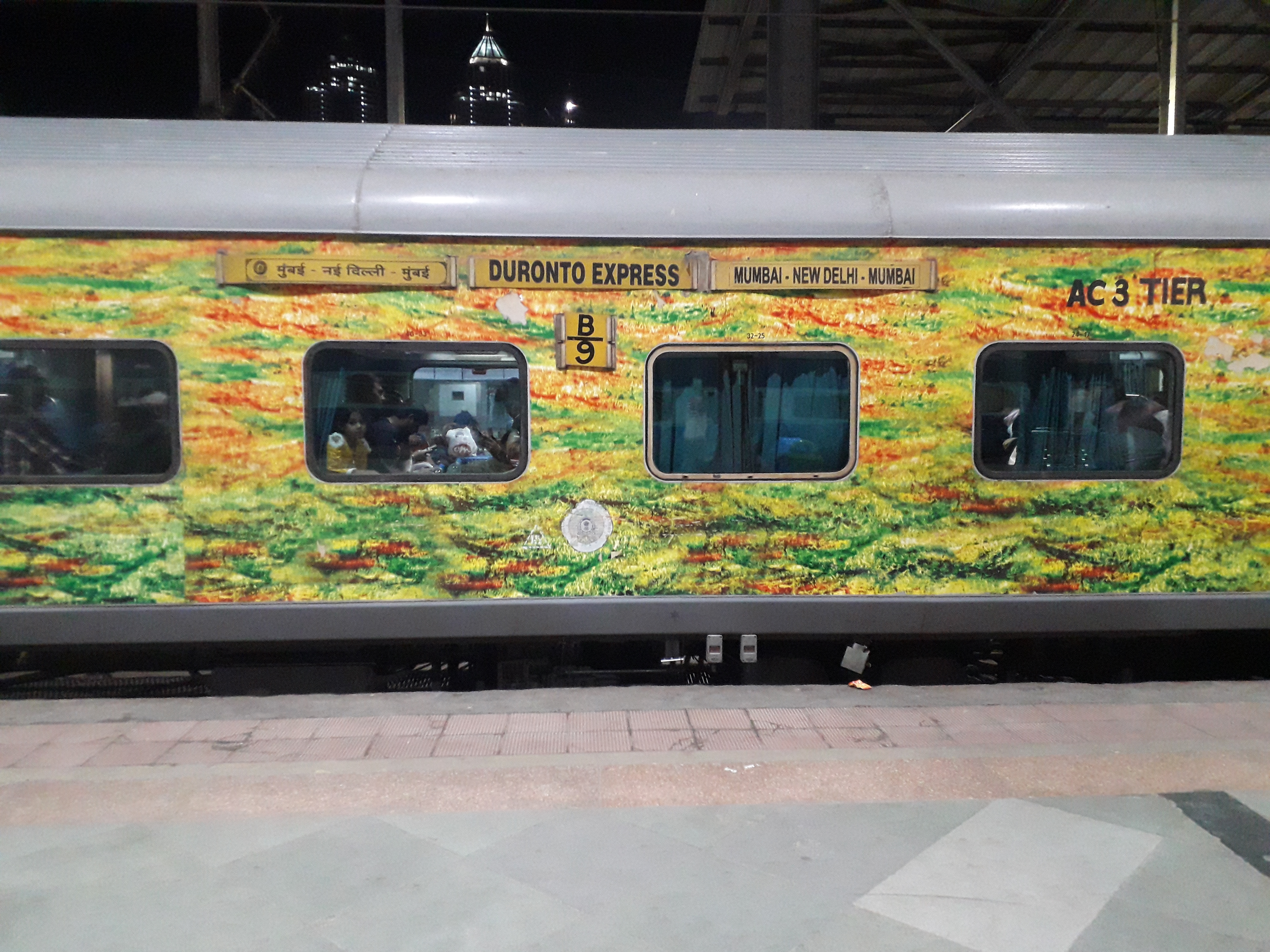
22209 Mumbai–New Delhi Duronto Express – AC 3 tier coach

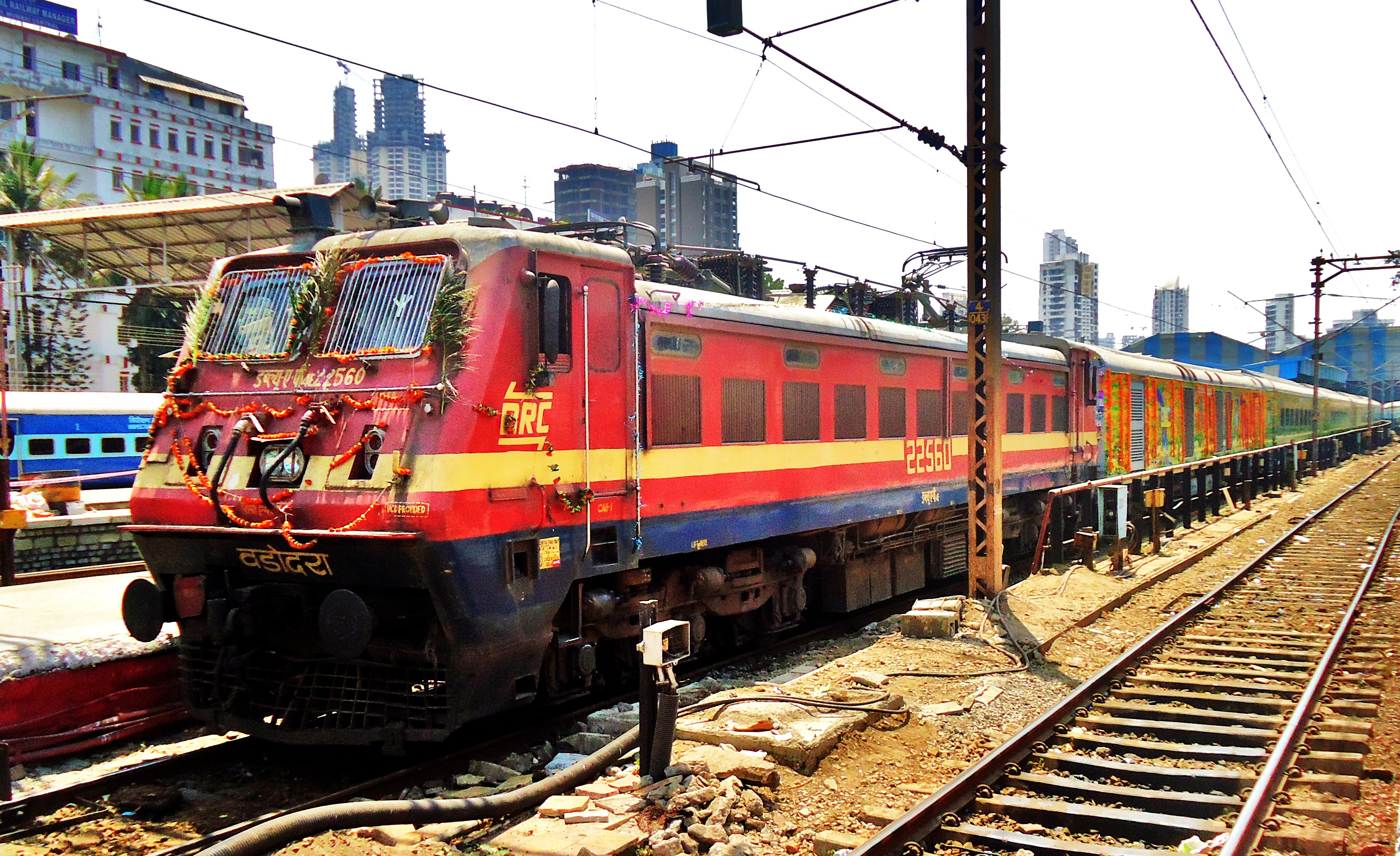
Mumbai Duronto at Mumbai Central on 18 March 2012

== Other trains ==
Other prominent trains that connect Mumbai and Delhi are:

1. Chandigarh–Bandra Terminus Superfast Express
2. Swaraj Express
3. Lokmanya Tilak Terminus–Haridwar AC
4. Paschim Express
5. Maharashtra Sampark Kranti Express
6. Mumbai Rajdhani Express
7. Bandra Terminus–Hazrat Nizamuddin Yuva Express
8. Bandra Terminus–Hazrat Nizamuddin Garib Rath Express
9. August Kranti Rajdhani Express
10. Golden Temple Mail
11. Punjab Mail
12. Mumbai Chhatrapati Shivaji Maharaj Terminus–Amritsar Express
13. Delhi Sarai Rohilla–Bandra Terminus Garib Rath Express
14. Bandra Terminus–Haridwar Express
15. Mumbai CSMT–Hazrat Nizamuddin Rajdhani Express
16. Bandra Terminus-Haridwar SF Express
17. Bandra Terminus–Lal Kuan Weekly Superfast Express

== Sister trains ==
- August Kranti Rajdhani Express
- Bandra Terminus–Hazrat Nizamuddin AC Superfast Express
- Bandra Terminus–Hazrat Nizamuddin Garib Rath Express
- Bandra Terminus–Hazrat Nizamuddin Yuva Express
- Delhi Sarai Rohilla–Bandra Terminus Garib Rath Express
- Lokmanya Tilak Terminus–Hazrat Nizamuddin AC Express
- Maharashtra Sampark Kranti Express
- Mumbai Rajdhani Express
- Mumbai CSMT–Hazrat Nizamuddin Rajdhani Express
