= Delhi Sarai Rohilla–Bandra Terminus Garib Rath Express =

Train in India

Delhi Sarai Rohilla – Bandra Terminus Garib Rath Express
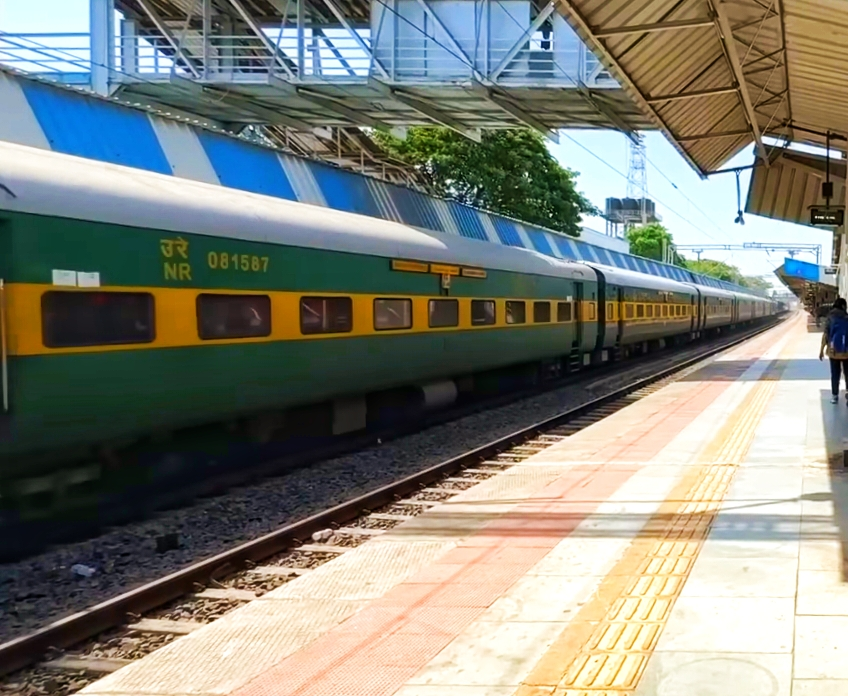
- Delhi Sarai Rohilla – Bandra Terminus Garib Rath Express Skipping Navsari railway station

Overview
- Service type: Superfast, Garib Rath
- Locale: Delhi, Haryana, Rajasthan, Gujarat & Maharashtra
- First service: 5 February 2008; 18 years ago
- Current operator: Northern Railway

Route
- Termini: Delhi Sarai Rohilla (DEE); Bandra Terminus (BDTS)
- Stops: 17
- Distance travelled: 1,433.5 km (891 mi)
- Average journey time: 22 hours 50 minutes
- Service frequency: 4 days a week.
- Train number: 12215 / 12216

On-board services
- Classes: AC 3 tier, AC 2 tier, Sleeper class, General Unreserved
- Seating arrangements: Yes
- Sleeping arrangements: Yes
- Catering facilities: On-board catering E-catering
- Observation facilities: Large windows
- Baggage facilities: Available
- Other facilities: Below the seats

Technical
- Rolling stock: LHB coach
- Track gauge: 1,676 mm (5 ft 6 in)
- Operating speed: 130 km/h (81 mph) maximum, 62.5 km/h (39 mph) average including halts
Route map
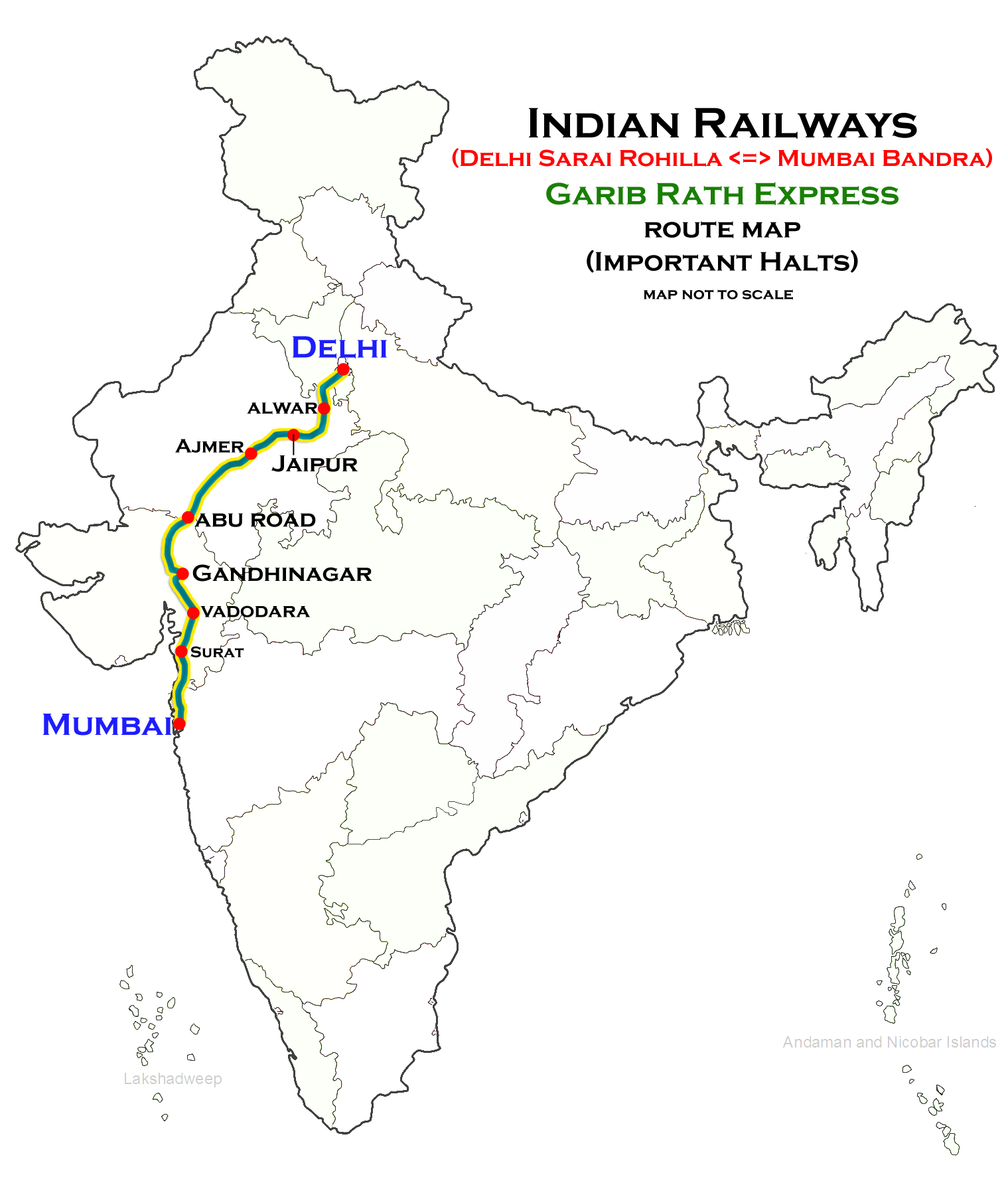

The 12215 / 12216 Delhi Sarai Rohilla–Bandra Terminus Garib Rath Express is a Superfast Express train of the Garib Rath category belonging to Indian Railways – Northern Railway zone that runs between Delhi Sarai Rohilla and Bandra Terminus in India. It has Ghaziabad-based WAP-5 (earlier was WDM-3A).

It operates as train number 12215 from Delhi Sarai Rohilla to Bandra Terminus and as train number 12216 in the reverse direction, serving the states of Delhi, Haryana, Rajasthan, Gujarat and Maharashtra.

When the train was introduced, it ran only up to Jaipur Junction being subsequently extended to Mumbai Bandra Terminus.

== Service ==
- The 12215 Delhi Sarai Rohilla–Bandra Terminus Garib Rath Express covers the distance of 1431 kilometres in 22 hours 50 mins (63 km/h).
- The 12216 Bandra Terminus–Delhi Sarai Rohilla Garib Rath Express covers the distance of 1431 kilometres in 23 hours 30 mins (61 km/h).

As the average speed of the train is above 55 km/h (34 mph), as per Indian Railways rules, its fare includes a Superfast surcharge. It touches 130 kmph, with Ghaziabad or Vadodara-based WAP-7. The 12215 / 12216 Delhi Sarai Rohilla–Bandra Terminus Garib Rath Express runs from Delhi Sarai Rohilla via Delhi Cantonment, Gurgaon, Rewari Junction, Alwar Junction, Jaipur Junction, Ajmer Junction, Abu Road, Palanpur Junction, Gandhinagar Capital, Ahmedabad Junction, Nadiad Junction, Vadodara Junction, Surat, Borivali to Bandra Terminus and vice versa.

== Coaches ==
The 12215/12216 Delhi Sarai Rohilla–Bandra Terminus Garib Rath Express presently has LHB coaches of which 20 AC 3 tier economy coaches along with 2 EOG coaches. It does not have a pantry car. it has 22 coaches which is equal to Bandra Terminus–Hazrat Nizamuddin Garib Rath Express and Mumbai Rajdhani Express. Earlier this Garib Rath Express was used to have a ICF coach

As with most train services in India, coach composition may be amended at the discretion of Indian Railways, depending on demand.

-:COACH COMPOSITION:-

Loco	1	2	3	4	5	6	7	8	9	10	11	12	13	14	15	16	17	18	19	20	21	22
	EOG	G1	G2	G3	G4	G5	G6	G7	G8	G9	G10	G11	G12	G13	G14	G15	G16	G17	G18	G19	G20	EOG

== Gallery ==
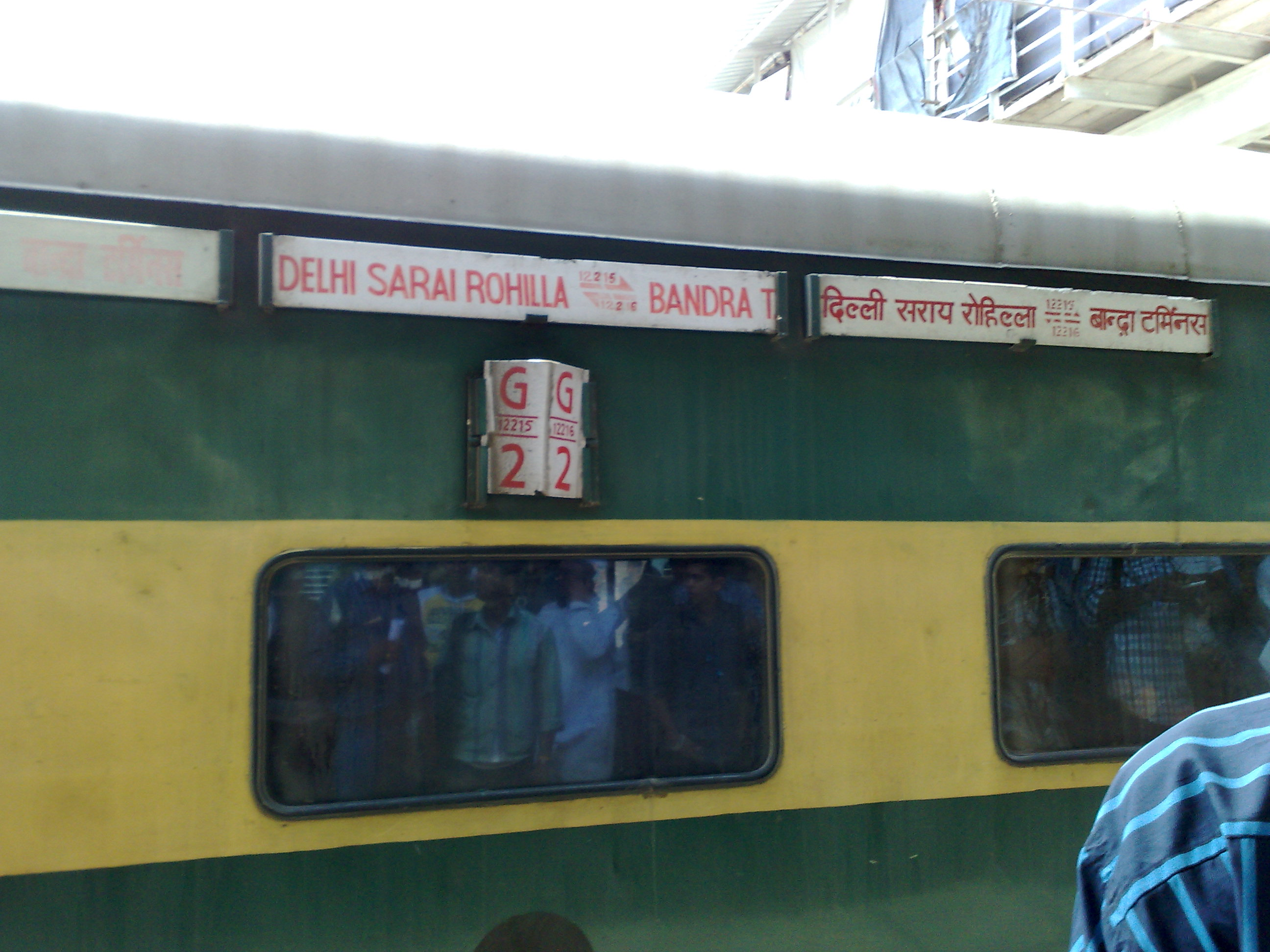
Delhi–Sarai Rohilla–Bandra Terminus Garib Rath Express – AC 3 tier coach

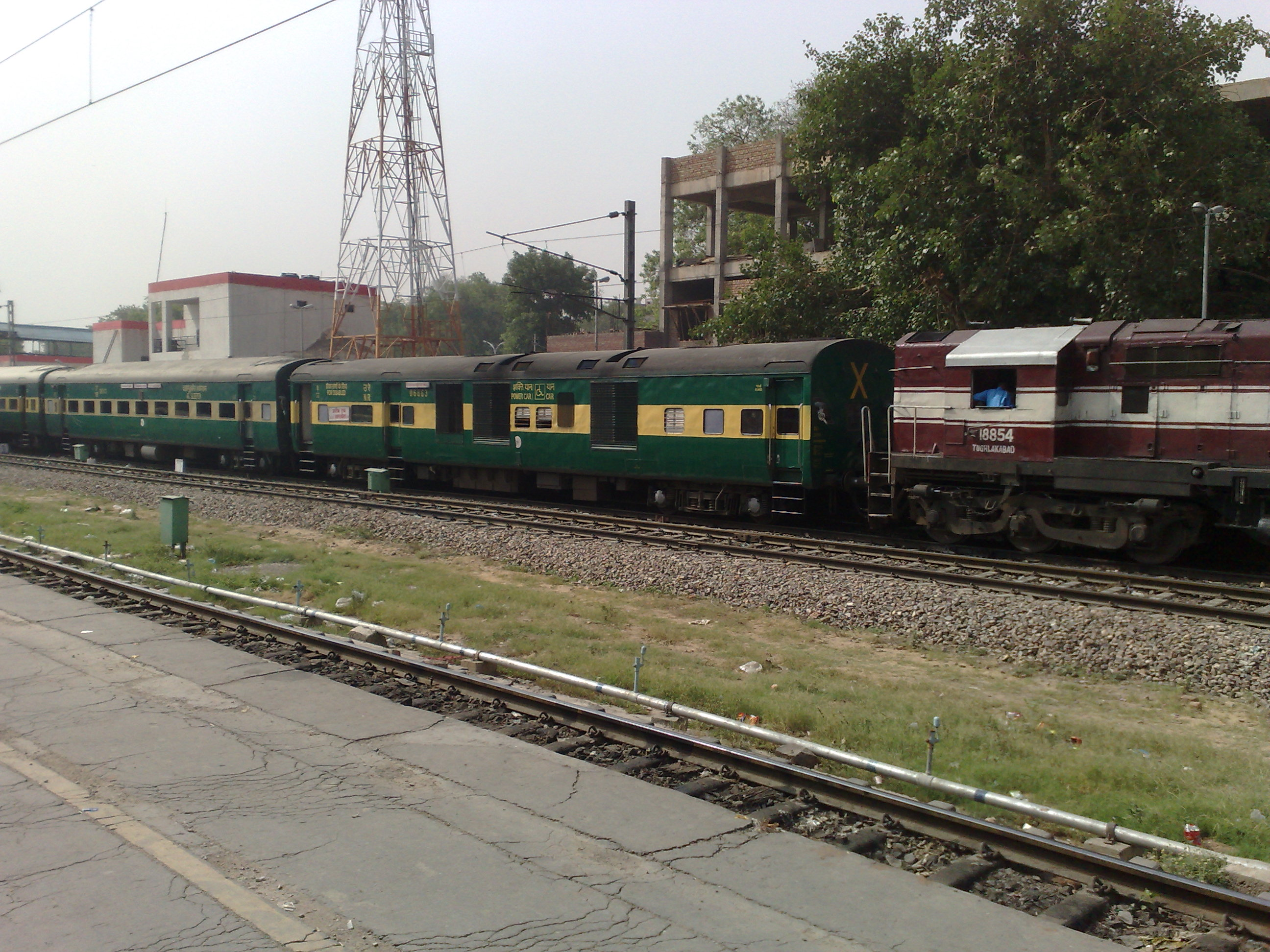
12215 Delhi Sarai Rohilla–Bandra Terminus Garib Rath Express at platform 1 of Delhi Sarai Rohilla railway station

== Sister trains ==
- August Kranti Rajdhani Express
- Bandra Terminus–Hazrat Nizamuddin Garib Rath Express
- Bandra Terminus–Hazrat Nizamuddin Yuva Express
- Lokmanya Tilak Terminus–Hazrat Nizamuddin AC Express
- Maharashtra Sampark Kranti Express
- Mumbai–New Delhi Duronto Express
- Mumbai Rajdhani Express
- Mumbai CSMT–Hazrat Nizamuddin Rajdhani Express
