= Bandra Terminus–Hazrat Nizamuddin Yuva Express =

Train in India

Bandra Terminus – Hazrat Nizamuddin Yuva Express
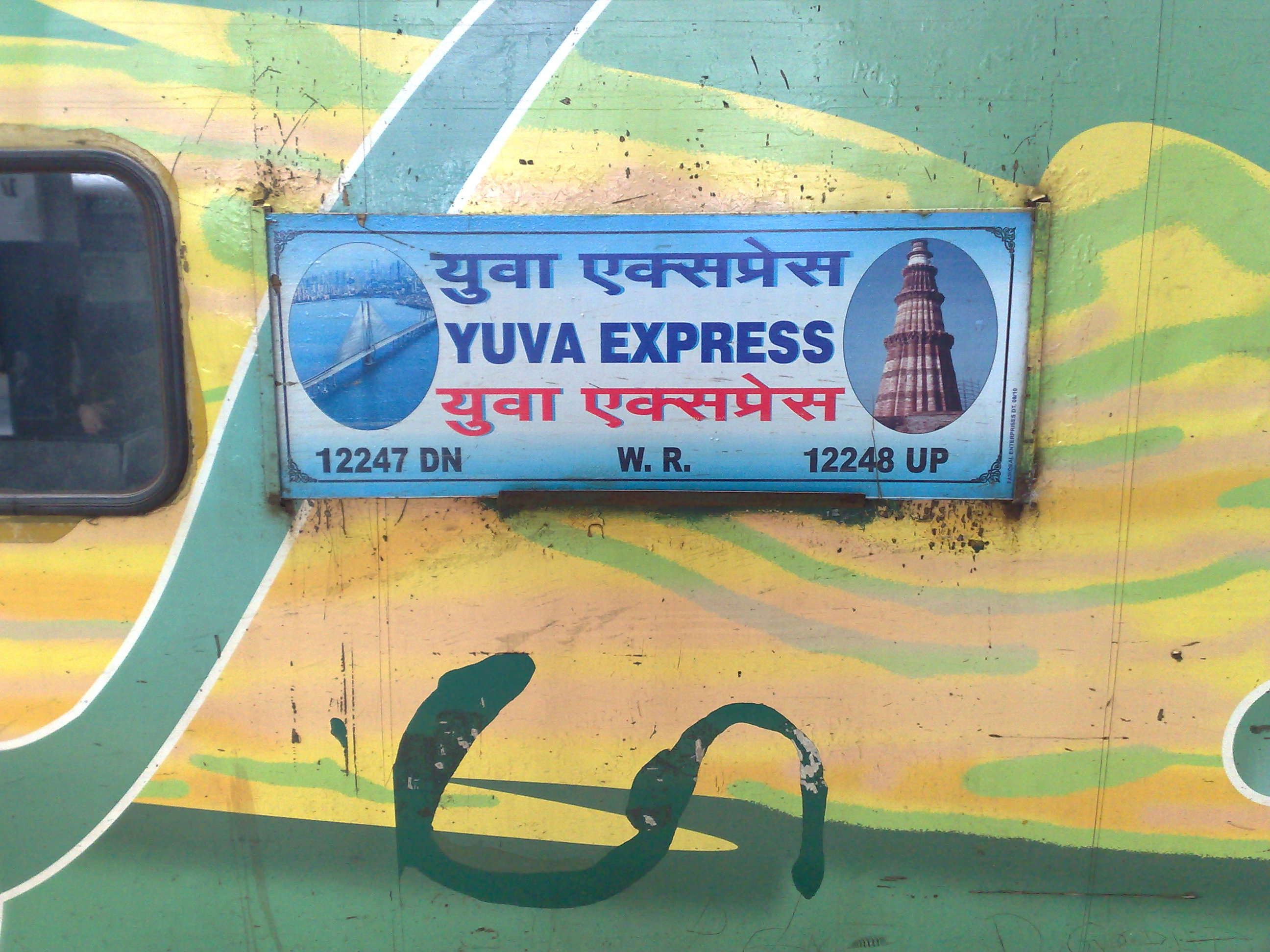

Overview
- Service type: Yuva Express
- First service: 15 January 2010; 16 years ago
- Current operator: Western Railway

Route
- Termini: Bandra Terminus (BDTS); Hazrat Nizamuddin (NZM)
- Stops: 5
- Distance travelled: 1,367 km (849 mi)
- Average journey time: 16 hour 45 minutes
- Service frequency: Weekly
- Train number: 12247 / 12248

On-board services
- Classes: AC Chair Car, AC 3 Tier
- Seating arrangements: Yes
- Sleeping arrangements: Yes
- Auto-rack arrangements: Overhead racks
- Catering facilities: On-board catering, E-catering
- Observation facilities: Large windows
- Baggage facilities: No
- Other facilities: Below the seats

Technical
- Rolling stock: LHB coach
- Track gauge: 1,676 mm (5 ft 6 in)
- Operating speed: 82 km/h (51 mph) average including halts, 130 km/h (81 mph) maximum.
Route map
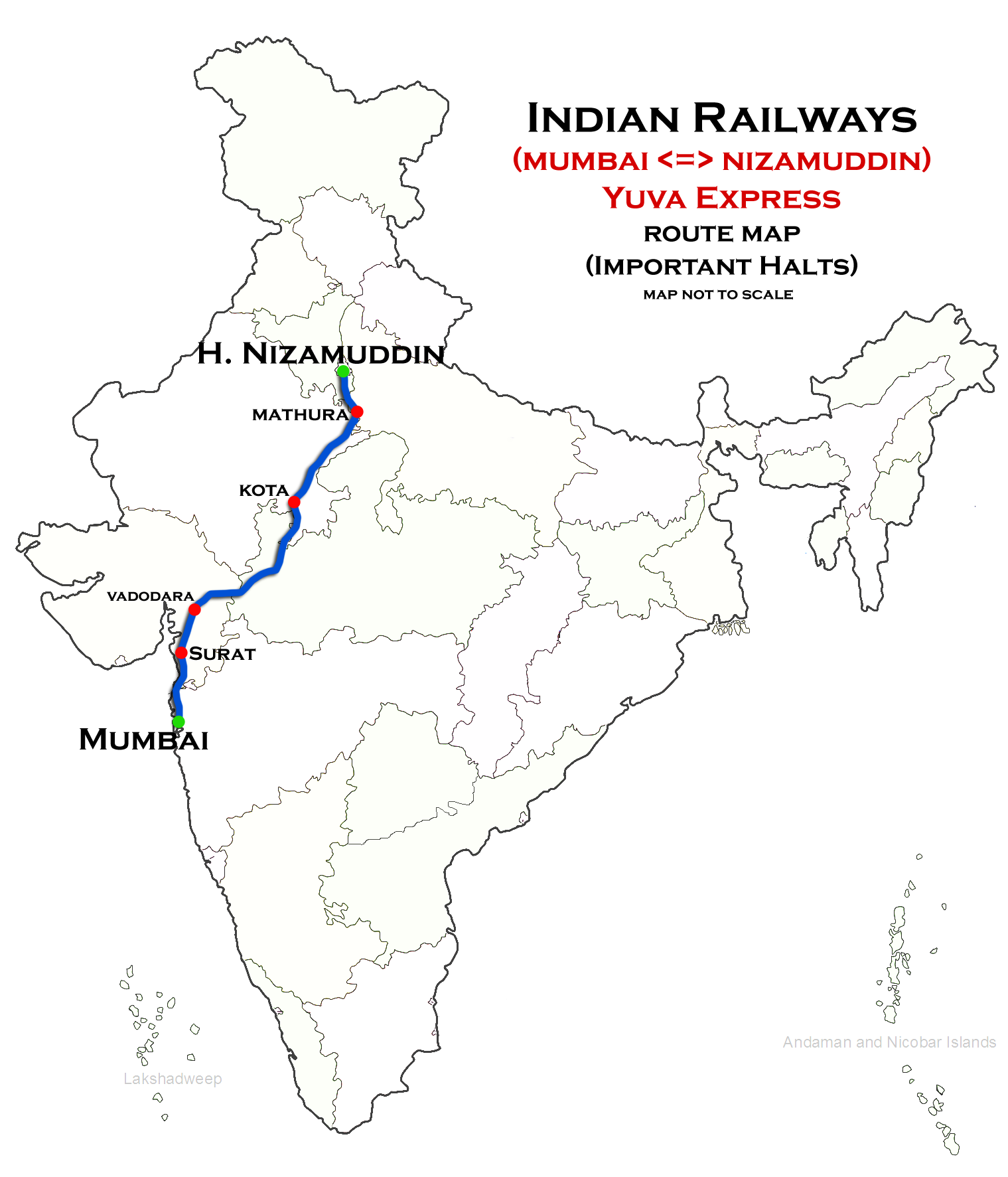

The 12247 / 12248 Bandra Terminus–Hazrat Nizamuddin Yuva Express is a Yuva Express train belonging to Indian Railways that runs between Bandra Terminus and Hazrat Nizamuddin in India. It serves the states of Maharashtra, Gujarat, Madhya Pradesh, Rajasthan, Uttar Pradesh & Delhi. As of 2025, it is the only operating train of its class.

== Coach composition ==
Initially, the train was operated with 19 ICF coaches, consisting of 2 Generator Cars (EOG), 6 AC Economy Chair Car Coaches (J) and 11 Third AC coaches (3A). The chair car coaches were painted in the characteristic Yuva Express livery, while the Third AC coaches bore the ICF Rajdhani or ICF Garib Rath livery.

From 2 May, 2025, the train has been running with a rake of 22 Linke-Hoffman Busch coaches, consisting of 2 Generator Cars (EOG), 2 AC Chair Car Coaches (CC) and 18 Third AC Economy coaches (3E). It shares its rake with the Bandra Terminus - Bikaner AC Superfast Express. The primary maintenance is executed at Bandra Terminus.

Legends
EOG/SLR	PC	MIL	H	A	HA	B	AB	G	K	E	C	S	D	GEN/UR
Generator cum luggage van	Pantry car or Hot buffet car	Military coach	First AC (1A)	Second AC (2A)	First AC cum Second AC	Third AC (3A)	Third AC cum Second AC	Third AC economy (3E)	Anubhuti coach (K)	Executive chair car (EC)	AC Chair car (CC)	Sleeper class (SL)	Second seating (2S)	General or Unreserved
	Loco and other service coach													
	AC coach													
	Non-AC coach													

Coach composition of 12247 (ex. Bandra Terminus)

Loco	1	2	3	4	5	6	7	8	9	10	11	12	13	14	15	16	17	18	19	20	21	22
	EOG	C2	C1	M18	M17	M16	M15	M14	M13	M12	M11	M10	M9	M8	M7	M6	M5	M4	M3	M2	M1	EOG

Coach composition of 12248 (ex. Hazrat Nizamuddin)

Loco	1	2	3	4	5	6	7	8	9	10	11	12	13	14	15	16	17	18	19	20	21	22
	EOG	M1	M2	M3	M4	M5	M6	M7	M8	M9	M10	M11	M12	M13	M14	M15	M16	M17	M18	C1	C2	EOG

== Service ==
- The 12247 Bandra Terminus – Hazrat Nizamuddin Yuva Express leaves Bandra Terminus at 17:30 hrs every Friday and arrives at Hazrat Nizamuddin the next day at 10:15 hrs.
- The 12248 Hazrat Nizamuddin – Bandra Terminus Yuva Express leaves Hazrat Nizamuddin at 16:30 hrs every Saturday and reaches Bandra Terminus the next day at 09:15 hrs.
- The train covers a distance of 1,367 km (849 mi) in 16 hrs 45 min, averaging at 82 km/h (51 mph). The maximum permissible speed is 130 km/h (81 mph).
- As the average speed of the train is more than 55 km/h, its fare includes a superfast surcharge.

== Route and halts ==
The train travels along the Mumbai - Delhi main line. The halts of this train are as given below:

1. Bandra Terminus (start)
2. Surat
3. Vadodara Junction
4. Ratlam Junction
5. Kota Junction
6. Mathura Junction
7. Hazrat Nizamuddin (end)

== Traction ==
The route is fully electrified. Prior to Western Railway switching to the AC traction, it would be hauled by a WCAM-2/2P engine until Vadodara Junction after which it would get either a WAP-7 locomotive from Ghaziabad shed or a WAP-4 and WAP5 from the Vadodara shed.

Since Western Railway switched over to AC traction in February 2012, it is hauled from end to end by a WAP-7 and WAP5 so was WAP-4 electric locomotive from Vadodara Loco Shed.

== Gallery ==
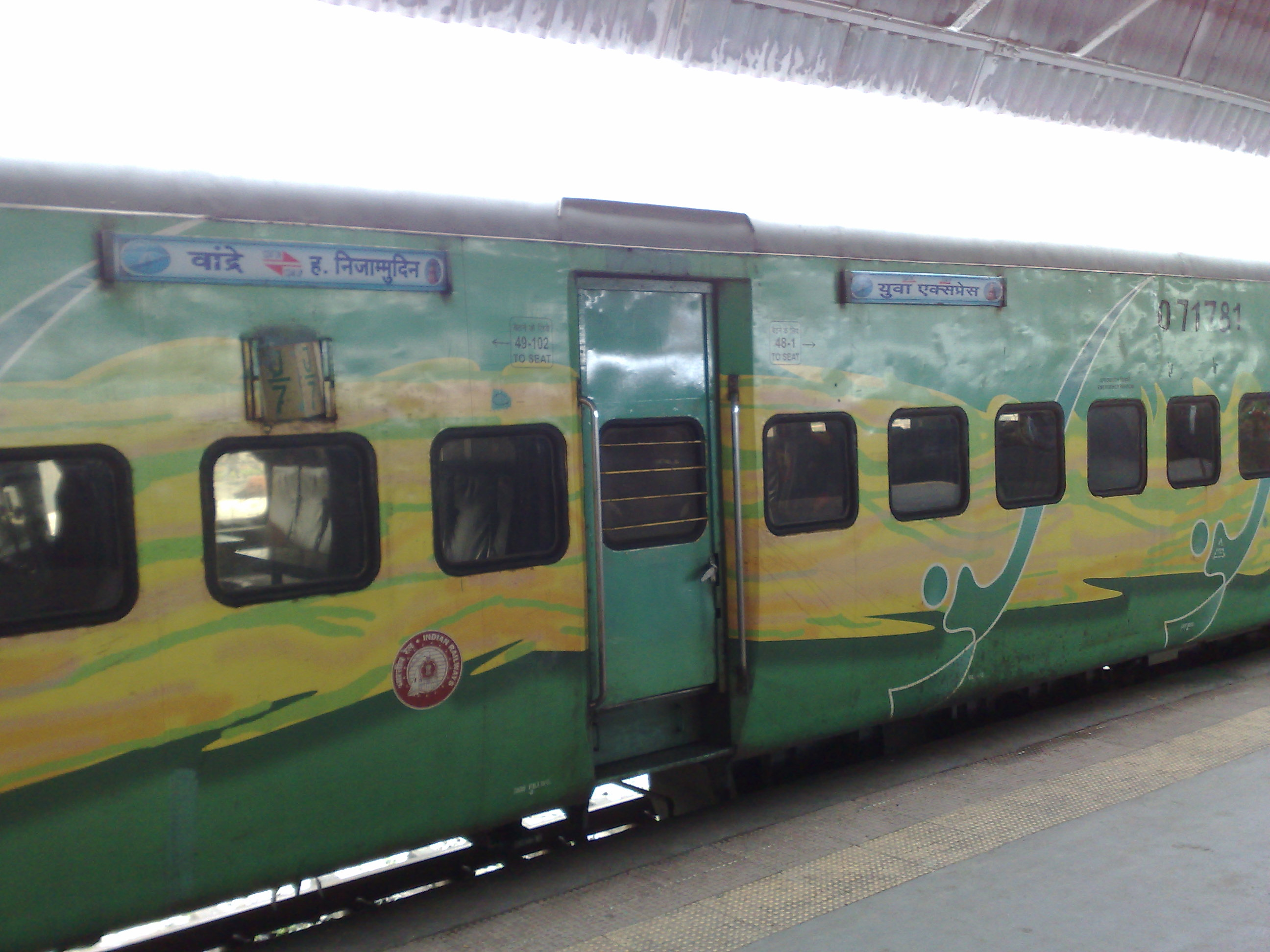
12247 Yuva Express – AC Chair Car

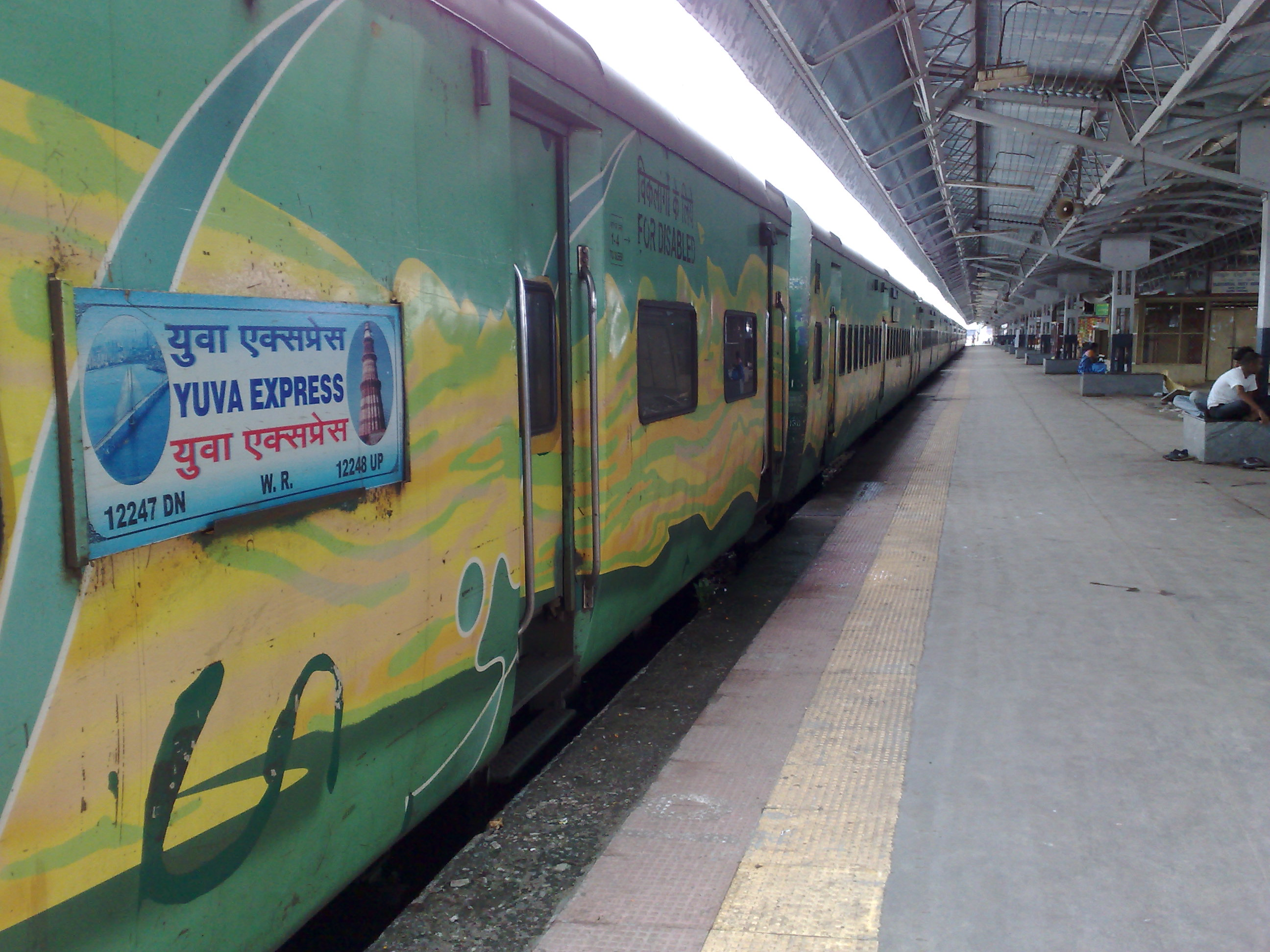
12247 Yuva Express at Bandra Terminus

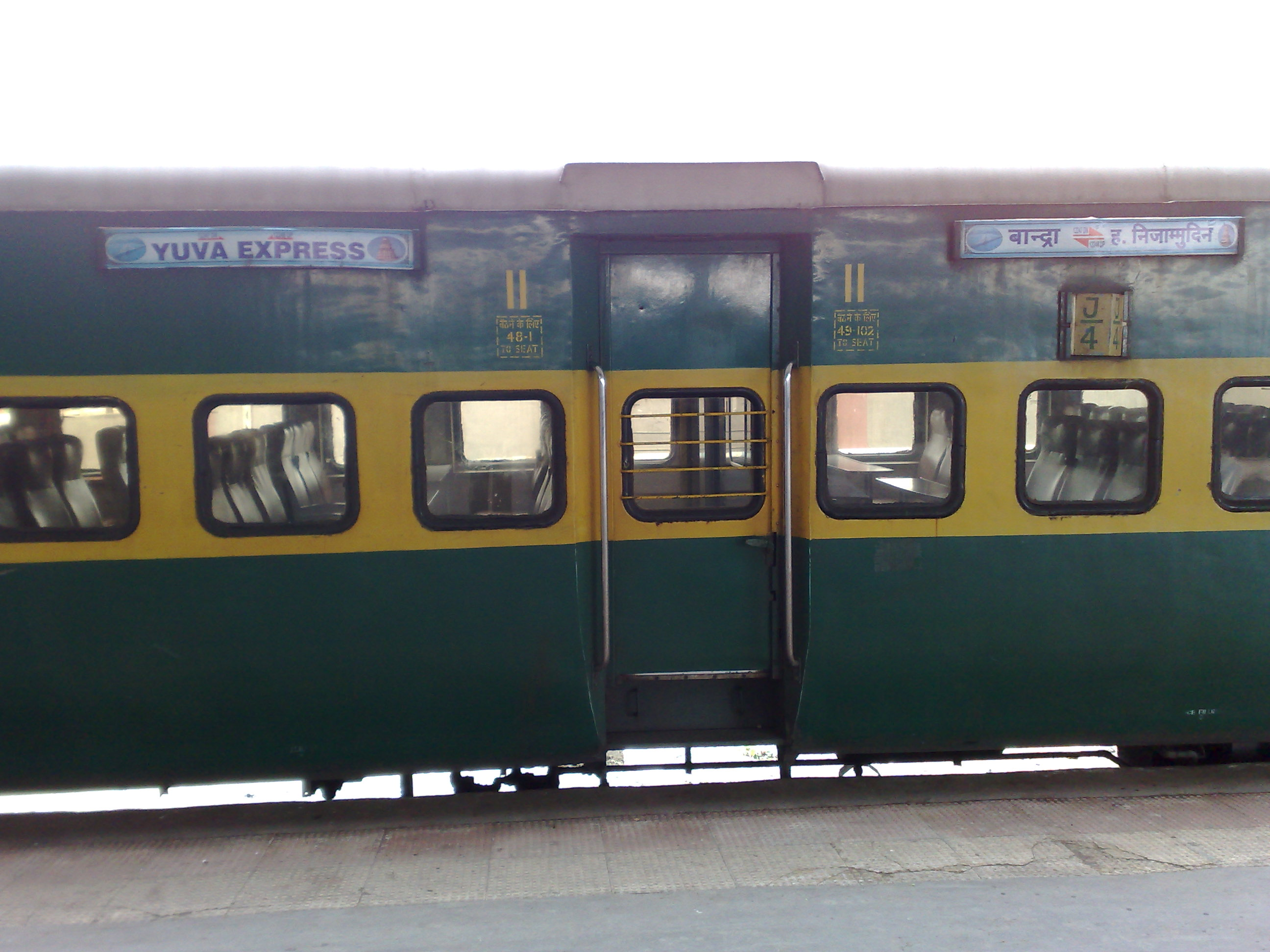
12247 Yuva Express – coach J4

== Sister trains ==
- August Kranti Rajdhani Express
- Bandra Terminus–Hazrat Nizamuddin AC Superfast Express
- Bandra Terminus–Hazrat Nizamuddin Garib Rath Express
- Delhi Sarai Rohilla Bandra Terminus Garib Rath Express
- Lokmanya Tilak Terminus–Hazrat Nizamuddin AC Express
- Maharashtra Sampark Kranti Express
- Mumbai–New Delhi Duronto Express
- Mumbai Rajdhani Express
- Mumbai CSMT–Hazrat Nizamuddin Rajdhani Express
