= Howrah–Anand Vihar Yuva Express =

Train in India

Howrah–Anand Vihar Terminal Yuva Express
Overview
- Service type: Yuva Express
- Locale: West Bengal, Jharkhand, Uttar Pradesh & Delhi
- First service: 30 December 2009; 16 years ago
- Last service: Discontinued on 19 May 2020; 5 years ago
- Current operator: Eastern Railway

Route
- Termini: Howrah Junction (HWH); Anand Vihar Terminal (ANVT)
- Stops: 5
- Distance travelled: 1,447 km (899 mi)
- Average journey time: 16 hrs 45 mins
- Service frequency: Weekly
- Train number: 12249 / 12250

On-board services
- Classes: AC Chair Car, AC 2 Tier, AC 3 Tier
- Seating arrangements: Yes
- Sleeping arrangements: Yes
- Catering facilities: Available
- Observation facilities: Small windows
- Baggage facilities: Available
- Other facilities: Below the seats

Technical
- Rolling stock: ICF coach
- Track gauge: 1,676 mm (5 ft 6 in)
- Operating speed: 82 km/h (51 mph) average including halts.

The Howrah–Anand Vihar Terminal Yuva Express was a Yuva Express series train of Indian Railways, that connected Kolkata, the capital of West Bengal to Anand Vihar Terminal in Delhi, the national capital.

Eastern Railway cancelled its operations permanently from 19 May 2020.

== History ==
The train was inaugurated by former railway minister Mamata Banerjee, to help the youths of both towns to ply in between. This train was considered to be the cheapest of all AC trains between the two cities. It started as a weekly service between New Delhi and Howrah, but the train was shifted to Anand Vihar w.e.f. 13 December 2015.

== Background ==
Sixty percent seats of the train were reserved for students, low-income groups & people belonging to the age group of 18-45yrs. To avail this facility, a traveller must had an age/income proof.

== Composition ==
This train consisted of ten AC Chair Car coaches with five AC 3 Tier coaches and with two End-On-Generation Vans. This train ran with old ICF coaches with a green and yellow livery which is themed on vibrant, contrasting and lively youth of the nation. As of 2020, the use of ICF coaches was risky due to their old condition, as old Rajdhani coaches are of the 90s, they are not capable of running at speed such as 130 KMPH, thus on 19 May 2020 its services were discontinued.

== Locomotive ==
The train was regularly hauled by a Howrah shed WAP-4 or WAP-7 locomotive.

== See also ==
- Bandra Terminus–Hazrat Nizamuddin Yuva Express
