= Yuva Express =

Series of Indian express trains

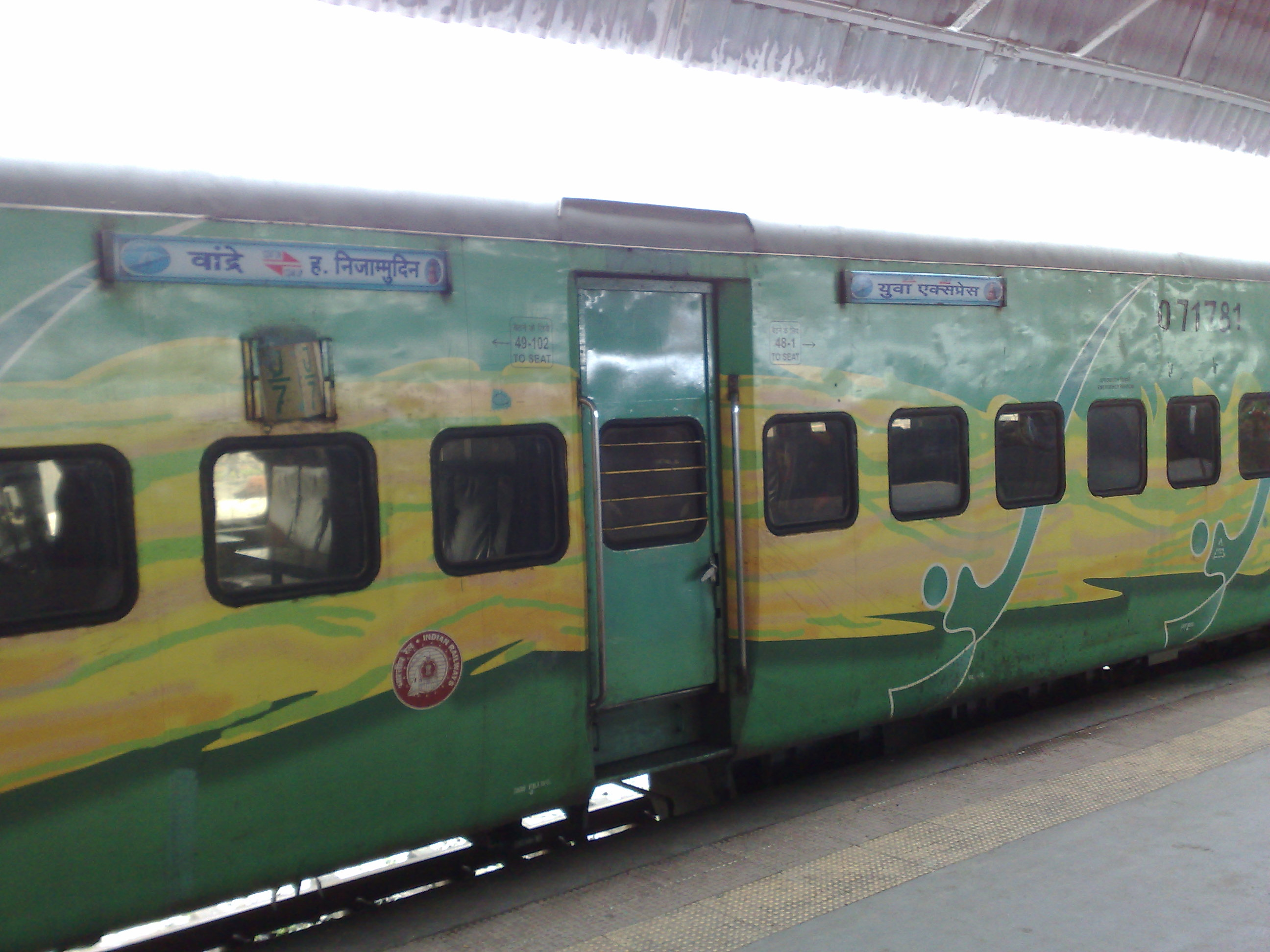
- Bandra Terminus–Hazrat Nizamuddin Yuva Express

Overview
- Service type: Superfast
- Status: Operating
- First service: 2009
- Current operator: Indian Railways
- Website: http://indianrail.gov.in

Route
- Train number: 12247/12248

On-board services
- Classes: CC, 3AC, 2AC
- Seating arrangements: Yes
- Sleeping arrangements: Yes
- Catering facilities: On-board catering E-catering

Technical
- Rolling stock: LHB coach (earlier was ICF coach)
- Track gauge: 5 ft 6 in (1,676 mm) broad gauge
- Operating speed: 80 km/h (50 mph) average including halts

The Yuva Express is a type of trains in India that was introduced by Minister of Railways Mamata Banerjee in 2009-2010 along with the Duronto Express. The Yuva trains were supposed to be a low-cost air-conditioned alternative for the youth, unemployed, and migrant labor, with Duronto targeting more affluent passengers. The first train linked Howrah and Delhi. Only one Yuva Express is currently operated by Indian Railways.

== Active services ==
Train No.	Train Name	Distance	Frequency	Zone
12247/12248	Bandra Terminus–Hazrat Nizamuddin Yuva Express	1,367 km (849 mi)	Weekly	Western Railways

== Defunct services ==
Train No.	Train Name	Distance	Frequency	Zone
12249/12250	Howrah–Anand Vihar Yuva Express	1,438 km (894 mi)	Weekly	Eastern Railways
22309/22310	Howrah–New Jalpaiguri AC Yuva Express	561 km (349 mi)	Weekly	Eastern Railways

== See also ==
- AC Superfast Express
- Vande Bharat Express
- Gatimaan Express
- Humsafar Express
- Tejas Express
- Double Decker Express
- Duronto Express
- Rajdhani Express
- Shatabdi Express
- Jan Shatabdi Express
- Uday Express
- Antyodaya Express
- Garib Rath Express
- Mahamana Express
