= Mumbai CSMT–Hazrat Nizamuddin Rajdhani Express =

Train in India

Mumbai CSMT-Hazrat Nizamuddin Rajdhani Express
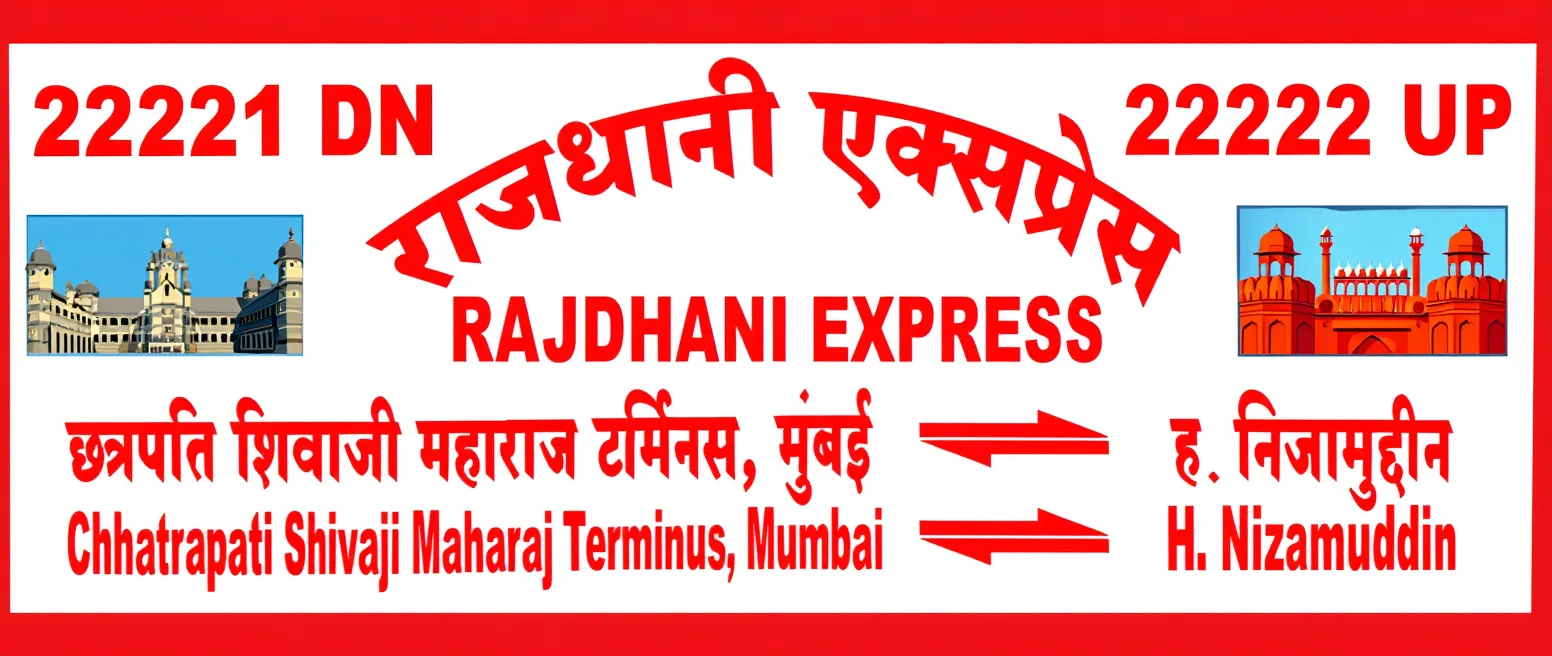

Overview
- Service type: Rajdhani Express
- Locale: Maharashtra, Madhya Pradesh, Rajasthan, Uttar Pradesh, Haryana & Delhi
- First service: 19 January 2019; 7 years ago
- Current operator: Central Railways

Route
- Termini: Mumbai CSMT (CSMT); Hazrat Nizamuddin (NZM)
- Stops: 8
- Distance travelled: 1,540 km (957 mi)
- Average journey time: 17 hrs 55 mins
- Service frequency: Daily
- Train number: 22221 / 22222

On-board services
- Classes: AC First Class, AC 2 Tier, AC 3 Tier
- Seating arrangements: Yes
- Sleeping arrangements: Yes
- Catering facilities: Available
- Observation facilities: Large windows
- Baggage facilities: No
- Other facilities: Below the seats

Technical
- Rolling stock: LHB coach
- Track gauge: 1,676 mm (5 ft 6 in)
- Operating speed: 130 km/h (81 mph) maximum, 86 km/h (53 mph) average including halts.

The 22221 / 22222 Mumbai CSMT–Hazrat Nizamuddin Rajdhani Express, (also known as Central Railway 'CR' Rajdhani Express) is a daily train service of Rajdhani class operated by Central Railway between Chhatrapati Shivaji Maharaj Terminus and Hazrat Nizamuddin. It is India’s Second Fastest Rajdhani Express operated by Indian Railways and also in the list of Top-10 Fastest Trains of Indian Railways.

== History ==
Proposal for a new Rajdhani service from inner Maharashtra was in demand for some time, especially since Mumbai Rajdhani and August Kranti Rajdhani serve only the Mumbai area. This demand was further put down by the MP of Nashik Hemant Godse, after which an in-principle approval from the Railway Minister Piyush Goyal was given in December 2018.

The challenge to running a Rajdhani service on this route was the Thull Ghat between Kasara and Igatpuri, for which every train would stop at both stations for banker attachment and detachment, an arrangement that wasted a significant amount of time and which remained a barrier for a long time. Trials were conducted by RDSO and Central Railway of using two WAP-7 locomotives with a 20 LHB car rake in a push-pull arrangement. Several changes were made to accommodate the Rajdhani service, including changing the timings of several express and suburban trains and train crew being trained to work till Jalgaon, instead of Igatpuri. Even before the launch, seats for the first service were fully booked in 5 hours.

The Rajdhani service was launched on 19 January 2019 as a bi-weekly service, with much fanfare at Mumbai CSMT, Nashik Road and Jalgaon Junction. Service was increased from bi-weekly to 4 days a week, citing the popularity of the service.

On 19 January 2021, on its 2nd running anniversary, Central Railway and Indian Railways increased 22221/22222 Rajdhani frequency from 4 days a week to daily basis.

== Timings ==
22221 Rajdhani leaves Chhatrapati Shivaji Maharaj Terminus at 16:00 daily and arrives at Hazrat Nizamuddin at 09:55 the next day.

22222 Rajdhani leaves Hazrat Nizamuddin at 16:55 daily and arrives at Chhatrapati Shivaji Maharaj Terminus at 11:15 the next day.

CR Rajdhani Express runs with an average speed of 86 km/h.

== Coach composition ==
CR Rajdhani Express runs with LHB rolling stock composition as below:

- 12 AC Three Tier (3A)
- 5 AC Two Tier (2A)
- 1 AC First Class (1A)
- 1 Pantry car (PC)
- 2 Luggage Brake & Generator car (EOG)

| Loco | 1 | 2 | 3 | 4 | 5 | 6 | 7 | 8 | 9 | 10 | 11 | 12 | 13 | 14 | 15 | 16 | 17 | 18 | 19 | 20 | 21 | Loco |
|---|---|---|---|---|---|---|---|---|---|---|---|---|---|---|---|---|---|---|---|---|---|---|
| | EOG | B12 | B11 | B10 | B9 | B8 | B7 | B6 | B5 | B4 | B3 | B2 | B1 | PC | H1 | A1 | A2 | A3 | A4 | A5 | EOG | |

CR Rajdhani Express is run using three LHB Rakes, which are maintained at Wadi Bunder coaching depot, located near Sandhurst Road railway station.

== Traction ==
It is hauled by two Kalyan Loco Shed-based head on generation equipped WAP-7 or WAP-5 locomotives in a push-pull configuration. This configuration eliminated technical halts at Kasara and Igatpuri for banker attachment and detachment, becoming the first train to do so in the process.

== Route & halts ==
- Chhatrapati Shivaji Maharaj Terminus
- Kalyan Junction
- Nasik Road
- Jalgaon Junction
- Bhusaval Junction
- Bhopal Junction
- Jhansi Junction
- Gwalior Junction
- Agra Cantt
- Hazrat Nizamuddin
