= August Kranti Rajdhani Express =

Train in India

August Kranti Tejas Rajdhani Express
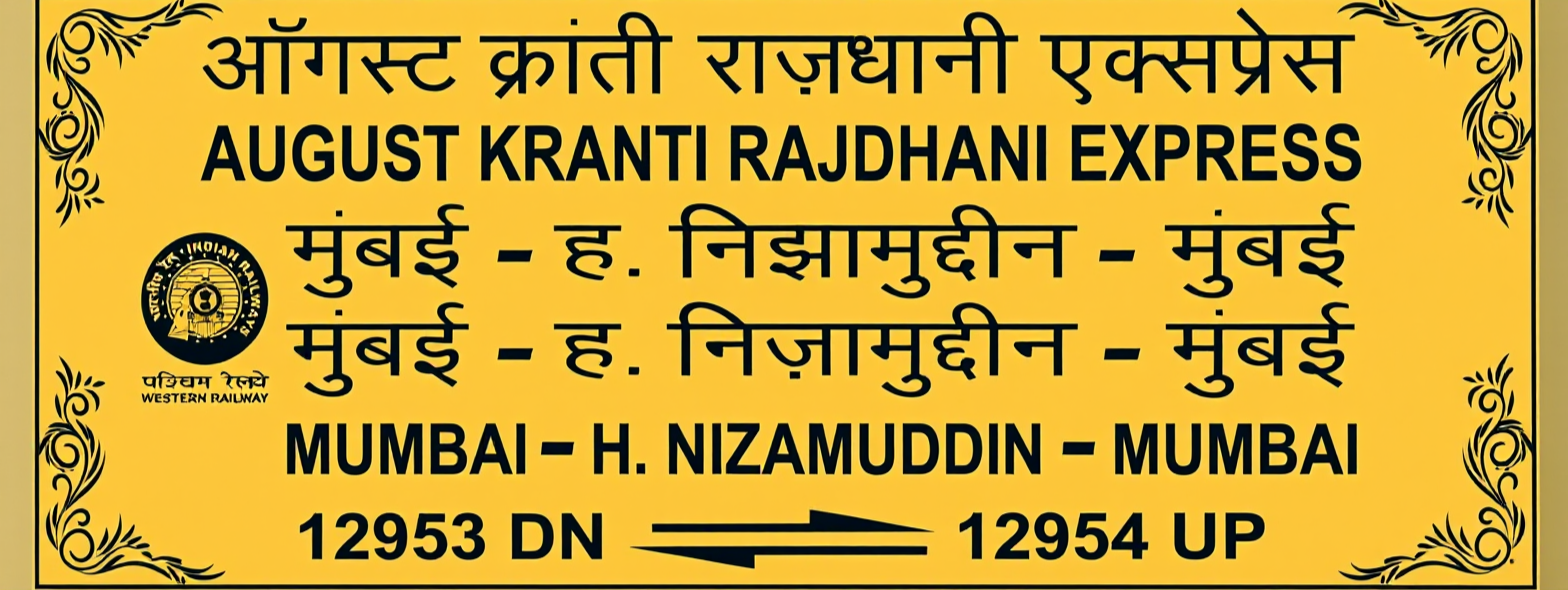

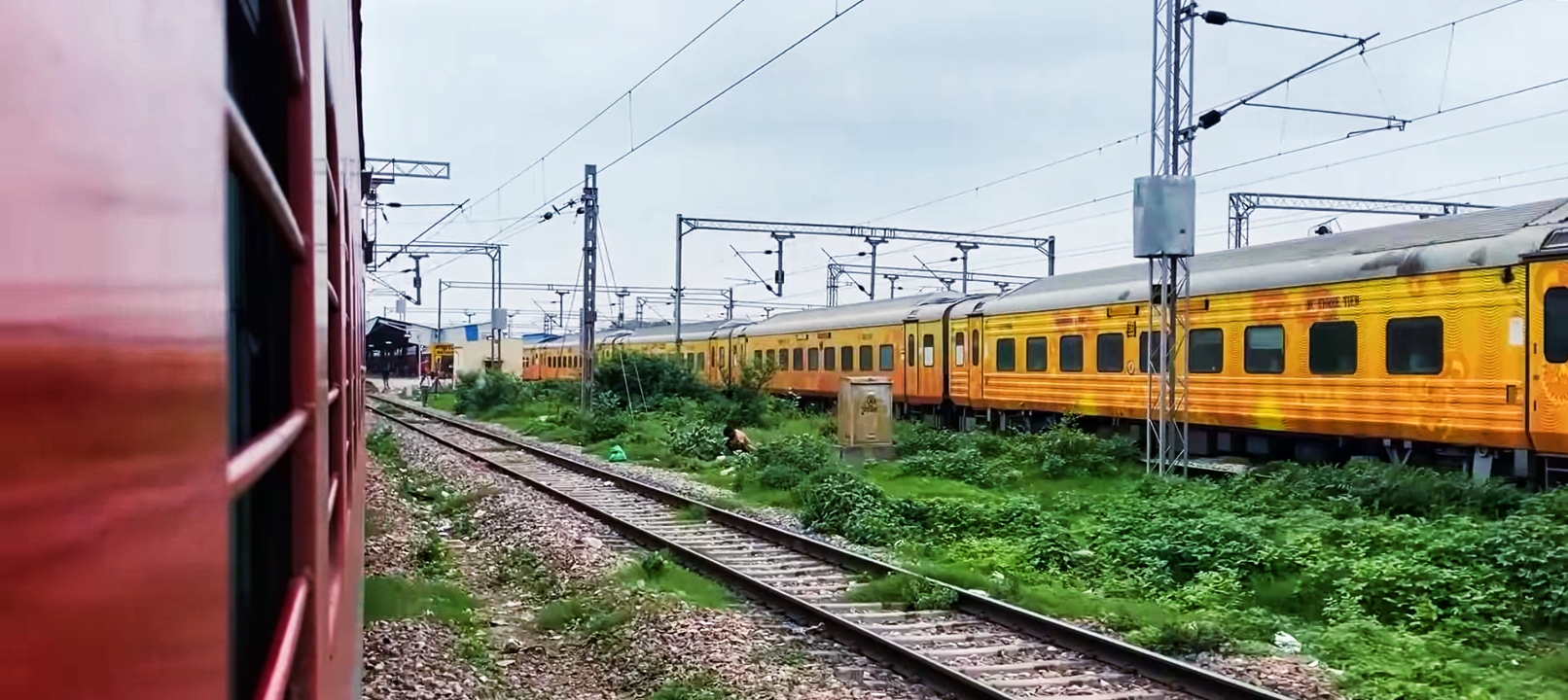
- August Kranti Rajdhani Express at Mathura Junction railway station

Overview
- Service type: Tejas Rajdhani Express
- Status: Active
- Locale: Maharashtra, Gujarat, Uttar Pradesh, Madhya Pradesh, Rajasthan, Haryana & Delhi
- First service: 1 January 1992; 34 years ago
- Current operator: Western Railway

Route
- Termini: Mumbai Central (MMCT); Hazrat Nizamuddin (NZM)
- Stops: 11
- Distance travelled: 1,378 km (856 mi)
- Average journey time: 16hrs 33mins
- Service frequency: Daily
- Train number: 12953 / 12954
- Lines used: Mumbai–Vadodara section; Vadodara–Mathura section; Mathura–New Delhi section (until Hazrat Nizamuddin)

On-board services
- Classes: AC First Class, AC 2 Tier, AC 3 Tier
- Seating arrangements: No
- Sleeping arrangements: Yes
- Catering facilities: Pantry car, On-board catering, E-catering
- Observation facilities: Large windows
- Baggage facilities: Below the seats
- Other facilities: Below the seats

Technical
- Rolling stock: LHB Tejas
- Track gauge: 1,676 mm (5 ft 6 in)
- Operating speed: 130 km/h (81 mph) maximum speed, 82 km/h (51 mph) average including halts.
Route map
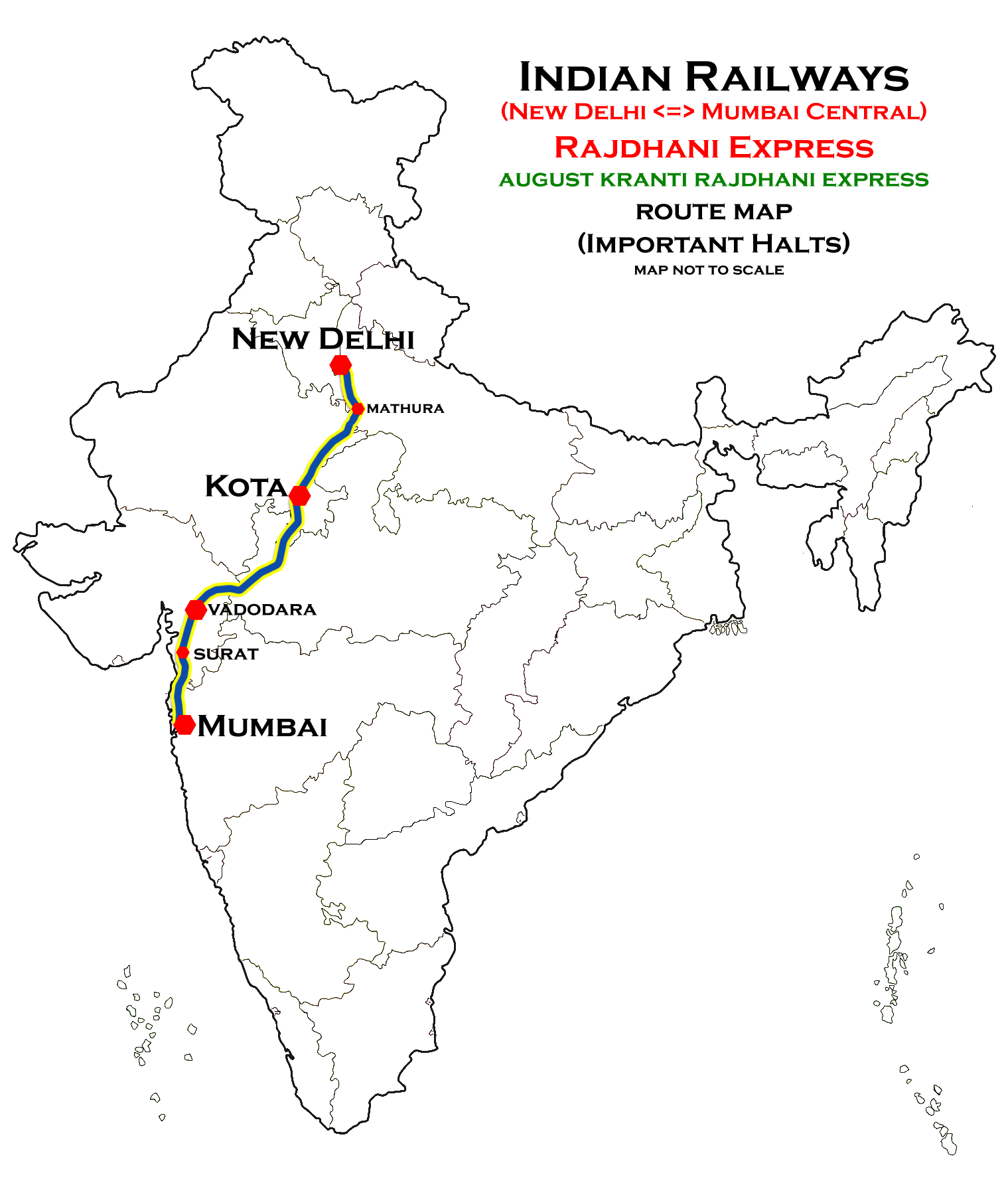
↓ 12954 • 12953 ↑

The 12953 / 12954 August Kranti Tejas Rajdhani Express is a Rajdhani class train of Indian Railways, which connects Mumbai Central in Mumbai, Maharashtra, with Hazrat Nizamuddin in Delhi, the national capital of India. It is named in honor of August Kranti Maidan (formerly known as the Gowalia Tank Maidan), where the Quit India Movement was launched on 8 August 1942. August Kranti Tejas Rajdhani Express is the second fastest train between Mumbai Central and Hazrat Nizamuddin, covering the 1,378 km in 16.5 hours.

== History ==
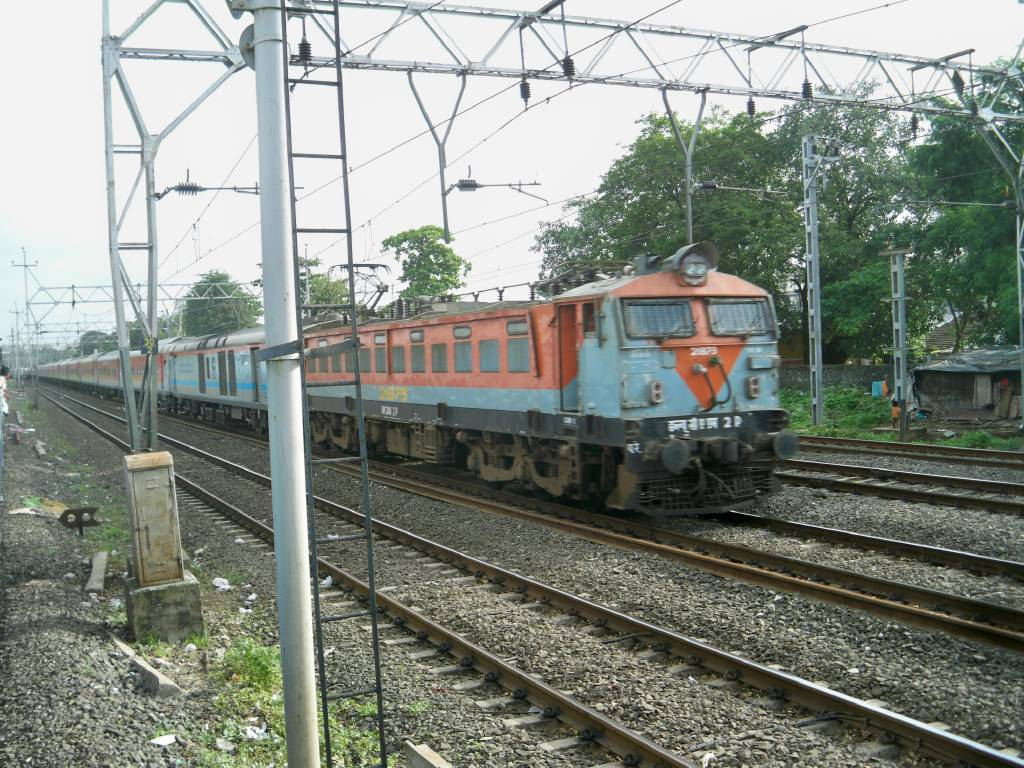
August Kranti Rajdhani Express bound to Delhi, hauled by WCAM-2P, near Borivali

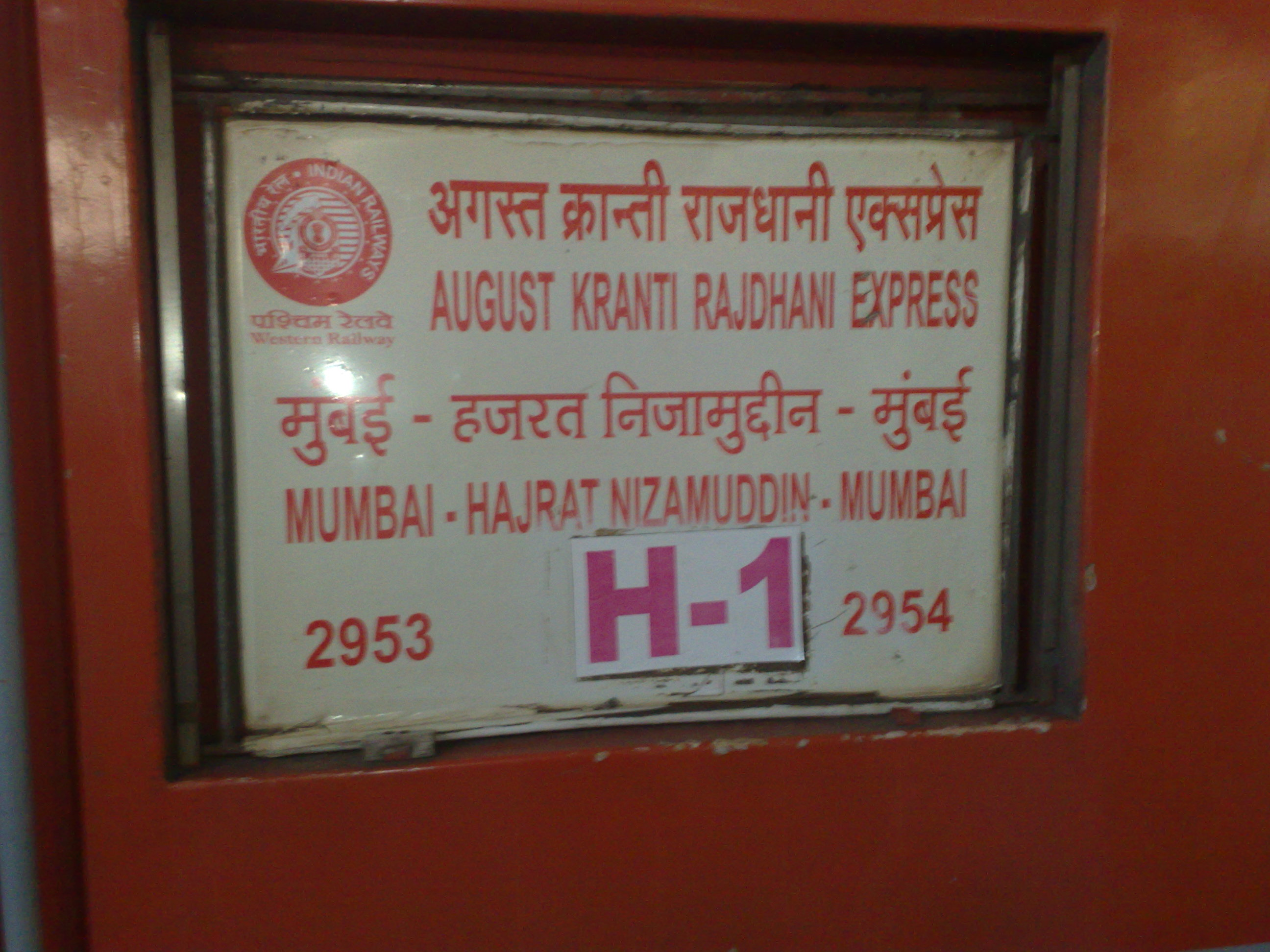
Trainboard of August Kranti Rajdhani Express

The Rajdhani Express service between Bombay Central (now Mumbai Central) and New Delhi was inaugurated on May 17, 1972, following the success of the Howrah – New Delhi Rajdhani Express in 1969. This train quickly gained immense popularity and success among passengers traveling to Bombay at the time. As a result, in response to the overwhelming demand for enhanced rail connectivity and more frequent services on this route, Indian Railways introduced a tri-weekly AC Express service between Bombay and New Delhi on July 1, 1991. While covering the same route as the Bombay Rajdhani, this service featured an additional 45 minutes of travel time to accommodate more stops and cater to increased passenger traffic. Hence, recognizing the need to streamline services and meet growing demands for additional Rajdhani Express routes, Indian Railways reintroduced the Bombay – New Delhi AC Express as trains 2953 / 2954, as the August Kranti Rajdhani Express on January 1, 1992.

In 1993, responding to rising passenger footfall and demand, the frequency of the August Kranti Rajdhani Express was increased from thrice weekly to daily, matching the schedule of the Bombay Rajdhani. By 2004, the August Kranti Rajdhani Express was upgraded from maroon-themed ICF coaches to modern LHB coaches. In 2010, Indian Railways embarked on an experimental project to enhance speed capabilities, increasing the maximum permissible speed of the Bombay Rajdhani and August Kranti Rajdhani to 140 km/h between Ballabgarh and Palwal. However, subsequent upgrades on the Mumbai – Delhi route led to a reversion of the maximum speed to 130 km/h.

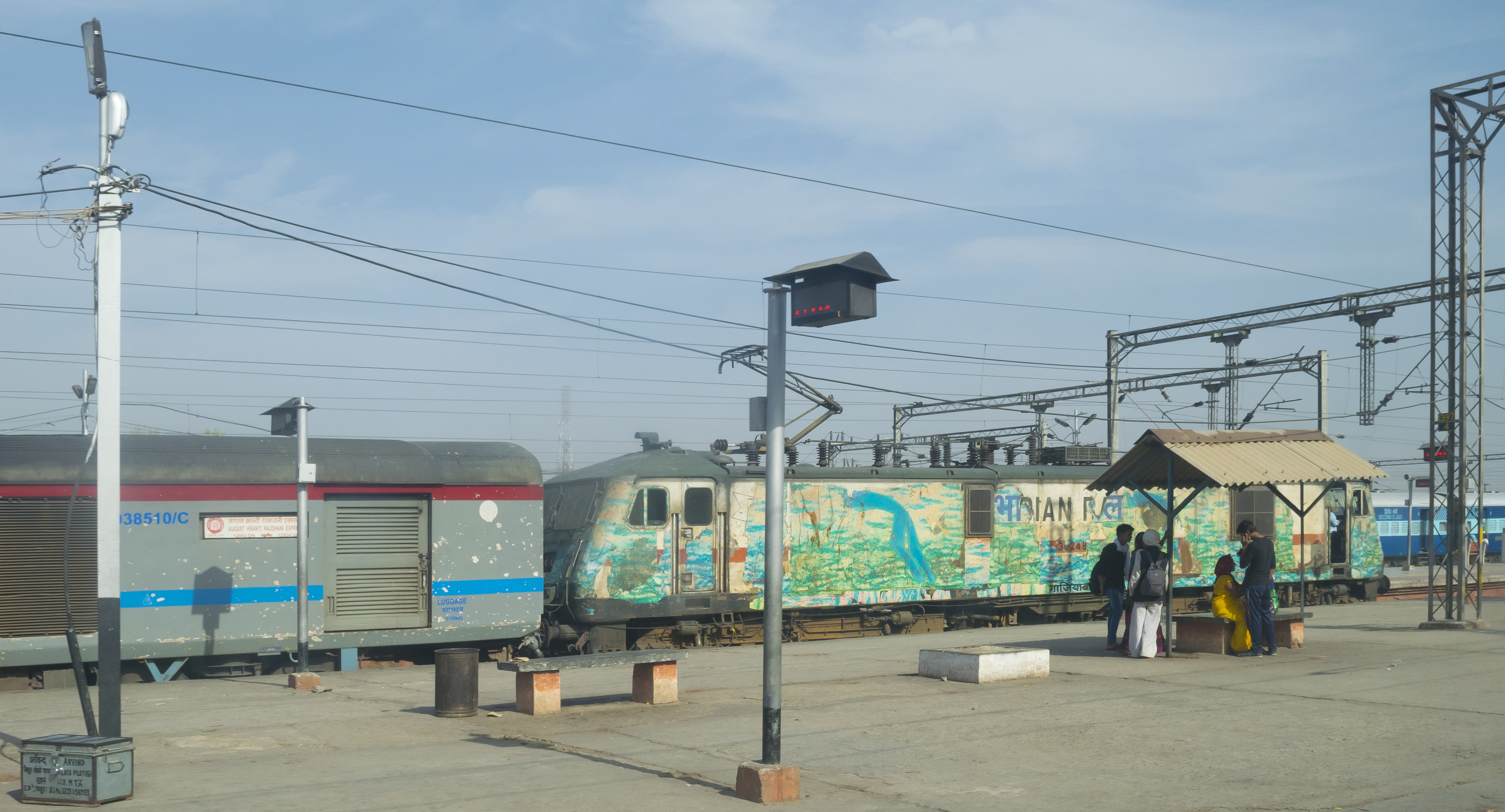
August Kranti Rajdhani Express bound to Delhi, departing from Mathura Junction

On December 12, 2021, as part of its ongoing upgrade program for Rajdhani Express trains, the Railway Board approved the modernization of the August Kranti Rajdhani Express's conventional LHB coaches with state-of-the-art Tejas rakes. Consequently, the train was renamed the August Kranti Tejas Rajdhani Express.

== Operations and timings ==
The August Kranti Rajdhani Express is operated and maintained by the Western Railway (WR) zone of Indian Railways. The 12953 August Kranti Rajdhani Express bound to Hazrat Nizamuddin in Delhi departs from Mumbai Central at 17:10 hrs and arrives in Hazrat Nizamuddin the next day at 09:43 hrs. The train covers the distance of 1,378 km in 16 hrs 33 min, with an average speed of 83 km/h and a maximum permissible speed of 130 km/h. In its return trip, the 12954 August Kranti Rajdhani Express bound to Mumbai, departs from Hazrat Nizamuddin at 17:15 hrs and arrives in Mumbai Central on the subsequent day at 10:05 hrs. This train covers the same distance in 16 hrs 50 min, with an average speed of 82 km/h and a maximum permissible speed of 130 km/h.

== Route and halts ==
- Mumbai Central
- Borivali
- Vapi
- Valsad
- Surat
- Bharuch Junction
- Vadodara Junction
- Dahod
- Ratlam Junction
- Kota Junction
- Sawai Madhopur
- Mathura
- Hazrat Nizamuddin

== Coach composition ==
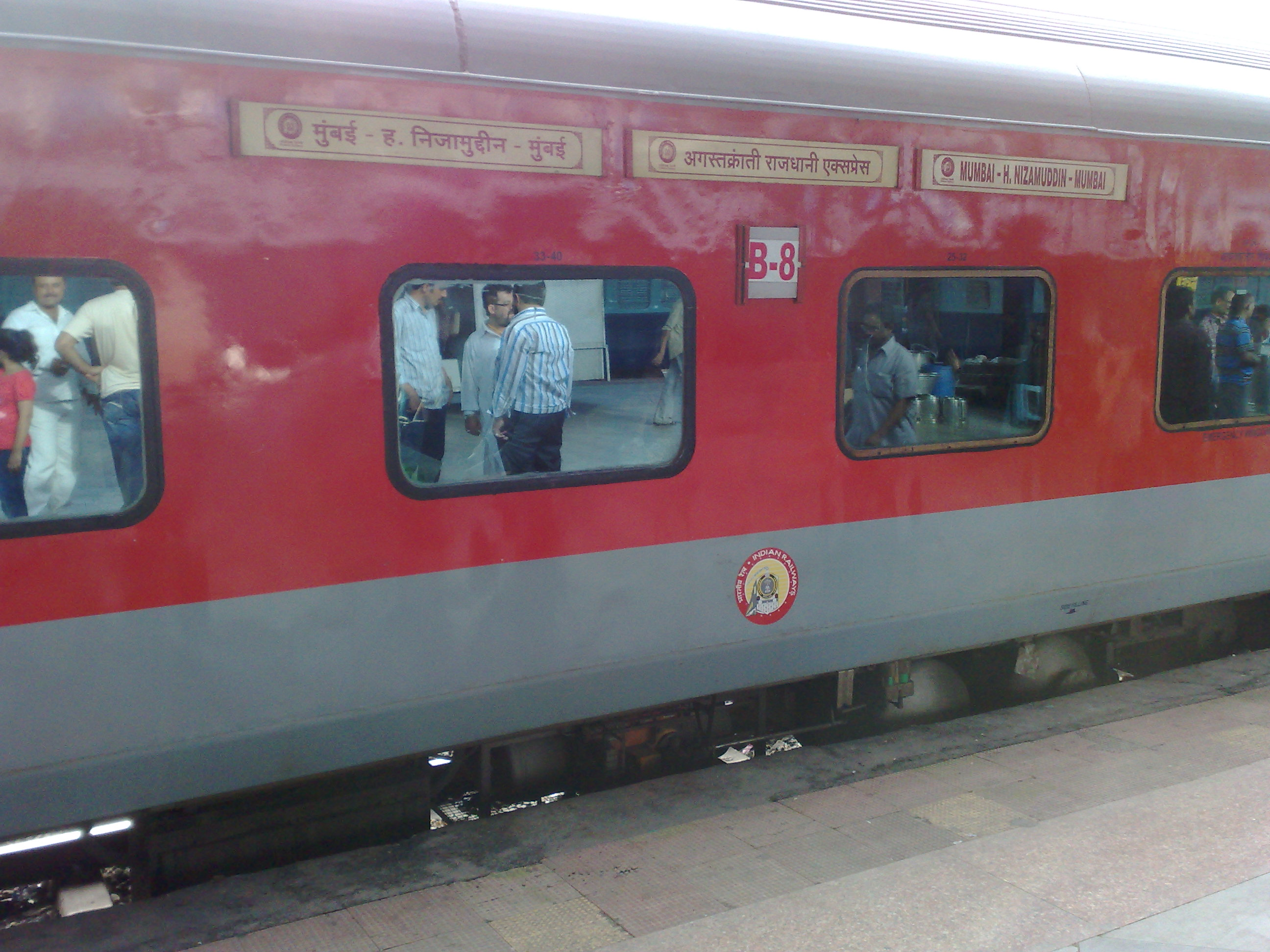
An AC-3 Tier coach (marked B8) of August Kranti Rajdhani Express

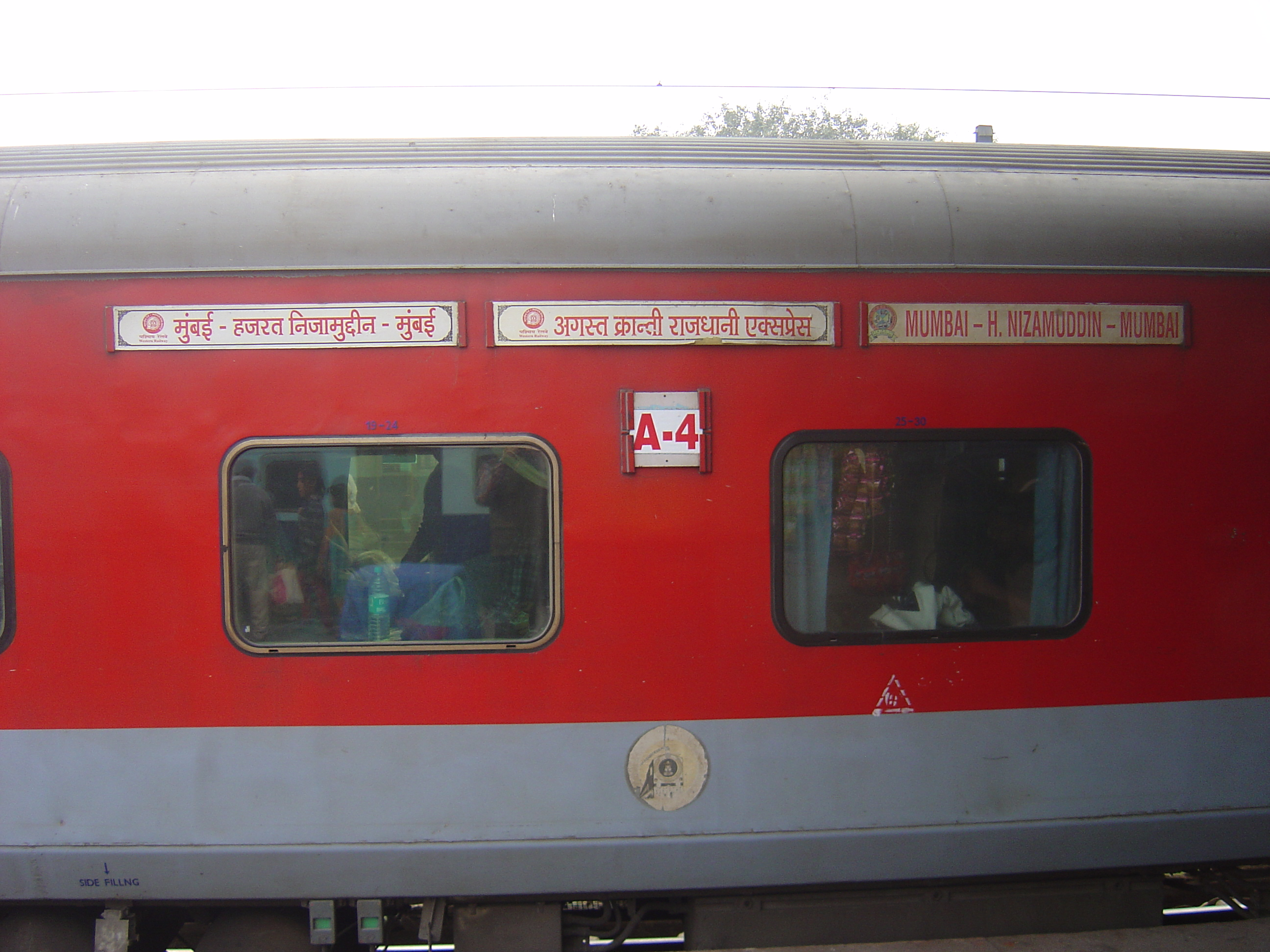
An AC-2 Tier coach (marked A4) of August Kranti Rajdhani Express

The train is equipped with the modern LHB Tejas coaches. It consists of 11 AC Three Tier coaches (B1 to B11), five AC Two Tier coaches (A1 to A5), one AC First Class coach (H1), one pantry cum hot buffet car (PC) and two End on Generation (EOG)/ Power cars. The train shares its rakes with the 12951 / 12952 Mumbai Central - New Delhi Tejas Rajdhani Express.

== Traction ==
Both trains are hauled by a Vadodara Loco Shed or Valsad Loco Shed based WAP-7 locomotive on its entire journey.
