= Valsad =

City in Gujarat, India

Valsad Bulsar
- City
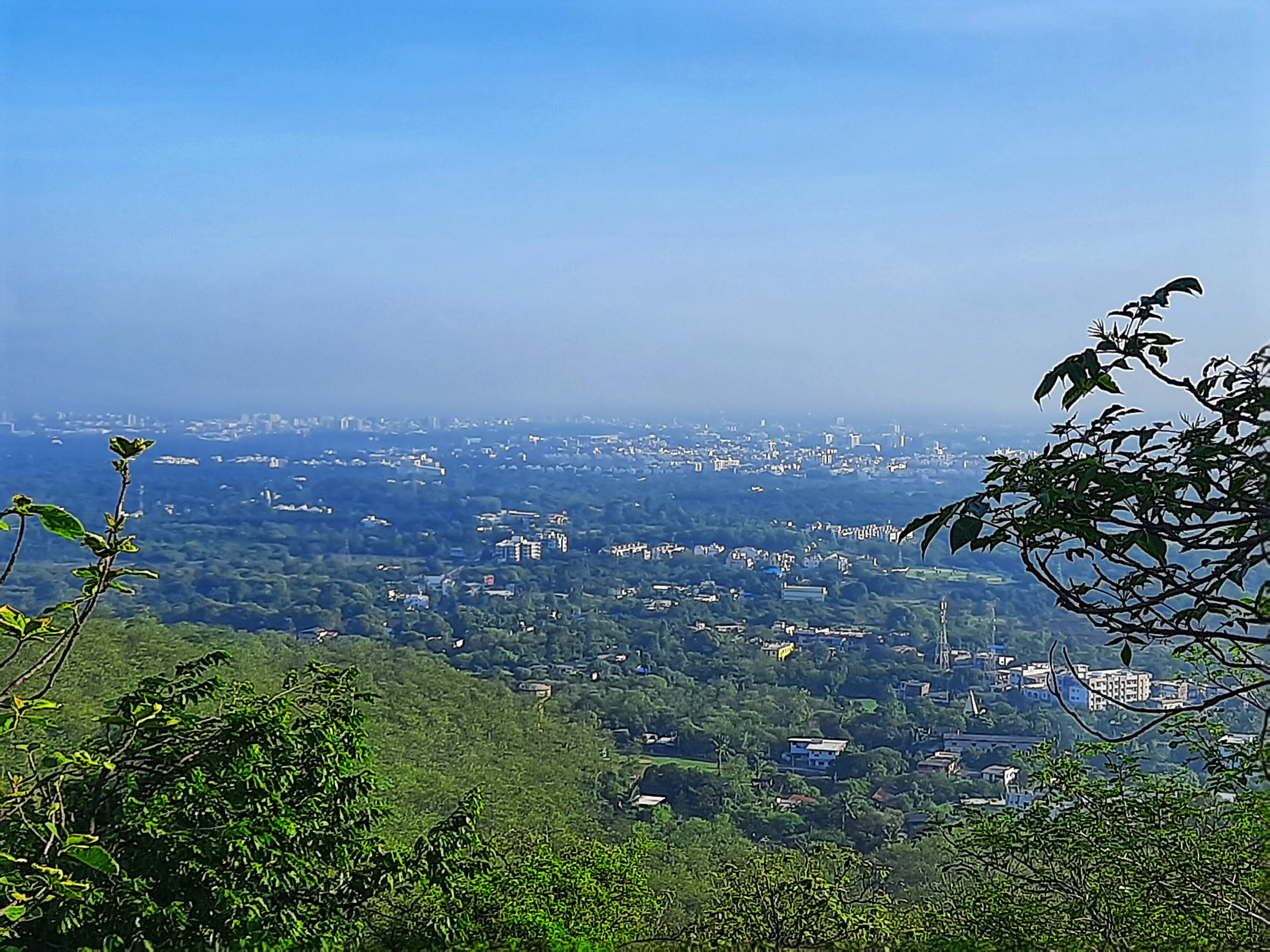
- Valsad City View from Parnera Hill

- Location within Gujarat Location within India Location within Asia
- Coordinates: 20.610°N 72.926°E
- Country: India
- State: Gujarat
- District: Valsad

Area
  - Total: 24.10 km^{2} (9.31 sq mi)
- Elevation: 13 m (43 ft)

Population (2011)
  - Total: 170,060
  - Density: 7,056/km^{2} (18,280/sq mi)
- Demonym(s): Valsadians, Valsadis

Languages
  - Official: Gujarati
- Time zone: UTC+5:30 (IST)
- PIN: 396001
- Telephone code: 91263
- Vehicle registration: GJ-15
- Sex ratio: 1000/1000 ♂/♀
- Literacy: 91 %

Valsad (Pronunciation: [ʋalsɑɖ]), anglicised as Bulsar, is a town and municipality in the Valsad district of the Indian state of Gujarat. It is the district headquarters of Valsad district. Valsad is located north of Vapi and shares borders with Maharashtra and the union territories of Daman in the south. Valsad is known for its historical Parsi community.

== Etymology ==
The name "Valsad" derives from vad-saal, a Gujarati language compound meaning "covered (sal) by banyan trees (vad)" or "where vad (banyan trees) and sal (sal tree) are" (the area was naturally rich in banyan trees). During the British Era, it was historically known as "Bulsar".

== Geography ==
Valsad is located at 20.63°N 72.93°E. It has an average elevation of 13 metres (42 feet). The old city is about 4 km inland from the Arabian Sea.

Geography of Valsad City:
Average rainfall	2300 mm
Average temperature	26.9 °C
Seismic Zone	Zone III
Major rivers	Auranga, Wanki
Beaches	Tithal Beach

=== Climate ===
Valsad has a tropical savanna climate (Aw) with little to no rainfall from October to May and very heavy to extremely heavy rainfall from June to September when it is under the direct influence of the Arabian Sea branch of the South-west monsoon.

Climate data for Valsad, India (1991-2020, extremes 1974–2020)
Month	Jan	Feb	Mar	Apr	May	Jun	Jul	Aug	Sep	Oct	Nov	Dec	Year
Record high °C (°F)	36.9 (98.4)	38.8 (101.8)	42.3 (108.1)	43.1 (109.6)	41.9 (107.4)	38.1 (100.6)	36.8 (98.2)	33.4 (92.1)	36.4 (97.5)	38.9 (102.0)	38.1 (100.6)	36.7 (98.1)	43.1 (109.6)
Mean daily maximum °C (°F)	30.5 (86.9)	30.8 (87.4)	34.2 (93.6)	35.2 (95.4)	34.5 (94.1)	33.0 (91.4)	30.4 (86.7)	29.9 (85.8)	30.9 (87.6)	33.8 (92.8)	33.2 (91.8)	32.2 (90.0)	32.4 (90.3)
Mean daily minimum °C (°F)	13.7 (56.7)	15.4 (59.7)	18.6 (65.5)	22.3 (72.1)	25.3 (77.5)	25.2 (77.4)	24.1 (75.4)	23.7 (74.7)	23.1 (73.6)	21.8 (71.2)	18.4 (65.1)	15.0 (59.0)	20.6 (69.1)
Record low °C (°F)	7.1 (44.8)	5.6 (42.1)	10.1 (50.2)	16.1 (61.0)	19.8 (67.6)	17.0 (62.6)	16.8 (62.2)	15.6 (60.1)	16.8 (62.2)	12.6 (54.7)	10.4 (50.7)	7.0 (44.6)	5.6 (42.1)
Average rainfall mm (inches)	0.4 (0.02)	0.0 (0.0)	0.7 (0.03)	0.0 (0.0)	0.7 (0.03)	322.8 (12.71)	665.0 (26.18)	442.8 (17.43)	279.9 (11.02)	26.9 (1.06)	6.3 (0.25)	5.9 (0.23)	1,751.4 (68.95)
Average rainy days	0.1	0.0	0.0	0.0	0.2	8.6	17.4	16.7	10.1	1.2	0.2	0.2	54.7
Average relative humidity (%) (at 17:30 IST)	51	50	48	58	66	74	82	83	79	65	54	54	64
Source: India Meteorological Department

== Demographics ==
Religions in Valsad city
Religion	Percent
Hindus	85.04%
Muslims	10.31%
Jains	2.55%
Christians	1.24%
Others†	0.8%
Distribution of religions †Includes Sikhs (0.2%), Buddhists (0.11%).

As of the 2011 India census, Valsad (metropolitan area) has a population of 170,060. Males constitute 51% of the population and females 49%. Valsad has an average literacy rate of 91.66%, higher than the national average of 74.04%. Male literacy is 94.62%, and female literacy is 88.58%.

The major language spoken is Gujarati. Other languages spoken are Hindi, Marathi and English.

The major religion followed in Valsad is Hinduism. Other religions followed are Islam, Christianity, Jainism, Zoroastrianism and Buddhism. The town was once a hub for Parsis.

== Transport ==
=== Road transport ===
Valsad lies on NH 48 and is connected to many cities in Gujarat and neighbouring states by the Gujarat State Road Transport Corporation bus service.

=== Railways ===
Valsad railway station is managed by the Mumbai WR railway division of the Western Railway and it is a Sub-Division under Western Railway. It lies on the New Delhi–Mumbai main line. The present railway station building was established in 1925. Adjacent to the railway station is the Valsad Electric Loco Shed which houses over 100 electric locomotives.

=== Airport ===
Valsad is close to NaMo Airport, Daman which is 27 km south of the city and Chhatrapati Shivaji Maharaj International Airport, Mumbai which is 188.3 km south of the city.

== Economy ==
Valsad is an industrial base for sectors such as chemicals, textiles, and paper & pulp industries. Since the 1980s, textile and chemicals have been the major sectors of investments and employment in the district. Valsad is emerging as a horticulture hub of the state, witnessing significant production in food grains and crops.

Valsad has 7 industrial estates located in Dungra, Pardi, Dharampur, Bhilad, Valsad, Umbergaon, Sarigam, Vapi (the chemical hub of Gujarat) and 1 Industrial park in Kalgam. With over 300 medium and large scale industries, Vapi is a major industrial center in Valsad. One of Asia's largest Common Effluent Treatment Plant (CETP) is present in Vapi, owned by Vapi Waste & Effluent Management Company and promoted by Vapi Industrial Association.

== Education ==
=== Colleges ===
- GMERS Medical College, est 2014
- Government Engineering College (affiliated to Gujarat Technological University), est 2004
- Government Polytechnic (affiliated to Gujarat Technological University), est 1965
- Smt. J.P. Shroff Arts College
- Shah N.H. Commerce College
- Dhiru-Sarla Institute of Management and Commerce
- B.K.M. Science College
- Dolat-Usha Institute of Applied Sciences
- Shree N. K. M. Nursing Instuite
- Shah K.M. Law College

=== Schools ===
Affiliated with ICSE

- Atul Vidyalaya School

Affiliated with the CBSE

- Saraswati International School
- Shree Vallabh Ashram's MGM Amin & V N Savani International School
- Shree Vallabh Sanskar Dham's Smt. Shobhaben Pratapbhai Patel Day Boarding School
- Shree Vallabh Ashram's MCM Kothari Girl's Residential School
- Vedaant Multipurpose School
- Western Railway English Medium Secondary School

Affiliated with the GSHSEB

- D.M.D.G. Municipal High School
- Jamnabai Sarvajanik Kanya Vidyalaya
- Maniba Sarvajanik Vidyalaya
- Shah Khimchand Mulji Sarvajanik High School
- St. Joseph's English Teaching High School
- Mother Mary Public High school.
- Bai Ava Bai High School
- BAPS Swaminarayan Vidhyamandir
- G.V.D. Sarvajanik High School
- Sett Rustomjee Jamsetjee Jejeebhoy or Sett R.J.J High School
- R.M. & V.M. Desai Vidyalaya
- Swaminarayan High School
- Gayatri High School
- Kusum Vidyalaya
- C.B High school
- Shree Saraswati Vidyamandir School

== Places to visit ==
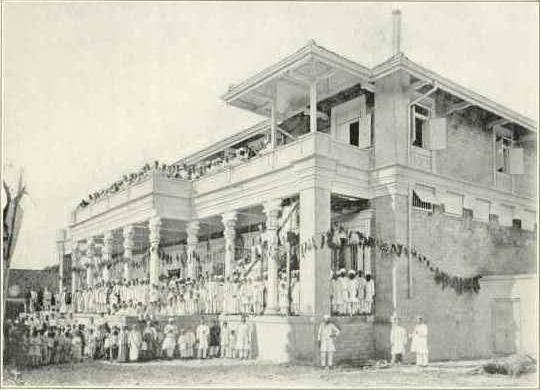
Udvada Agiyari

- Udvada, Valsad is the Primary, and Oldest Parsi Agiyari in India.

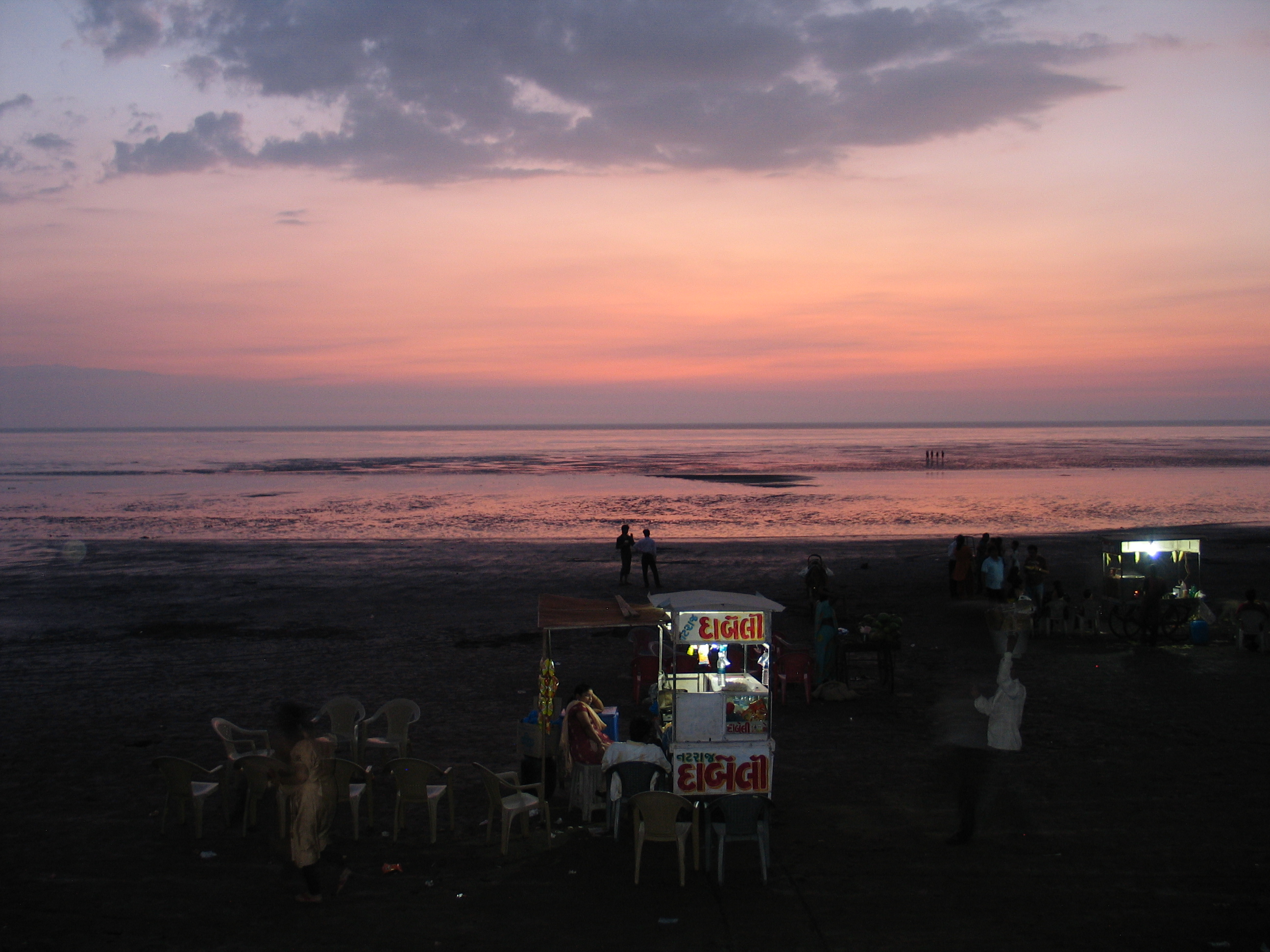
Tithal Beach

- Tithal Beach is located near Tithal town. The sand of the beach is black. Tithal Beach Festival and the International Kite Festival are also organised on the shore of the beach.
- Shree Shirdi Saibaba Sansthapan is located on the shore of the beach in Tithal town of Valsad district. The temple was established in 1982.

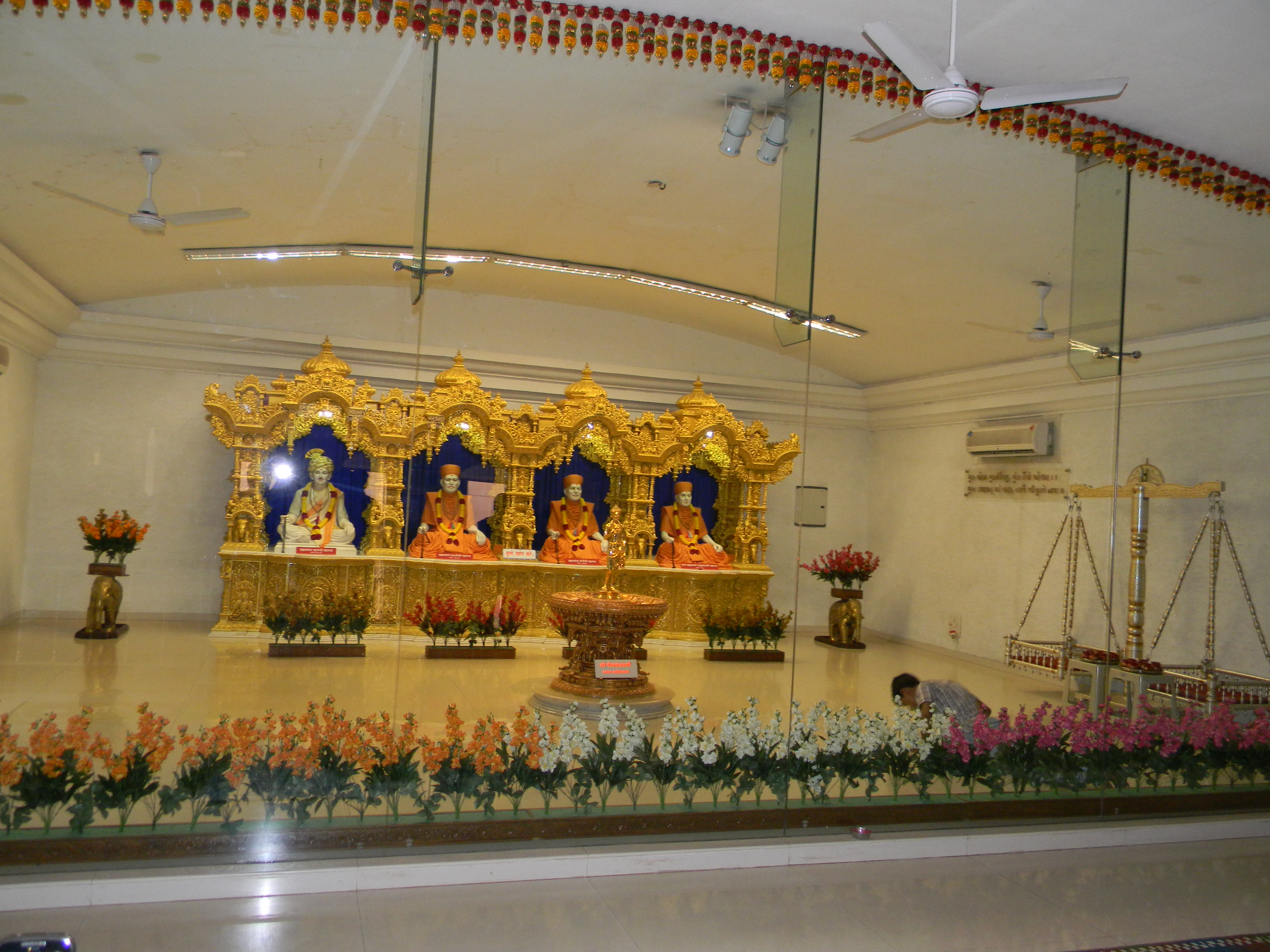
Swaminarayan Temple, Tithal

Shri Swaminarayan Mandir is located on the shore of the beach in Tithal town of Valsad district. This is a temple of Lord Swami Narayan.

- Shantidham Aradhana Kendra in Tithal is a meditation centre.

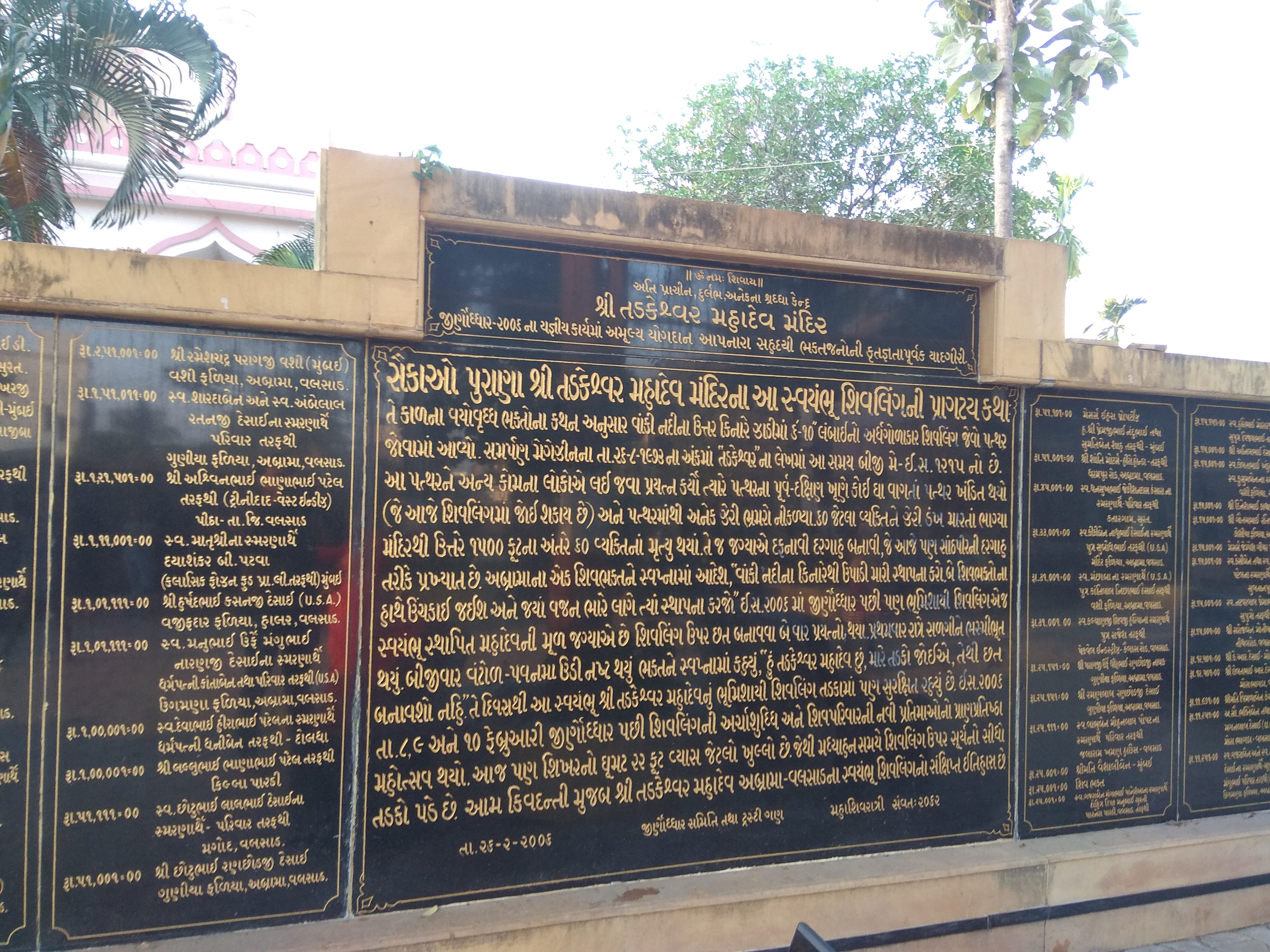
Tadkeshwar Mandir, Valsad.

- Tadkeshwar Mahadev Temple is the only Sleeping Shiv-ling in the World, located in Abrama and is believed to be more than 800 years old. It also has an open roof-top, which is intact since inauguration of the Mandir.

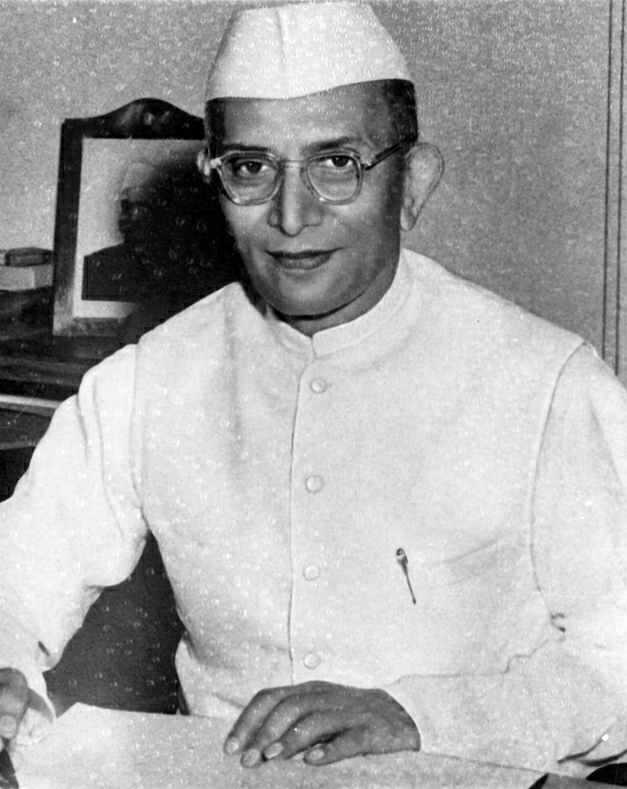
Morarji Desai

- Morarji Desai Museum dedicated to the 5th Prime Minister of India, Morarji Desai is in Valsad. The museum was inaugurated by the former Chief Minister of Gujarat, Anandiben Patel.
- Callian(Kalyan) Baug is an urban park in Valsad. In 1929, Mr. Motilal Callianji presented a donation for park to Valsad Municipality in memory of his father. In 1931, Callian Baug was opened by J.H.Garrett.

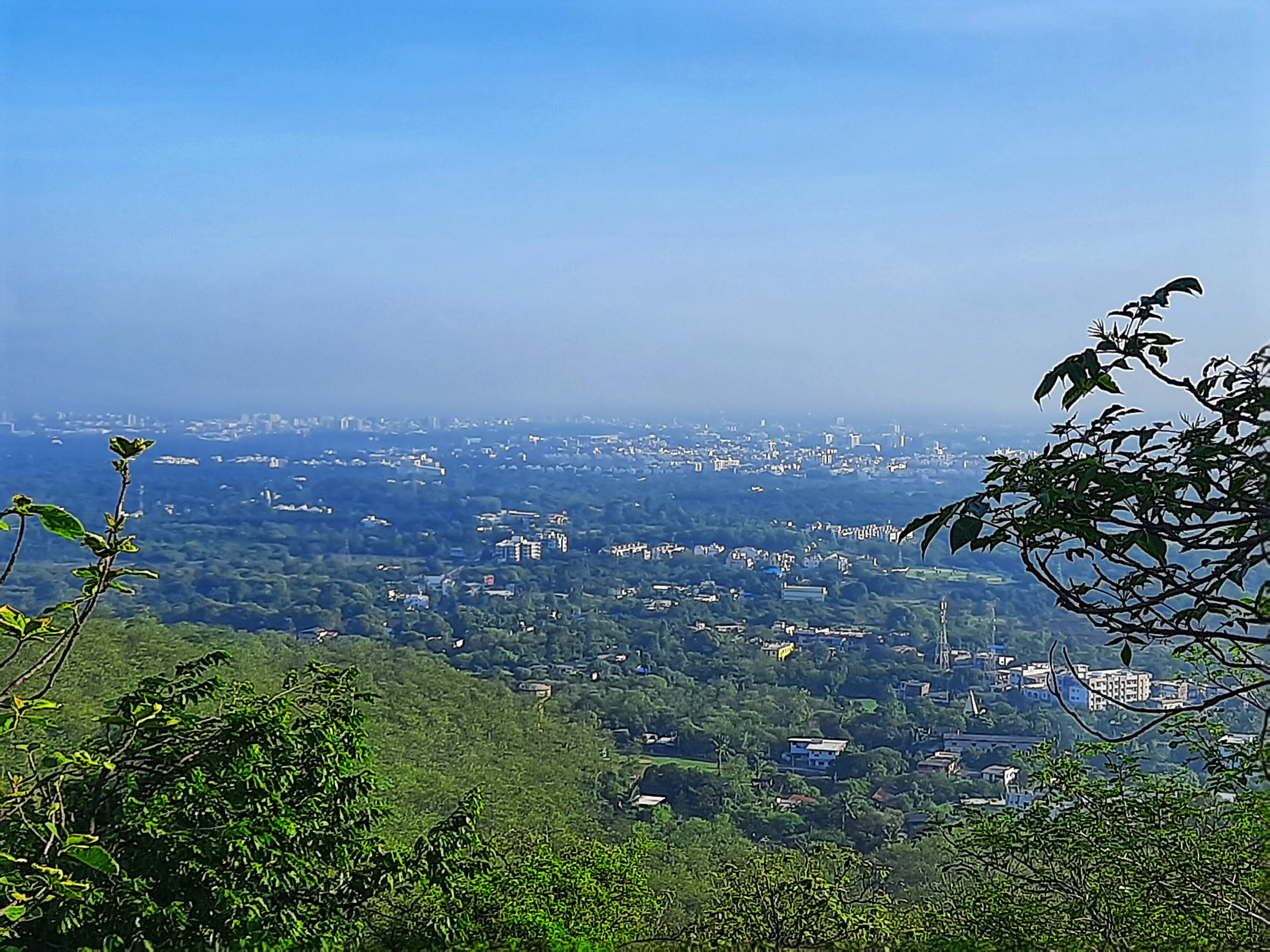
Parnera Mandir Hill View.

- Parnera Hill, also called Parnera Dungar, is one of the pilgrimages within the city that offers great view of the city. It's located 6.5 kilometers away from the city center. This is a Temple of 3 Goddesses and a "Bhairav Temple" 900 steps from base level. Chhatrapati Shivaji jumped from this hilltop on his Horse when he was in Valsad.
- Valsad Ganpati Mandir's Murti (idol) was given by Peshwa Bajirao himself.
- Dharampur Science Planetaurium, and Science City.
- Dharampur Palace.

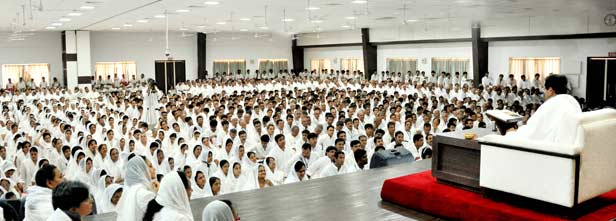
Rajchandra Mission, Dharampur

- Srimad Rajchandra Mission, Mohangadh, Dharampur, Valsad.

== Notable people ==
- Morarji Desai - former Prime Minister of India. Time Active Around 1930–1980
- Bhulabhai Desai - Indian freedom fighter and acclaimed lawyer. Time Active Around 1910–1946
- Sam Manekshaw - First Field Marshal of India and former chief of army staff, India. His family hailed from Valsad, later moved to Bombay and then Amritsar. Time Active Around 1932–1973
- Freddie Mercury (born Farrokh Bulsara) - singer and songwriter for the British rock band Queen, whose family originated from Valsad. Time Active Around 1964–1991
- Nirupa Roy - Hindi film actress. Time Active Around 1946–1990s
- Pratap Save - a social activist.
- Burjor Cawasji Pardiwala: Lawyer and Politician. Father of Justice J. B. Pardiwala.
- J. B. Pardiwala: Senior Judge at Supreme Court of India.
- Ranchhoddas Thakkar: Notable Lawyer, M.A.(Sanskrit), M.A.(English) from Wilson College, Mumbai, 1911.
- Shripad Damodar Satavlekar - Sanskrit Scholar and Author.
- Naresh Bhatt - Sanskrit Scholar, and author.
- Dr. Moghabhai Desai: Established College Campus in Valsad.
- Shri Siddharthbhai Lalbhai: Established College Campus in Valsad, and First Chemical Factory of Gujarat(Atul).
- Kanubhai Desai, MLA - Pardi Constituency and Cabinet Minister at Government of Gujarat.
- Dadabhoy Havewala - first-class cricketer, who played for Bombay cricket team and Parsees cricket team.
- Hemin Desai - Indian-born cricketer, who has represented Oman at the List A cricket.
- Makarand Dave (Nandigram) - Gujarati poet.
- Manilal Desai - Gujarati poet.
- Nagindas Parekh - literary critic, editor and translator.
- Nanubhai Vakil - a Hindi and Gujarati film director.
- Narayan Desai - Gujarati author.
- Pramodkumar Patel - literary critic.
- Ravindra Parekh - a writer, novelist, poet, critic and translator.
- Ushnas - Gujarati poet.
- Bindu Desai - Hindi film actress.
- Pooja Jhaveri - Telugu, Tamil and Kannada film actress.
- Sangeita Chauhan - Indian film and television actress.
- Sheela Sharma - Hindi and Gujarati film actress.
- Rex Sellers - a former Indian-Australian cricketer.
- Sam Balsara - Indian advertising executive.

== See also ==
- Bulsara
- Balsara
- Gulf of Khambhat
- Tithal Beach
- Vapi
- Navsari
- Khambhat
- Bharuch
- Morarji Desai
- Sam Manekshaw
