= Nanakvada =

Nanakwada
- Census town
- Location in Gujarat, India Nanakwada (India)
- Coordinates: 20°36′N 72°54′E
- Country: India
- State: Gujarat
- District: Valsad

Population (2001)
  - Total: 8,339

Languages
  - Official: Gujarati, Hindi
- Time zone: UTC+5:30 (IST)
- Postal code: 396001
- Vehicle registration: GJ
- Website: gujaratindia.com

Nanakwada is a census town in Valsad district in the Indian state of Gujarat. As Nanakwada is close to the district capital Valsad, it is an developed town with many residential apartments. It had three lakes out of which one has been transformed into Sai Niketan Society next to Nantional Association For the Blind School Valsad. Now it has two lakes, Dabhaliya talav and Khariya faliya talav ('talav' meaning lake in local language).

== Demographics ==
Religions in Nanakwada
Religion	Percent
Hindu	95.71%
Muslim	0.96%
Christian	1.63%
Sikh	0.26%
Buddhist	0.20%
Jain	0.78%
Others	0.28%
No religion	0.19%

As of 2001 India census, Nanakwada had a population of 8339. Males constitute 51% of the population and females 49%. Nanakvada has an average literacy rate of 84%, higher than the national average of 59.5%: male literacy is 87%, and female literacy is 80%. In Nanakwada, 9% of the population is under 6 years of age.
