= Arzan Nagwaswalla =

Indian cricketer

Personal information
- Full name: Arzan Rohinton Nagwaswalla
- Born: 17 October 1997 (age 29); Surat, Gujarat, India
- Batting: Right-handed
- Bowling: Left-arm fast-medium
- Role: Bowler

Domestic team information
- Years: Team
- 2018–present: Gujarat
- Source: ESPNcricinfo, 30 November 2021

Arzan Nagwaswalla (born 17 October 1997) is an Indian cricketer who represents Gujarat and West Zone. He made his List A debut for Gujarat in the 2017–18 Vijay Hazare Trophy on 11 February 2018. He made his first-class debut for Gujarat in the 2018–19 Ranji Trophy on 1 November 2018. He made his Twenty20 debut for Gujarat the 2018–19 Syed Mushtaq Ali Trophy on 25 February 2019.

In May 2021, he was named as one of four standby players in India's Test squad for the final of the 2019–2021 ICC World Test Championship and their away series against England. He was not selected in the playing eleven.

== Early life ==
Nagwaswalla was born to a Parsi family in Surat but grew up in Nargol, a village which is situated on the border of Maharashtra in Umbergoan town in Gujarat. He currently resides in Valsad. He was initially coached by his elder brother before he got the opportunity to play with a few Ranji Trophy players in his hometown and that helped him develop his skill and interest in the game.
