= Vapi INA =

- city
- Location in Gujarat, India Vapi INA (India)
- Coordinates: 20.37°N 72.91°E
- Country: India
- State: Gujarat
- District: Valsad

Population (2001)
  - Total: 23,845

Languages
  - Official: Gujarati, Hindi
- Time zone: UTC+5:30 (IST)
- Vehicle registration: GJ
- Website: gujaratindia.com

Vapi INA is a town (part of Vapi city) and an industrial notified area in Valsad district in the Indian state of Gujarat.

== Demographics ==
As of 2001 India census, Vapi INA had a population of 23,845. Males constitute 55% of the population and females 45%. Vapi INA has an average literacy rate of 81%, higher than the national average of 72%: male literacy is 83%, and female literacy is 77%. In Vapi INA, 13% of the population is under 6 years of age.
