= Chijgam =

- Village
- Location in Gujarat, India
- Coordinates: 20.9451°N 72.9344°E
- Country: India
- State: Gujarat
- District: Navsari
- Founder: chijgamvasi

Government
  - Type: BJP
- Elevation: 3 m (9.8 ft)

Population (2001)
  - Total: 4,000

Languages
  - Official: Gujarati, Hindi
- Time zone: UTC+5:30 (IST)
- PIN: 396460
- Website: www.chijgam.com

Chijgam is a village located on the coast of the Arabian Sea 160 miles north of Mumbai, India. The village of Dandi, which is famous for Mohandas Gandhi's 1930 Salt March, and the city of Navsari, which is the birthplace of the founders of TATA (India's largest business group), are located in close proximity of Chijgam. Despite limited resources in Chijgam, many residents of the tiny village become doctors, software engineers, chartered accountants, and the like. Former villagers now reside in the USA, Canada, UK, Kenya, Uganda, Zambia, South Africa, Dubai, Abu Dhabi and New Zealand.

== History ==
Chijgam was established around 1850 by Makanbhai Patel and few other families who migrated from Mutwaad. Chijgam and all of its neighboring villages were massive sea salt producing areas for almost 200 years. The area that Chijgam is located on is separated from the Arabian Sea by approximately one mile of land. It is located on Kanai Creek which starts from Toli Talav, north of Navsari and ends up at Arabian Sea.

Salt was mainly traded from the Chijgamis to the Banjaras/Vanzaras (gujrati pronunciation) (the gypsy tribe of traders) for money, materials, essentials, food, and jewelry. Eventually technology advanced, and ships were used to transport salt to Mumbai. Adoption of a railroad transportation system replaced Chijgami dependence on the Vanzaras and their camel fleets. Introduction of a fresh water canal system reduced the amount of salt in the sea (brine level) by 40%. The lack of salt eventually ended the salt business that Chijgam was accustomed to. However, canals were useful in rejuvenating farm crops and mango orchards. Despite the demise of the salt manufacturing business, the improvement of the land’s agriculture is why canals were still used. By 1975, opportunities in the diamond cutting and polishing businesses brought prosperity back to Chijgam. Meanwhile, people started to immigrate to Europe and North America. Today Canada and the Persian Gulf have one of the largest number of residents from Chijgam.

Dandi is the place where Gandhi concluded his Salt March in 1930. Chijgam is located 7–8 miles from Dandi and share the area of salt manufacturing farms with Dandi. Gandhi also visited Mutwaad, Abrama, Panaar while he stayed for one month before his arrest.

From the 1920s through the 1940s, several Chijgami residents flourished in the Toddy also known as Palm wine, (a semi-alcoholic drink made from the sap of Palm trees) producing and selling business. Toddy can also be distilled and it is known as arrack everywhere. These Chijgamis traveled as far as Nagpur to run such stores and during the festival of Diwali, would return to Chijgam with great wealth. However, before returning to Chijgam, many of the businessmen would hire musicians from neighboring villages and reenter Chijgam with great fanfare and excitement. They would also hire cooks and hold extravagant celebrations and feasts. Unfortunately for Chijgamis, during the 1930s when Gandhi started his support for liquor prohibition, Taadi stores went out of business. Some Chijgamis went into Shipping business using small clipper ships. They used to transport goods between Goa, Mumbai and Bhavnagar. Advent of trucking business through roads put these families out of shipping business through sea. Farmers have now turned to grow rice, sugarcanes, mangoes & sapodillas (chikoo)

Between 1930 through 1970, about 10% of children from Chijgam attended the only high school in the district: the Dahyabhai Sunderji & Bhagwanji Bhimbhai School in Khara Abrama. It is a commute of 8 miles from Chijgam to the DS&BB school. Lalbhai Patel started primary school around 1930's in Chijgam because kids had really hard time to go to Panaar which was only 3 miles commute but through muddy waterway.

During the late 60’s, Chijgamis became famous for playing Kabaddi and volleyball. Chijgam sent regularly Kabaddi and volleyball teams to compete at state level. During games, Chijgam’s musical themesong, "The Pride of Chijgam" was loudly played by local bands against rival bands during what became known as a musical face-off. The band with the loudest and clearest sound often won the battle.

Chijgamis used to commute 3–6 miles to Abrama & Panar, carrying 30–35 kg of dehusked rice over their heads to convert it into puffed rice & flattened rice.

== Religion and Beliefs ==
A majority of Chijgam's population ascends from the Koli tribe and worships the goddess Kali (Kalimata). Ten mile pilgrimages to the Kalimata temple, Masa, during the monsoon season were common journeys made by the Chijgamis. There is also the Wageshwarimata temple and a recently constructed Rama temple. When they inhabited Chijgam, Vanzaras frequented Rupamata and Makhanmata temples.

Kolis from Chijgaam who were also agris (salt gatherers) also pray to goddess Mumba. It is fact that Mumbai, the biggest city in India is named after goddess Mumba and Mumba Devi Mandir is one of the most popular temple in Mumbai. Chijgamis make pilgrim to Unnaimata (Oonaimata) temple and enjoy sulfur water spring bath at temple. Groups performing Ramlila was big entertainment for chijgaamis during early part of 20th century.
