= Valsad INA =

- city
- Location in Gujarat, India Valsad INA (India)
- Coordinates: 20.6333°N 72.9333°E
- Country: India
- State: Gujarat
- District: Valsad

Population (2001)
  - Total: 890

Languages
  - Official: Gujarati, Hindi
- Time zone: UTC+5:30 (IST)
- Vehicle registration: GJ
- Website: gujaratindia.com

Valsad INA is a town and an industrial notified area in Valsad district in the Indian state of Gujarat.

== Demographics ==
As of 2001 India census, Valsad INA had a population of 890. Males constitute 58% of the population and females 42%. Valsad INA has an average literacy rate of 83%, higher than the national average of 59.5%: male literacy is 84%, and female literacy is 82%. In Valsad INA, 10% of the population is under 6 years of age.
