= Umargam INA =

- city
- Location in Gujarat, India Umargam INA (India)
- Coordinates: 20.20°N 72.75°E
- Country: India
- State: Gujarat
- District: Valsad

Population (2001)
  - Total: 3,520

Languages
  - Official: Gujarati, Hindi
- Time zone: UTC+5:30 (IST)
- Pin Code: 396171
- Telephone code: 91-260-XXX-XXXX
- Vehicle registration: GJ-15
- Website: https://umargamuia.org

Umargam INA is a town and an industrial notified area in Valsad district in the Indian state of Gujarat.

== Demographics ==
As of 2001 India census, Umargam INA had a population of 3520. Males constitute 58% of the population and females 42%. Umargam INA has an average literacy rate of 83%, higher than the national average of 59.5%: male literacy is 86%, and female literacy is 78%. In Umargam INA, 11% of the population is under 6 years of age.
