= Nargol =

Town in Gujarat

- Town
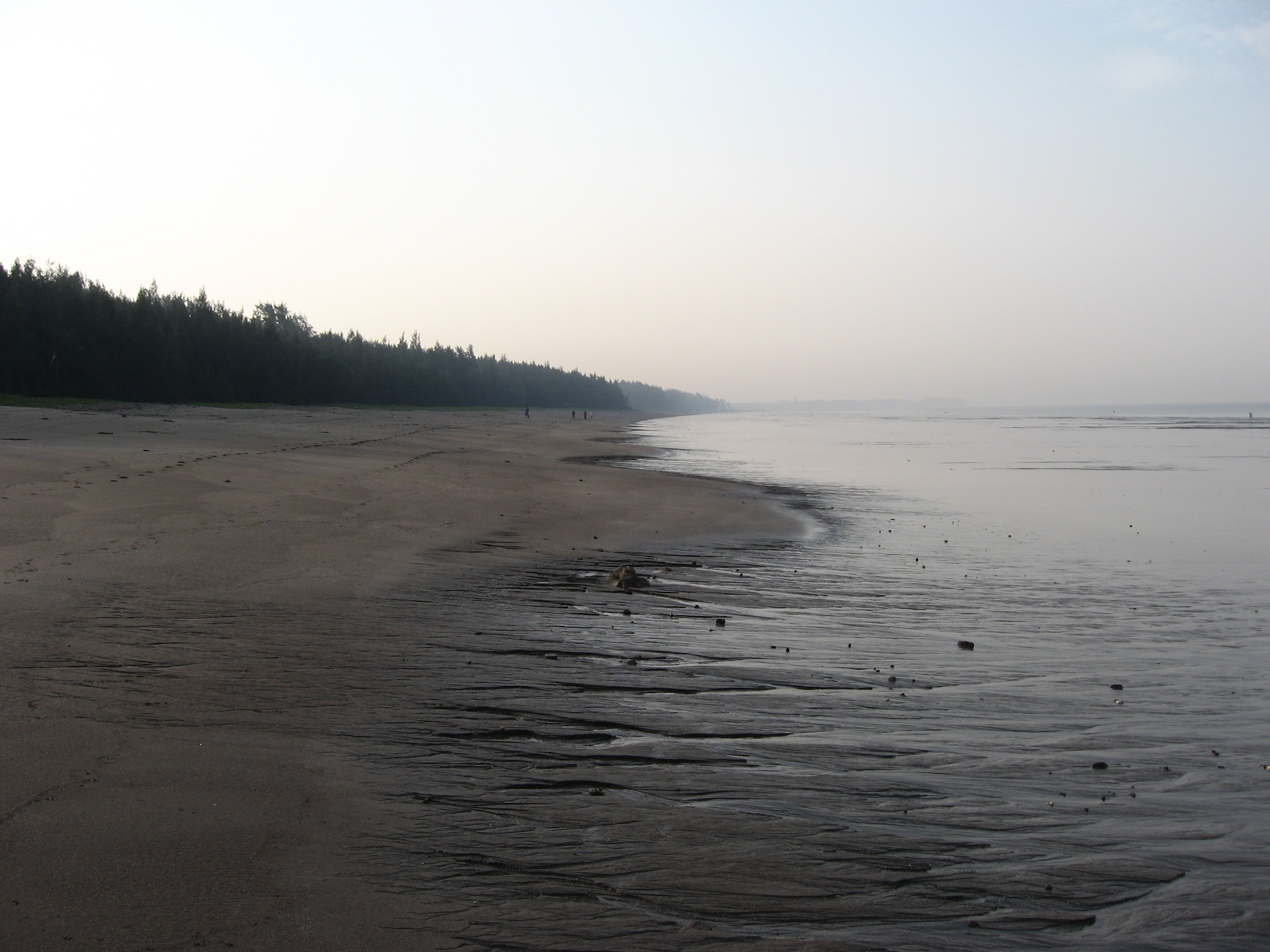
- Nargol Beach

- Location in Gujarat, India
- Coordinates: 20.233°N 72.750°E
- Country: India
- State: Gujarat
- District: Valsad
- Elevation: 5 m (16 ft)

Population (2001)
  - Total: 54,700

Languages
  - Official: Gujarati, Hindi
- Time zone: UTC+5:30 (IST)
- PIN: 396135
- Telephone code: 0260
- Vehicle registration: GJ-15

Nargol, also known as Nargole, is a village located in the Indian state of Gujarat. It is a local center of religion, home to one of the largest and oldest Parsi fire temples, and is also considered the location at which Sahaja Yoga began in 1970.

== Geography ==
Nargol is sited in Gujarat's southern region near the Maharashtra border. It lies about 150 kilometres (93 mi) north from Mumbai and around 400 kilometres (249 mi) from Ahmedabad on the Arabian Sea coast. The nearest town is Vapi, located about 25 kilometres (16 mi) away.

The Arabian Sea is to the West, Umargam to the south, separated by a river. To the southeast is Sanjan and to the North is Saronda.

The countryside surrounding Nargol is typical Indian countryside dotted with small farmhouses. Around Nargol water buffalos swim in the rivers or sparsely populated quiet landscapes of dry savannah. The beaches are sandy, wide and isolated with a relatively large tidal range and strong tidal currents.

Nargol beach is dotted with Casuarina trees and the waters have a population of sea turtles. The beach is not crowded and is rarely visited by locals. The seaside is part of the Gulf of Khambhat, and has cloudy water.

== History ==
Persians (Zoroastrians) first entered India by landing in Nargol, and soon spread north to nearby Sanjan. Nargol was historically the mecca of Parsi people in India, and where they held their Zoroastrian sacred flame. In 1903, Rustom Taleyarkhan, a collector of customs, persuaded prominent Parsi families such as the Tatas and the Wadia family to help set up institutions such as schools, institutes, a library, a town hall, and a hospital.

It continued to be prosperous until 1947, when an act passed that gave agricultural land to the tenants. This led a large swathe of the youth to leave town. The population has fallen from an estimated 2500-9000 Parsis at its height to just 55 in 1992. Many houses remain empty, and many traditional houses have since been replaced with modern concrete bungalows.

Nargol has experienced problems with water scarcity and salinity. The town also faced issues with pollution from an industrial pipeline, which residents claim has been causing sickness.

UNICEF worked to teach village leaders about issues concerning child survival and development.

Yatinbhai Bhandari was elected Sarpanch (head of the village) in 2007. Subsequently, in 2012, Jayesh G. Baria was elected sarpanch. In 2022, Bhandhari's wife Sweety Ben Yatinbhai Bhandari was elected Sarpanch.

Since 1997, the Gujarat government has sought to build a port in Nargol. In 2021, they sought bids for a second time. However, locals protested, claiming the port would "destroy their livelihood" by using land with fruit orchards and large amounts of marine life.

Nargol is slowly sinking due to rising sea levels.

== Economy ==
One of Nargol's core revenue sources is fishing. A majority of its citizens depend on fishing foods such as Bombay duck, prawn, lobster, and pomfret. Nargol also possesses fruit orchards.

== Marine geography ==
An ancient city 20–40 meters under the sea was reported in the year 2000. Thought to be over 9000 years old, it was discovered 20 kilometers off the coast in an area with numerous geometric formations. The 9 km long area forms the basis of marine archaeology in the Gulf of Cambay. Its status as a major archeological discovery is disputed and studies have yet to be completed. The area is very risky and difficult to excavate because of the water depth, strong currents and poor visibility.

== Transport ==
The nearest airports are Daman and Surat. The nearest railway station, Sanjan, is about 11 kilometers away from the village and provides train routes going to Mumbai in the south and Gujarat in the north.

== Sports ==
Nargol is known as a good destination for sports including jetskiing, parasailing, and speedboating.

== Education ==
Nargol has 7 schools. Five are for youth: Dakshina Vidalaya (established 2014, grades 1 to 5), Navatadav Pra. Shala (established 1928, grades 1 to 5), Shala Saronda (established 1867, grades 1 to 8), Gujarati Pra. Mukhya Shala (established 1983, grades 1 to 8), and Pra. Shala Nargol-Machhiwad (established 1918, grades 1 to 8). Two are high schools: N. M. Wadia Tata-Wadia High School Nargol and Bhakta Shree Jalaram New High School.

== Religious activities ==
The town is known for its Parsi (Zoroastrian) population. Legends tell that Zoroastrians first came to India from Nargol in the 7th century.

Near the beach is the oldest of the Parsi agiaries, which is a popular pilgrimage site. The village also possesses a Parsi Association Guest House.

Nargol has great importance for the followers of Sahaja Yoga. One of the Casuarina tree (or Saru tree) located near the beach is known as the "Nirmal Tree" ("Nirmal Wriksh"). In 1970, Shri Mataji Nirmala Devi was said to open the Sahasrara chakra under that tree, thus marking the beginning of Sahaja Yoga. The forest land surrounding the "Nirmal Tree" was declared the "Nirmal Van" ("Pure Forest") in an official ceremony on 2 March 2009 by representatives of the Indian government and other state authorities.

Nargol also has the Sri Auromira International School (SAIS), a base for the followers of Sri Aurobindo. SAIS was a boarding school with ideals of finding the learning potential of each and every child in a perfect harmonious environment with Aurobindo's spiritual teachings in mind. It has been under renovation, however.

Bhagwan Shree Rajneesh (Osho) also held meditations in Nargol in 1970, where he investigated new techniques.

There is also a Shree Swaminarayan temple located in Nargol.

== Notable Residents ==
- Arzan Nagwaswalla, cricketer
