= Mogravadi =

- Census town
- Location in Gujarat, India Mogravadi (India)
- Coordinates: 20°36′35″N 72°55′28″E
- Country: India
- State: Gujarat
- District: Valsad

Population (2001)
  - Total: 17,520

Languages
  - Official: Gujarati, Hindi
- Time zone: UTC+5:30 (IST)
- Vehicle registration: GJ
- Website: gujaratindia.com

Mogravadi is a census town in Valsad district in the Indian state of Gujarat.

== Demographics ==
As of 2001 India census, Mogravadi had a population of 17,520. Males constitute 53% of the population and females 47%. Mogravadi has an average literacy rate of 78%, higher than the national average of 59.5%: male literacy is 83%, and female literacy is 71%. In Mogravadi, 12% of the population is under 6 years of age.
