= Tadkeshwar Mahadev Temple =

Hindu temple in Valsad, Gujarat, India

- Location in India

Religion
- Affiliation: Hinduism
- Deity: Shiva

Location
- Location: Abrama, Valsad district, Gujarat
- Country: India
- Interactive map of Tadkeshwar Mahadev Temple
- Coordinates: 20°35′24″N 72°56′12″E

Architecture
- Completed: More than 800 years

Tadkeshwar Mahadev temple is a Hindu temple. It is located near Abrama town in Valsad district of the Indian state of Gujarat. The temple is on the bank of the Wanki river.

The temple is more than 800 years old, one of the oldest in Valsad District. It was designed to allow the sun to shine on the Shivlinga inside and has no ceiling. Therefore, it is known as "Tadkeshwar". The length of the Shivlinga is approximately 6 to 8 ft.

On the occasions of the Maha Shivaratri festival and Shravan Month, a fair take place nearby.

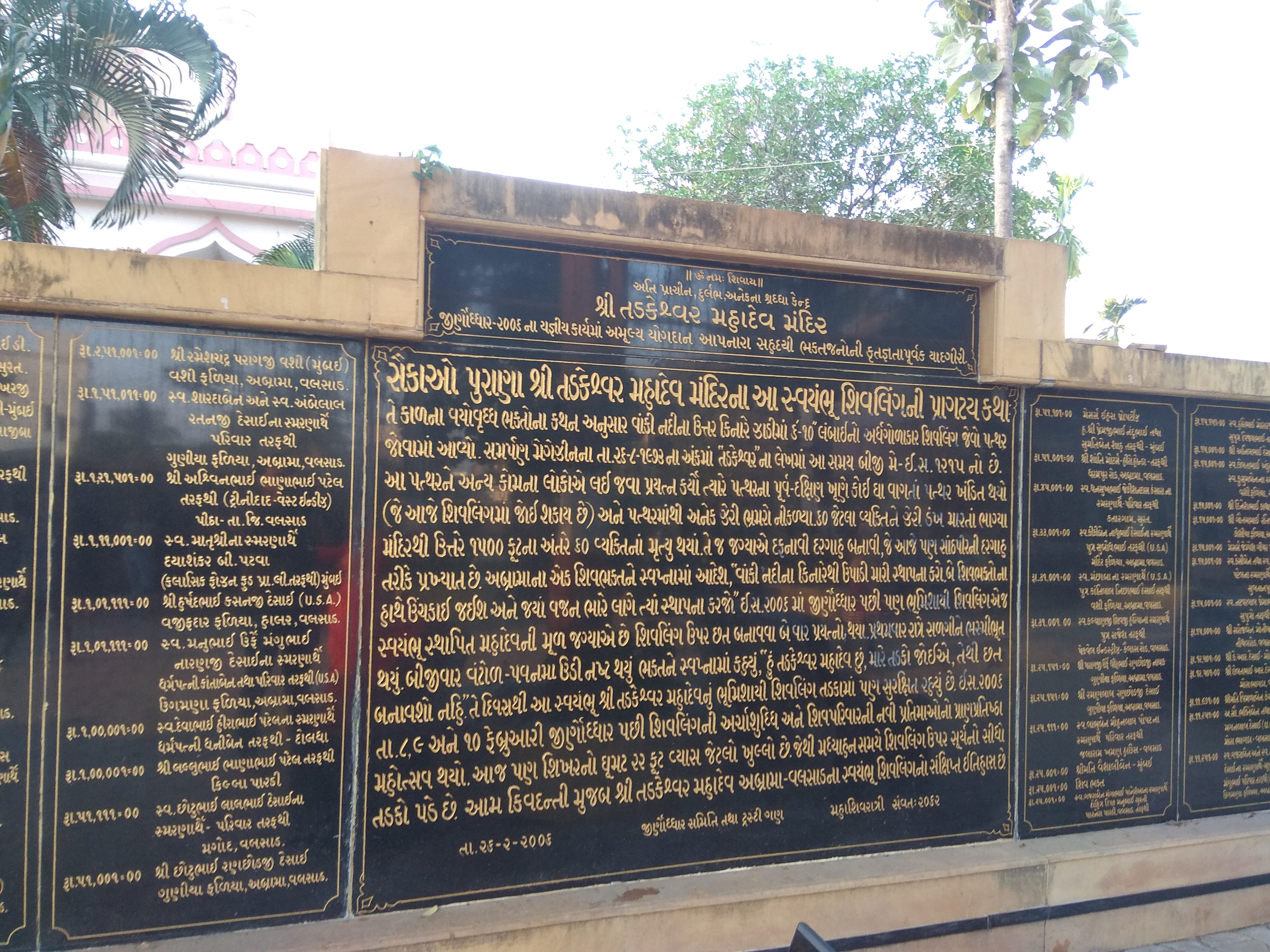
History of Tadkeshwar Mahadev Temple, Valsad

== History ==
A 6 feet 10 inches (2.08 m) semi-circuler Shivlinga type stone was seen in the bushes of the north bank of Wanki river in May 1215. During that time, this stone was taken by the local people who partially broke it down. Poisonous wasps swarmed from the stone and stung around 60 people within a 1500 ft radius of the temple. All 60 died and were buried on the temple site. The Dargah was created on the site.

One day Shiva appeared in the dreams of a devotee of Abrama and commanded: "Take the linga from the bank of Wanki river. Two of Lord Shiva's devotees can pick it up easily. When the linga becomes too heavy, set it down and create the linga on that place."

The temple ceiling was built twice. After the first time the ceiling was destroyed in a fire. The second time, the ceiling collapsed. Lord Shiva appeared in the dreams of one devotee and said: " I am Tadkeshwar Mahadev. I need the Rays of Sun. Therefore, do not reconstruct the ceiling of the temple.". From that day on, Shivlinga of Tadkeshwar Mahadev was kept safe in the temple.

The peak of the temple remains open to the sky, featuring a hole about 22 feet (6.7 m) in diameter. At noon, the rays of the Sun shine directly on the Shivlinga.
