= Bhavesh Baria =

Indian cricketer (born 1990)

Personal information
- Born: 14 May 1990 (age 36); Nargol, India
- Source: ESPNcricinfo, 17 October 2015

Bhavesh Baria (born 14 May 1990) is an Indian cricketer who plays for Gujarat. He made his first-class debut for Gujarat, against Hyderabad, on 1 December 2012, in the 2012–13 Ranji Trophy.
