= Shri Swaminarayan Mandir, Tithal =

Hindu temple in Gujarat, India

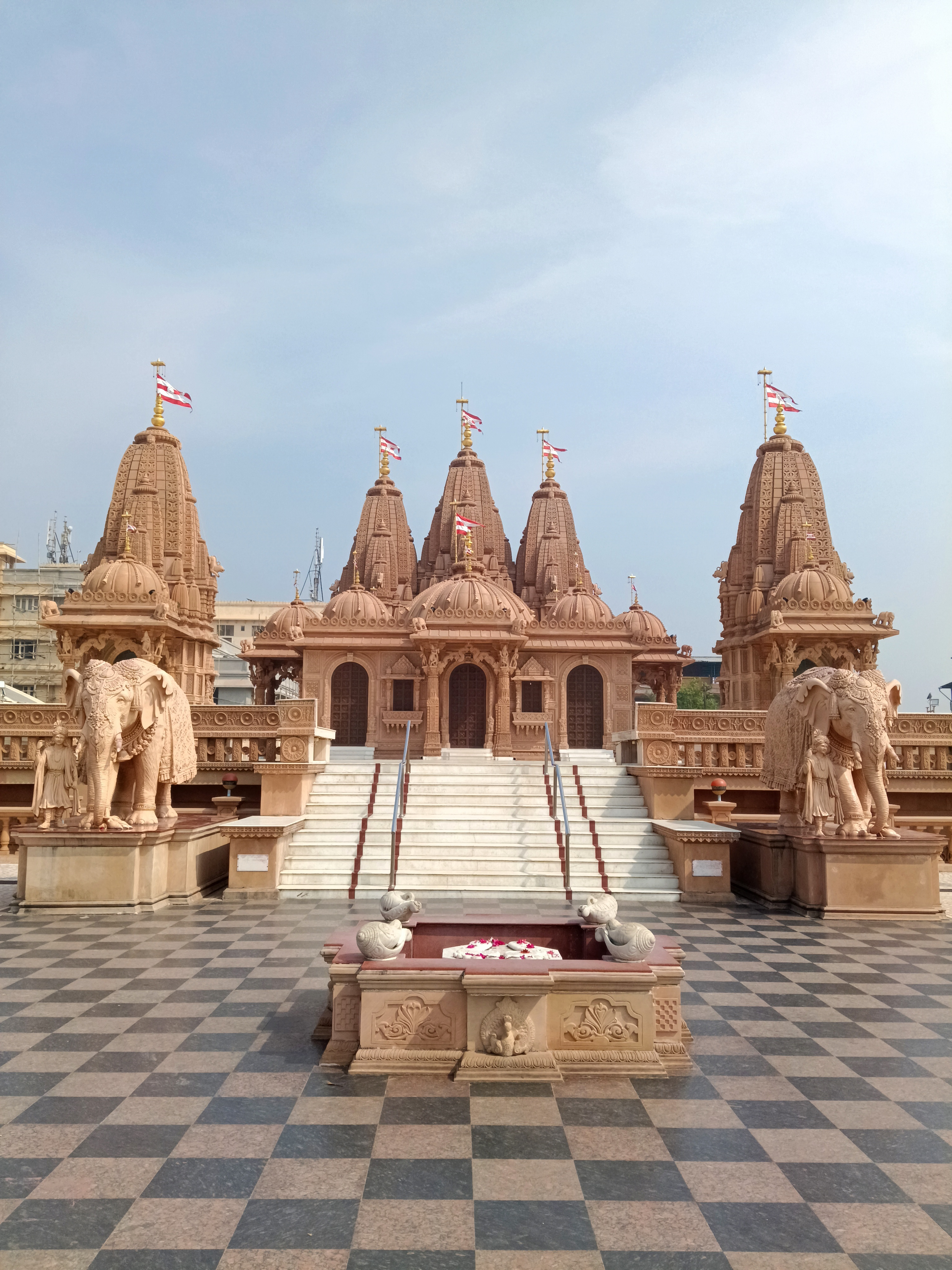

- Location in India

Religion
- Affiliation: Hinduism
- Deity: Swaminarayan

Location
- Location: Tithal, Valsad district, Gujarat, India
- Country: India
- Interactive map of Shri Swaminarayan Mandir, Tithal
- Coordinates: 20°36′43″N 72°53′29″E

Architecture
- Completed: After 1991

Shri Swaminarayan Mandir is located near Tithal town of Valsad district of Gujarat, India. The temple is located exactly on the shore of the beach of Tithal. The temple's construction was started in 1991. The temple is made for worshipping Lord Swami Narayan but apart from Idol of Swaminarayan Bhagwan you can also find Lord Shiva, Parvati, and Ganesh on one side as well as Lord Ram and site too with Lord Hanuman, and also Lord Krishna, Radha, alongside Harikrishna Maharaj (Idol of Swaminarayan himself). The temple was inaugurated by Shree Pramukh Swami. The temple is administrated by BAPS.

It has become of the most popular attraction as people who comes to visit tithal beach also likes to pay visit to the Swaminarayan Temple. Hence it has become one of the popular temple of Valsad district. Popularity of the temple is now increasing day by day because of beautiful carved idols.

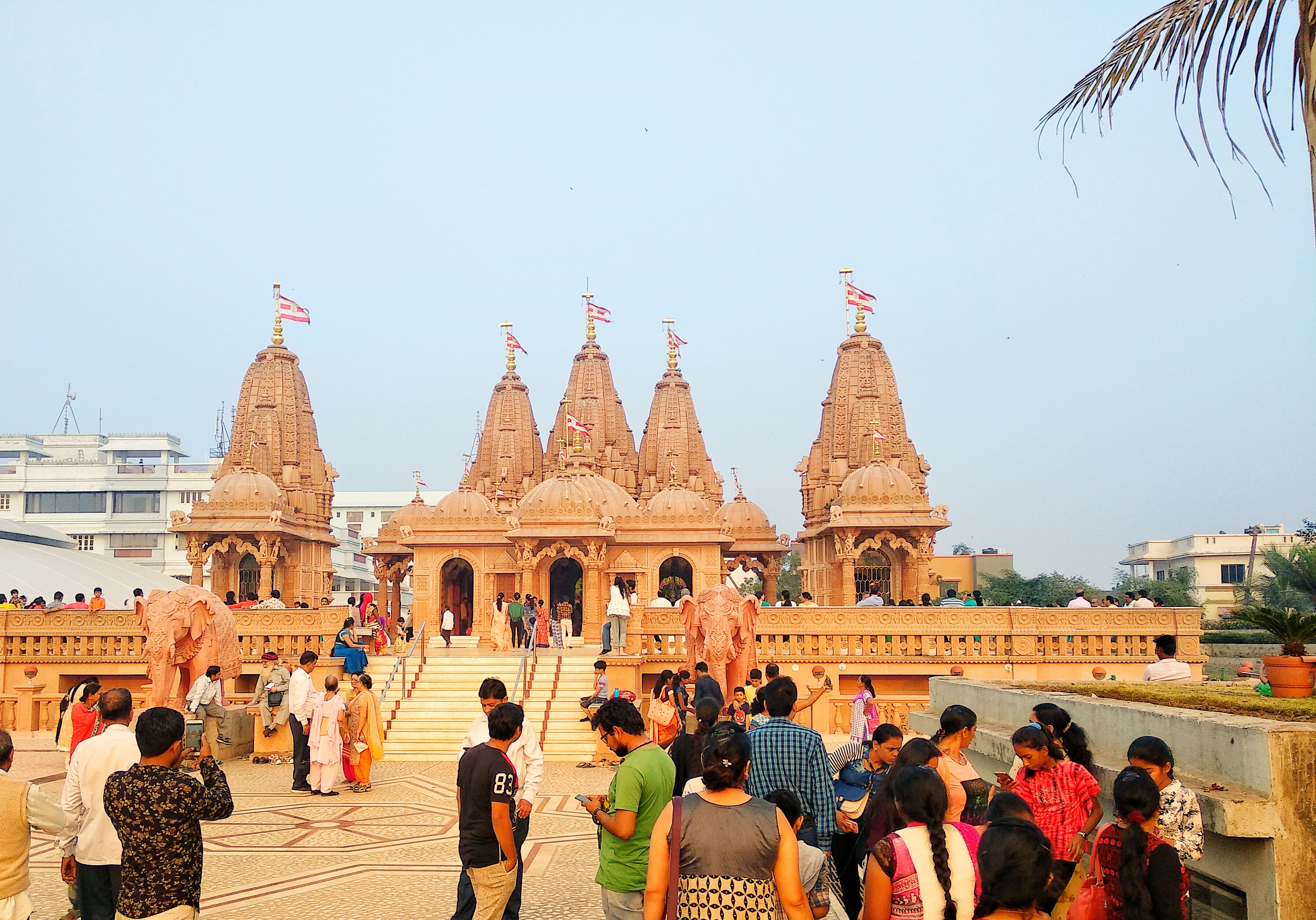
Crowd at Shri Swaminarayan Mandir, Tithal
