= Vapi =

- City
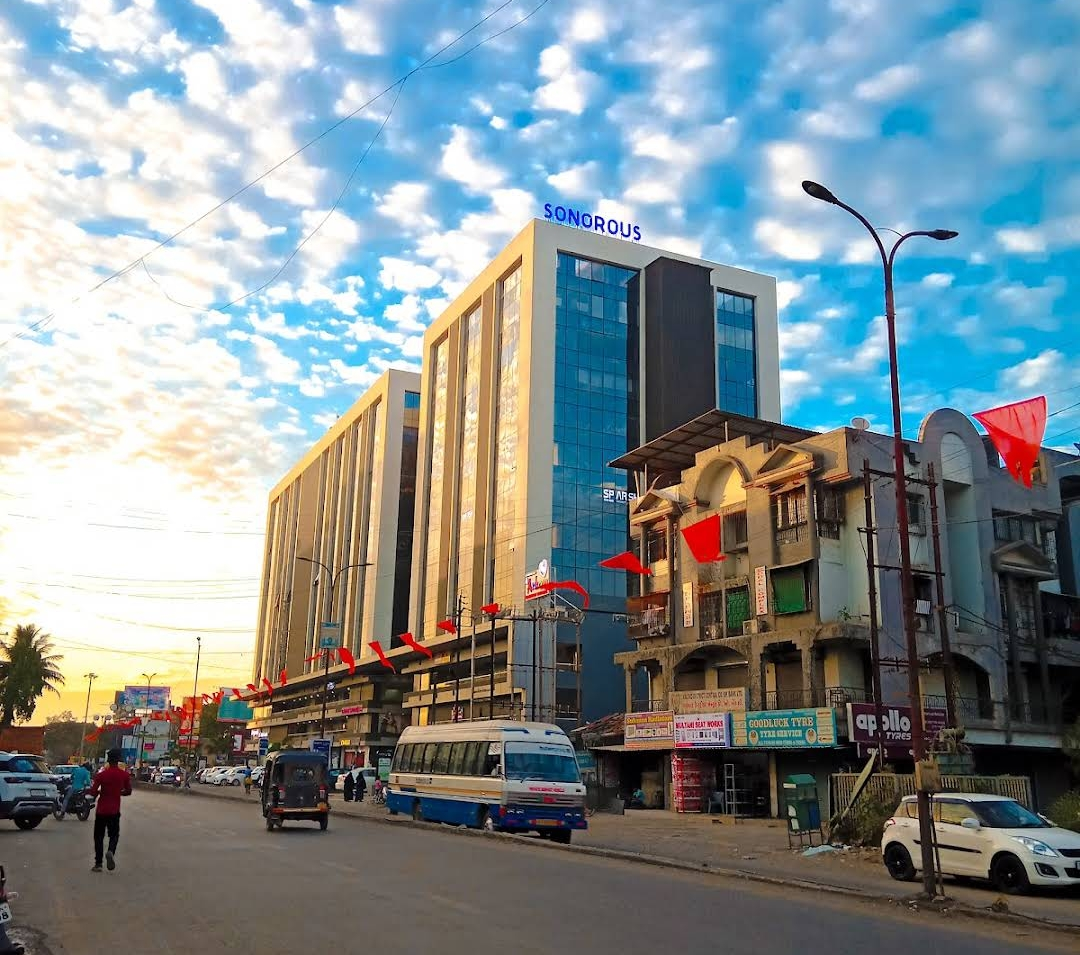
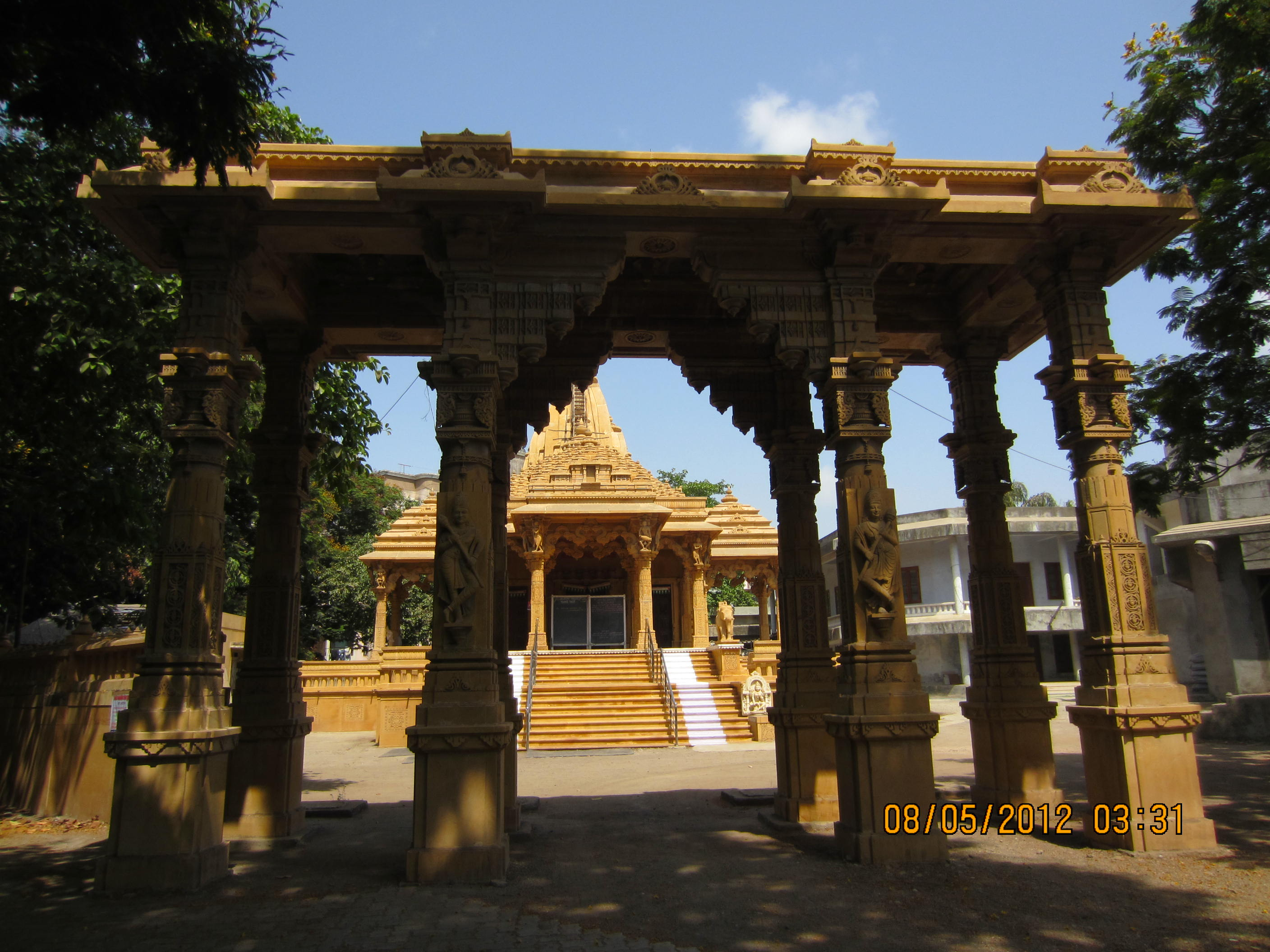
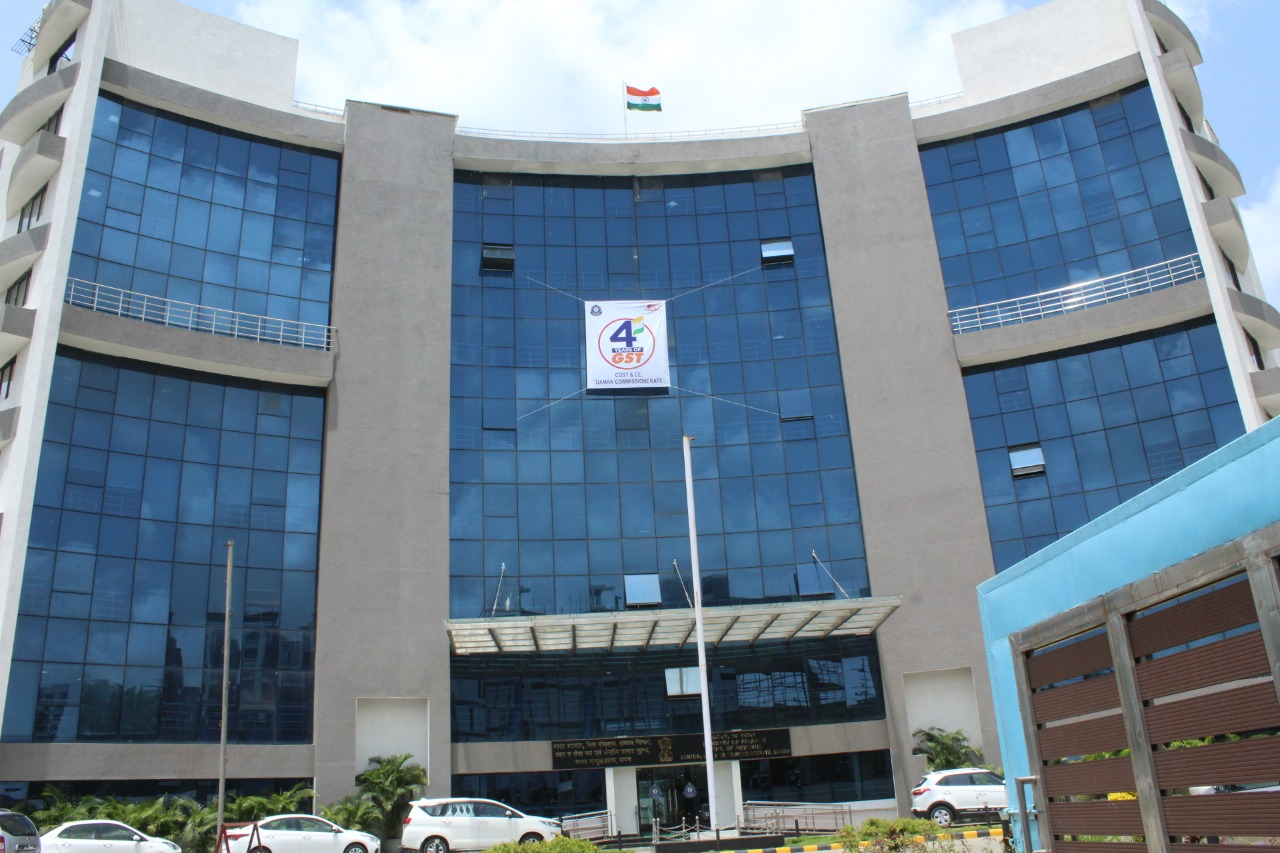
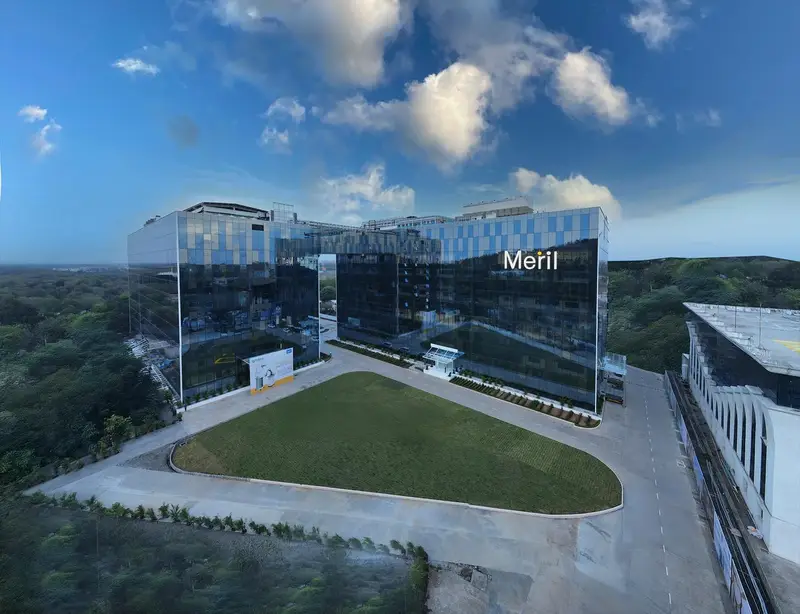
- Smart Industrial City - Vapi

- Location in Gujarat, India
- Coordinates: 20.372°N 72.917°E
- Country: India
- State: Gujarat
- District: Valsad

Government
  - Type: Vapi Municipal Corporation

Area
  - City: 72 km^{2} (28 sq mi)
- Elevation: 27 m (89 ft)

Population (2025)
  - Rank: 287
  - Urban: 230,000
- Demonym(s): Vapians, Vapikars, Vapiwale

Languages
  - Official: Gujarati
- Time zone: UTC+5:30 (IST)
- PIN: 396191 / 396194 / 396195
- 0260: 91260
- Vehicle registration: GJ-15
- Website: m.vapimunicipal.com

Vapi (IAST: Vāpī, IPA: [ˈʋɑpi]) is a city and municipal corporation in Valsad district in the state of Gujarat, India. It is near the banks of the Daman Ganga River, around 28 km south of the district headquarters in the city of Valsad, and it is surrounded by the Union Territory of Dadra and Nagar Haveli and Daman and Diu.

== Geography ==
NH 48 bisects the city. The western part was the original location of the town, while the eastern part consists mainly of industry and newer residential areas. Mumbai is roughly 185 kilometres (115 mi) to the south, and Surat is about 120 kilometres (75 mi) to the north.

The Arabian Sea, at the delta of the Damanganga, is about 7 km to the west. The city has tropical weather and enjoys three distinct seasons: winter, summer, and monsoon, with rainfall ranging from 250 centimetres (98 in) to 300 centimetres (120 in) per annum. The Dhobikhadi, Bhilkhadi, Kolak and Damanganga rivers flow through Vapi.

Surrounding locations include Daman, Dadra and Nagar Haveli, Umargam, Sarigam, Bhilad, Udvada, Sanjan, Pardi and Karambele.

== Transport ==
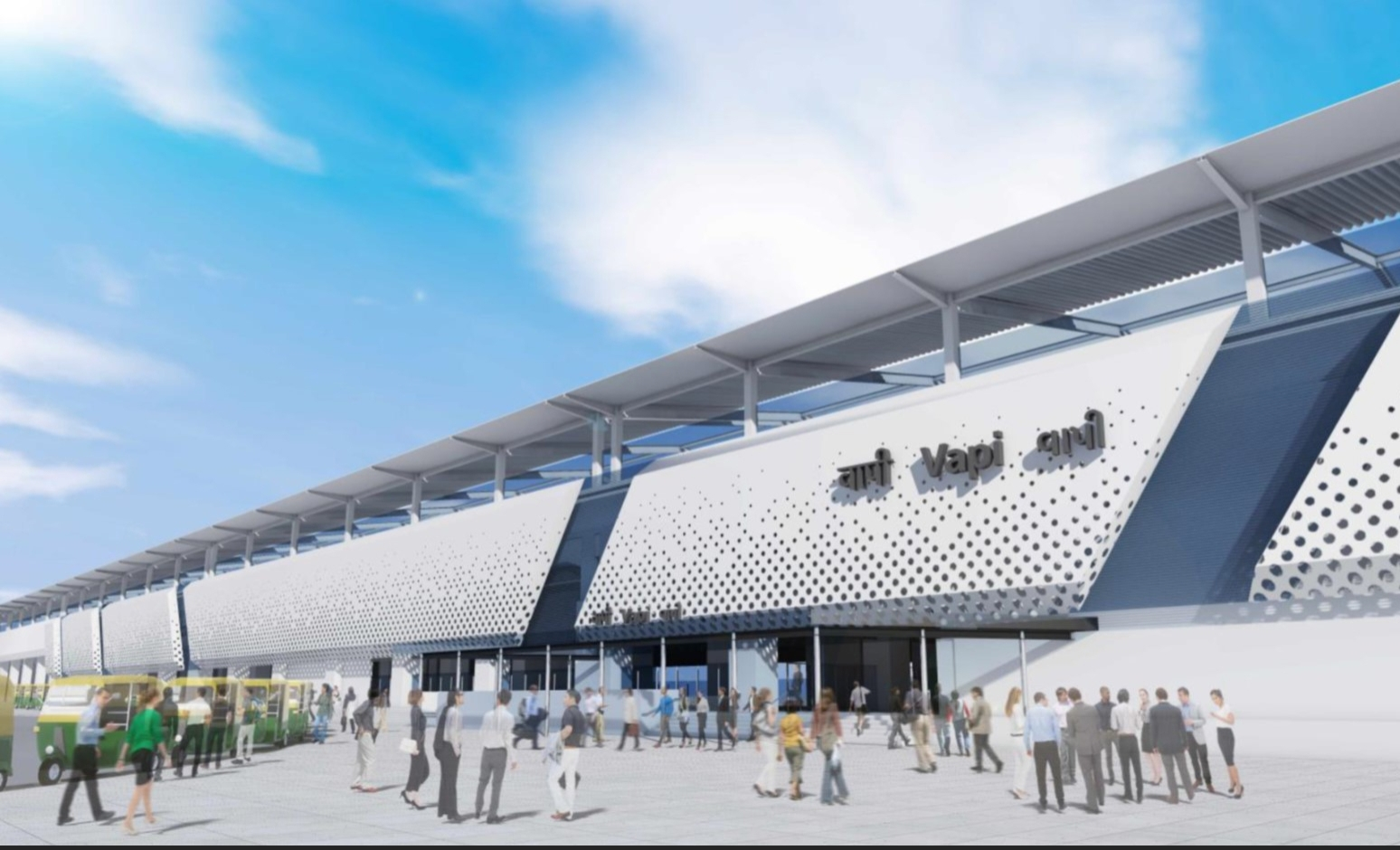
Upcoming Vapi's Bullet Train Station

National Highway 48 passes through Vapi. It is connected to all major cities. It is the only place from which one can visit Daman and Silvassa. City bus service is available.

To cater to industry, the city hosts what is called a "floating population". The Vapi railway station on the Mumbai-Ahmedabad rail link of Western Railway has become the direct beneficiary in terms of revenues due to daily commuters. It is the only city connecting Daman district with Dadra and Nagar Haveli district.

A coast guard airport is running in Daman where private charters can operate with prior permissions. It will also be one of the stations in the Mumbai–Ahmedabad High Speed Rail Corridor, otherwise known as the 'Bullet train project'.

== Economy ==
Vapi has an estimated GDP per capita of $11.4 thousand. Manufacturing industries account for about 40% of all workers in the city.

== Demography ==
As per census of 2011 done by the Indian government, population of Vapi in 2011 was 163,630, of which male and female are 94,105 and 69,525 respectively. The average literacy rate is 89%. Gujarati and Hindi are the most common languages, although due to its need of workers in factories at all levels from labourers to executives, people from all states of India can be found here thriving.

According to 2011 census, Hinduism is majority religion in Vapi city with 77.37% followers. Islam is second most popular religion with approximately 18.37% following it. Christianity is followed by 0.62%, Jainism by 3.11%, Sikhism by 0.15% and Buddhism by 0.15%.

Languages in Vapi (2011)
1. Gujarati (33.0%)
2. Hindi (52.6%)
3. Marathi (6.72%)
4. Other (7.72%)
