= Pratap Save =

Lt. Colonel Pratap Save
- Born: 20 May 1945
- Died: 20 April 2000 (aged 54)
- Spouse: Sunita Save
- Military career
- Allegiance: India
- Branch: Indian Army
- Service years: 1970-1995
- Rank: Lieutenant Colonel
- Other work: Social activism

Pratap Raghunath Save (20 May 1945 – 20 April 2000), was a decorated Indian Army officer and a social activist. A member of a middle-class family in a coastal village of Deheri, Umargam. Save's father, Raghunath Save was a teacher and a freedom fighter. Young Save joined army in order to serve the nation. He later married Sunita Save.

Save served Indian Army for 25 years. After retirement from his job he returned to his hometown. Save's death drawn nationwide attention to his work and his struggle.

== Social Service ==
Save, after his retirement, returned to his hometown. News regarding a mega port project spread throughout the village. This scared the fisherman community of the village, port project risked their settlement. They approached Save to seek help, Save agreed to help the community. Kinara Sangarsh Samiti was formed with Save as its president. They began with peaceful protest against the project. The protest soon gathered the attention of the state government. Save was suddenly arrested at night by local police force. According to the villagers who were jailed too, Save was brutally beaten up by the police.

== Death ==
Save was shifted to Hinduja Hospital, where he spent his last days unconsciously. On 20 April 2000 he was pronounced dead.

After his death, this issue gathered a nationwide attention resulting in abolishment of the port project.

== See also ==
- Narmada Bachao Andolan
- Medha Patkar
- Bhaskar Save
