= Tithal =

- Village
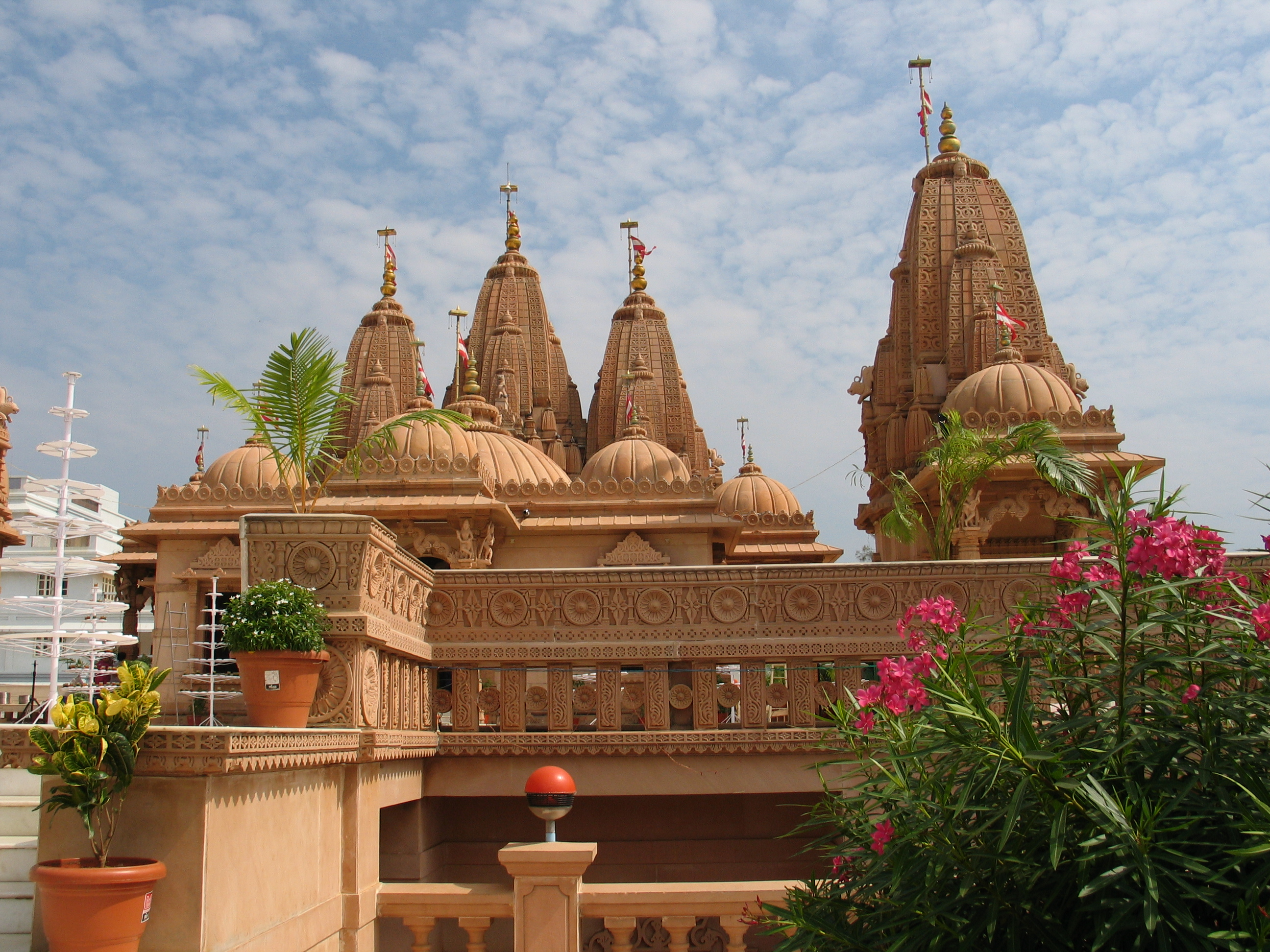
- Shri Swami Narayan Temple Tithal

- Location in India Tithal (India)
- Coordinates: 20.588°N 72.901°E
- Country: India
- State: Gujarat
- District: Valsad

Population (2011)
  - Total: 2,464

Languages
  - Official: Gujarati, Hindi
- Time zone: UTC+5:30 (IST)
- PIN: 396006
- Website: gujaratindia.com

Tithal is an out growth in Valsad district of Gujarat. Tithal is located around 4.1 kilometer away from its district headquarter Valsad. It is known for its beach with brownish-black color soil. Swaminarayan temple, Saibaba temple and Shantidham temple are local places of worship in Tithal.

== Gallery ==
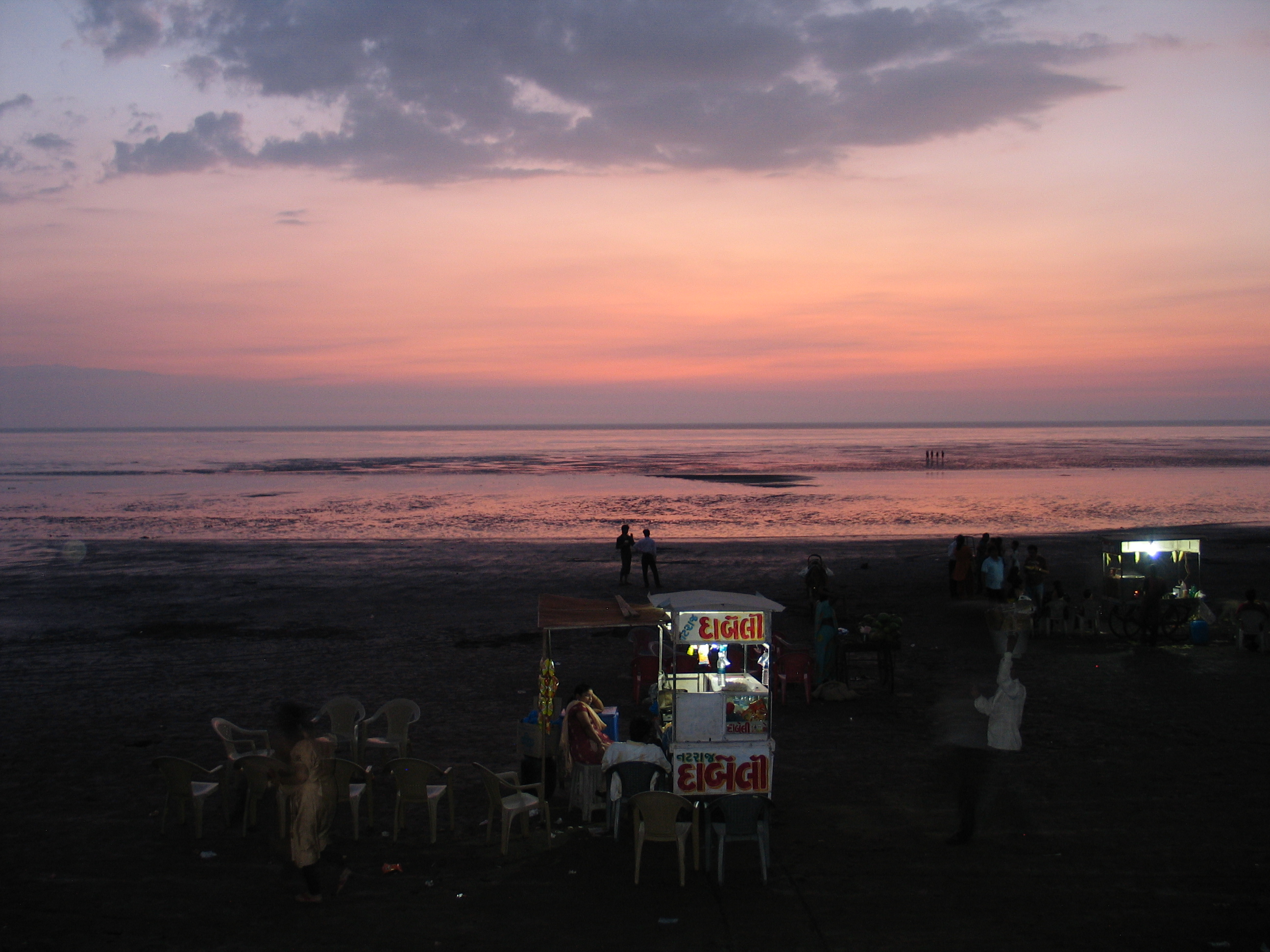
Tithal beach

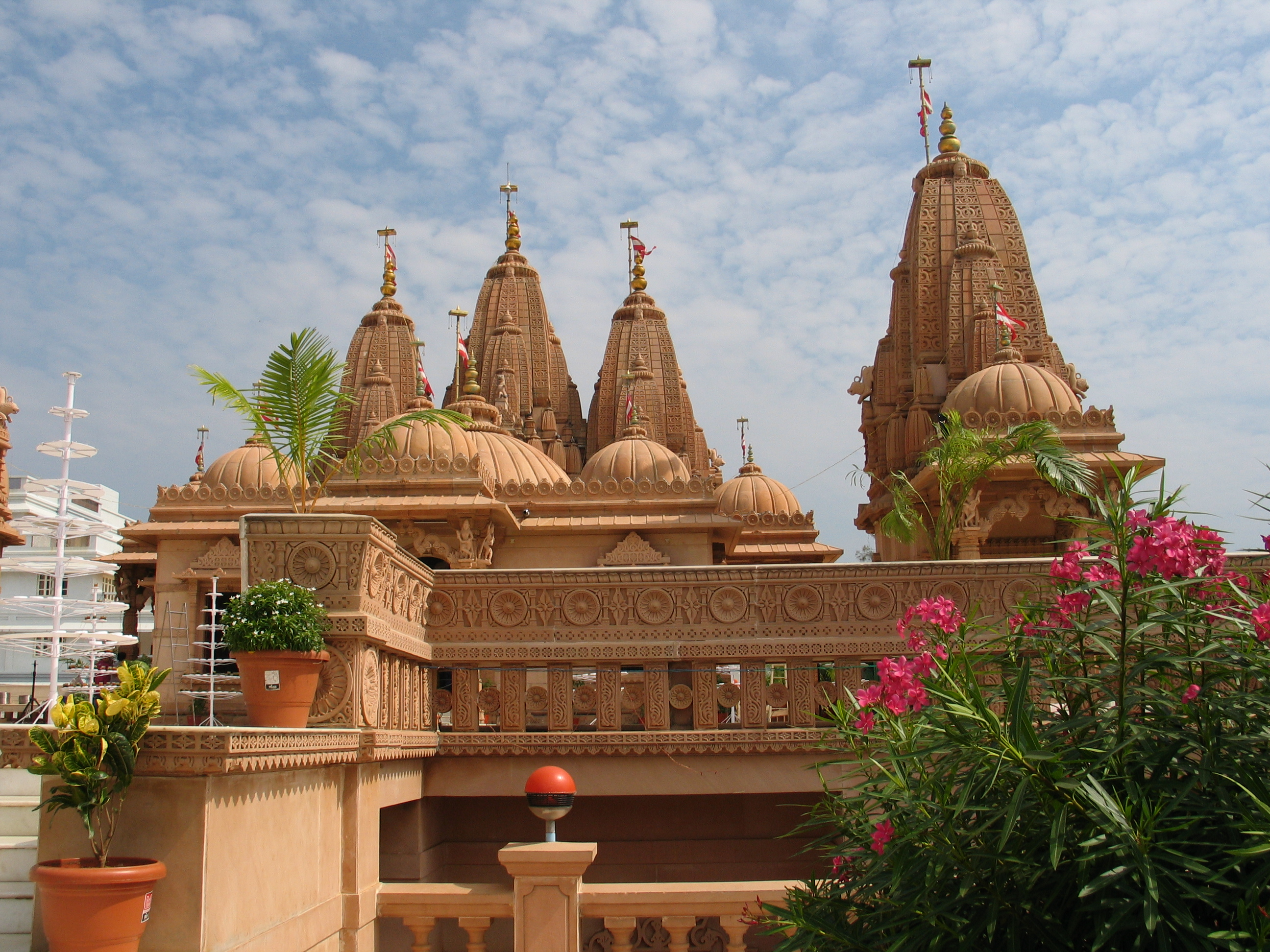
Swaminarayan temple

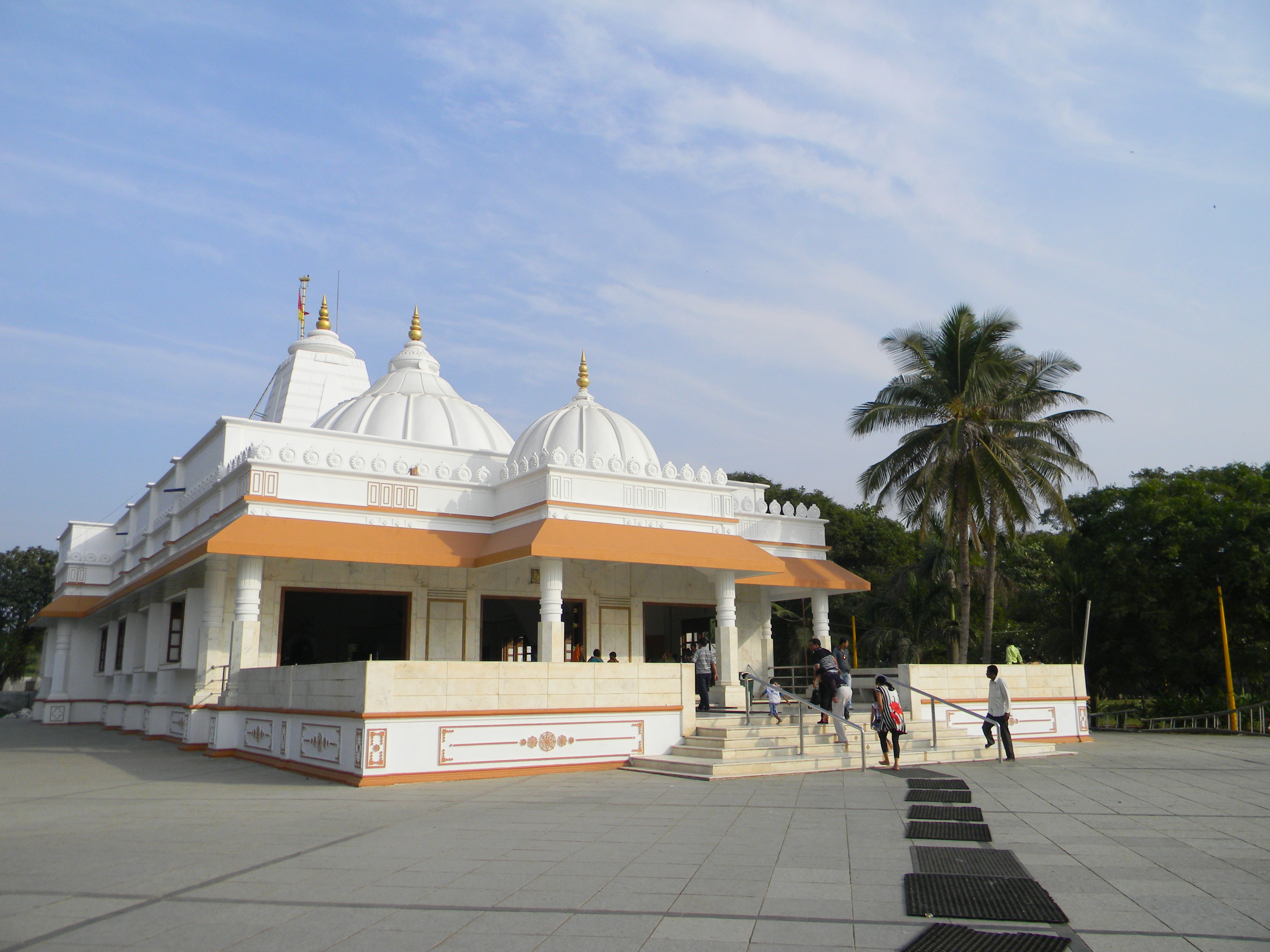
Saibaba temple
