= Abrama =

Ward of Valsad city in Gujarat, India

Abrama Khara Abrama
- Town
- Location in Gujarat, India Abrama (India)
- Coordinates: 20.58341°N 72.94231°E
- Country: India
- State: Gujarat
- District: Navsari

Population (2001)
  - Total: 21,035

Languages
  - Official: Gujarati, Hindi
- Time zone: UTC+5:30 (IST)
- Postal code: 396406
- Vehicle registration: GJ
- Website: gujaratindia.com

Abrama is a ward of the Valsad city in the Indian state of Gujarat.

== Demographics ==
As of the India census, Abrama had a population of 21,035. Males constituted 53% of the population and females 47%. The average literacy rate was 78%, higher than the national average of 59.5%; with 57% of the males and 43% of females literate. 12% of the population was under 6 years of age.

Abrama is the centre of many surrounding villages. There is one primary school, one high school with agriculture and technical departments and one engineering college. Abrama was known for its sea salt beds, with many people working in natural sea salt production. Abrama is renowned for its robust farming and agriculture sector. The area produces a variety of crops including mangos, chickoo (sapota), rice, sugarcane, and vegetables.
