= Valsad district =

Valsad district Bulsar district
- District of Gujarat
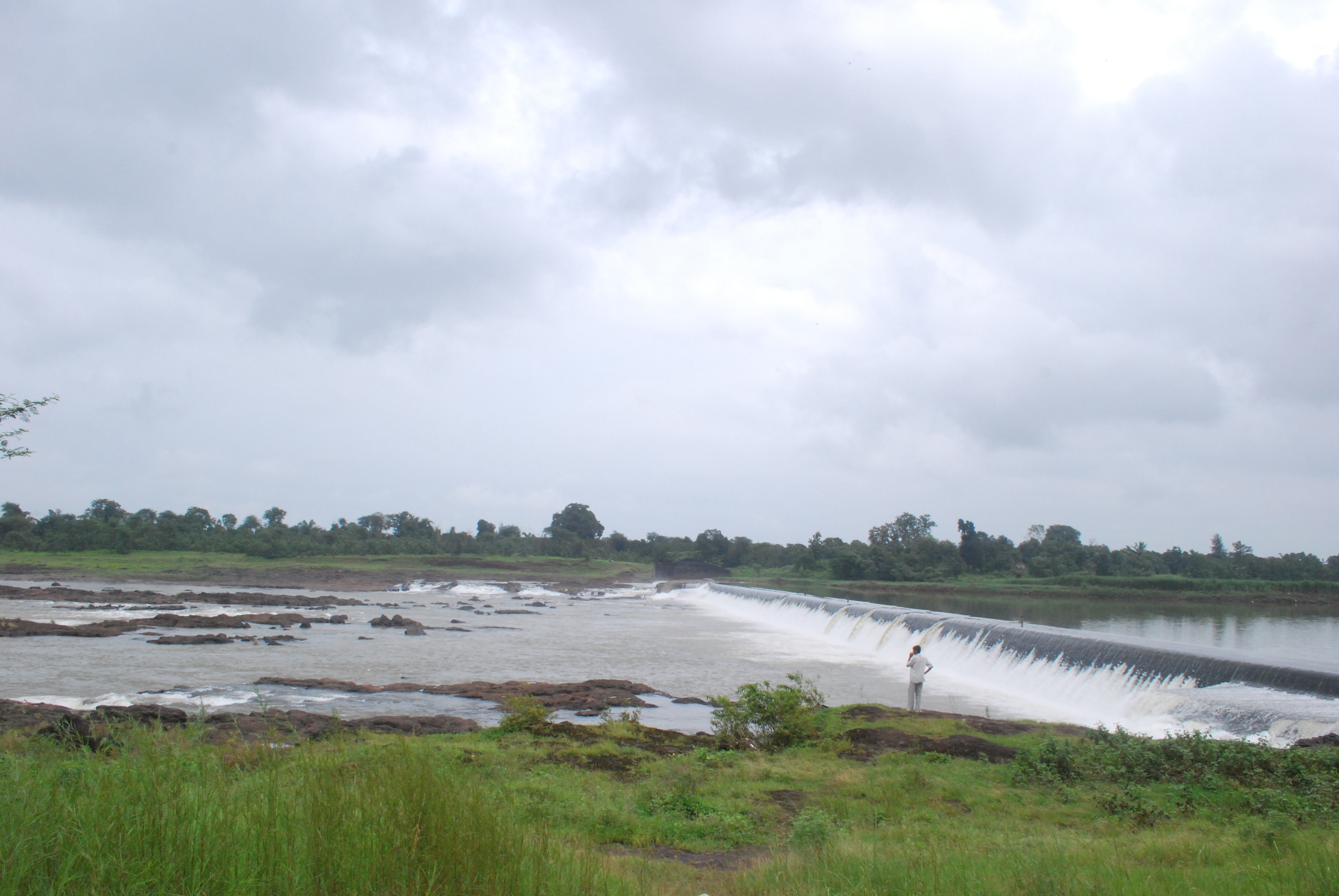
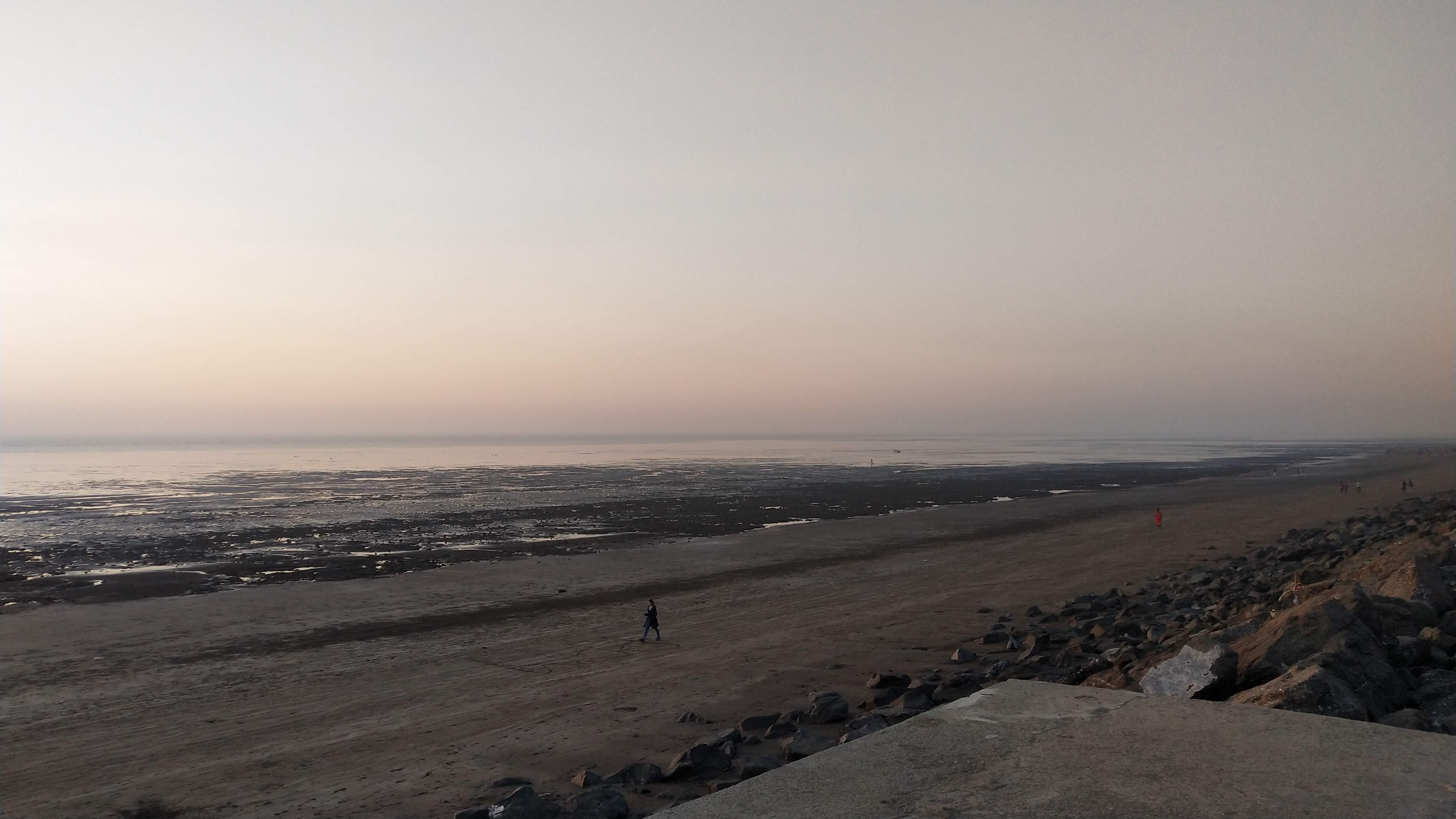
- Top: Check dam in Panchlai, Pardi; Bottom: Tithal Beach
- Interactive Map Outlining Valsad District
- Location of Valsad district in Gujarat
- Coordinates: 20°36′36″N 72°55′33″E
- Country: India
- State: Gujarat
- Headquarters: Valsad

Government
  - Collector: Shri Bhavya Verma (IAS)

Area
  - Total: 2,947.49 km^{2} (1,138.03 sq mi)

Population (2011)
  - Total: 1,705,678
  - Density: 578.688/km^{2} (1,498.80/sq mi)

Languages
  - Official: Gujarati
- Time zone: UTC+5:30 (IST)
- PIN: 396001
- Telephone code: 912632
- Vehicle registration: GJ-15
- Largest city: Vapi
- Sex ratio: 922 Females per 1000 Males ♂/♀
- Website: valsad.nic.in

Valsad district (previously Bulsar district) is one of the 34 districts in the Western Indian state of Gujarat. It is bound by Navsari district to the north, Nashik district of Maharashtra state to the east, and Dadra and Nagar Haveli district of the Dadra and Nagar Haveli and Daman and Diu (DNHDD) union territory and the Palghar district of Maharashtra to the south. The Arabian Sea lies west of the district. The coastal Damaon enclave of DNHDD is bounded by Valsad district on the north, east, and south. The district's administrative capital is Valsad. The district's largest city is Vapi.

The district covers 3008 square kilometres and is divided into six talukas: Valsad, Vapi, Pardi, Umargam, Kaparada and Dharampur. The population was 1,705,678 in 2011, up from 1,410,553 in 2001. Valsad is well known for its production of mangoes, sapodilla, teak and industrial hubs based in Vapi, Pardi and Atul.

== History ==
On 1 June 1966, Valsad district was formed after Surat district was bifurcated into Valsad and Surat district. Then, Valsad, Dharampur, Pardi, Umargam, Navsari, Vansda, Chikhli and Gandevi were talukas of Valsad district.

On 2 October 1997, Navsari district was formed after Valsad district was bifurcated into Valsad and Navsari district. The taluka of Kaparada was separated from Dharampur on 15 October 1997. After newly formed Kaparada taluka - Valsad, Dharampur, Kaparada, Pardi, Umargam were talukas of Valsad district.

On 9 September 2013, Vapi taluka was separated from Pardi taluka. After newly formed Vapi taluka - Valsad, Dharampur, Kaparada, Pardi, Vapi, Umargam are talukas of Valsad district.

== Geography ==
Geography of Valsad District
Average rainfall	2000 mm
Average temperature	26.9 °C
Seismic Zone	Zone III
Major rivers	Damanganga, Par, Auranga, Kolak, Taan and Maan
Hills	Parnera Hill, Wilson Hills
Beaches	Tithal Beach, Nargol Beach, Umargam Beach

== Demographics ==
Historical population
Year	Pop.	±% p.a.
1901	261,031	—
1911	279,159	+0.67%
1921	280,231	+0.04%
1931	308,074	+0.95%
1941	371,662	+1.89%
1951	441,007	+1.73%
1961	549,439	+2.22%
1971	696,126	+2.39%
1981	864,371	+2.19%
1991	1,087,980	+2.33%
2001	1,410,553	+2.63%
2011	1,705,678	+1.92%

According to the 2011 census Valsad district has a population of 1,705,678. The district has a population density of 580 inhabitants per square kilometre (1,500/sq mi). Its population growth rate over the decade 2001-2011 was 20.92%. Valsad has a sex ratio of 922 females for every 1000 males. 37.26% of the population lives in urban areas. Scheduled Castes and Scheduled Tribes make up 2.24% and 52.93% of the population respectively.

Religions in Valsad district (2011)
Religion	Percent
Hinduism	92.11%
Islam	5.51%
Christianity	1.15%
Jainism	0.81%
Other or not stated	0.42%

Sacred place for Parsis, Iranshah Atash Behram is also located in Udvada. Udwada Atash Behram is a sacred fire housed in a temple in Udvada, Gujarat on the west coast of India.

=== Language ===
Languages in Valsad district (2011)
1. Gujarati (70.8%)
2. Hindi (13.6%)
3. Bhili (11.0%)
4. Marathi (2.36%)
5. Other (2.18%)

At the time of the 2011 Census of India, 70.83% of the population in the district spoke Gujarati, 13.6% Hindi, 5.75% Varli, 5.19% Kukna, 2.36% Marathi and as their first language.

== Divisions ==
Valsad district has six talukas:

1. Valsad
2. Pardi
3. Vapi
4. Dharampur
5. Kaparada
6. Umargam

Valsad district has three major cities:

1. Valsad
2. Vapi
3. Pardi

== Politics ==
District	No.	Constituency	Name	Party	Remarks
Valsad	178	Dharampur (ST)	Arvind Patel	Bharatiya Janata Party	
Valsad	179	Valsad	Bharat Patel	Bharatiya Janata Party	
Valsad	180	Pardi	Kanubhai Desai	Bharatiya Janata Party	Cabinet Minister
Valsad	181	Kaprada (ST)	Jitubhai Chaudhary	Bharatiya Janata Party	
Valsad	182	Umbergaon (ST)	Ramanlal Patkar	Bharatiya Janata Party	

== Transport ==
Valsad lies on NH 48. Valsad is connected to many cities in Gujarat by the Gujarat State Road Transport Corporation bus service. Valsad is one of the 16 divisions of GSRTC referred to as Daman Ganga. Following bus depots come under the Valsad division: Valsad, Vapi, Navsari, Bilimora, Dharampur, and Ahwa.

Valsad railway station is managed by the Mumbai WR railway division of the Western Railway. It lies on the New Delhi–Mumbai mainline. The present railway station building was established in 1925. Adjacent to the railway station is the Valsad Electric Loco Shed which houses over 100 electric locomotives. Other railway stations in the district are Umargam Road, Sanjan, Bhilad, Vapi, Udvada, Pardi and Dungri.

The nearest airport is Surat Airport in Surat.

== Economy ==
=== Agriculture ===
Valsad is a horticulture hub in Gujarat. Major horticulture crops that are produced in the district are mango, papaya, guava, cucurbits, chikoo, banana and sugarcane. Valsad is also known as the mango capital of Gujarat and is famous for its Alphonso mango (Valsadi Haafus). Valsadi chikoo is in high demand nationwide as well as around the world.

=== Industry ===
Valsad is an industrial base for sectors such as chemicals, textiles, and paper & pulp industries. Since the 1980s, textile and chemicals have been the major sectors of investments and employment in the district. Valsad is emerging as a horticulture hub of the state, witnessing significant production in food grains and crops.

Valsad has 7 Industrial Estates located in Dungra, Pardi, Dharampur, Bhilad, Valsad, Umargam, Sarigam, Vapi (the chemical hub of Gujarat) and 1 Industrial park in Kalgam. With over 300 medium and large scale industries, Vapi is a major industrial center in Valsad. One of Asia's largest Common Effluent Treatment Plant (CETP) is present in Vapi, owned by Vapi Waste & Effluent Management Company and promoted by Vapi Industrial Association.

Over 10,716 units of small and medium enterprises (SMEs), involved in different sectors, such as chemicals, textiles, engineering, and paper industry, are present in the district. Several private conglomerates are present in Valsad, such as Alok Industries Ltd., Wyeth, Welspun India Ltd. Hubergroup India Private Limited (formerly Micro Inks Ltd.), Meril Group of companies (Meril Life Sciences Pvt. Ltd., Meril Healthcare Pvt. Ltd., Meril Endo Surgery Pvt. Ltd. and Meril Diagnostics Pvt. Ltd.), Aarti Industries, Atul Limited, Gujarat Heavy Chemicals Ltd. (GHCL), Raymond, Sun Pharmaceuticals, United Phosphorus, Pidilite, Exemed Pharmaceuticals, Polyols & Polymers and Vadilal, Unique Polymers.

== Education ==
The Government Polytechnic, established in 1965, is one of the prominent institutions in Valsad. The Government Engineering College was established in 2004. The GMERS Medical college with an 800-bed hospital was also set up in Valsad in 2014.

Many colleges offer various courses in science, commerce and arts in Valsad district. S.K.M. Law College is also established.

== Important places ==
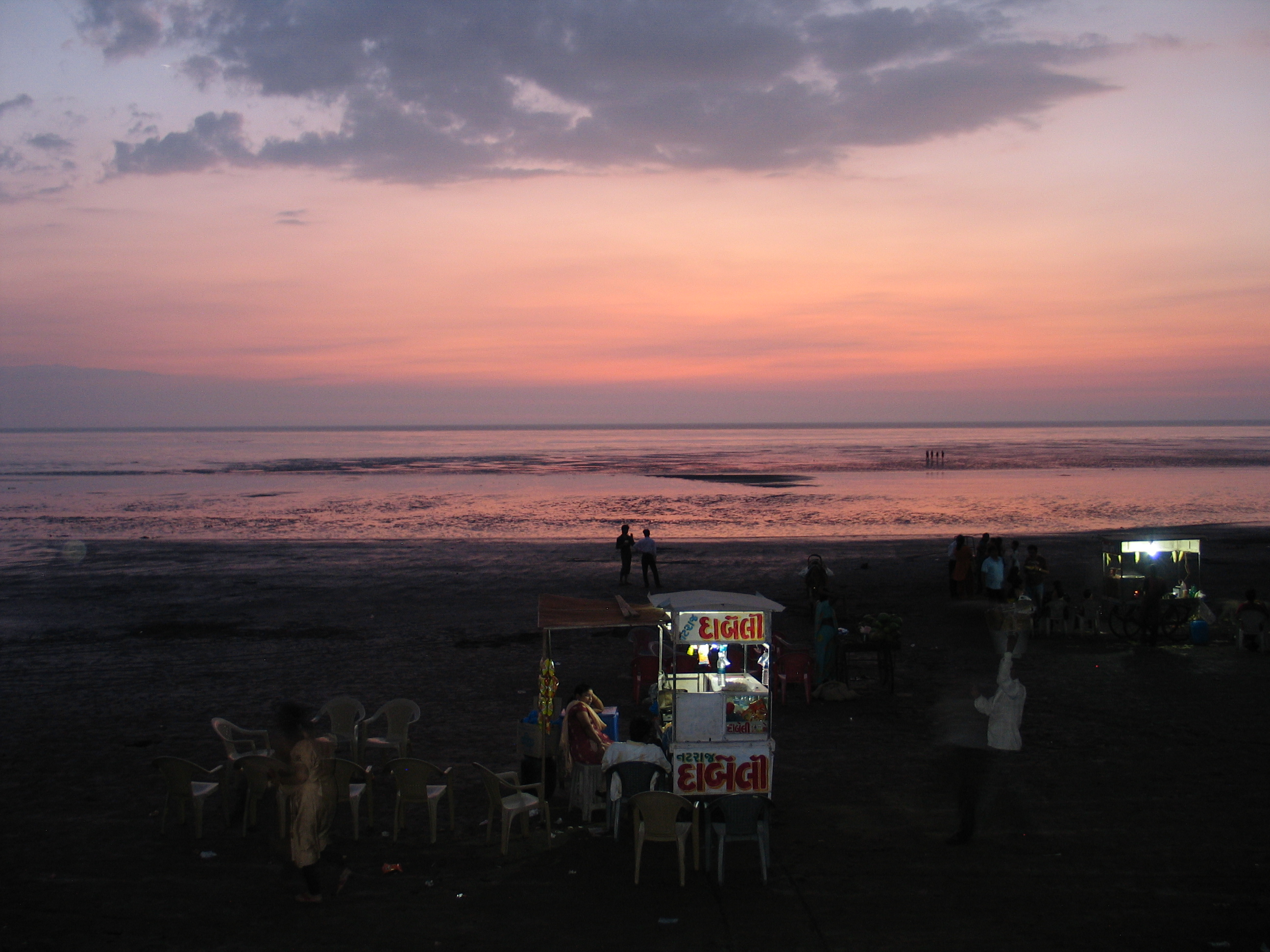
Tithal Beach

Tithal Beach is located near Tithal town of Valsad district. The sand of the beach is black sand. Tithal Beach Festival and International Kite Festival are also organized on the shore of the beach.

Shree Shirdi Saibaba Sansthapan is located on the shore of the beach in Tithal town of Valsad district. The temple was established in 1982.

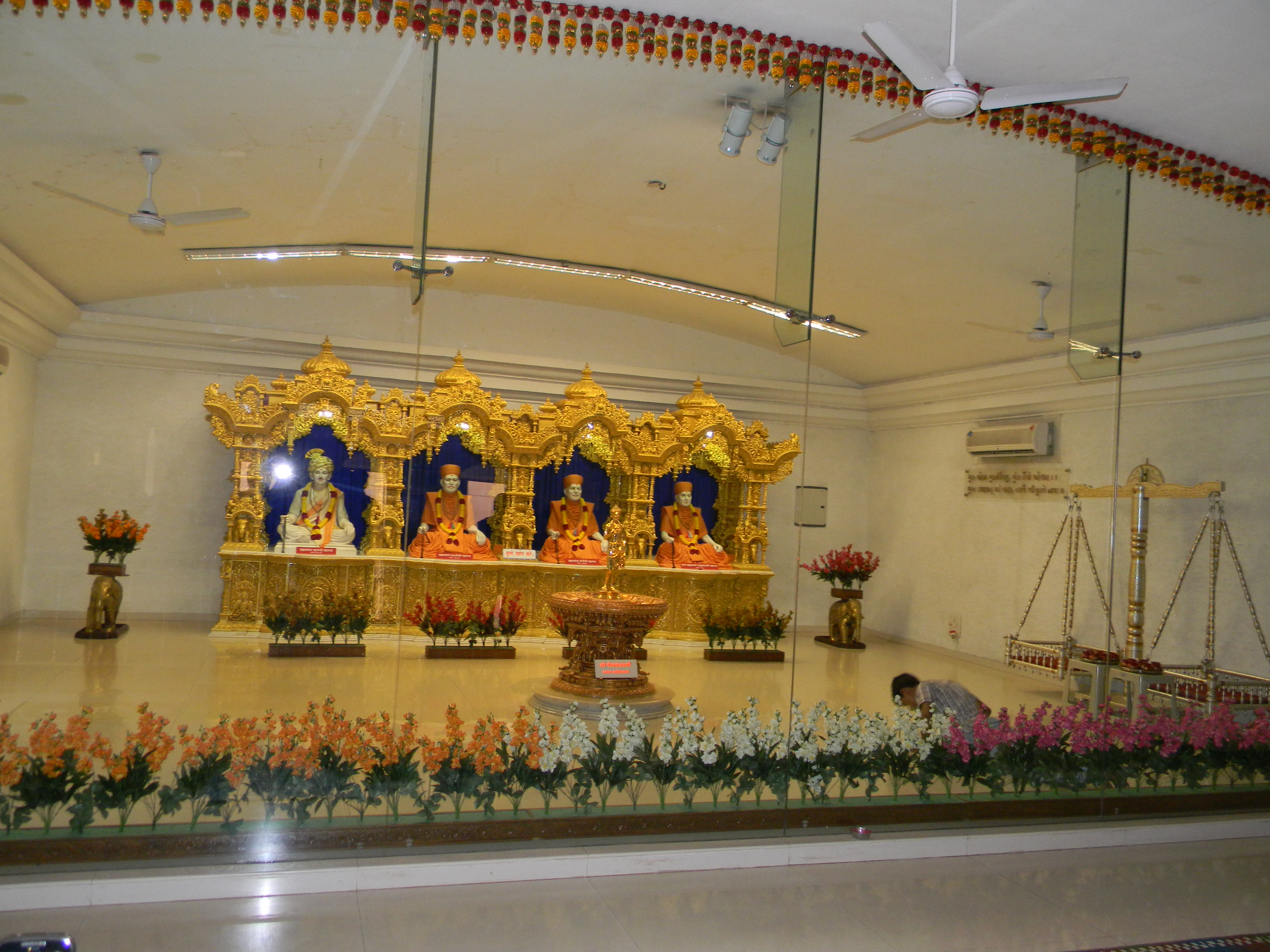
Swaminarayan Temple, Tithal

Shri Swaminarayan Mandir is located on the shore of the beach in Tithal town of Valsad district. This is a temple of Lord Swami Narayan.

Shanti Dham Aradhana Kendra in Tithal is a meditation center.

Tadkeshwar Mahadev Temple is a temple of Lord Shiva located in Abrama. This temple is more than 800 years old.

Morarji Desai Museum is built to dedicate the former 5th Prime Minister of India, Morarji Desai in Valsad. The museum was developed by Valsad municipality at a cost of Rs. 4 crores. The museum was inaugurated by former Chief Minister of Gujarat, Anandiben Patel.

Callian Baug is an urban park in Valsad. In 1929, Mr. Motilal Callianji presented a donation for the park to Valsad Municipality in memory of his father. In 1931, Callian Baug was opened by J.H.Garrett.

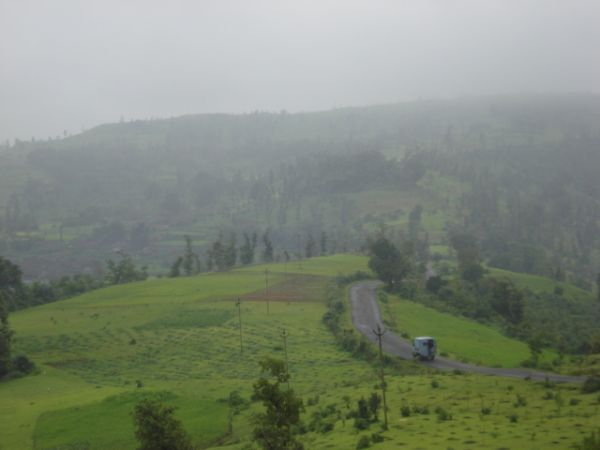
Wilson Hills, Dharampur

Wilson Hills is located in Dharampur tehsil. Wilson Hills was named in memory of Lord Wilson, the Governor of Bombay from 1923 to 1928, by Vijay Devji, the last King of Dharampur. A monument to their memory remains on the peak.

Lady Wilson Museum is located in Dharampur town of Valsad district. It was established in 1928. It is one of the popular tourist attraction of Valsad district.

District Science Centre is located in Dharampur. It was established in 1984.

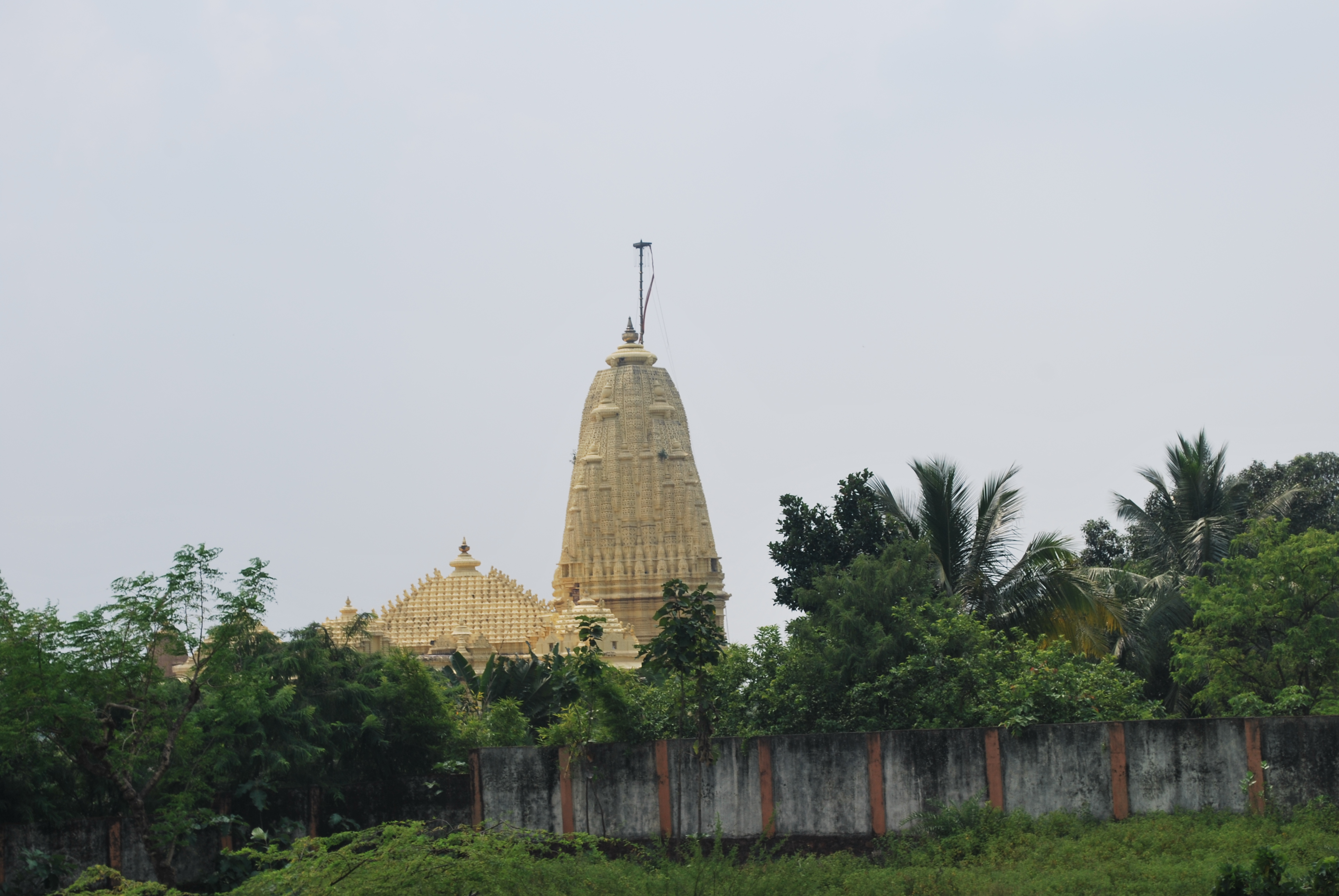
Simandhar Swami Jain Derasar, Nandigram

Shrimad Rajchandra Ashram is located in Dharampur town of Valsad district. It is the International Headquarters of Shrimad Rajchandra Mission Dharampur.

Simandhar Swami Jain Derasar, also known as Nandigram Derasar, is at Nandigram village near Bhilad in Valsad district. A function was organised on Vaisakh Sudh 6th on its foundation day, 10 May 1989. This temple is dedicated to Shri Simandhar Swami who is considered living tirthankar on another world in the Jain mythological universe.

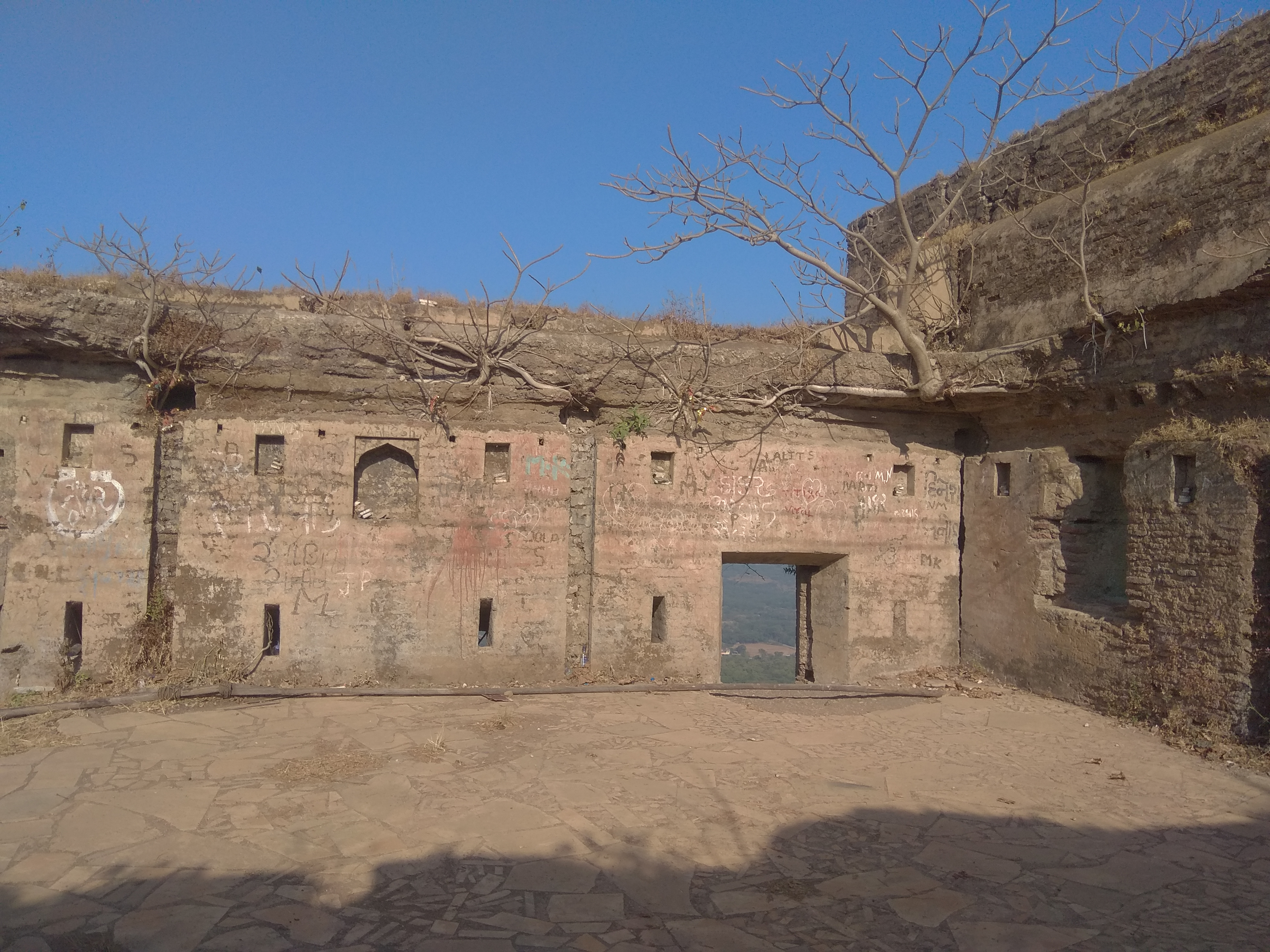
Fort of Parnera

Parnera Hill is located in Parnera town of Valsad district. It is well known for Shree Maha Kali Mata Temple, Shree Chandika Mata Temple, Shree Swayambhu Mahadev Temple, Chand Pir Baba Dargah, Stepwells, Old Fort of The Great Shivaji Maharaj.

Maa Vishvambhari Tirthyatra Dham is located near Rabda. It has a temple of Maa Vishvambhari, Pathshala, Himalayas, Govardhan mountain, Hut of Nand Baba, Gaushala and Shri Ram Kutir.

Bagwada is home to Arjungad Fort and several temples, including a Jain temple.

Shri Bhav Bhaveshwar Mahadev Temple is located in Barumal. Barumal is located 37 km from Valsad and 7 km from Dharampur. This is a temple of Lord Shiva.

Nargol Beach is located in Nargol. It has lush palm trees and greenery all around on the beach.

Umargam Beach is located in Umargam.

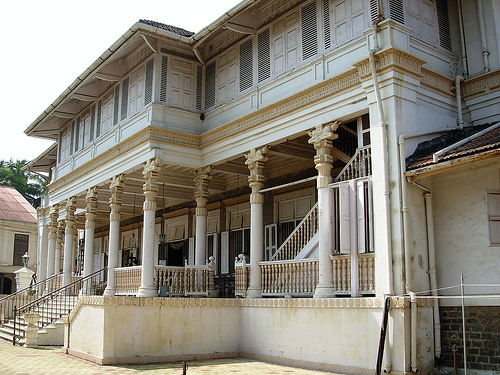
Udvada Atash Behram, Udvada

Udvada Atash Behram is the oldest fire temple of Zoroastrianism in India. It is located in Udvada. Sanjan Stambh is a memorial of the Zoroastrianism in Sanjan.

== Notable people ==
- Bhavesh Baria - first-class cricketer playing for Gujarat cricket team.
- Bhulabhai Desai - freedom fighter and acclaimed lawyer.
- Bindu Desai - Hindi film actress.
- Dadabhoy Havewala - first-class cricketer, who played for Bombay cricket team and Parsees cricket team.
- Hemin Desai - Indian-born cricketer, who has represented Oman at the List A cricket.
- Kanubhai Desai - Finance minister of Gujarat
- Makarand Dave - Gujarati poet.
- Manilal Desai - Gujarati poet.
- Morarji Desai - former Prime Minister of India.
- Nagindas Parekh - literary critic, editor and translator.
- Nanubhai Vakil - a Hindi and Gujarati film director.
- Narayan Desai - Gujarati author.
- Nirupa Roy - Hindi film actress.
- Pooja Jhaveri - Telugu, Tamil and Kannada film actress.
- Pramodkumar Patel - literary critic.
- Pratap Save - a social activist.
- Ravindra Parekh - a writer, novelist, poet, critic and translator.
- Rex Sellers - a former Indian-Australian cricketer.
- Sangeita Chauhan - South Indian film & Hindi television actress.
- Sheela Sharma - Hindi and Gujarati film actress.
- Ushnas - Gujarati poet.

== See also ==
- Gulf of Khambhat
- Forest of the Dangs
