= Umargam =

Umargam Umbergaon
- Municipality
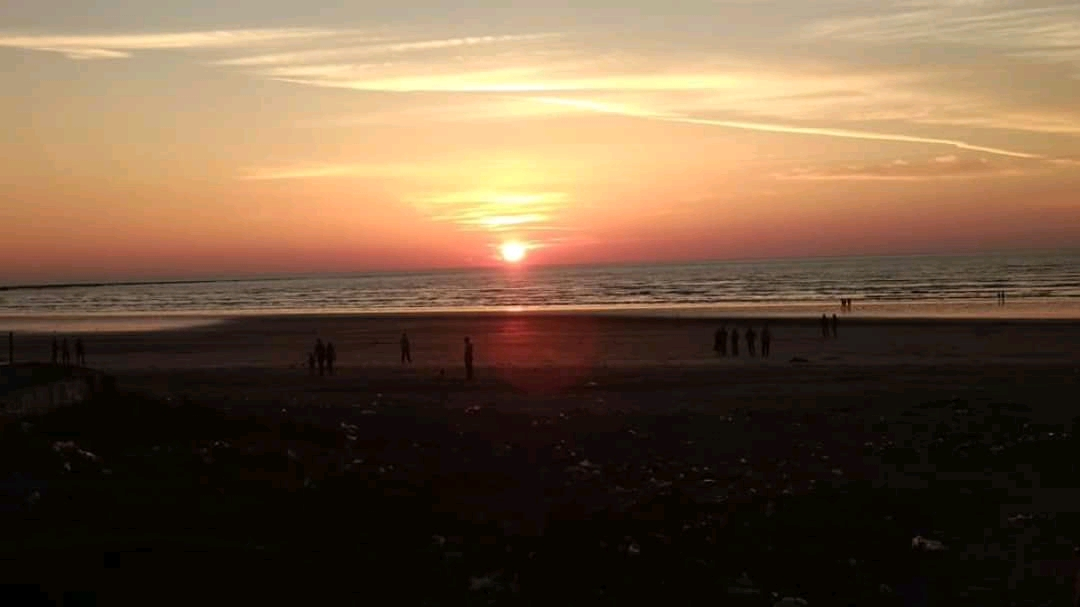
- Sunset over Umargam Beach

- Location in Gujarat, India Umargam (India)
- Coordinates: 20°10′28″N 72°46′02″E
- Country: India
- State: Gujarat
- District: Valsad

Government
  - Type: Municipality
  - Assembly constituency: Umargam (Vidhan Sabha constituency)

Population (2011)
  - Total: 27,857

Languages
  - Official: Gujarati
- Time zone: UTC+5:30 (IST)
- Pin Code: 396170 / 396171 / 396165
- Telephone code: 91-260-XXX-XXXX
- Vehicle registration: GJ-15
- Website: Valsad tehsils

Umargam (IAST: Umargām), also known as Umbergaon (IAST: Umbargāv) is a census town and Municipality in the Indian state of Gujarat. The town is known for its beaches, its tourist attractions, and its film industry. In 2017, the town became home to India's first nanotechnology manufacturing plant.

== Etymology ==
The Prakritized form of the Sanskrit name "Udumbar-gram" is mentioned as a name of the place in the 15th-17th century Marathi-language text Mahikavatichi Bakhar, "gram" being the Shilahara-era suffix for a small village.

== Demographics ==
As of the 2011 Indian census, Umargam had a population of 21,648. 55% of the city was male, while 45% was female. Umargam has a literacy rate of 71%, which is higher than the national average. Several languages are spoken in Umargam, including Gujarati, Hindi, and Marathi.

== Tourism ==
In 2012, the Government of Gujarat announced that tourism-related infrastructure will be developed in Umargam, and other towns in the region of Gujarat.

Umargam Beach is popular tourist attraction in the town of Umargam. The location is famous for its 'Chowpatty style' street food, which includes items such as Bhelpuri, Panipuri, Sevpuri, and vada pav. Horse-pulled carriages offer rides to tourists, and the beach is a popular site in the city for the annual Ganesh Chaturthi celebration and other festival like Holi, beach is mostly crowded during evening time. There is a small place named Sarai Fatak which is situated near to Sarigam. It is very natural place.

== Climate ==
Umargam is located in hilly area with a uniform climate. During the summer the temperature reaches 35 °C. Monsoons prevail from mid June to September. Umargam is located at 20.17°N 72.76°E. The town receives average annual precipitation of 1718mm.

Climate data for Umargam (1981–2012)
| Month | Jan | Feb | Mar | Apr | May | Jun | Jul | Aug | Sep | Oct | Nov | Dec | Year |
|---|---|---|---|---|---|---|---|---|---|---|---|---|---|
| Mean daily maximum °C (°F) | 27.6 (81.7) | 29.3 (84.7) | 30.5 (86.9) | 32.5 (90.5) | 33.6 (92.5) | 32.6 (90.7) | 30.4 (86.7) | 29.8 (85.6) | 30.4 (86.7) | 32.4 (90.3) | 30.1 (86.2) | 28.7 (83.7) | 30.8 (87.4) |
| Mean daily minimum °C (°F) | 16.7 (62.1) | 17.6 (63.7) | 20.7 (69.3) | 24.0 (75.2) | 26.9 (80.4) | 26.6 (79.9) | 25.3 (77.5) | 24.9 (76.8) | 24.3 (75.7) | 23.3 (73.9) | 20.7 (69.3) | 18.2 (64.8) | 22.4 (72.3) |
| Average rainfall mm (inches) | 0.1 (0.00) | 0.1 (0.00) | 0.1 (0.00) | 0.2 (0.01) | 9.4 (0.37) | 400.3 (15.76) | 665.8 (26.21) | 464.2 (18.28) | 254.2 (10.01) | 35.3 (1.39) | 18.9 (0.74) | 2.8 (0.11) | 1,718.6 (67.66) |
Source: Valsad - Central Ground Water Board

== Transport ==
Umargam is served by the Umargam Road railway station. It lies on the New Delhi–Mumbai main line.

== Education ==
=== List of schools ===
Affiliated with the State Board

- Chaudhary Charan Singh School
- M.K Mehta Gujarati School
- M.M High School
- Maa Vindwasini Hindi High School
- Sacred Heart English High School
- Saraswati Hindi High School
- Solsumba Central School
- Vinod P Mishra English Medium School

Affiliated with the CBSE

- Agratha Academy
- M.K Mehta High School & College
- S.S.V Gyan Kendra School

Institutions near Umargam

- Ace Onyx High School
- Bharti Academy High School
- CGSP College of Arts, Commerce & Science
- GES Pujya Chitre Guruji English Medium High School
- Laxmi Vidyapeeth
- Lokmanya Hindi High School
- M.B.B.I. Educational Academy & Mehernosh Junior College
- N.B Mehta Science & Commerce College
- Nation English High School & Junior College
- Pirojsha Godrej Junior Bordi College
- R.K. Desai College Of Commerce & Science
- Rofel Arts and Commerce College Vapi
- ROFEL Shri G.M. Bilakhia College of Pharmacy Vapi
- ROFEL Shri G.M.Bilakhia College of Applied Sciences Vapi
- Rustomjee Academy for Global Careers
- S.S.R College Of Arts, Commerce And Science

== In popular culture ==
Many television series and films have been shot in Umargam, including Ramayan, Mahabharat, Shani, Razia Sultan, Suryaputra Karn, Radhakrishn, Chandragupta Maurya, and Porus. and Shrimad Ramayan
