= Virar–Valsad Shuttle =

Train in India

Virar - Valsad Shuttle
Overview
- Service type: Passenger
- Current operator: Western Railway zone

Route
- Termini: Virar (VR); Valsad (BL)
- Stops: 16
- Distance travelled: 139 km (86 mi)
- Average journey time: 3 hrs
- Service frequency: Daily
- Train number: 59039

On-board services
- Class: Unreserved
- Seating arrangements: Yes
- Sleeping arrangements: No
- Catering facilities: No
- Entertainment facilities: No

Technical
- Rolling stock: Standard Indian Railway coaches
- Track gauge: 1,676 mm (5 ft 6 in)
- Operating speed: 46 km/h (29 mph)

The 59039 Virar - Valsad Shuttle is a passenger train of the Indian Railways connecting Virar in Maharashtra and Valsad of Gujarat. It is currently being operated with 59039 train number on a daily basis.

== Service ==
The 59039/Virar - Valsad Shuttle has average speed of 46 km/h and covers 139 km in 3 hrs.

== Route ==
The 59039/Virar - Valsad Shuttle runs from Virar via Dahanu Road, Umargam Road, Bhilad, Vapi, Udvada and Pardi to Valsad.

== Coach composite ==
The train consists of 18 coaches:

- 16 General Unreserved(GEN)
- 2 Seating cum Luggage Rake(SLR)

== Traction ==
Train is hauled by a Locomotive shed, Vadodara based WAP-5 or Locomotive shed, Valsad based WAG-5P.

== Rake sharing ==
The train shares its rake with 59037/59038 Virar - Surat Passenger, 59040 Vapi - Virar Shuttle, 59045 Bandra Terminus - Vapi Passenger, 59046 Valsad - Bandra Terminus Passenger.
