= Atul railway station =

Railway station in Gujarat, India

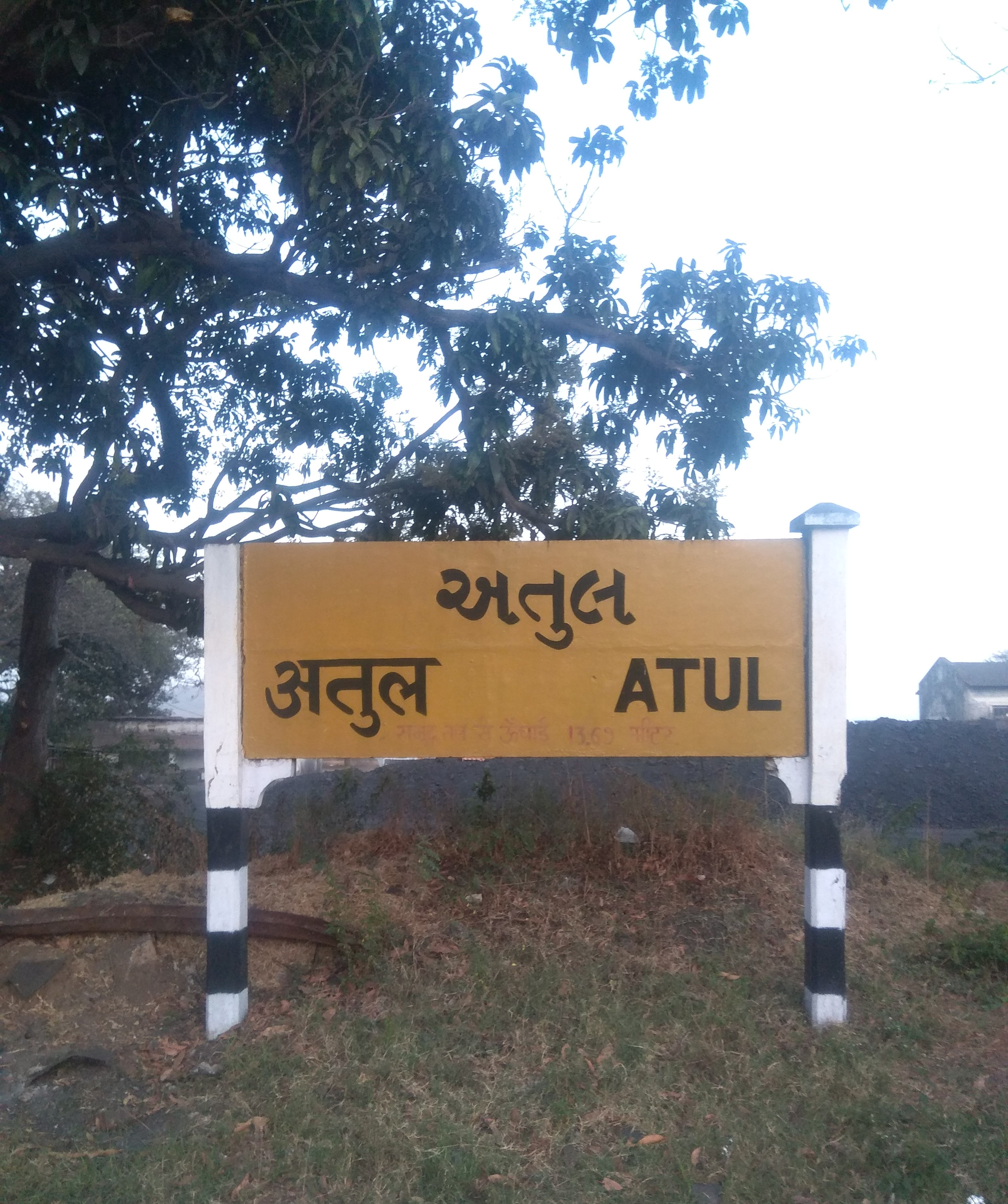

General information
- Location: Atul, Valsad district India
- Coordinates: 20°32′51″N 72°55′40″E
- Elevation: 13.690 metres (44.91 ft)
- System: Indian Railways station
- Owner: Ministry of Railways, Indian Railways
- Operator: Western Railway
- Lines: New Delhi–Mumbai main line Ahmedabad–Mumbai main line
- Platforms: 3
- Tracks: 3

Construction
- Structure type: Standard (on ground)
- Parking: No

Other information
- Status: Functioning
- Station code: ATUL
- Zone(s): Western Railway
- Division(s): Mumbai WR

Services
Preceding station	Indian Railways	Following station
Valsad towards ?	New Delhi–Mumbai main line	Pardi towards ?
Location
- Location within India Location within Gujarat

Atul railway station is a small railway station on the Western Railway network in the state of Gujarat, India. Atul is 'E' category railway station of Western Railway. Atul railway station is 7 km from Valsad railway station. Adjacent to Atul railway station is a coal yard. Passenger and MEMU trains halt here.

Western Railway AC Traction Sub-station is also located near Atul railway station.

== Nearby stations ==
Pardi is nearest railway station towards Mumbai, whereas Valsad is nearest railway station towards Surat.

Distance	Mumbai	Vapi	Udvada	Pardi	Atul	Valsad	Dungri	Bilimora	Amalsad	Navsari	Maroli	Surat
km	187	19	10	4	0	7	16	25	30	46	54	76

== Trains ==
- 59023/24 Valsad–Mumbai Central Fast Passenger
- 59037/38 Virar–Surat Passenger
- 69149/50 Virar–Bharuch MEMU
- 69141/42 Sanjan–Surat MEMU
- 59439/40 Mumbai Central–Ahmedabad Passenger
- 69153/54 Umargam Road–Valsad MEMU
- 09072 Valsad–Vapi Passenger Special (Note: Limited Period Running Train)
- 09069 Vapi–Surat Passenger Special (Note: Limited Period Running Train)
- 69139 Borivali–Surat MEMU
- 59039 Virar–Valsad Shuttle
- 59046 Valsad–Bandra Terminus Passenger
- 69140 Valsad–Virar MEMU (Note: Limited Period Running Train)

== See also ==
- Valsad district
