= Parnera Hill =

Human settlement in India

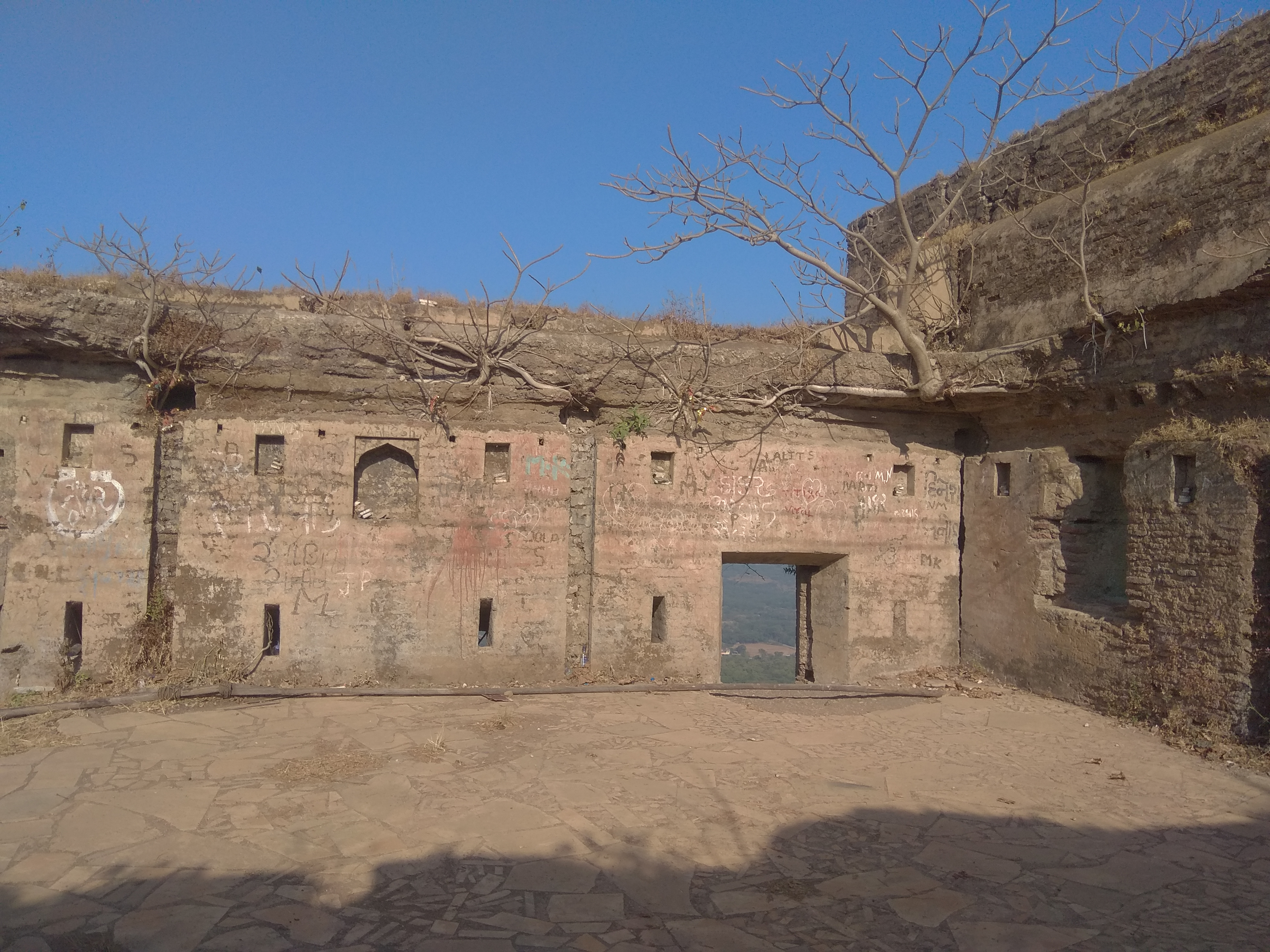
- Fort of Parnera, Valsad

Highest point
- Elevation: 152 m (499 ft)
- Coordinates: 20°32′58″N 72°56′53″E

Geography
- Location within India Location within Gujarat
- Location: Parnera, Gujarat

Geology
- Mountain type: Hill

Parnera Hill is situated in Parnera town of Valsad district, Gujarat, India. It is located around 6.5 km away from Valsad city and about 180 km away from Mumbai. The height of the hill from ground is around 152 metres (499 ft). It has two entries, one from Atul and the other from Parnera.

== History ==
As per known information, a Hindu king made a fort on the hill. Upon inspection of the fort's relics and structure, the use of skillful engineering methods of that time are apparent. The fort was under Dharampur State (called Ram Nagar State then) during the 15th century. Sultan Muhammad Shah Begda won this fort at the end of 15th century. In 16th century, the portuguese of Daman seized and destroyed this fort in 1558 and 1568.

Chhatrapati Shivaji Maharaj raided Surat twice, first in 1664 and again in 1670 when it was under Mughal rule. While returning after the raid, he and his men passed through the fort of the hill. A huge war reportedly took place, and according to folktale, Shivaji jumped out of a hidden passage of the fort with his horse during this war.

In 1696, a commander of Shivaji, Shree Moro Pandit, took possession of the fort and built a military base. It was an era of the mighty Peshwas of the Great Maratha Empire. But the golden era of the Peshwas came to a close eventually. In 1780, the fort came under the hand of Gayakwads of Vadodara. Later, Peshwa Balaji Bajirao 3rd attacked the fort. This fight lasted seven days. One poet has mentioned this fight's description in a garba titled Parnera ni lol. In 1780, the British took possession of the fort under the leadership of Lt. Wales and put military for handling the harassment of Pindharas. At the beginning of the 19th century, military was moved. During 1857's rebellion, the fort was demolished. Some relics still exist.

There are three stepwells on the hill. The military used water from them back in the days.

Three cannons remain at the fort. There were around 150 cannons at the fort during Indian independence. Some of them are now at the Valsad R.P.F. Ground.

== Temples ==
There are three temples at the top of Parnera Hill:

- Shree Maha Kali Mata Temple
- Shree Chandika, Shree Ambika, Shree Navdurga, Shree Sheetla Mata and Hanumanji Temple
- Swayambhu Rameshwar Mahadev Temple

Shree Maha Kali Mata Temple is situated on the top of Parnera Hill. In the south of the fort, there is a big rock with a cave. A statue of Shree Maha Kali Mata is inside the cave. There is also one archaeological temple on the hill, where statues of Goddesses Shree Chandika, Shree Ambika, Shree Navdurga and Shree Sheetla Mata are in the temple. There is also a temple of God Hanumanji in front of it. Swayambhu Rameshwar Mahadev Temple is also located near this temple.

Based on one folktale, the five goddesses, Shree Chandika, Shree Ambika, Shree Navdurga, Shree Sheetla and Shree Kalika stayed with each other here. Because of some reason, Goddess Kalika became sad, and went to the cave. Therefore, there are two temples on the hill. In every October, a huge fair is organized on Parnera Hill during Navratri.

== Mosque ==
Chand Pir Baba Dargah is situated on the top of Parnera Hill. Pir was martyred for the cause of truth and non-violence. During the fight, Pir's cut head fell in Parnera and Pir's body fell down Bilimora.

In remembrance of Pir's sacrifice, dargahs were made in Parnera and Bilimora. Based on one folktale, Pir's body was buried in Pardi's Chand Pir Shah Dargah.
