= Ancheli railway station =

Railway station in Gujarat, India

General information
- Location: Ancheli, Navsari district, Gujarat; India
- Coordinates: 20°50′42″N 72°56′43″E
- System: Indian Railways station
- Owner: Ministry of Railways, Indian Railways
- Operator: Western Railway
- Lines: New Delhi–Mumbai main line Ahmedabad–Mumbai main line
- Platforms: 2
- Tracks: 2

Construction
- Structure type: Ground
- Parking: No

Other information
- Status: Functioning
- Station code: ACL
- Zone(s): Western Railway
- Division(s): Mumbai WR

Services
Preceding station	Indian Railways	Following station
Vedchha towards ?	New Delhi–Mumbai main line	Amalsad towards ?
Location
- Location within India Location within Gujarat

Ancheli railway station is a small railway station on the Western Railway network in the state of Gujarat, India. Ancheli railway station is 12 km away from Navsari railway station. Passenger and MEMU trains halt here.

== Trains ==
- 59049/50 Valsad–Viramgam Passenger
- 59037/38 Virar–Surat Passenger
- 69149/50 Virar–Bharuch MEMU
- 69141/42 Sanjan–Surat MEMU
- 59439/40 Mumbai Central–Ahmedabad Passenger
- 59441/42 Ahmedabad–Mumbai Central Passenger
- 69151/52 Valsad–Surat MEMU
- 09069 Vapi–Surat Passenger Special (Note: Limited Period Running Train)
- 09070 Surat–Valsad MEMU Special (Note: Limited Period Running Train)
- 59048 Surat–Valsad Shuttle
- 69139 Borivali–Surat MEMU

== See also ==
- Navsari district
