= Bandra Terminus–Haridwar Express =

Train in India

Bandra Terminus–Haridwar Dehradun Express

Overview
- Service type: Mail/Express
- Locale: Maharashtra, Gujarat, Madhya Pradesh, Rajasthan, Haryana, Delhi, Uttar Pradesh & Uttarakhand
- First service: 1 October 1921; 104 years ago
- Current operator: Western Railways

Route
- Termini: Bandra Terminus (BDTS); Haridwar (HW)
- Stops: 65
- Distance travelled: 1,617 km (1,005 mi)
- Average journey time: 32 hours 15 minutes
- Service frequency: Daily
- Train number: 19019 / 19020

On-board services
- Classes: AC First Class, AC 2 Tier, AC 3 Tier, AC 3 Tier Economy, Sleeper Class
- Seating arrangements: Yes
- Sleeping arrangements: Yes
- Catering facilities: On-board catering, E-catering
- Observation facilities: Large windows

Technical
- Rolling stock: LHB coach
- Track gauge: 1,676 mm (5 ft 6 in)
- Operating speed: 110 km/h (68 mph) maximum, 42 km/h (26 mph) average including halts
Route map
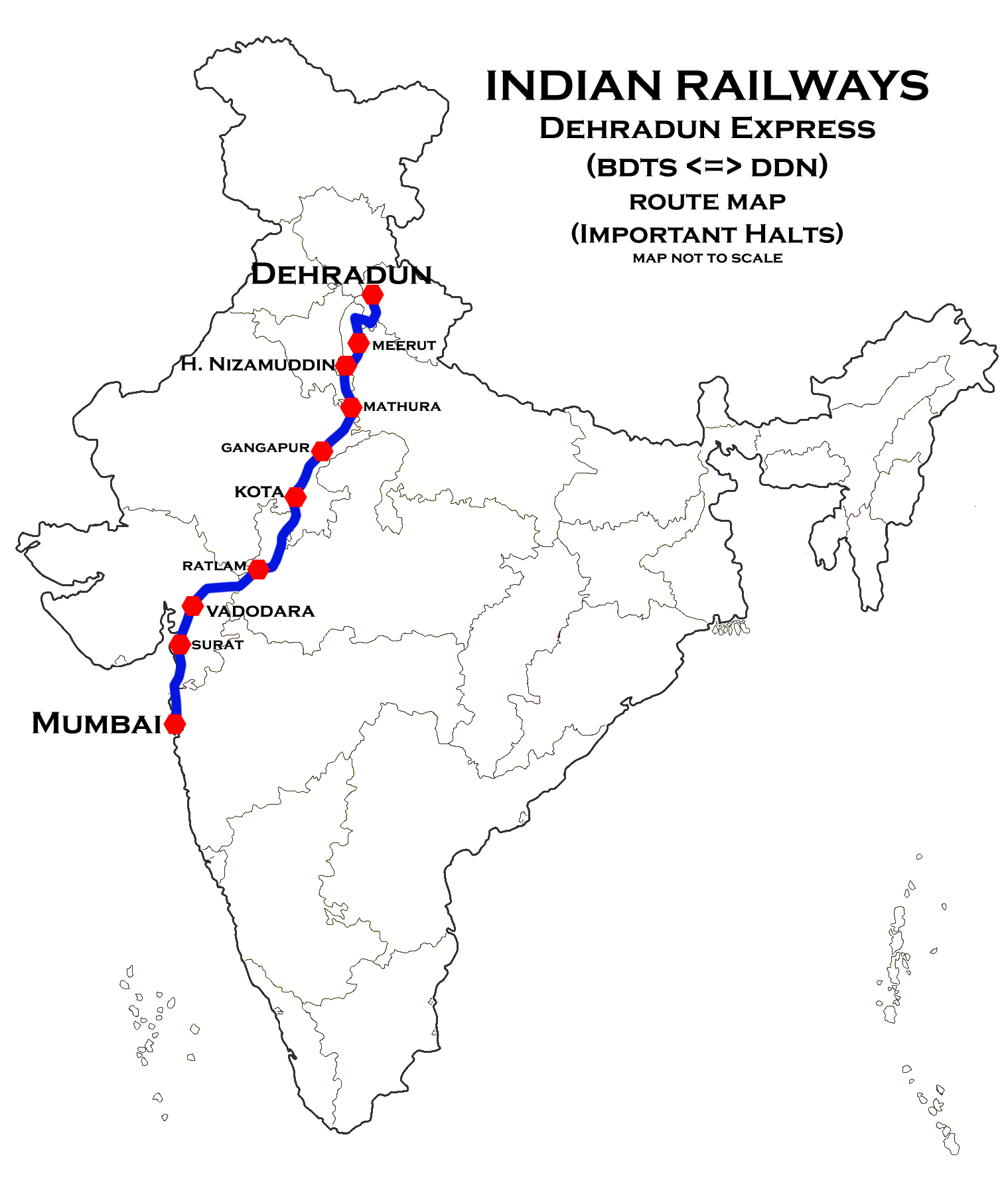

The 19019 / 19020 Bandra Terminus–Haridwar Dehradun Express is an express train of Indian Railways Western Railway Zone that runs between Bandra Terminus and Haridwar in India on a daily basis. Initially it ran between Dehradun and Bandra Terminus, but now it runs only between Haridwar and Bandra Terminus as Haridwar Express.

It operates as train number 19019 from Bandra Terminus to Haridwar and as train number 19020 in the reverse direction.

== History ==
The train started its service from 1st October 1921, as the Delhi Express, running between Colaba Terminus station, and Delhi. Following the introduction Frontier Mail, its route was extended till Peshawar (In present day Pakistan). It was operated with the same schedule as that of the older Northern Express (which was itself eventually renamed as the Frontier Mail later). The train was then renamed as Bombay-Punjab Express. After Independence, the train service was extended upto Meerut, and finally to Dehradun.

== Coaches ==
The train has standard ICF rakes with a maximum speed of 110 km/h. The train consists of 22 coaches:

- 1 AC First
- 2 AC Two Tier
- 6 AC Three tier
- 2 AC Three tier Economy
- 6 Sleeper Class
- 2 General Unreserved
- 1 Luggage Cum Disabled Coaches
- 1 Generator Car
- 1 High Capacity Parcel Van

== Coach position ==
The train consists of 22 coaches.

Loco	HCPV	SLR	H1	A1	A2	B1	B2	B3	B4	B5	B6	M1	M2	S1	S2	S3	S4	S5	S6	UR	UR	EOG

== Service ==
It is a daily train and covers the distance of 1617 kilometres in 32 hours 15 mins as 19019 Dehradun Express (40.53 km/h) and 32 hours 45 mins as 19020 Dehradun Express (40.29 km/h).

== Traction ==
Before the Mumbai region changed traction to an AC system, Valsad based WCAM-1 engine would haul the train until Vadodara from where a Vadodara-based WAP-4 or WAP-5 would take over until Hazrat Nizamuddin after which a WDM-3A engine from the Tuglakabad shed would take over until Haridwar.

Since Western Railways switched over to AC traction, a Ghaziabad-based WAP-7 hauls the train until Hazrat Nizamuddin after which a WDM-3A engine from the Tuglakabad shed takes over until Haridwar.

Now, both trains are hauled by a Vadodara/Valsad-based WAP-7 until Haridwar and vice versa.

== Schedule ==
- 19019 Bandra Terminus–Haridwar Dehradun Express leaves Bandra Terminus every day at 00:05AM IST and reaches Haridwar at 08:20AM IST on the next day.
- 19020 Haridwar–Bandra Terminus Dehradun Express leaves Haridwar every day at 01:30PM IST and reaches Bandra Terminus at 10:15PM IST on the next day.

== Route and halts ==
The important halts of the train are:

- Bandra Terminus
- Borivali
- Vapi
- Valsad
- Bilimora
- Navsari
- Surat
- Bharuch Junction
- Vadodara Junction
- Ratlam Junction
- Kota Junction
- Sawai Madhopur Junction
- Mathura Junction
- Hazrat Nizamuddin
- Ghaziabad Junction
- Meerut City
- Muzaffarnagar
- Saharanpur Junction
- Roorkee
- Laksar Junction
- Haridwar

== Incidents ==
On 8 January 2014, a fire broke out on one of the trains when it was near Dahanu station in Maharashtra. Three carriages were involved. Some passengers escaped "by breaking open the back doors" but nine were killed.

== Gallery ==
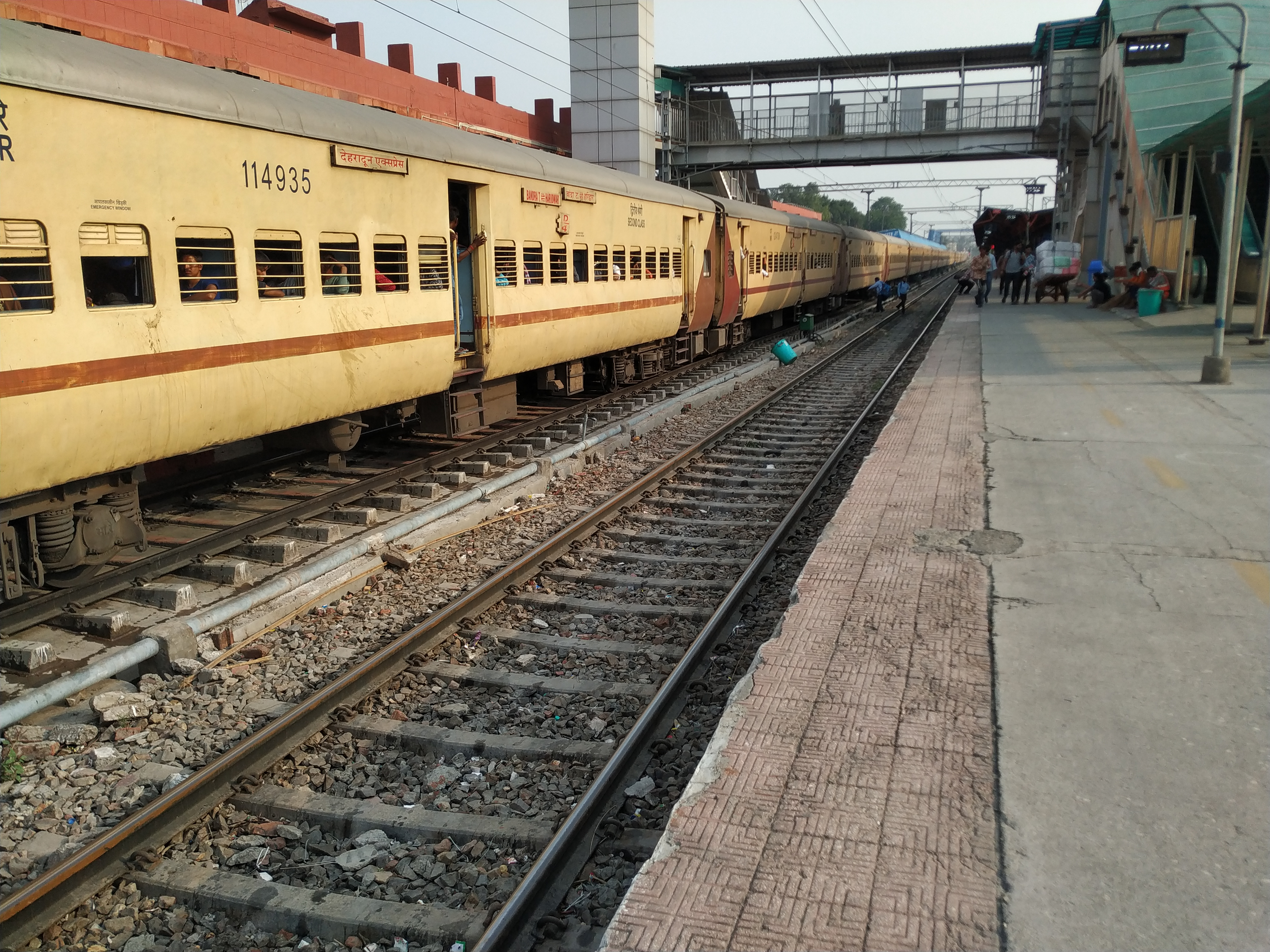
19020 Dehradun Express on Platform 1 of Meerut City

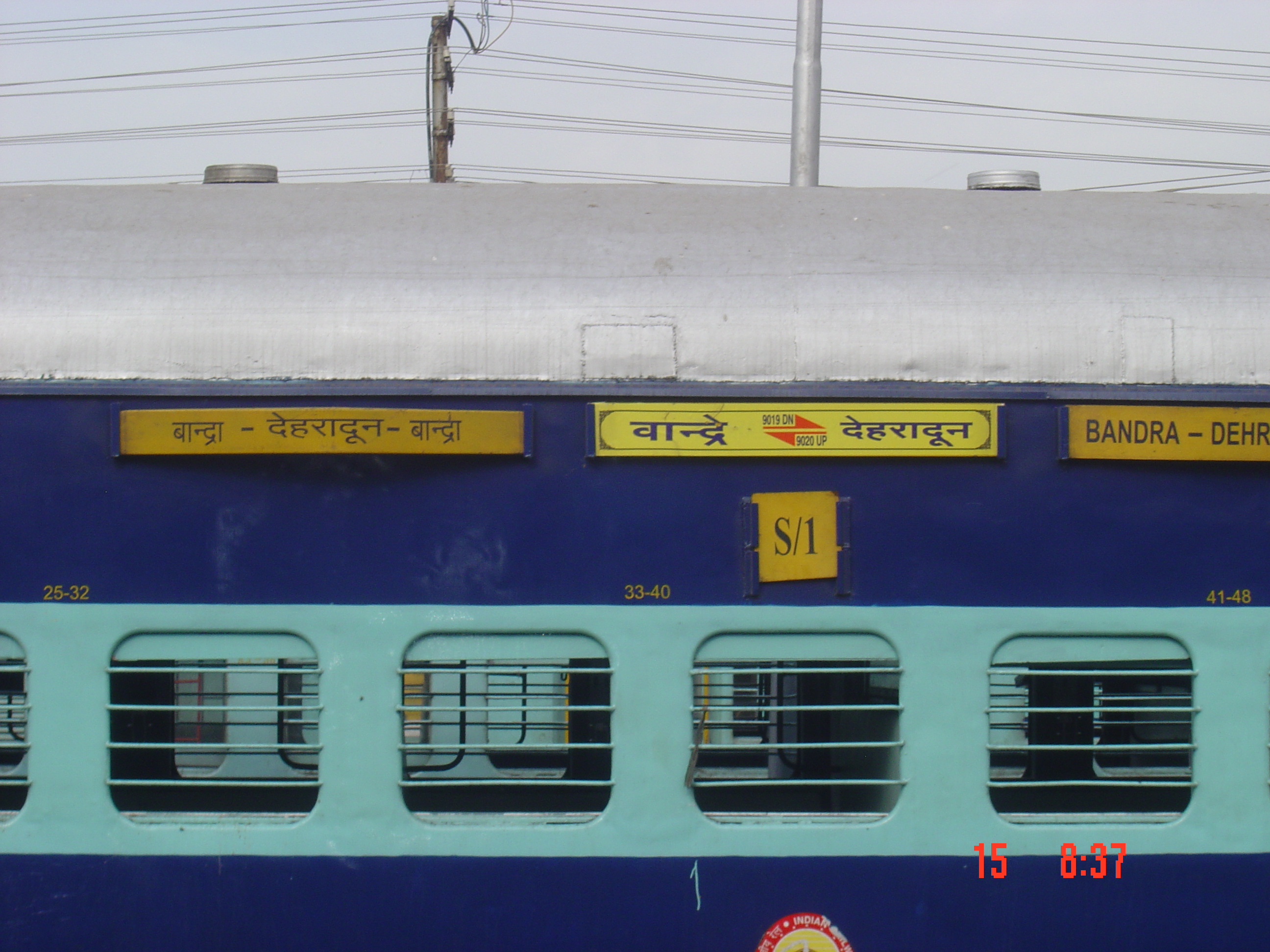
19019 Dehradun Express
