= Valsad–Bandra Terminus Passenger =

Train in India

Valsad - Bandra Terminus Passenger
Overview
- Service type: Passenger
- Current operator(s): Western Railway zone

Route
- Termini: Valsad (BL); Bandra Terminus (BDTS)
- Stops: 21
- Distance travelled: 183 km (114 mi)
- Average journey time: 4 hrs 40 mins
- Service frequency: Daily
- Train number(s): 59046

On-board services
- Class(es): Unreserved
- Seating arrangements: Yes
- Sleeping arrangements: No
- Catering facilities: No
- Entertainment facilities: No

Technical
- Rolling stock: Standard Indian Railway coaches
- Track gauge: 1,676 mm (5 ft 6 in)
- Operating speed: 39 km/h (24 mph)

The 59046 Valsad - Bandra Terminus Passenger is a passenger train of the Indian Railways connecting Valsad in Gujarat and Bandra Terminus of Maharashtra. It is currently being operated with 59046 train number on a daily basis.

== Service ==
The 59046/Valsad - Bandra Terminus Passenger has average speed of 39 km/h and covers 183 km in 4 hrs 40 mins.

== Route ==
The 59046/Valsad - Bandra Terminus Passenger runs from Valsad via Vapi, Dahanu Road, Palghar, Virar, Vasai Road, Borivali and Andheri to Bandra Terminus.

== Coach composite ==
The train consists of 18 coaches:

- 16 General Unreserved(GEN)
- 2 Seating cum Luggage Rake(SLR)

== Traction ==
Train is hauled by a Locomotive shed, Vadodara based WAP-4 or Locomotive shed, Valsad based WAG-5B.

== Rake sharing ==
The train shares its rake with 59037/59038 Virar - Surat Passenger, 59039 Virar - Valsad Shuttle, 59040 Vapi - Virar Shuttle, 59045 Bandra Terminus - Vapi Passenger.
