= Bandra Terminus–Vapi Passenger =

Train in India

Bandra Terminus Vapi Passenger
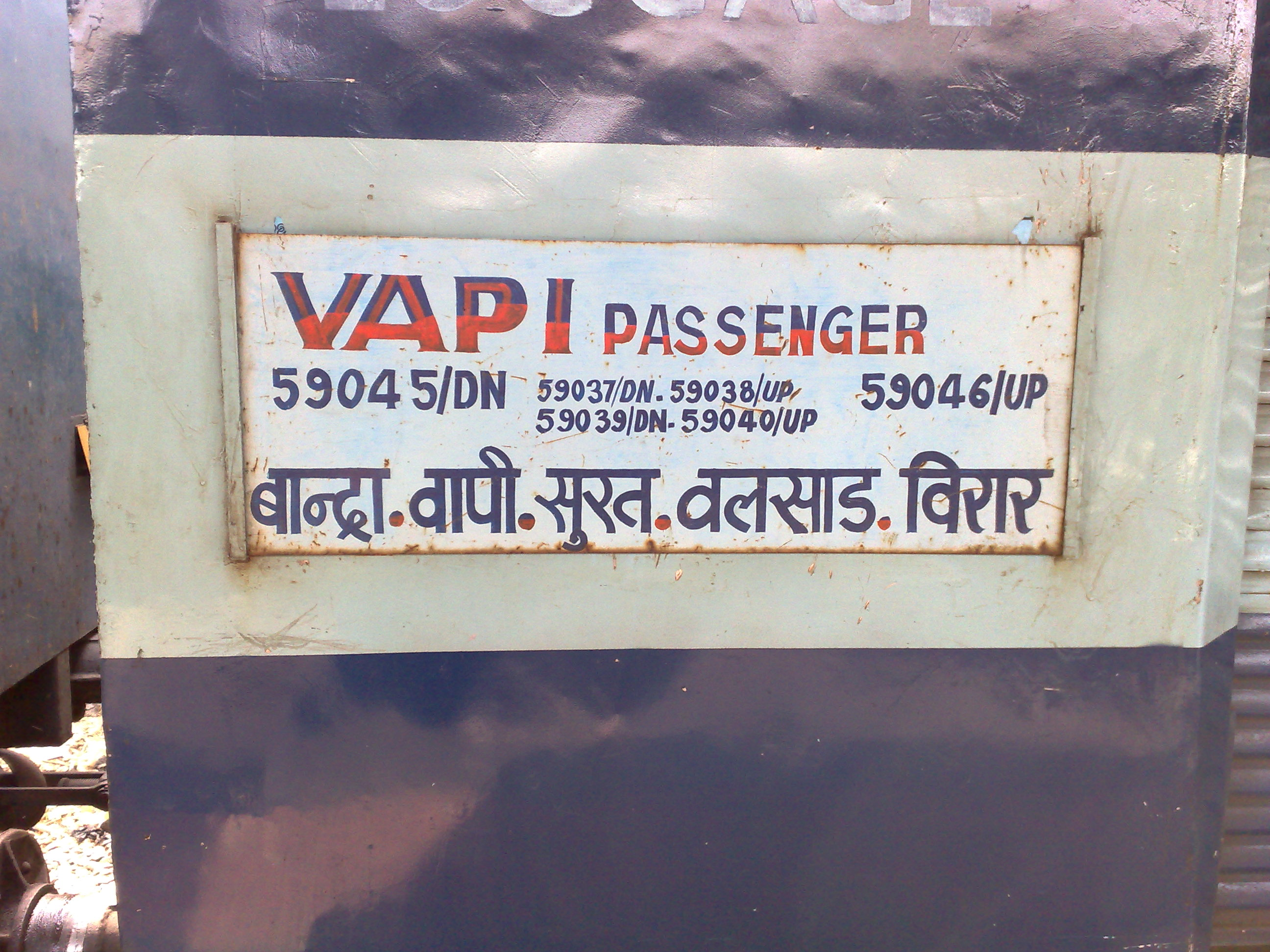

Overview
- Service type: Passenger
- Current operator: Western Railways

Route
- Termini: Bandra Terminus; Vapi
- Stops: 18
- Distance travelled: 159 km (99 mi)
- Average journey time: 03 hours 50 minutes as 59045 Bandra Terminus Vapi Passenger
- Service frequency: Daily
- Train number: 59045

On-board services
- Classes: First Class, 2nd Class seating, General Unreserved
- Seating arrangements: Yes
- Sleeping arrangements: No
- Catering facilities: No Pantry car coach attached
- Observation facilities: Multiple Rake Sharing arrangements

Technical
- Rolling stock: Standard Indian Railways coaches
- Track gauge: 1,676 mm (5 ft 6 in)
- Operating speed: 110 km/h (68 mph) maximum 41.48 km/h (26 mph) including halts

The 59045 Bandra Terminus Vapi Passenger was a Passenger train belonging to Indian Railways - Western Railway zone that ran between Bandra Terminus and Vapi in India.

It operated as train number 59045 from Bandra Terminus to Vapi serving the states of Maharashtra and Gujarat.

== Coaches ==
The 59045 Bandra Terminus Vapi Passenger earlter was used to have Flying Ranee Express (Non AC ICF Double Decker) coach it was upgraded to LHB coach and it had 2 First Class, 2 Second Class seating, 14 General Unreserved, 2 SLR (Seating cum Luggage Rake) coaches and up to 3 High Capacity Parcel Vans. It did not carry a Pantry car coach.

== Service ==
The 59045 Bandra Terminus Vapi Passenger covers the distance of 159 kilometres in 3 hours 50 mins (41.48 km/h).

== Routeing ==
The 59045 Bandra Terminus Vapi Passenger runs from Bandra Terminus via Andheri, Virar, Kelve Road, Sanjan to Vapi.

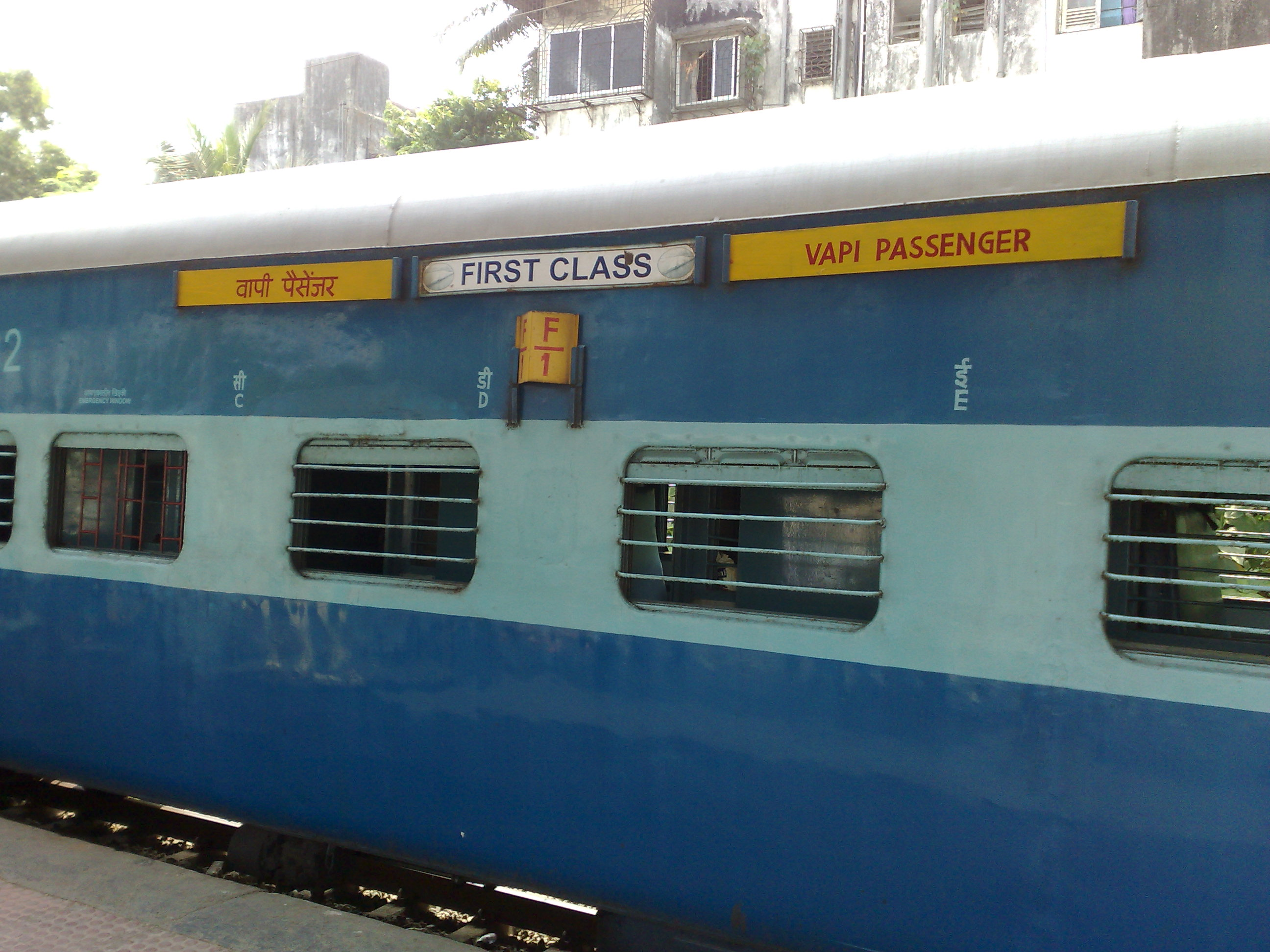
Bandra Terminus Vapi Passenger - First Class coach

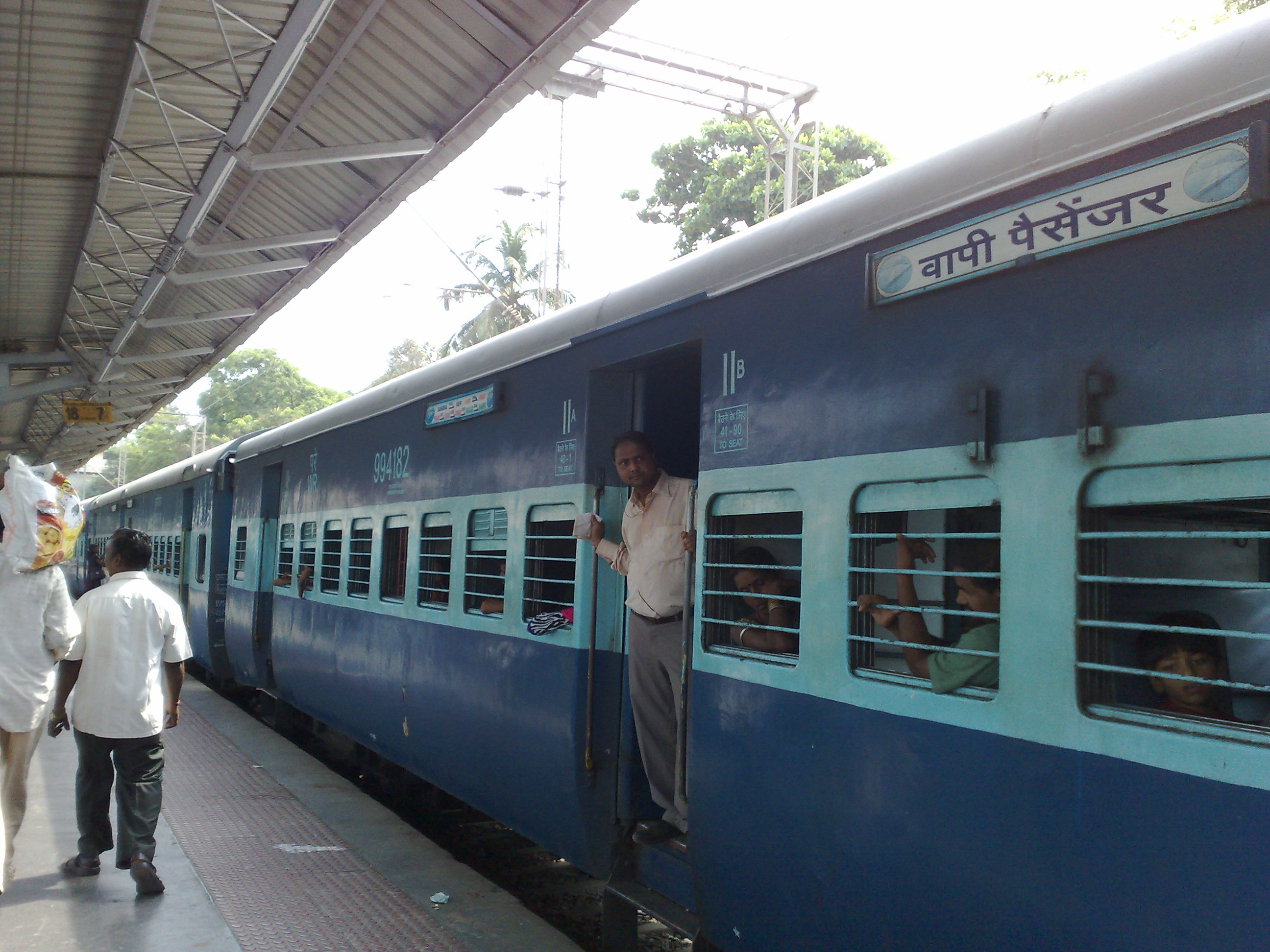
Bandra Terminus Vapi Passenger - Second Class coach

== Traction ==
As the route is fully electrified, a Valsad Electric Loco Shed-based WCAM 1 or on occasion Vadodara Electric Loco Shed-based WAP 5 powers the train for its entire journey.

== Rake sharing ==
The train shares its rake with 59037/59038 Virar - Surat Passenger, 59039 Virar - Valsad Shuttle, 59040 Vapi - Virar Shuttle, 59046 Valsad - Bandra Terminus Passenger.

== Timings ==
59045 Bandra Terminus Vapi Passenger leaves Bandra Terminus on a daily basis at 09:25 hrs IST and reaches Vapi at 13:15 hrs IST on the same day.
