= Bandra Terminus–Bhagat Ki Kothi Humsafar Express =

Bandra Terminus - Bhagat Ki Kothi Humsafar Express

Overview
- Service type: Humsafar Express
- First service: 7 June 2018; 7 years ago
- Current operator(s): Western Railways

Route
- Termini: Bandra Terminus (BDTS); Bhagat Ki Kothi (BGKT)
- Stops: 8
- Distance travelled: 933.4 km (580 mi)
- Average journey time: 17 hours 05 mins
- Service frequency: Weekly (Note: Runs once in a week for every direction.)
- Train number(s): 20943 / 20944

On-board services
- Class(es): AC 3 tier
- Seating arrangements: Yes
- Sleeping arrangements: Yes
- Catering facilities: Available
- Observation facilities: Large windows

Technical
- Rolling stock: LHB Humsafar
- Track gauge: 1,676 mm (5 ft 6 in)
- Operating speed: 55 km/h (34 mph)
Route map
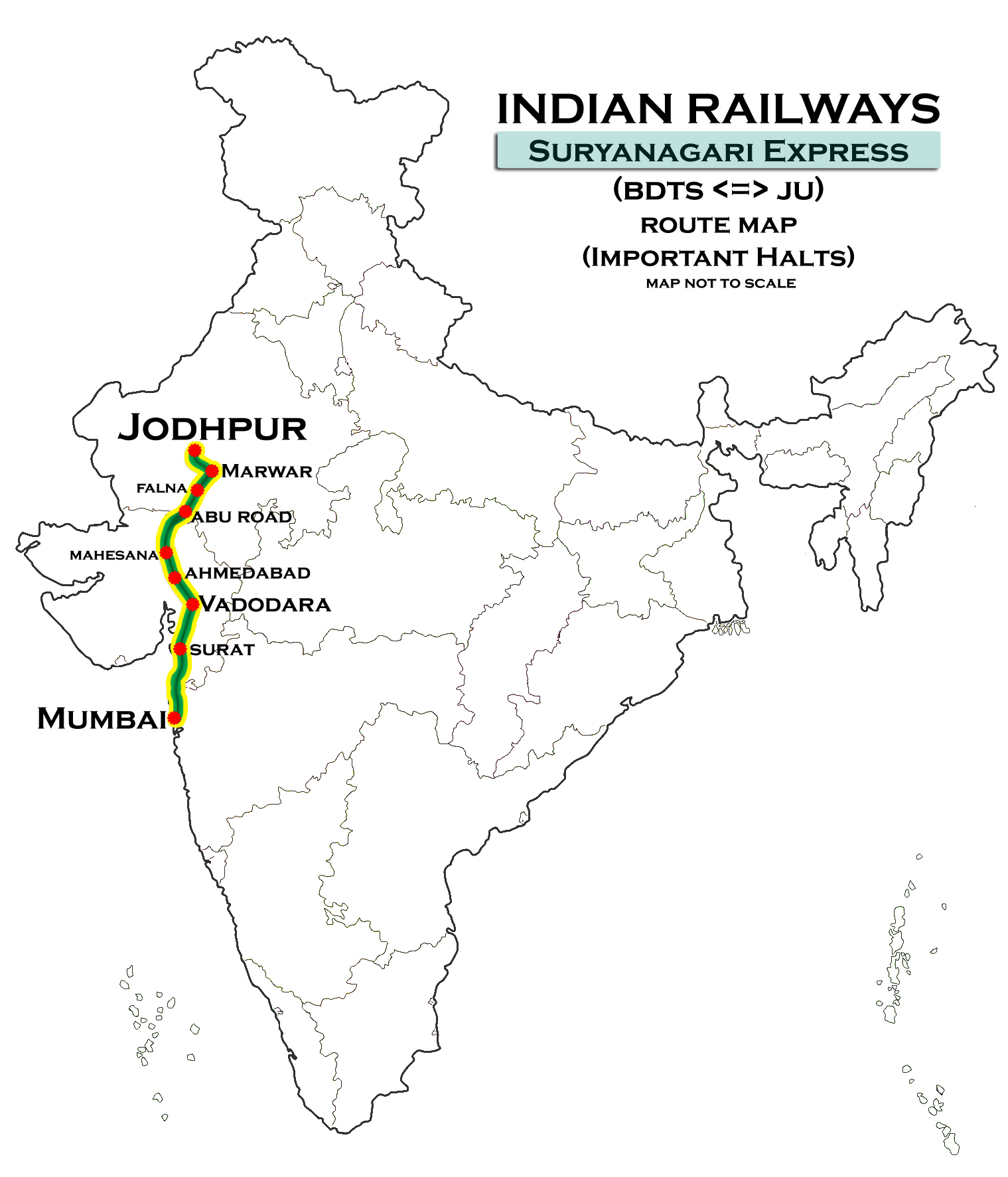

The 20943 / 20944 Bandra Terminus - Bhagat Ki Kothi Humsafar Express is an express train belonging to Western Railway zone that runs between Bandra Terminus and Bhagat Ki Kothi. It is currently being operated with 20943/20944 train numbers on a weekly basis.

== Coach composition ==
The trains is completely 3-tier AC sleeper trains designed by Indian Railways with features of LED screen display to show information about stations, train speed etc. and will have announcement system as well, Vending machines for tea, coffee and milk, Bio toilets in compartments as well as CCTV cameras.

== Service ==
The 20943/Bandra Terminus - Bhagat ki Kothi Humsafar Express has an average speed of 55 km/h and covers 933.4 km in 17h 05m.

The 20944/Bhagat ki Kothi - Bandra Terminus Humsafar Express has an average speed of 54 km/h and covers 933.4 km in 16h 50m.

== Traction ==
Both trains are hauled by a Vadodara based WAP 5 / WAP 7 HOG Equipped locomotive from BDTS to BGKT and vice-versa.

== Route and halts ==
The important halts of the train are:

- Bandra Terminus
- Borivali
- Vapi
- Surat
- Vadodara Junction
- Ahmedabad Junction
- Palanpur
- Abu Road
- Pali Marwar
- Bhagat Ki Kothi

== Schedule ==
Train Number	Station Code	Departure Station	Departure Time	Departure Day	Arrival Station	Arrival Time	Arrival Day
20943	BDTS	Bandra Terminus	21:40 PM	Thu	Bhagat Ki Kothi	14:45 PM	Fri
20944	BGKT	Bhagat Ki Kothi	16:30 PM	Fri	Bandra Terminus	09:20 AM	Sat

== Rake sharing ==
The train shares its rake with 22913/22914 Bandra Terminus - Saharsa Humsafar Express.

== See also ==
- Humsafar Express
- Bandra Terminus railway station
- Bhagat Ki Kothi railway station
