= Bagwada railway station =

Railway station in Gujarat

General information
- Location: Bagwada, Valsad district, Gujarat; India
- Coordinates: 20°26′02″N 72°54′58″E
- System: Indian Railways station
- Owner: Ministry of Railways, Indian Railways
- Operator: Western Railway
- Lines: New Delhi–Mumbai main line Ahmedabad–Mumbai main line
- Platforms: 2
- Tracks: 2

Construction
- Structure type: Ground
- Parking: No

Other information
- Status: Functioning
- Station code: BAGD
- Zone(s): Western Railway
- Division(s): Mumbai WR

Services
Preceding station	Indian Railways	Following station
Udvada towards ?	New Delhi–Mumbai main line	Vapi towards ?
Location
- Location within India Location within Gujarat

Bagwada railway station is a small railway station on the Western Railway network in the state of Gujarat, India. Bagwada railway station is 20 km away from Valsad railway station. Passenger and MEMU trains halt here.

== Trains ==
- 69149/50 Virar–Bharuch MEMU
- 69141/42 Sanjan–Surat MEMU
- 59439/40 Mumbai Central–Ahmedabad Passenger

== See also ==
- Valsad district
