= Amalsad railway station =

Railway station in Gujarat, India

Amalsad

General information
- Location: Amalsad, Gujarat; India
- Coordinates: 20°48′41″N 72°57′21″E
- Elevation: 14 metres (46 ft)
- System: Indian Railways station
- Owner: Ministry of Railways, Indian Railways
- Operator: Western Railway
- Lines: New Delhi–Mumbai main line Ahmedabad–Mumbai main line
- Platforms: 3
- Tracks: 3

Construction
- Structure type: Standard (on ground)
- Parking: Yes

Other information
- Status: Functioning
- Station code: AML
- Zone(s): Western Railway
- Division(s): Mumbai WR

Services
Preceding station	Indian Railways	Following station
Ancheli towards ?	New Delhi–Mumbai main line	Bilimora Junction towards ?
Location
- Location within India Location within Gujarat

Amalsad railway station is a railway station on the Western Railway network in the state of Gujarat, India. Amalsad railway station is 16 km far away from Navsari railway station. Passenger, MEMU and few Express/Superfast trains halt at Amalsad railway station.

== Major trains ==
Following Express & Superfast trains halt at Amalsad railway station in both direction:

- 19033/34 Gujarat Queen
- 12929/30 Valsad–Vadodara Intercity Superfast Express
- 19015/16 Mumbai Central–Porbandar Saurashtra Express
- 12921/22 Flying Ranee

== See also ==
- Navsari district
