= Date palm farming in Rajasthan =

Date palm farming in Rajasthan was started in 2007. Rajasthan grows date palm varieties like Barhee, Khuneji, Khalas, Medjool, Khadravi, Jamli and Sagai. India imports 38% of world's production of Date palm. Rajasthan produced nearly 800 tonnes of date palm from the first harvest in 2015–16.

== See also ==
- Atul (company)
- Date palm farming in Gujarat
- Agriculture in India
