= Vapi–Virar Shuttle =

Indian train route

Vapi - Virar Shuttle
Overview
- Service type: Passenger
- Current operator: Western Railway zone

Route
- Termini: Vapi (VAPI); Virar (VR)
- Stops: 12
- Distance travelled: 113 km (70 mi)
- Average journey time: 2 hrs 20 mins
- Service frequency: Daily
- Train number: 59040

On-board services
- Class: Unreserved
- Seating arrangements: Yes
- Sleeping arrangements: No
- Catering facilities: No
- Entertainment facilities: No

Technical
- Rolling stock: Standard Indian Railway coaches
- Track gauge: 1,676 mm (5 ft 6 in)
- Operating speed: 48 km/h (30 mph)

The 59040 Vapi - Virar Shuttle is a passenger train of the Indian Railways connecting Vapi in Gujarat and Virar of Maharashtra. It is currently being operated with 59040 train number on a daily basis.

== Service ==
The 59040/Vapi - Virar Shuttle has average speed of 48 km/h and covers 113 km in 2 hrs 20 mins.

== Route ==
The 59040/Vapi - Virar Shuttle runs from Vapi via Umargam Road, Dahanu Road, Palghar and Saphale to Virar.

== Coach composite ==
The train consists of 18 coaches:

- 16 General Unreserved(GEN)
- 2 Seating cum Luggage Rake(SLR)

== Traction ==
Train is hauled by a Locomotive shed, Vadodara based WAP-5 or Locomotive shed, Valsad based WAG-5P.

== Rake sharing ==
The train shares its rake with 59037/59038 Virar - Surat Passenger, 59039 Virar - Valsad Shuttle, 59045 Bandra Terminus - Vapi Passenger, 59046 Valsad - Bandra Terminus Passenger.
