= Vedchha railway station =

Railway station in Gujarat, India

General information
- Location: Vedchha, Navsari district, Gujarat; India
- Coordinates: 20°52′28″N 72°56′11″E
- System: Indian Railways station
- Owner: Ministry of Railways, Indian Railways
- Operator: Western Railway
- Lines: New Delhi–Mumbai main line Ahmedabad–Mumbai main line
- Platforms: 3
- Tracks: 6

Construction
- Structure type: Standard (on ground)
- Parking: Yes

Other information
- Status: Functioning
- Station code: VDH
- Zone(s): Western Railway
- Division(s): Mumbai WR

Services
Preceding station	Indian Railways	Following station
Gandhi Smriti towards ?	New Delhi–Mumbai main line	Ancheli towards ?
Location
- Location within India Location within Gujarat

Vedchha railway station is a small railway station on the Western Railway network in the state of Gujarat, India. Vedchha railway station is near Navsari railway station. Passenger and MEMU trains halt here.

In the early 1960s the area immediately around the station was undeveloped but it contributed to the development of the cotton industry in the nearby town of Abrama.

== See also ==
- Navsari district
