= Bandra Terminus–Bikaner AC Superfast Express =

Bandra Terminus – Bikaner Junction AC Superfast Express

Overview
- Service type: AC Express
- Status: Operating
- Locale: Maharashtra, Gujrat and Rajasthan
- First service: 22 May 2025 (inaugural); 26 May 2025 (commercial)
- Current operator: Western Railway zone

Route
- Termini: Bandra Terminus (BDTS); Bikaner Junction (BKN)
- Distance travelled: 1,214 km (754 mi)
- Service frequency: Weekly
- Train number: 21903/21904

On-board services
- Classes: AC Chair Car, AC 3 tier economy
- Seating arrangements: Yes
- Sleeping arrangements: Yes
- Auto-rack arrangements: No
- Observation facilities: Large windows
- Baggage facilities: Below the seats

Technical
- Rolling stock: LHB coach
- Track gauge: 1,676 mm (5 ft 6 in)

The 21903 / 21904 Bandra Terminus - Bikaner AC Superfast Express is an air-conditioned express train of the Western Railway zone in Indian Railways. It runs on a weekly basis between Bandra Terminus station in Mumbai and Bikaner Junction station in Bikaner, passing through the states of Maharashtra, Gujarat and Rajasthan. It was inaugurated on 22 May 2025.

== Coach composition ==
The train runs with 22 Linke-Hoffman Busch coaches; of which 18 are AC 3-Tier Economy coaches (3E), (Note: These coaches use the "M" prefix.) 2 are AC Chair Car (CC) coaches and 2 are Generator cars (EOG). It has a single rake, which it shares with the Bandra Terminus-Hazrat Nizamuddin Yuva Express. The primary maintenance is executed at Bandra Terminus.

Legends
| EOG/SLR | PC | MIL | H | A | HA | B | AB | G | K | E | C | S | D | GEN/UR |
|---|---|---|---|---|---|---|---|---|---|---|---|---|---|---|
| Generator cum luggage van | Pantry car or Hot buffet car | Military coach | First AC (1A) | Second AC (2A) | First AC cum Second AC | Third AC (3A) | Third AC cum Second AC | Third AC economy (3E) | Anubhuti coach (K) | Executive chair car (EC) | AC Chair car (CC) | Sleeper class (SL) | Second seating (2S) | General or Unreserved |
| | Loco and other service coach | | | | | | | | | | | | | |
| | AC coach | | | | | | | | | | | | | |
| | Non-AC coach | | | | | | | | | | | | | |

Coach position of 21903 (ex. Bandra Terminus)

| Loco | 1 | 2 | 3 | 4 | 5 | 6 | 7 | 8 | 9 | 10 | 11 | 12 | 13 | 14 | 15 | 16 | 17 | 18 | 19 | 20 | 21 | 22 |
|---|---|---|---|---|---|---|---|---|---|---|---|---|---|---|---|---|---|---|---|---|---|---|
| | EOG | C2 | C1 | M18 | M17 | M16 | M15 | M14 | M13 | M12 | M11 | M10 | M9 | M8 | M7 | M6 | M5 | M4 | M3 | M2 | M1 | EOG |

Coach position of 21904 (ex. Bikaner)

| Loco | 1 | 2 | 3 | 4 | 5 | 6 | 7 | 8 | 9 | 10 | 11 | 12 | 13 | 14 | 15 | 16 | 17 | 18 | 19 | 20 | 21 | 22 |
|---|---|---|---|---|---|---|---|---|---|---|---|---|---|---|---|---|---|---|---|---|---|---|
| | EOG | M1 | M2 | M3 | M4 | M5 | M6 | M7 | M8 | M9 | M10 | M11 | M12 | M13 | M14 | M15 | M16 | M17 | M18 | C1 | C2 | EOG |

Passengers are advised to check the coach position indicator at the station before boarding.

== Service ==
- The 21903 Bandra Terminus - Bikaner AC Superfast Express leaves Bandra Terminus at 23:25 hrs every Monday and reaches Bikaner Junction the next day at 20:40 hrs. It takes 21 hrs and 15 min to complete it journey, averaging at 57 km/h (35 mph).
- The 21904 Bikaner - Bandra Terminus AC Superfast Express leaves Bikaner Junction at 08:50 hrs every Wednesday and arrives at Bandra Terminus the next day at 06:45 hrs. It takes 21 hrs and 55 min to complete its journey, averaging at 55 km/h (34 mph).
- The maximum speed of this train is 130 km/h (81 mph). Since its average speed is over 55 km/h (34 mph), the fare includes a superfast surcharge.

== Traction ==
Since the route is fully electrified, the train is hauled by a Vadodara based WAP 7 locomotive end to end.

== Route and halts ==
The train travels the entirety of the Mumbai–Ahmedabad main line, after which it takes the Jaipur-Ahmedabad line till Marwar Junction. From there, it follows the Marwar Junction-Munabao line till Luni Junction, a non-stopping station. From here, the train diverges towards Jodhpur and then follows the Jodhpur-Bathinda line till its destination. The stoppages are:-

- Bandra Terminus (start)
- Borivali
- Vapi
- Surat
- Bharuch Junction
- Vadodara Junction
- Anand Junction
- Nadiad Junction
- Sabarmati
- Mahesana Junction
- Palanpur Junction
- Abu Road
- Falna
- Marwar Junction
- Pali Marwar
- Jodhpur
- Merta Road Junction
- Nagaur
- Nokha
- Deshnoke
- Bikaner Junction (end)
