= Parnera =

- town
- Location in Gujarat, India Parnera (India)
- Coordinates: 20.55°N 72.95°E
- Country: India
- State: Gujarat
- District: Valsad

Population (2001)
  - Total: 10,713

Languages
  - Official: Gujarati, Hindi
- Time zone: UTC+5:30 (IST)
- PIN: 396020
- Vehicle registration: GJ
- Website: gujaratindia.com

Parnera is a census town in Valsad district in the Indian state of Gujarat.

== Geography ==
Parnera is located at 20.55°N 72.95°E. It has an average elevation of 44 metres (144 feet).

== Demographics ==
As of 2001 India census, Parnera had a population of 10,713. Males constitute 54% of the population and females 46%. Parnera has an average literacy rate of 79%, higher than the national average of 59.5%: male literacy is 85%, and female literacy is 72%. In Parnera, 10% of the population is under 6 years of age.

== Tourism ==
Nearby the village, there is Parnera Hill. Every October a fair is organized there.
