= Gandhi Smriti railway station =

Railway station in Gujarat, India

General information
- Location: Navsari, Navsari district, Gujarat; India
- Coordinates: 20°55′14″N 72°55′19″E
- System: Indian Railways station
- Owner: Ministry of Railways, Indian Railways
- Operator: Western Railway
- Lines: New Delhi–Mumbai main line Ahmedabad–Mumbai main line
- Platforms: 2
- Tracks: 2

Construction
- Structure type: Ground
- Parking: No

Other information
- Status: Functioning
- Station code: GNST
- Zone(s): Western Railway
- Division(s): Mumbai WR

Services
Preceding station	Indian Railways	Following station
Navsari towards ?	New Delhi–Mumbai main line	Vedchha towards ?
Location
- Location within India Location within Gujarat

Gandhi Smriti railway station is a small railway station on the Western Railway network in the state of Gujarat, India. Gandhi Smriti railway station is 3 km away from Navsari railway station. Passenger and MEMU trains halt here.

== History ==
There is a railway gate between Navsari and Dandi on the way to Dandi. It is mostly closed due to high traffic. Gandhi Smriti railway station is located right next to it. Gandhi Smriti railway station is associated with Gandhiji's memories. Therefore, it is named as "Gandhi Smriti".

After the Dandi March started from Sabarmati Ashram on 12 March 1930, Gandhiji spent 14 April to 4 May in a hut built under a plum tree in Karadi village near Dandi. He now had to travel from Karadi to the salt field of Dharasana. The British police arrested him from Karadi on 4 May. Gandhiji was brought from Karadi to Hansapore. Frontier Mail was stopped at 1.30 in the night to take it by train to Mumbai. The surrounding villages had fought in memory of that day and as a result "Gandhi Smriti railway station" was started on 15 August 1997.

== See also ==
- Navsari district
