= 2024 Mumbai crowd crush =

2024 crowd crush at Bandra Terminus Railway Station, Mumbai

Mumbai Bandra Terminus crowd crush
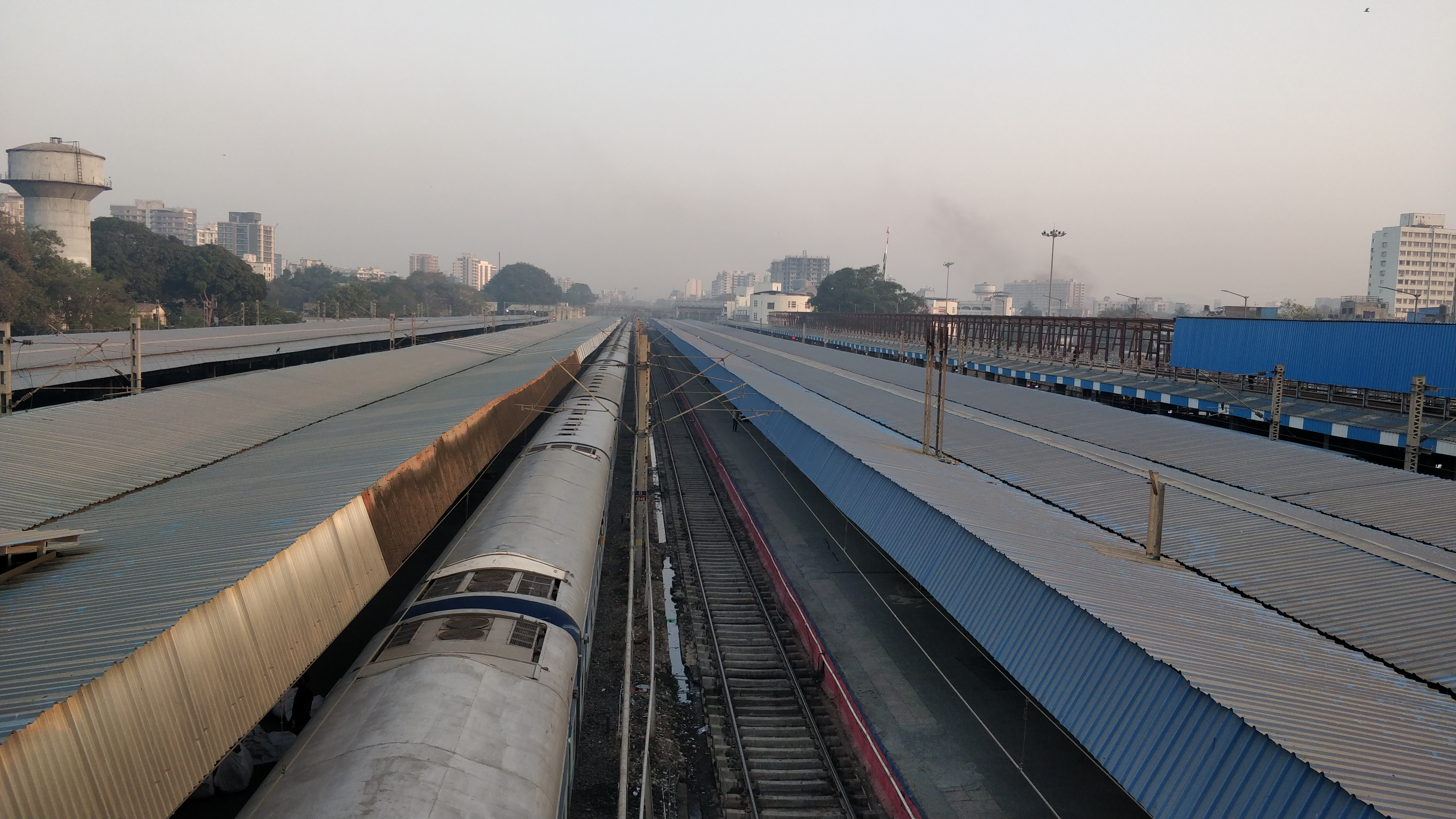
- Bandra Terminus, where the crowd crush occurred
- Date: 27 October 2024
- Time: 05:20a.m. (IST)
- Location: Bandra Terminus, Mumbai, India; 19.062644°N 72.841089°E
- Cause: Overcrowding on platform during train boarding
- Outcome: Safety audits announced for high-density stations
- Deaths: 0
- Injuries: 9 (2 critical)
- Inquiries: Official investigation by the Ministry of Railways

On 27 October 2024, a fatal crowd crush occurred at the Bandra Terminus railway station in Mumbai, India. The crush injured nine people, with two reported to be in critical condition. The incident occurred as a crowd of passengers surged towards Bandra-Gorakhpur express train, resulting in overcrowding and a crush on the platform.

== Incident ==
The incident took place early in the morning around 5:20 a.m.(IST) when a crowd at“on a platform at Bandra Terminus railway station" began rushing to board the Bandra-Gorakhpur express. The unavailability of reserved compartments of train during the festive season and the sudden arrival of the train contributed to overcrowding, causing panic among passengers and triggering the crush.

== Cause ==
Overcrowding at Bandra Terminus Railway Station is a common issue, particularly during peak festive season and travel hours. On this day, the crowd swell was reportedly exacerbated by platform congestion and insufficient access to reserved compartments due to the festive season of Diwali and Chhath leading to the dangerous surge of people on the platform.

== Response ==
=== Government and Railway authority ===
On the same day, i.e. 27 October 2024, Central Railway imposed a temporary restriction on sale of platform tickets at major stations across Maharashtra. The restrictions were imposed to manage the anticipated crowding during the upcoming Diwali and Chhath Puja festive season and to avoid such incidents happening in future. The railway stations where the restrictions were imposed included Chhatrapati Shivaji Terminus, Dadar, Kurla LTT, Thane, Kalyan, Pune and Nagpur stations with immediate effect. However, for the senior citizens and those with medical needs were exempted from these restrictions.

=== Public reaction ===
Local leaders and residents voiced criticism over the incident, pointing out longstanding issues with overcrowding and insufficient infrastructure at Mumbai's suburban stations. Politicians, including Sanjay Raut, criticised the Ministry of Railways for prioritising high-profile rail projects over essential safety measures for daily commuters.

== Aftermath ==
The Bandra Terminus crowd crush has led to calls for better crowd management protocols and infrastructural improvements to manage peak festive season surges safely.

A day later, after 10 persons were injured in the crush which occurred at the Bandra Terminus railway station in Mumbai, both the Central Railway and Western Railway made arrangements to manage the heavy festival crowd. Two individuals, who were seriously injured in the event, continue to remain in critical condition and are on oxygen support. On 28 October 2024, Western Railway set up a 370 sqm waiting area at Bandra Terminus, capable of accommodating 550 to 600 passengers, equipped with all necessary facilities. To address the rush, particularly in general and sleeper coaches heading towards the northern states, additional personnel from the Railway Protection Force (RPF) and Government Railway Police (GRP) have been deployed. Plainclothes Crime Prevention and Detection Squad teams are patrolling the stations to prevent theft and monitor suspicious activities. Vineet Abhishek, Chief Public Relations Officer of Western Railway, confirmed that 200 special trains are being operated during the Diwali and Chhath Puja festive season, with real-time monitoring of train waiting lists at divisional and headquarters levels. Additionally, In response to the crush, temporary restrictions have been imposed on the sale of platform tickets at select stations in the Mumbai Division, effective until 8 November 2024.

== See also ==
- Crowd collapses and crushes
- List of fatal crowd crushes
- Human stampede
- Mumbai Suburban Railway
- 2024 in India
