= Atul, Gujarat =

Atul
- Town
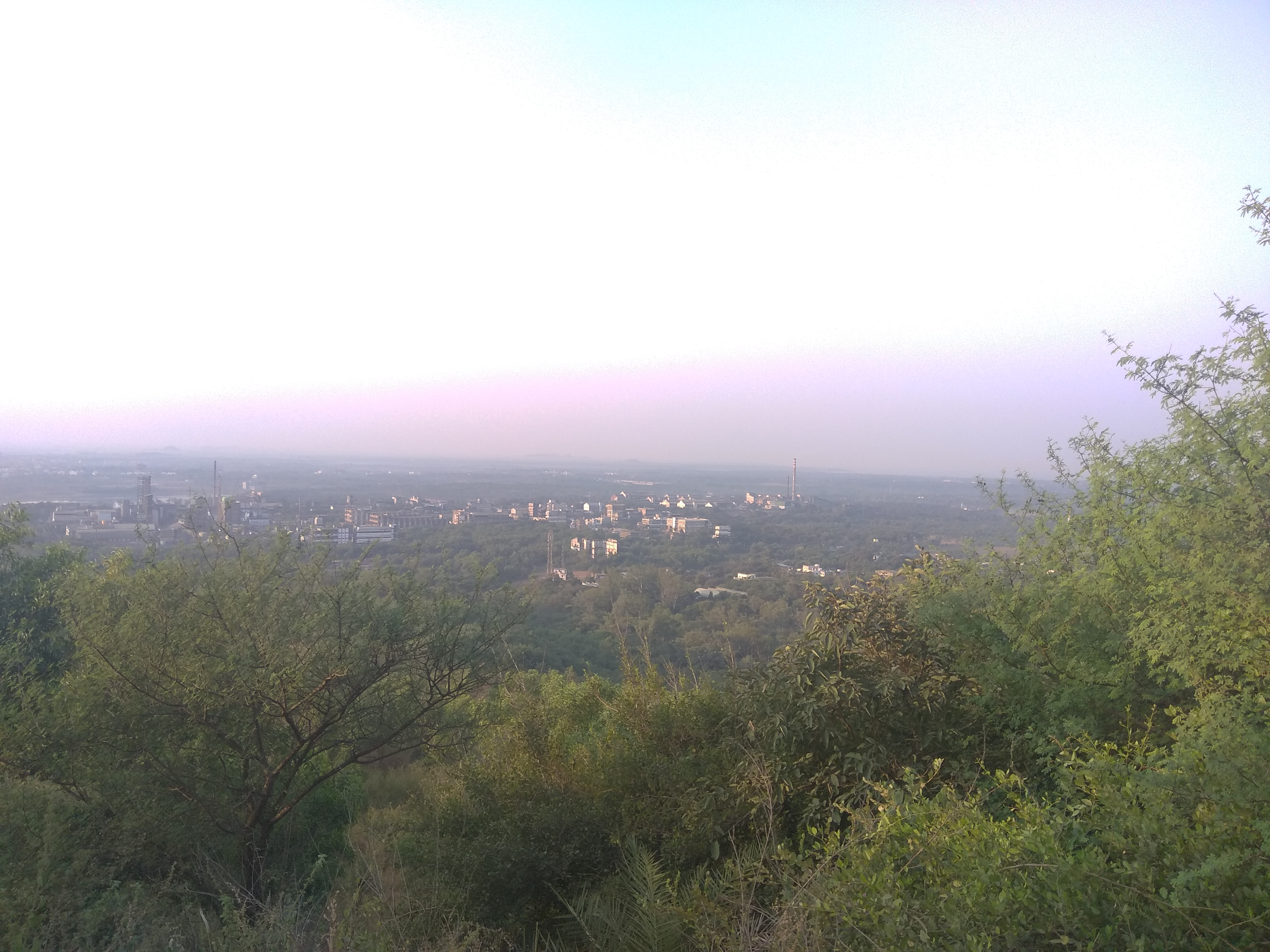
- "Atul Limited" View from Parnera Hill

- Location in Gujarat, India Atul (India) Atul (Asia)
- Coordinates: 20.52882°N 72.94116°E
- Country: India
- State: Gujarat
- District: Valsad

Population (2011)
  - Total: 3,486

Languages
  - Official: Gujarati, Hindi
- Time zone: UTC+5:30 (IST)
- PIN: 396020
- Telephone code: 02632
- Vehicle registration: GJ-15
- Nearest city: Valsad & Pardi
- Website: gujaratindia.com

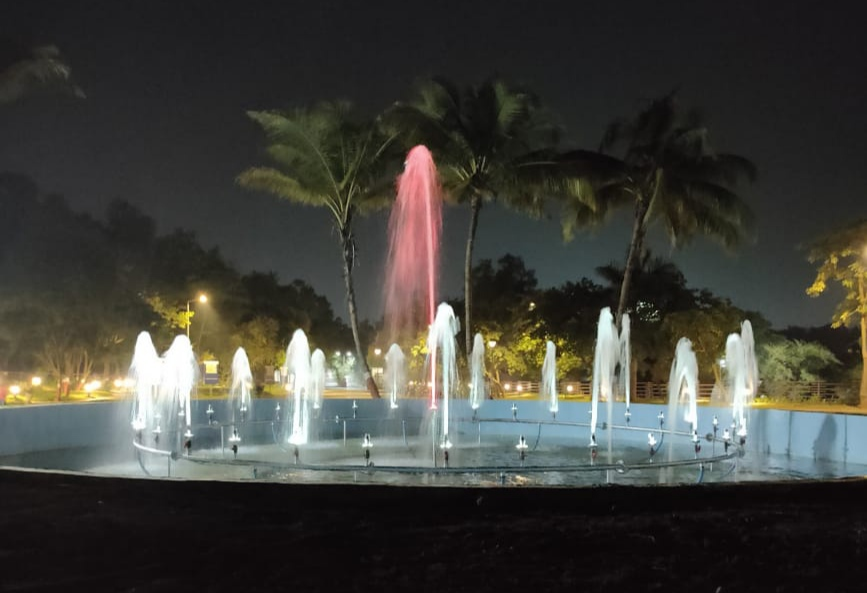
Fountain at Atul Ltd.

Atul is an industrial village developed by the chemical conglomerate Atul Ltd, located in the Valsad district of Gujarat, India. Although a small village, it has good educational, recreational facilities, banks, temples, post office, police station and a railway station.

== Demographics ==
As of Census of India, 2011, Atul has a population of 3486. Males constitute are 51.23% of the population and females are 48.77%. Atul has an average literacy rate of 83.28%; with 87.46% of males and 78.88% of females literate. 8.89% of the population is under 6 years of age. Atul, located on the bank of the Par River, derives its name from the Lalbhai Group owned Atul Ltd.

As of Census of India, 2011, Population details of ATUL(CT):

ATUL(CT) Population, 2011 (In bracket %)
Number of Households	869
Population	3,486
Male Population	1,786 (51.23%)
Female Population	1,700 (48.77%)
Children Population	310 (8.89%)
Sex-ratio	952
Literacy	2,903 (83.28%)
Male Literacy	1,562 (87.46%)
Female Literacy	1,341 (78.88%)
Scheduled Tribes (ST)	1,091 (31.30%)
Scheduled Caste (SC)	95 (2.73%)

== Transport ==
=== Railway ===
Atul is located on the Western Railway on Mumbai (Bombay)-Surat segment. Atul is 187 km from Mumbai Central. Atul is 76 km from Surat, 205 km from Vadodara (Baroda), 305 km from Ahmedabad. While coming from Mumbai, Atul is the previous station before Valsad.

=== Bus ===
Atul is connected by city bus service to Valsad. Frequency of city buses are good. Atul is located along the National Highway No 48. The nearest airports are Mumbai (around 200 km) to the south, Surat (around 80 km) & Vadodara (around 215 km) to the north.

== Educational Facilities ==
Although Atul is a small village there are very good schools available in Atul and nearby areas. The main schools are as follows.

=== Atul Vidyalaya ===
Atul Vidyalaya, founded in 1991 and sponsored by the Lalbhai Group of Companies, aims to create a centre for education, wherein each child is imparted knowledge that is contemporary and at the same time rooted firmly in our cultural heritage. It is an English medium school, up to standard 12. The school is affiliated to the Council for the Indian School Certificate Examinations (ICSE), New Delhi. Students of standard 9 and 10 appear for the ICSE (Indian Certificate of Secondary Education). Students of standard 11 and 12 appear for the ISC (Indian School Certificate).

=== Kalyani School ===
Kalyani School is a Gujarati medium, co-educational school up to standard 12, following GSHSE Board curriculum. It was founded in 1953. It is managed by Atul Kelavni Mandal. It is the first school in the town and one of the great schools. On 15 August 1948 (on 1st anniversary of Indian Independence) Pandit. Jawaharlal Nehru (first Prime Minister of India) had given a speech from the podium of Kalyani School, Atul.

=== Vallabh Ashram School ===
One more school is located 2.5 km away from Atul. It is an English medium school, up to standard 12. It follows the CBSE curriculum. It has hostel facilities for boys as well as girls. Its full name is 'M.G. M. Amin and V. N. Savani School'. Mr. RP Maurya is the incumbent principal of this 4 decade old school.

== Atul Ltd ==
The village Atul was developed due to the company Atul Ltd. which was established in year 1947 here. Spread over 1,300 acres, the manufacturing facility is an example of transformation of completely barren lands into one of the greenest chemical complexes in the world.

Atul Ltd has very well developed colonies for residence of its employees in Atul Village. The colonies are named as Down Colony, Up Colony, Suruchi Colony, Suvidha Colony, G-J-K Colony, Cyanamid Colony etc. Three Guest Houses belonging to the Company are also located in the residential area.

== Temples & Mosque ==
- Atuleshwar Mahadev Temple
- Umakant Mahadev Temple, Bhola Nagar
- Jain Temple, Suruchi Colony
- Atul Dargah, Down Colony
- Maa Vishwambhari Temple, Rabada

== Other Facilities ==
=== Banks ===
- State Bank of India
- UCO Bank
- Axis Bank
- SBPP Co-operative Bank Ltd., Bhola Nagar

=== Post Office ===
Atul Post Office is located in Atul village of Valsad district of Gujarat state. It is a sub post office. Pin code of Atul Post Office is 396020. This post office falls under Valsad postal division of the Gujarat postal circle. Atul post office offers all the postal services like delivery of mails & parcels, money transfer, banking, insurance and retail services. It also provides other services including passport applications, P.O. Box distribution, and other delivery services in Atul.

=== Police Station ===
Atul Police Station is a small police station located near Atul post office, Atul.

=== Atul Club ===
Atul Club offers several sport facilities such as badminton, billiards, swimming, table tennis and also has a gymnasium for fitness enthusiasts.

=== Ulhas Cricket Ground ===
Ulhas Cricket Ground is biggest cricket ground of Atul village. Utkarsh, Ulhas organization organises cricket tournament, culture programs, food festival, annual fun fair at Ulhas Cricket Ground for joy and encouraging local people in sports. Atul Premier League(APL) was also organized at this place by Atul Yuva Group and Atul Co. Op. Housing Society.

=== Open Air Theatre ===
Open Air Theatre is located near Atul Vidyalaya of Atul village. The capacity of Open Air Theatre is around 2500-3000 people. Open Air Theatre is an important place for Annual functions, Atul Day, Movie Screening and Cultural programs.

== Awards ==
In 2024, Atul village was awarded "Platinum Green Village Certificate" by Indian Green Building Council (IGBC). Atul village of Valsad taluka had become Gujarat's first Green Platinum Village. Among the 6 villages announced in India, Atul village of Valsad was included. Atul Gram Panchayat Village Head "Shri Vikram Nayaka" and Village Sub-Head "Shri Darshal Desai" were awarded this certificate by Ahmedabad Municipal Commissioner "Shri M. Thennarasan" in a program held at Ahmedabad.
