= Virar–Surat Passenger =

Indian train route

Virar - Surat Passenger
Overview
- Service type: Passenger
- Current operator: Western Railway zone

Route
- Termini: Virar (VR); Surat (ST)
- Stops: 28
- Distance travelled: 208 km (129 mi)
- Average journey time: 6 hrs 20 mins
- Service frequency: Daily
- Train number: 59037/59038

On-board services
- Class: Unreserved
- Seating arrangements: Yes
- Sleeping arrangements: No
- Catering facilities: No
- Entertainment facilities: No

Technical
- Rolling stock: 2
- Track gauge: 1,676 mm (5 ft 6 in)
- Operating speed: 34 km/h (21 mph)

The 59037/59038 Virar - Surat Passenger is a passenger train of the Indian Railways connecting Virar in Maharashtra and Surat of Gujarat. It is currently being operated with 59037/59038 train numbers on a daily basis.

== Service ==
The 59037/Virar - Surat Passenger has average speed of 31 km/h and covers 208 km in 6 hrs 45 mins.

The 59038/Surat - Virar Passenger has average speed of 36 km/h and covers 208 km in 5 hrs 50 mins.

== Route ==
The 59037/38 Virar - Surat Passenger runs from Virar via Palghar, Dahanu Road, Vapi, Valsad and Udhna Junction to Surat and vice versa.

== Coach composite ==
The train consists of 18 coaches:

- 15 General Unreserved(GEN)
- 2 Seating cum Luggage Rake(SLR)
- 1 First-class Coach(FC)

== Traction ==
Both trains are hauled by a Locomotive shed, Vadodara based WAG-5P or Locomotive shed, Valsad based WAG-5.

== Rake sharing ==
The train shares its rake with 59039 Virar - Valsad Shuttle, 59040 Vapi - Virar Shuttle, 59045 Bandra Terminus - Vapi Passenger, 59046 Valsad - Bandra Terminus Passenger.
