= Date palm farming in Gujarat =

Date palm in India occurs in the western border, especially in the Kutchh district of Gujarat with about 18286 ha. with a production of 171522 MT of fresh fruits. It was at initial stage in 2014. Among Rajasthan, Maharashtra, Tamil Nadu, and Kerala and other states Gujarat is the top producer. Gujarat state gives subsidy to its producers.

== See also ==
- Date palm farming in Rajasthan
- Agriculture in India
