= Atul (company) =

Indian chemical company

Atul Limited
- Type: Public
- Traded as: BSE: 500027; NSE: ATUL
- ISIN: ISIN: INE100A01010
- Industry: Chemical industry
- Founded: 5 September 1947
- Founder: Kasturbhai Lalbhai (Founder)
- Headquarters: Atul, Valsad district, Gujarat, India
- Area served: Worldwide
- Key people: Sunil Siddharth Lalbhai (Chairman and MD), Gopi Kannan Thirukonda (CFO)
- Revenue: ₹5,583 crore (US$580 million)
- Operating income: ₹692 crore (US$72 million)
- Net income: ₹499 crore (US$52 million)
- Total assets: ₹7,001 crore (US$730 million)
- Total equity: ₹5,662 crore (US$590 million)
- Number of employees: 3,359 (2025)
- Parent: Lalbhai Group
- Website: www.atul.co.in

Atul Limited is an Indian chemical manufacturing company headquartered in Atul, Gujarat and is listed on both stock exchanges of India. Founded on 5 September 1947 by industrialist Kasturbhai Lalbhai, it was one of the first private‐sector enterprises established in post‐independence India and is part of the Lalbhai Group. It serves over 4,000 customers across more than 30 industries in 90 countries through wholly owned subsidiaries in the United States, United Kingdom, United Arab Emirates, China, and Brazil.

Atul has diversified itself into a chemical conglomerate from a small company making a few textile dyes into a chemical conglomerate manufacturing 900 products and 400 formulations to 4,000 customers belonging to 30 diverse industries in the process making India self-reliant in manufacturing of several chemicals. The company has established 41 operating subsidiary, a joint venture and associate entities over the seven decades.

Atul is the largest producer of para Cresol, para-anisic, aldehyde and para-anisic alcohol in the world with almost 55% of total global capacity at a single location.

Atul also manufactures many pharmaceuticals and drugs and it is the first company in India to manufacture Dapsone.

In 2024 Atul village developed by Atul and with help of its Atul Foundation got the Platinum Green Village certification.

== History ==
Atul was incorporated on 5 September 1947 by Kasturbhai Lalbhai. The manufacturing plant at Atul village inaugurated by Prime Minister Jawaharlal Nehru in 1952. Early international partnerships included American Cyanamid (1952) to form Cyanamid India Ltd for industrial chemicals and Imperial Chemical Industries (ICI) in 1955 to create Atic Industries Ltd for textile dyes. In 1960, a joint venture with Ciba-Geigy resulted in the creation of Cibatul Ltd for manufacturing epoxy resins.

== See also ==
- Chemical industry in India
- Pharmaceutical industry in India
- Kasturbhai Lalbhai
