= Udvada railway station =

Railway station in Gujarat, India

General information
- Location: Udvada, Gujarat; India
- Coordinates: 20°27′44″N 72°55′09″E
- Elevation: 20 metres (66 ft)
- System: Indian Railways station
- Owner: Ministry of Railways, Indian Railways
- Operator: Western Railway
- Lines: New Delhi–Mumbai main line Ahmedabad–Mumbai main line
- Platforms: 3
- Tracks: 3

Construction
- Structure type: Standard (on ground)
- Parking: No

Other information
- Status: Functioning
- Station code: UVD
- Zone(s): Western Railway
- Division(s): Mumbai WR

Services
Preceding station	Indian Railways	Following station
Pardi towards ?	New Delhi–Mumbai main line	Bagwada towards ?
Location
- Location within India Location within Gujarat

Udvada railway station is a railway station on the Western Railway in the state of Gujarat, India. Udvada railway station is 17 km far away from Valsad railway station. Passenger, MEMU and few Express trains halt at Udvada railway station.

In 2019, a new heritage look will be given to 123 years old Udvada railway station. Structure of new building will resemble Parsi religion's carved house type structure.

== See also ==
- Valsad district
