= Pardi railway station =

Railway station in Gujarat, India

General information
- Location: Pardi, Gujarat; India
- Coordinates: 20°30′50″N 72°55′28″E
- Elevation: 17 metres (56 ft)
- System: Indian Railways station
- Owner: Ministry of Railways, Indian Railways
- Operator: Western Railway
- Lines: New Delhi–Mumbai main line Ahmedabad–Mumbai main line
- Platforms: 3
- Tracks: 3

Construction
- Structure type: Standard (on ground)
- Parking: No

Other information
- Status: Functioning
- Station code: PAD
- Zone(s): Western Railway
- Division(s): Mumbai WR

Services
Preceding station	Indian Railways	Following station
Atul towards ?	New Delhi–Mumbai main line	Udvada towards ?
Location
- Location within India Location within Gujarat

Pardi railway station is a small railway station on the Western Railway network in the state of Gujarat, India. Pardi railway station is 11 km away from Valsad railway station. Passenger, MEMU and few Express trains halt at Pardi railway station.

== Major trains ==
Following Express trains halt at Pardi railway station in both directions:

- 19023/24 Mumbai Central–Firozpur Janata Express
- 19215/16 Mumbai Central–Porbandar Saurashtra Express

== See also ==
- Valsad district
