= Pardi =

Pardi Killa Pardi
- town
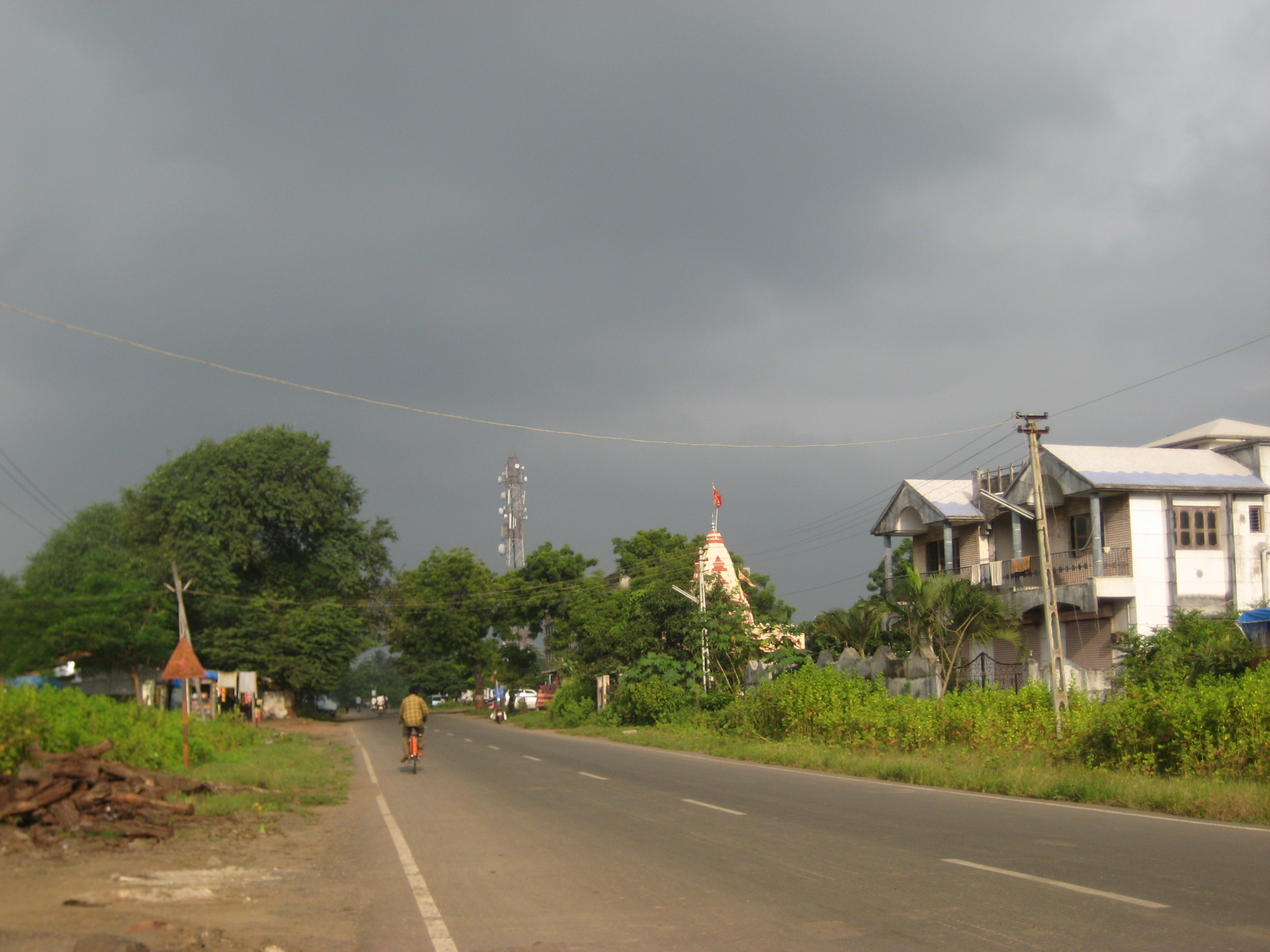
- Chival Road, Pardi, Valsad

- Location in Gujarat, India
- Coordinates: 20.52°N 72.95°E
- Country: India
- State: Gujarat
- District: Valsad

Government
  - President, Pardi Municipality
- Elevation: 18 m (59 ft)

Population (2011)
  - Total: 28,495

Languages
  - Official: Gujarati, Hindi
- Time zone: UTC+5:30 (IST)
- Postal code: 396125

Pardi is a town and municipality in the Valsad district of the Indian state of Gujarat. Roughly 14 km south of the district headquarters city of Valsad, Pardi has a rail station on the Mumbai-Vadodara line of the Western Railway zone. National Highway 48 bisects the town.

== Geography ==
Pardi is located at 20.52°N 72.95°E. It has an average elevation of 18 metres (59 feet).

== Demographics ==
In the 2011 Indian census, Pardi Municipality had a population of 28,495, 14,648 males and 13,847 females.

There were 2704 children in Pardi Municipality aged 0-6, 9.49% of the total population. The female to male Sex ratio was 945; the Gujarat state average was 919. The child Sex Ratio in Pardi is around 891; the state average is 890. The literacy rate of Pardi city was 87.10%; the state average was 78.03%. The male literacy rate was 90.91% and the female rate was 83.09%.
