= Bandra Terminus =

Railway terminus in Mumbai, India

Bandra Terminus Vandre Terminus
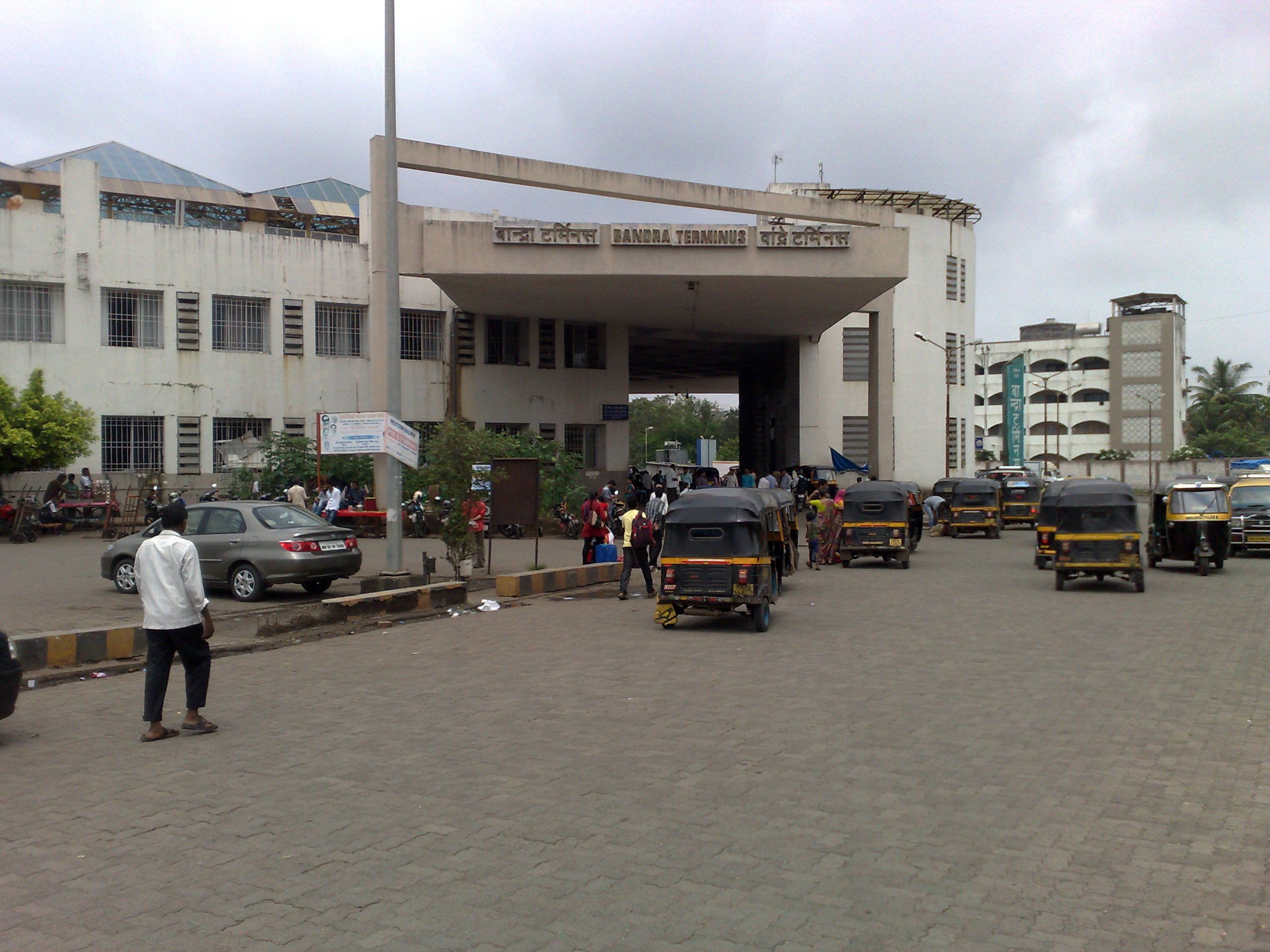

General information
- Location: Bandra (East), Mumbai, Maharashtra; India
- Coordinates: 19°3′45.52″N 72°50′27.92″E
- Elevation: 4.00 metres (13.12 ft)
- System: Indian Railways terminus
- Owner: Indian Railways
- Operator: Western Railways
- Platforms: 7
- Tracks: 7
- Connections: BEST, auto rickshaw stand, prepaid taxi stand

Construction
- Parking: Yes

Other information
- Status: Functioning
- Station code: BDTS
- Zone(s): Western Railway zone
- Division(s): Mumbai WR

History
- Opened: 1992; 34 years ago
Location
- Location within Maharashtra Location within India

Bandra Terminus (station code: BDTS), also known as Vandre Terminus (in Marathi), is a railway terminus in Bandra, Maharashtra from where trains bound for northern India and western India are scheduled regularly. It was built in the 1990s to address congestion at the main Mumbai Central station. It is one of the five railway terminus within Greater Mumbai, along with Chhatrapati Shivaji Terminus, Mumbai Central, Lokmanya Tilak Terminus and Dadar. It is close to Bandra Kurla Complex, a commercially important part of Mumbai, as well as Mumbai Airport.

== Diesel Loco Shed, Bandra ==
Serial no.	Locomotive class	Horsepower	Quantity
1.	WDS-6/6 AD	1400	25
Total locomotives active as of May 2025			25

== Major trains ==
The trains which originate from Bandra Terminus are:

- 12903 Bandra Terminus - Amritsar Golden Temple Mail
- 22543/22544 Bandra Terminus–Lal Kuan Weekly Superfast Express
- 19019/20 Bandra Terminus–Dehradun Express
- 19003/04 Bandra Terminus–Bhusawal Khandesh Express
- 10115-10116 Bandra Terminus - Madgaon Express
- 15067/68 Bandra Terminus–Gorakhpur Express (via Barhni)
- 19091/92 Bandra Terminus-Gorakhpur Humsafar Express
- 22196/95 Bandra Terminus–Jhansi Bi Weekly Express
- 22443/44 Bandra Terminus–Kanpur Central Weekly Superfast Express
- 22921/22 Bandra Terminus–Gorakhpur Antyodaya Express
- 12935/36 Bandra Terminus–Surat Intercity Express
- 12471/72 Bandra Terminus–Shri Mata Vaishno Devi Katra Swaraj Superfast Express
- 12925/26 Bandra Terminus–Amritsar Paschim Superfast Express
- 22451/52 Bandra Terminus–Chandigarh Bi-Weekly Superfast Express
- 19027/28 Bandra Terminus–Jammu Tawi Vivek Express
- 12215/16 Bandra Terminus–Delhi Sarai Rohilla Garib Rath Express
- 20921/22 Bandra Terminus–Lucknow Weekly SF Express
- 22913/14 Bandra Terminus–Saharsa Humsafar Express
- 22917/18 Bandra Terminus–Haridwar Weekly SF Express
- 12480/79 Bandra Terminus–Jodhpur Suryanagari Superfast Express
- 12979/80 Bandra Terminus–Jaipur Tri-Weekly Superfast Express
- 12909/10 Bandra Terminus–Hazrat Nizamuddin Garib Rath Express
- 12907/08 Bandra Terminus–Hazrat Nizamuddin Maharashtra Sampark Kranti Express
- 12247/48 Bandra Terminus–Hazrat Nizamuddin Yuva Express
- 22927/28 Bandra Terminus–Ahmedabad Lok Shakti Superfast Express
- 19707/08 Bandra Terminus–Shriganganagar Amrapur Aravali Express
- 12971/72 Bandra Terminus–Bhavnagar Terminus Express
- 20941/42 Bandra Terminus–Bhagat Ki Kothi Humsafar Express
- 20941/42 Bandra Terminus–Ghazipur City Weekly Express
- 22965/66 Bandra Terminus–Bhagat Ki Kothi Express
- 22923/24 Bandra Terminus–Jamnagar Humsafar Express
- 22931/32 Bandra Terminus–Jaisalmer Superfast Express
- 12997/98 Bandra Terminus - Barmer Humsafar Express
- 21901/02 Bandra Terminus - Barmer Humsafar Express
- 21903/04 Bandra Terminus - Bikaner AC Superfast Express

== See also ==
- 2024 Mumbai stampede
