= Navsari railway station =

Railway station in Gujarat, India

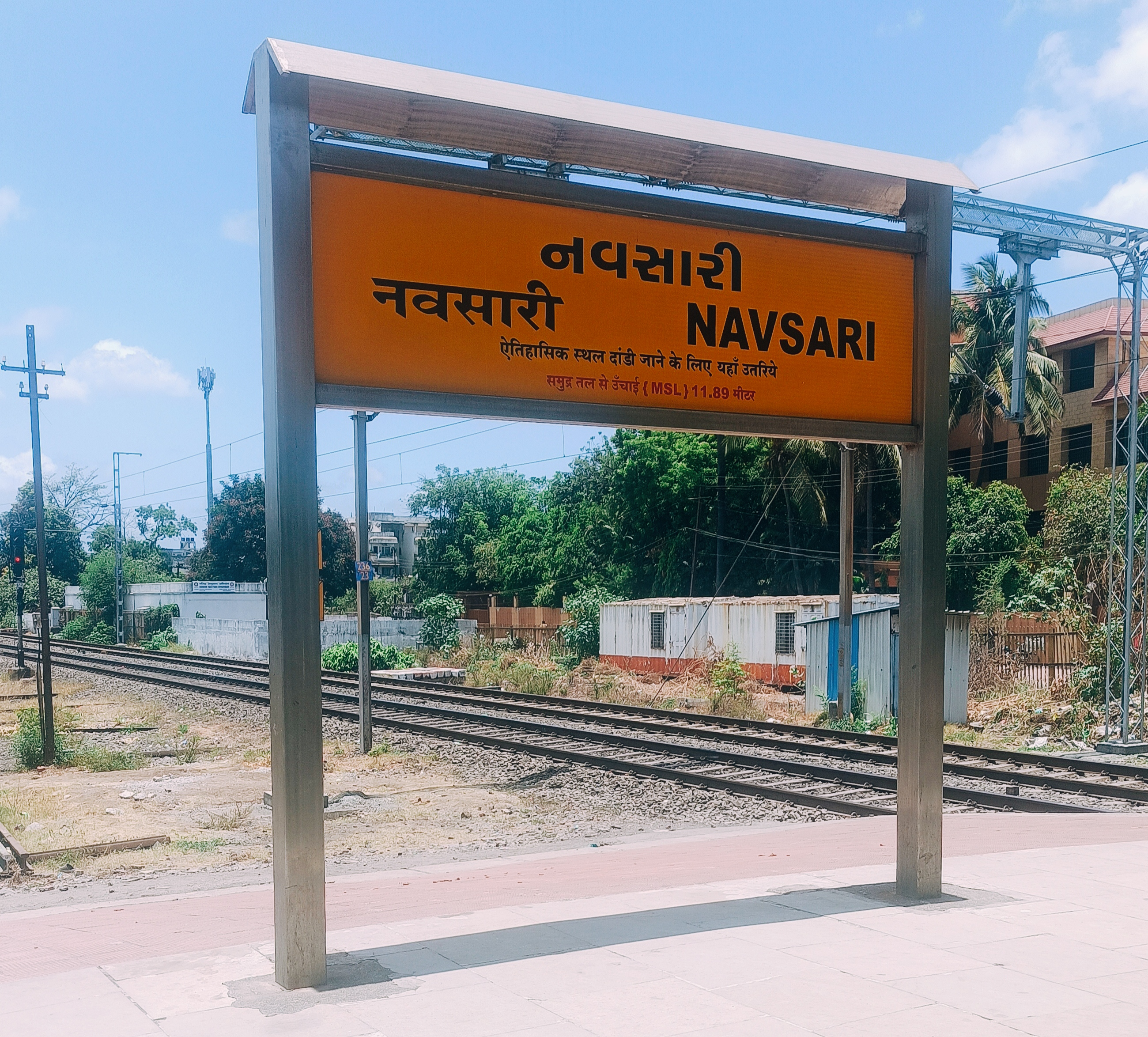
- Navsari railway station platform board

General information
- Location: Navsari, Gujarat; India
- Coordinates: 20°56′54″N 72°54′48″E
- Elevation: 14 metres (46 ft)
- System: Indian Railways station
- Owner: Ministry of Railways, Indian Railways
- Operator: Western Railway
- Lines: New Delhi–Mumbai main line Ahmedabad–Mumbai main line
- Platforms: 3
- Tracks: 3

Construction
- Structure type: Standard (on-ground station)
- Parking: Available

Other information
- Status: Functioning
- Station code: NVS
- Zone(s): Western Railway
- Division(s): Mumbai WR

History
- Opened: 1866

Services
Preceding station	Indian Railways	Following station
Maroli towards ?	New Delhi–Mumbai main line	Gandhi Smriti towards ?
Location
- Location within India Location within Gujarat

Navsari railway station is a railway station serving Navsari city, in Navsari district of Gujarat State of India. It is "A" category railway station of Mumbai WR railway division of Western Railway zone. It is under Mumbai WR railway division of Western Railway zone of Indian Railways. It is located on New Delhi–Mumbai main line of the Indian Railways.

It is located at 14 m above sea level and has three platforms. As of 2016, the railway line is electrified double broad-gauge railway line. At this station, 90 Passenger, MEMU, Express, and Superfast trains halt here each day. Surat Airport, is at distance of 28 kilometers.

== Gallery ==
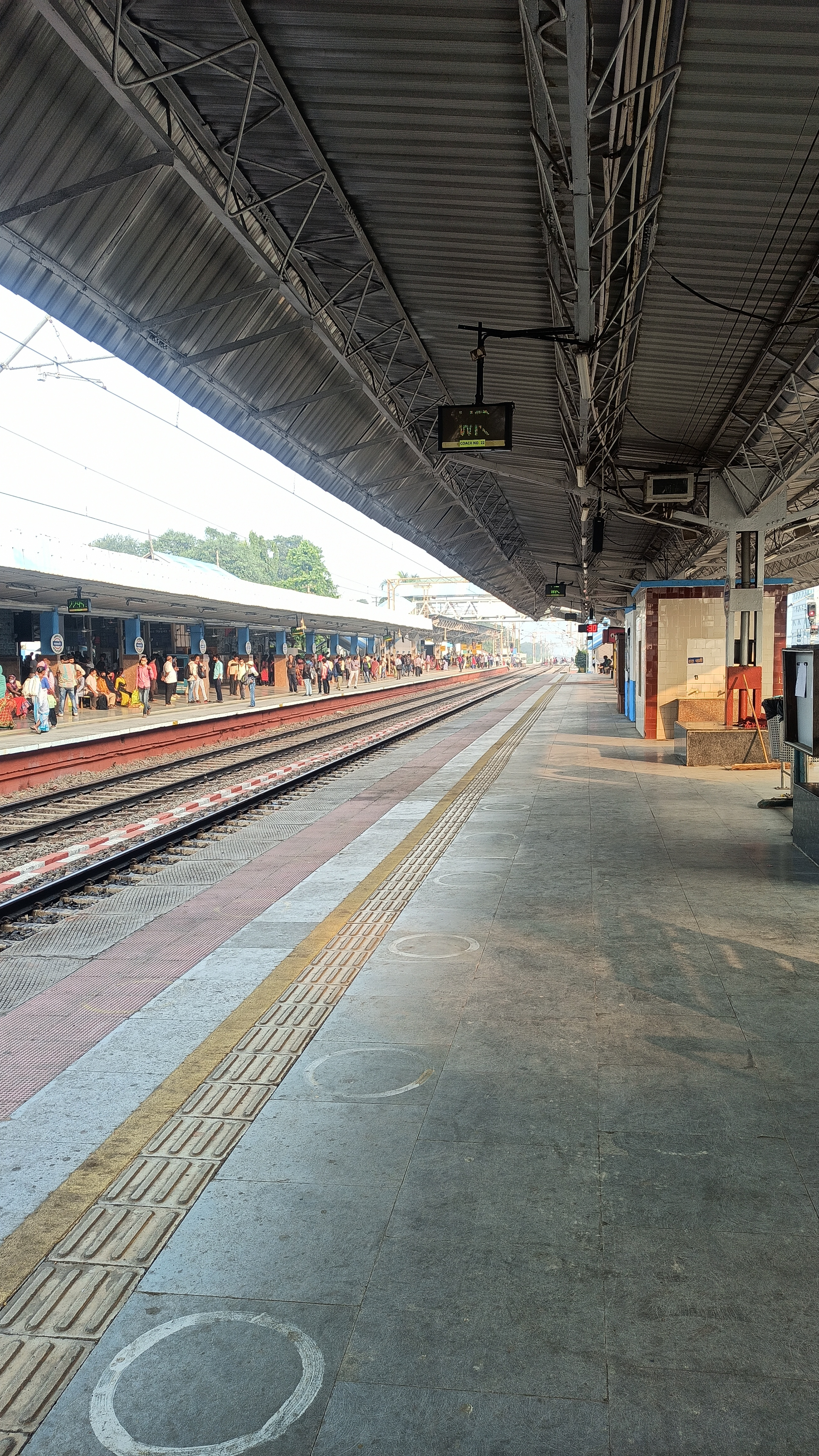
Coach Indicator at NVS

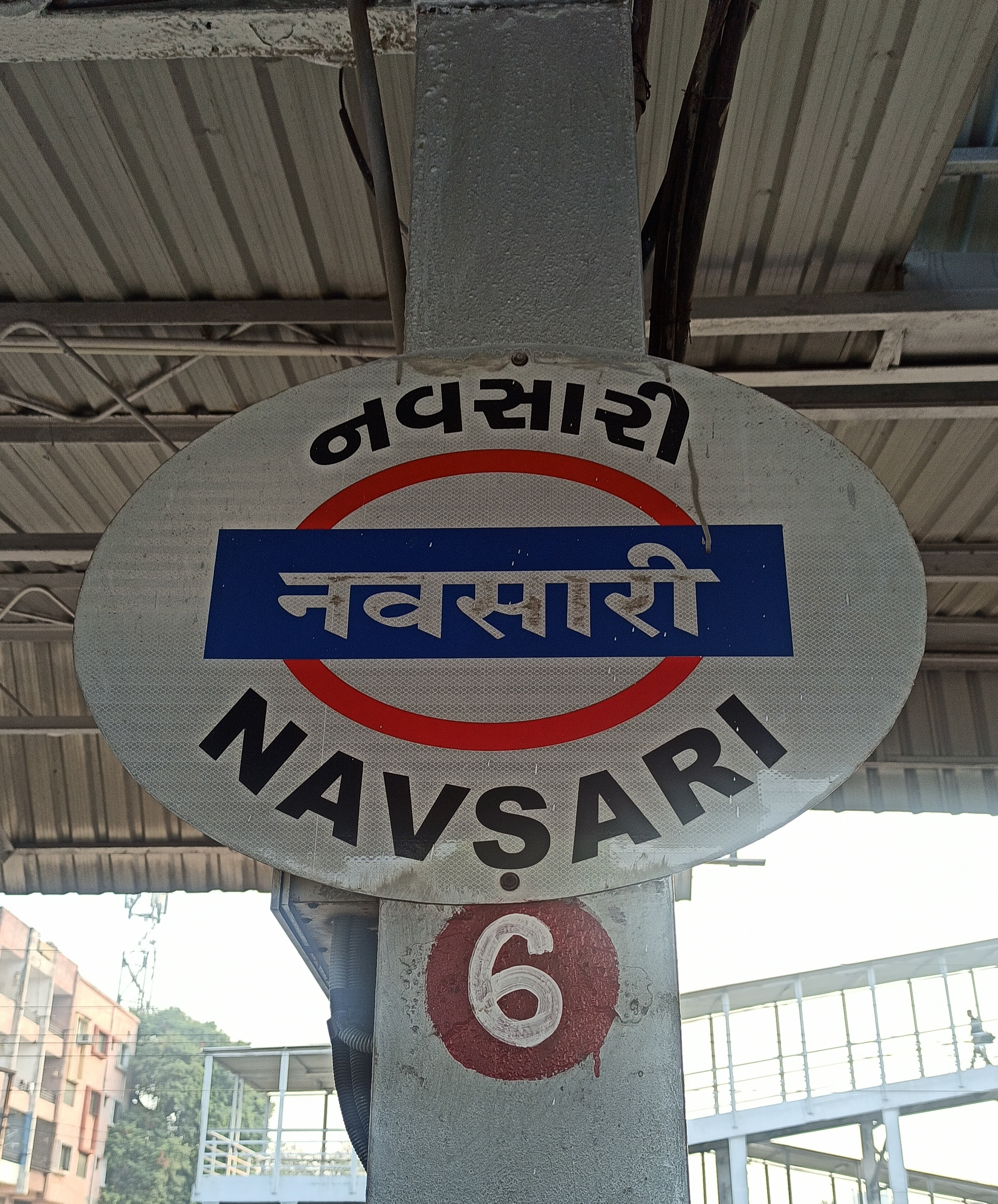
Navsari railway station platform board
