= Virar railway station =

Railway station in Maharashtra, India

Virar

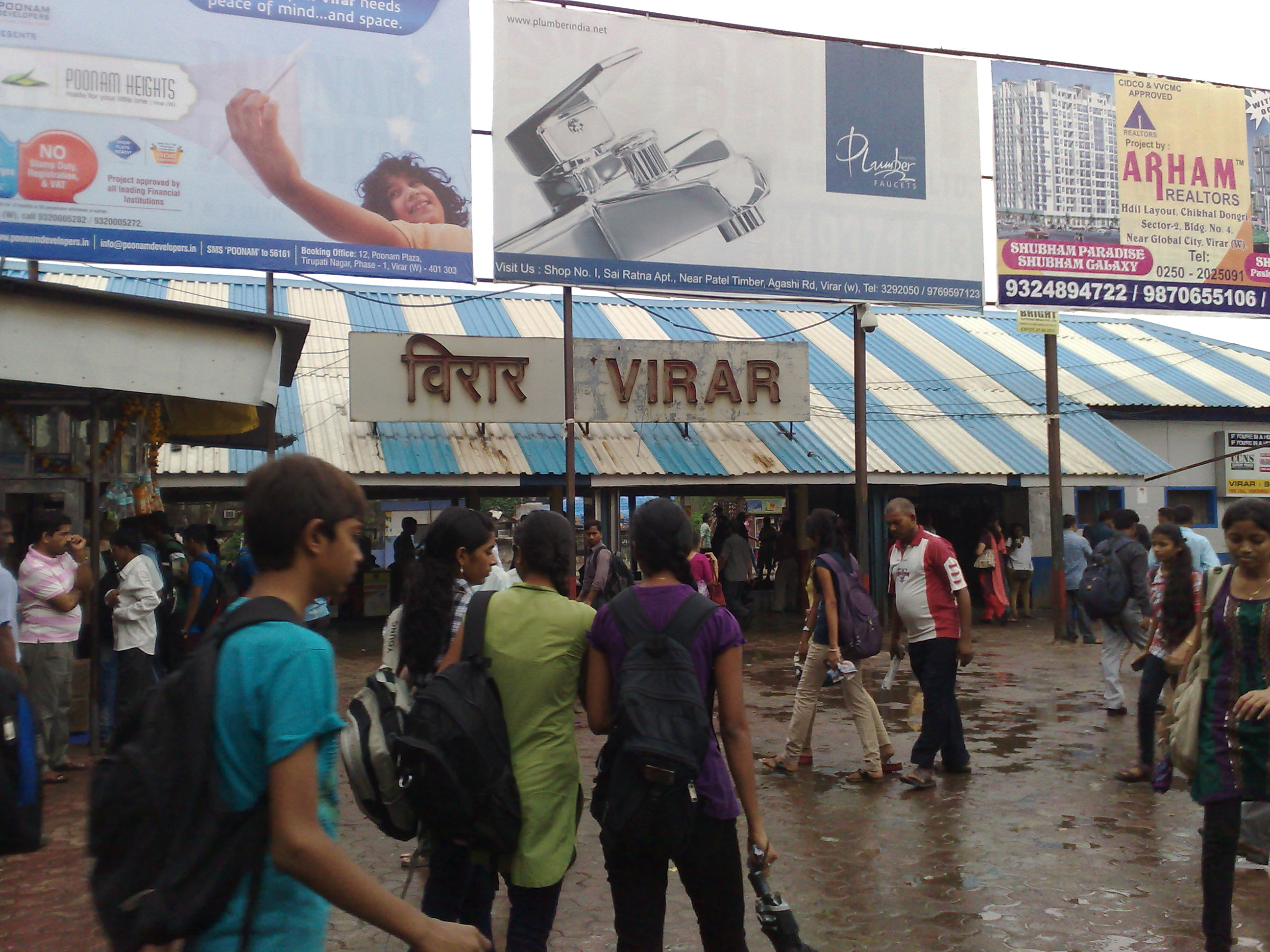

General information
- Location: Virar
- Coordinates: 19.4553°N 72.8120°E
- System: Mumbai Suburban Railway station
- Owner: Ministry of Railways, Indian Railways
- Line: Western Line
- Platforms: 8
- Tracks: 9

Construction
- Structure type: Standard on-ground station

Other information
- Status: Active
- Station code: V (suburban); VR (mainline)
- Fare zone: Western Railway zone

Passengers
- 2012-13: 3,95,095

Services
Preceding station	Mumbai Suburban Railway	Following station
Nallasopara towards Churchgate	Western line	Vaitarna towards Dahanu Road
Route map
Location
- Location within India Location within Maharashtra

Virar (Marathi pronunciation: [ʋiɾaːɾ]; station code: VR) is a railway station on the Western line of the Mumbai Suburban Railway network.

== History ==
Virar was the northernmost station on the first regular suburban train service of the erstwhile BB&CI railway (today's Western Railway), that commenced on 12 April 1867 (from Bombay Backbay to Viraur). Then, it was spelt as 'Viraur'. Hence, it might be concluded that the station itself was constructed sometime in the mid-1860s.

The station was remodeled, along with Borivali, after or in 1913, similarly to how Borivali was the same year. The old layout of the station was again quite similar to that of Borivali's, having two platforms, Down and Island. The Down platform was located in the West, catering to trains toward Saphale, while the Island platform was located in East, catering the up line trains toward Nallasopara, and another branching platform line. The station then had two cabins (A and B), both located South and North of the Down platform, respectively.

In 2016, a fire damaged the Station, and "services were affected." After the 2017 remodeling, the platforms were renumbered, leading to some commuters' confusion.

In the 2020s, the Station has been extensively reported to be the scene of "chaotic" protests and violent crime. However, such incidents frequently happen across all stations in the Mumbai Suburban Railway network but most incidents are either less reported or not reported at all.

== Gallery ==
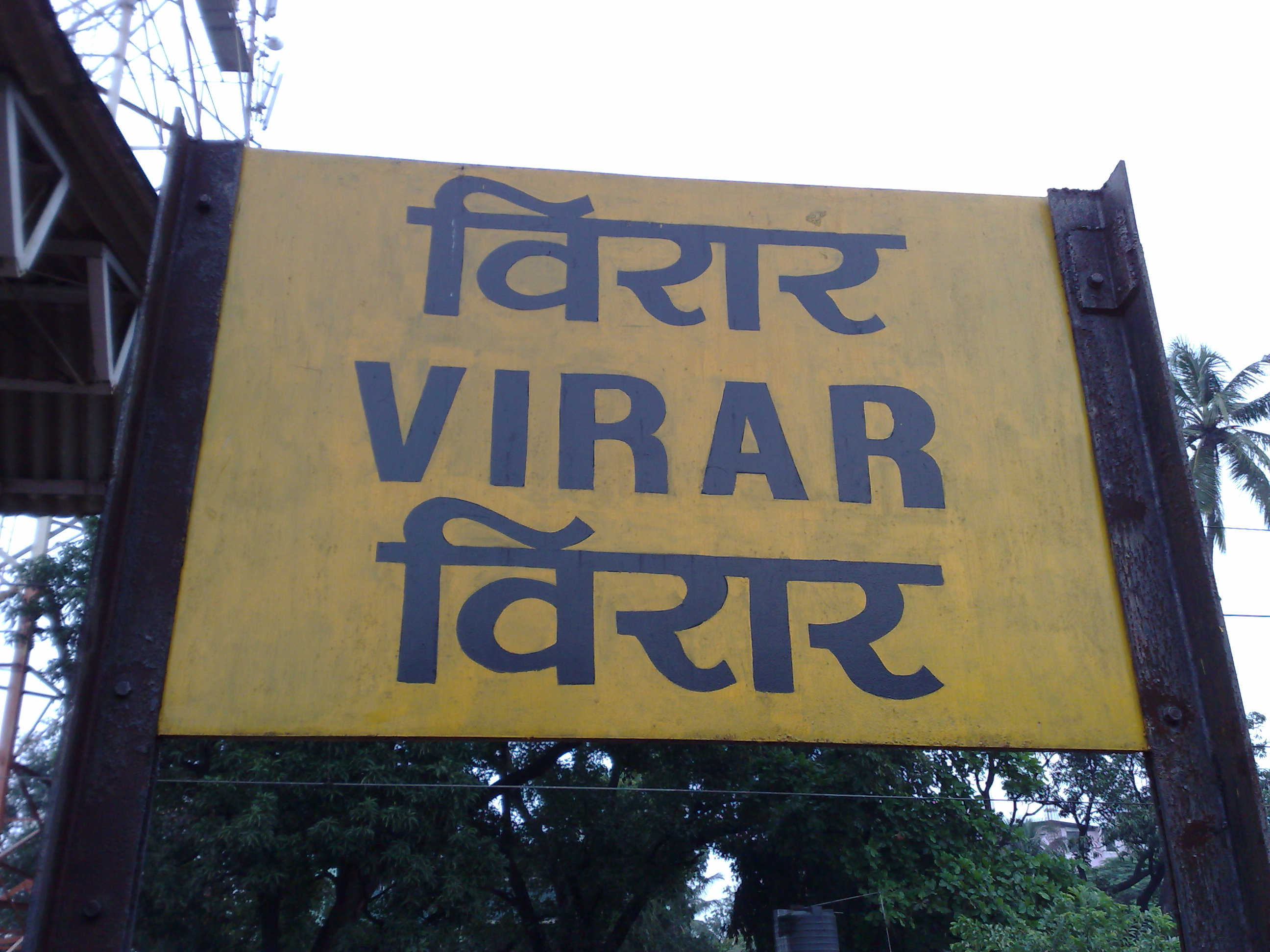
Virar railway station – Stationboard

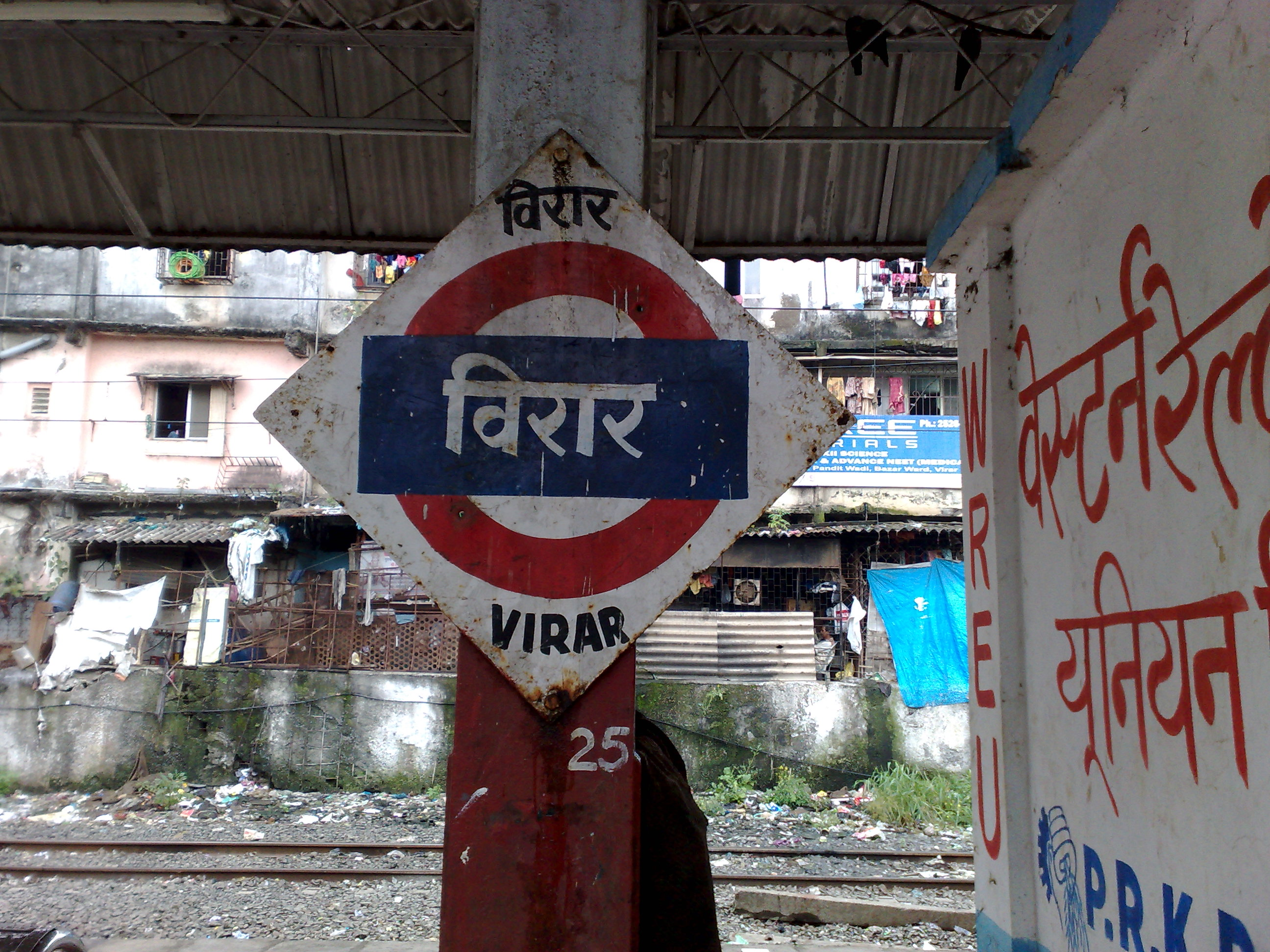
Virar railway station – Platformboard

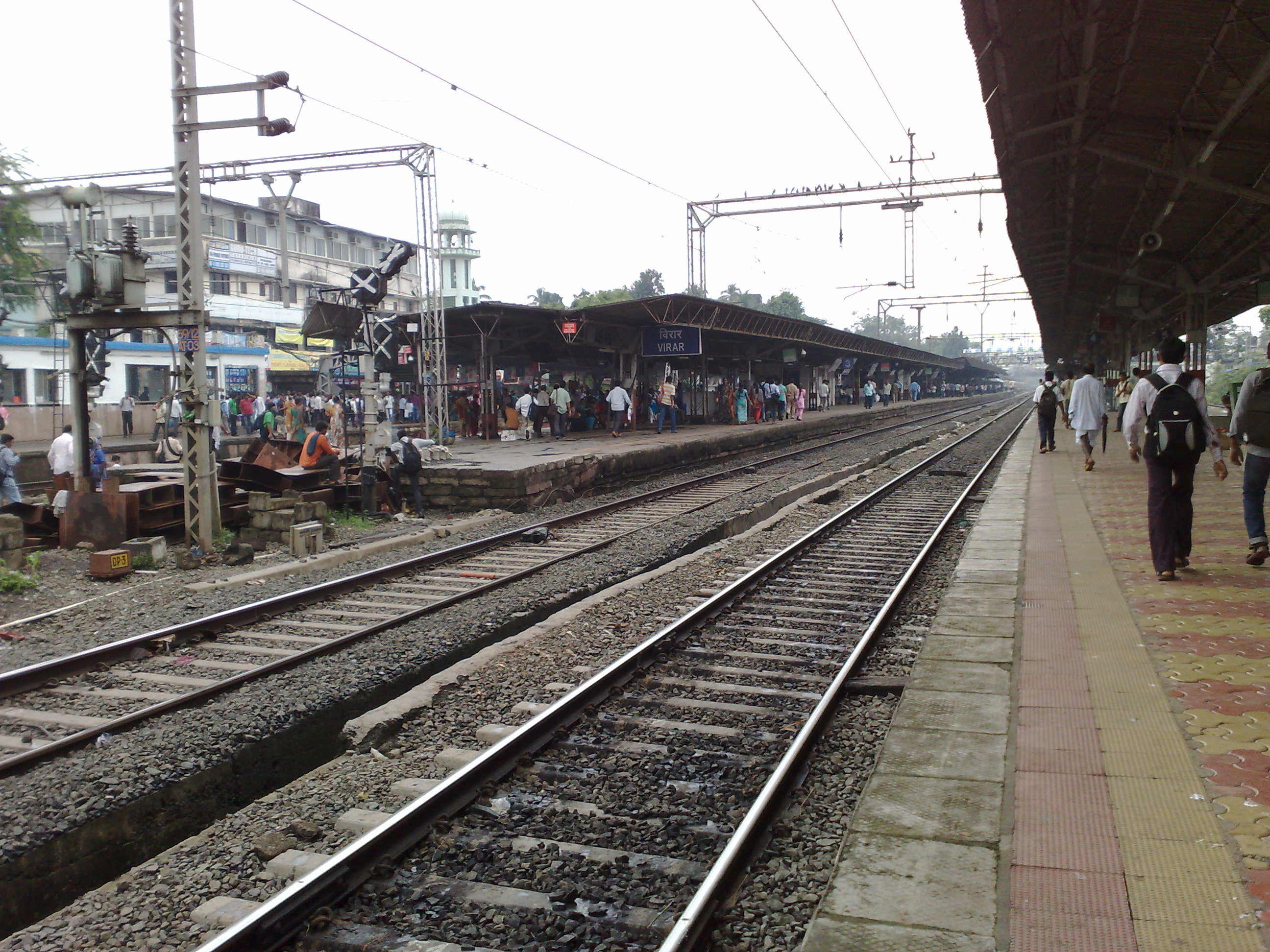
Virar railway station – Overview

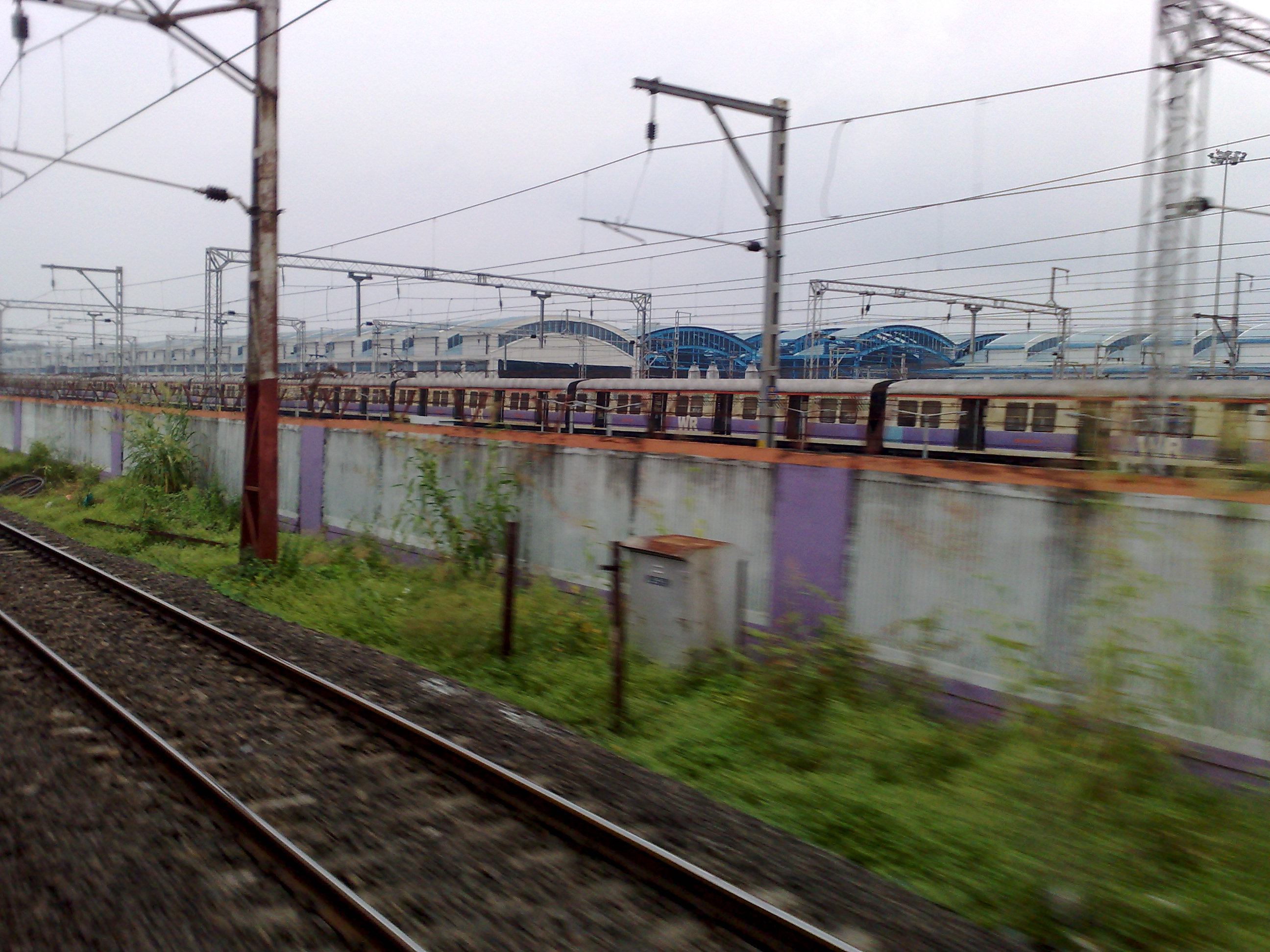
Outside Virar coaching depot
