= Vapi railway station =

Railway station in Gujarat

Vapi
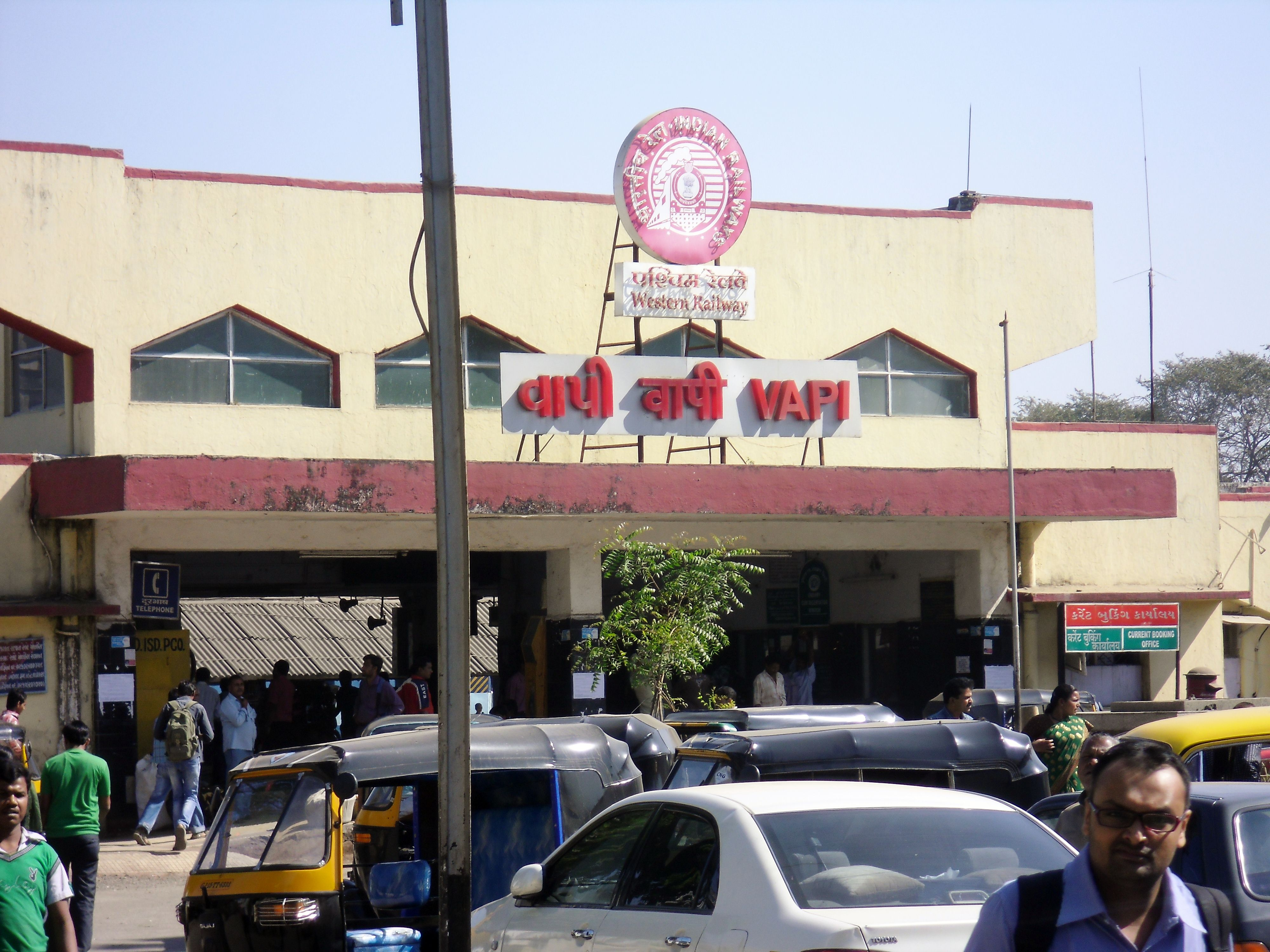

General information
- Location: Vapi, Gujarat; India
- Coordinates: 20°22′24″N 72°54′31″E
- Elevation: 27 metres (89 ft)
- System: Indian Railways station
- Owner: Indian Railways
- Operator: Western Railway
- Lines: New Delhi–Mumbai main line Ahmedabad–Mumbai main line
- Platforms: 3
- Tracks: 7

Construction
- Structure type: Standard (on ground)
- Parking: Available
- Accessible: Available

Other information
- Status: Functioning
- Station code: VAPI
- Zone(s): Western Railway
- Division(s): Mumbai WR

Services
Preceding station	Indian Railways	Following station
Surat towards ?	New Delhi–Mumbai main line	Mumbai Central towards ?
Location
- Location within Gujarat
- Interactive map

Vapi railway station (station code:- VAPI) is a railway station on the Western Railway network in the state of Gujarat. It is located in Vapi city. It is a major railway station in South Gujarat after Surat.

Vapi is "A" category railway station of Mumbai WR railway division of Western Railway Zone. It is well connected by rail to all major cities of India. Some passenger trains start from here.

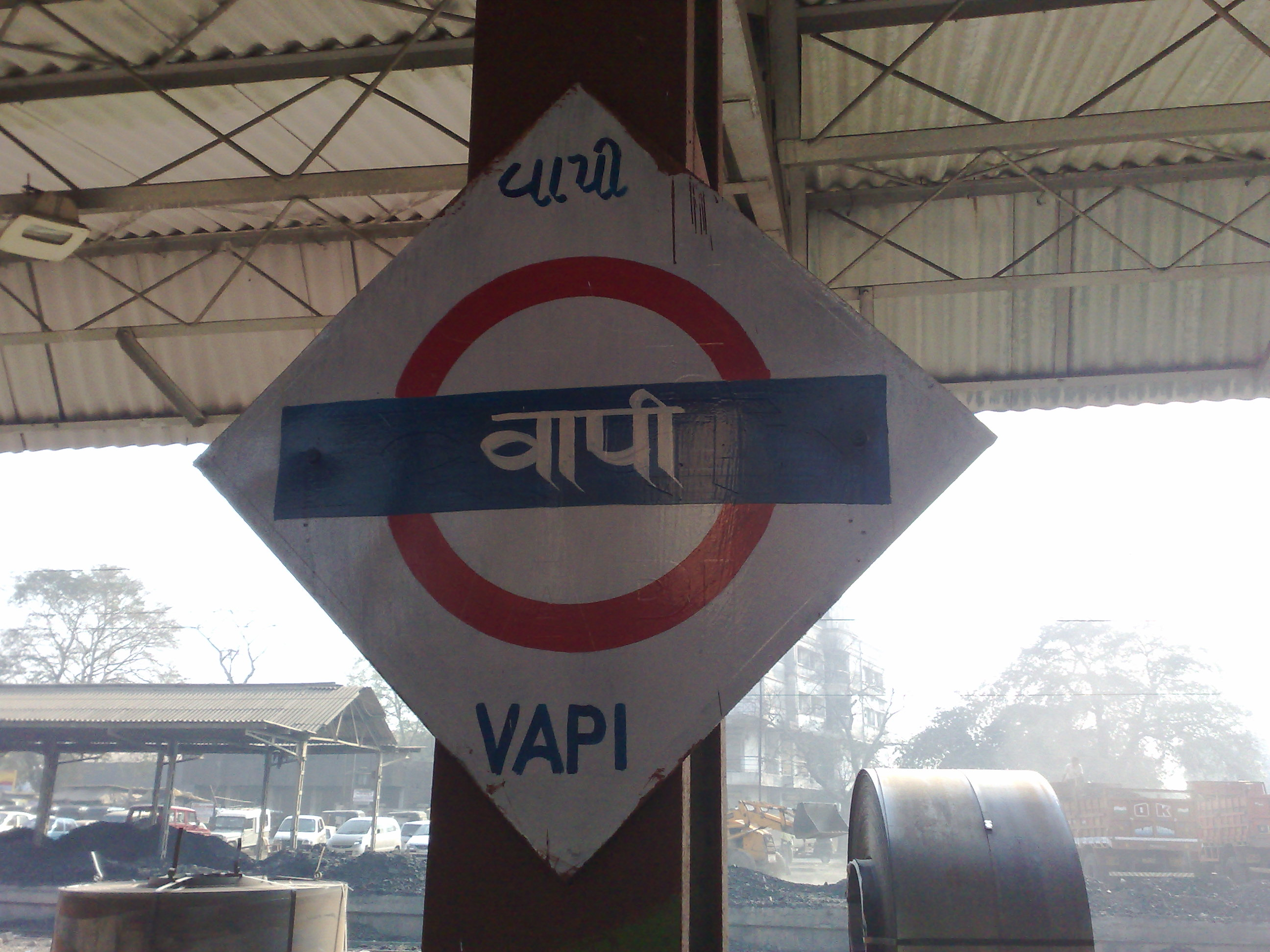
Vapi platformboard

== Trains ==
Following trains start and terminate at Vapi railway station:

- 09069 Vapi–Surat Passenger Special (Note: Limited Period Running Train)
- 59040 Vapi–Virar Shuttle
- 59045 Bandra Terminus–Vapi Passenger
- 09072 Valsad–Vapi Passenger Special (Note: Limited Period Running Train)
- 09005 Vapi—Izzatnagar Express Special

== See also ==
- Vapi
