= Dharasana =

- village
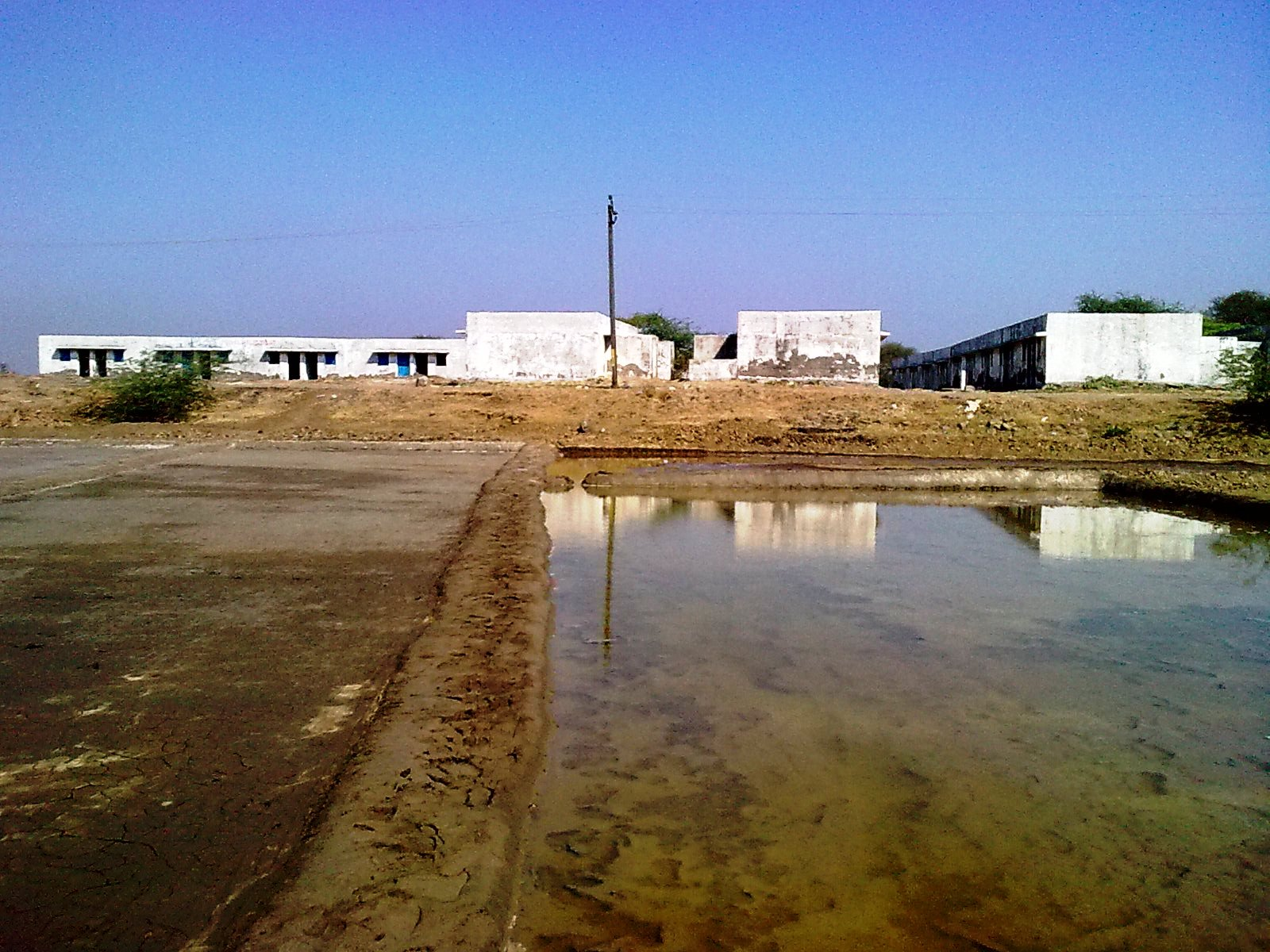
- A salt pan in Dharasana
- Nickname: Danda
- Location in Gujarat, India, Asia, Earth, Dharasana (India)
- Coordinates: 20°41′0″N 72°55′0″E
- Country: India
- State: Gujarat
- District: Valsad

Languages
  - Official: Gujarati, Hindi
- Time zone: UTC+5:30
- PIN: 396375
- Telephone code: 00-91-0260
- Vehicle registration: GJ-15
- Website: gujaratindia.com

Dharasana is a town in Valsad, Gujarat, India, adjacent to Dandi. It shot to worldwide fame in May, 1930 as the site of the Dharasana Satyagraha, an immediate follow up to the Dandi salt march.

Here, British Indian police brutally attacked a group of about 2500 non-violent protestors as they marched to the Dharasana Salt Works, as part of the Salt Satyagraha. The attack received global news coverage and helped turn public opinion against the British rule in India and in favor of Indian freedom fighters. This proved to be one of the most important milestones of the Salt Satyagraha and Civil Disobedience Movement led by Mohandas Karamchand "Mahatma" Gandhi in 1930–31.

== See also ==
- Dharasana Satyagraha
- Salt Satyagraha
- Indian Independence Movement
