= Sadashiv Sathe =

Indian sculptor (1926–2021)

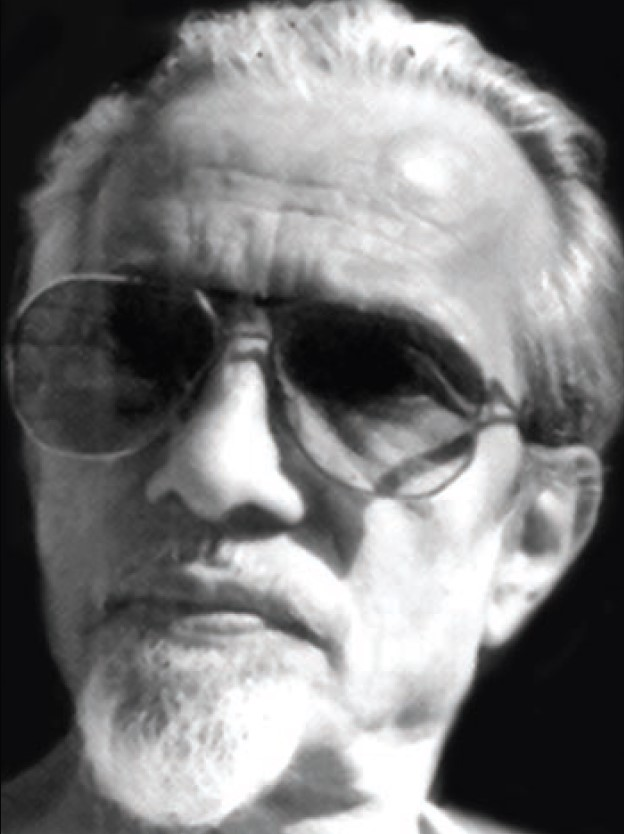
- Born: Sadashiv Sathe; 17 May 1926
- Died: 30 August 2021 (aged 95)
- Other name: Bhau Sathe
- Education: Government diploma in Modelling and Sculpture (1948)
- Occupation: Sculptor
- Known for: Bronze and other sculptures

Sadashiv Sathe or Bhau Sathe (17 May 1926 – 30 August 2021) was an Indian sculptor. His notable works include the 5-metre high statue of Mahatma Gandhi that is part of the main structure of the National Salt Satyagraha Memorial situated at Dandi, Navsari and the 18-foot equestrian statue of Shivaji at the Gateway of India, Mumbai.

== Early life ==
Sathe was first inspired to pursue sculpting as a career from his family's occupation of sculpting Lord Ganesha during the Ganesh Chaturthi festival. He obtained a government diploma in Modelling and Sculpture at Sir J.J. Institute of Applied Art in 1948.

== Career ==
“I believe art should flow. I have experimented with my art, and I hope generations to come continue experimenting. Unless we push limits, how will art grow?”

He worked as a commercial artist with V. Shantaram. He sculpted his first statue of Mahatma Gandhi opposite the Old Town Hall in Delhi in 1952. In 1958, he was offered a scholarship by the Spanish government to study in Spain. Atal Bihari Vajpayee introduced him to Yashwantrao Chavan, who called upon him to cast the 18-feet statue of the Shivaji, the founder of Maratha Kingdom, at the Gateway of India, Mumbai. The statue was unveiled on 26 January 1961 on the occasion of India's Republic Day. He did live sculpting for Lord Mountbatten. He arranged exhibitions at Delhi, Mumbai, London, Moscow, New York, Brussels, The Hague. In 1973, he was invited to Buckingham Palace in London to make a head study sculpture of Prince Philip.

Sathe initiated competitions, such as Pandit Nehru Memorial competition at Nehru Centre, Bombay, and the Shrimati Indira Gandhi National Memorial competition in New Delhi. He was a jury member of the Maharashtra government's art exhibitions and Bombay Art Society's exhibition. He served as an examiner for the Bombay University's art examination.

He once declined to make a statue of Swami Vivekananda, as it was to be put in a temple. Sathe believed that the statue should be put on a rock to protect Vivekananda’s philosophy.

On 24 December 1984, he live-sculpted a bust of Atal Bihari Vajpayee at the residence of Ved Prakash Goyal in Matunga, Mumbai.

He wrote a book of stories related to sculpting - Aakar A Story Of Sculptures.

== Awards ==
- "Gold Medal" received from Indian President Dr. Rajendra Prasad, for making a 9-foot sculpture of Mahatma Gandhi in Delhi in 1954.
- The Art Society of India Award, 2009
- The Bombay Art Society Award, 2009

== Notable works ==
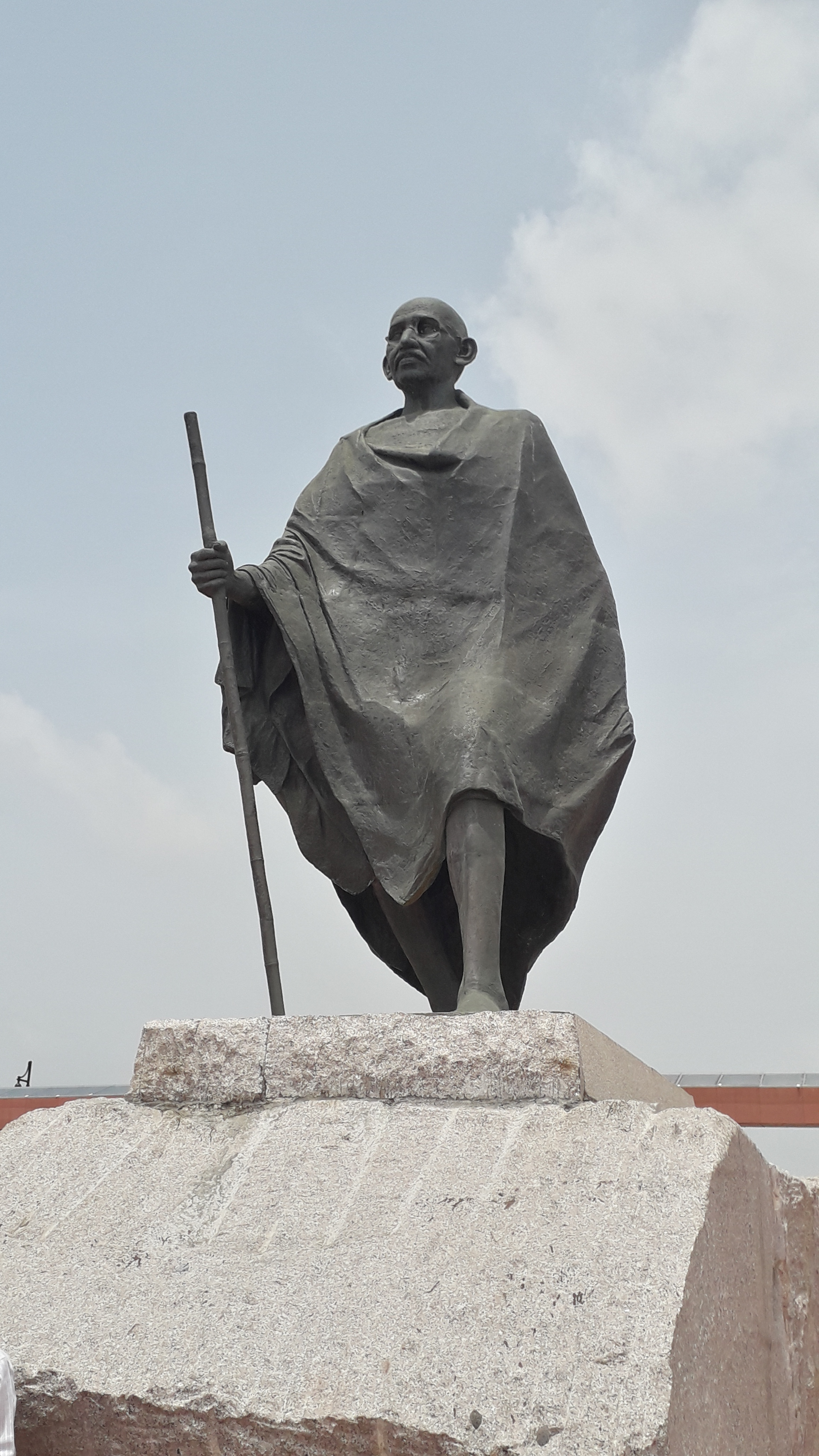
Statue of Gandhi at National Salt Satyagraha Memorial, Dandi, Gujarat

- 16 feet bronze statue of Mahatma Gandhi at National Salt Satyagraha Memorial, Dandi, Gujarat
- 9 feet bronze statue of Mahatma Gandhi opposite Delhi Town Hall
- 12 feet bronze statue of Bal Gangadhar Tilak near Tilak Bridge, New Delhi
- Netaji Subhash Monument in Netaji Park, opposite Red Fort, Delhi
- Equestrian statue of Shivaji in Tikona Park, New Delhi
- Equestrian statue of Rani of Jhansi in Gwalior
- 18 feet equestrian statue of Shivaji at the Gateway of India, Mumbai
- 7 feet marble statue of Justice M.C. Chagla in Bombay High Court
- 18 feet equestrian statue of Chilarai in Guwahati, Assam
- Lasit Baraphukan Group Sculpture in Guwahati, Assam
- Veer Narnarayan memorial in Raipur, Chhattisgarh
- Nagendra Singh's Bust at the International Court of Justice at The Hague
- Mahatma Gandhi Statue in Oslo, Norway
- Mahatma Gandhi bust in Rome
- Prince Philip's sculpture at Buckingham Palace, London
- Lord Mountbatten's head sculpture in his personal collection
- Rajni Patel (Mumbai)
- M. C. Chagla, (Bombay High Court)
- Ardeshir Godrej sculpture
- Mahatma Gandhi- Wardha
- Vinoba Bhave - Wardha
