= Dharasana Satyagraha =

1930 protest in India against British rule

Indian Independence Movement
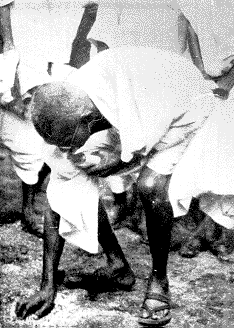
- Mahatma Gandhi, leader of the Salt March, defying salt laws during the Salt March in 1930. Gandhi was arrested on 4 May after announcing his intentions of the Dharasana Satyagraha. Due to his arrest and other Congress leaders, the raid was led by Sarojini Naidu and Maulana Abul Kalam Azad.
Date	21 May 1930
Location	Dharasana, Gujarat, British Raj (now India)
Result	Protestors repulsed; Indian independence movement successfully gains large international attention

Belligerents
Indian National Congress	Indian Imperial Police

Commanders and leaders
Sarojini Naidu Maulana Abul Kalam Azad	British officials (not named)

Strength
2,500	400 (including 6 British officials)

Casualties and losses
2 dead 320 wounded (according to Webb Miller)	None

Dharasana Satyagraha was a protest against the British salt tax in colonial India in May 1930. Following the conclusion of the Salt March to Dandi, Mahatma Gandhi chose a non-violent raid of the Dharasana Salt Works in Gujarat as the next protest against British rule. Hundreds of satyagrahis were beaten by soldiers under British command at Dharasana. The ensuing publicity attracted international attention to the Indian nationalist movement and helped it grow in support domestically, with the legitimacy of British rule in India increasingly being brought into question.

== Background ==
The Indian National Congress, led by Gandhi and Jawaharlal Nehru, publicly issued the Declaration of Independence, or Purna Swaraj, on 26 January 1930. The Salt March to Dandi, concluding with the making of illegal salt by Gandhi on 6 April 1930, launched a nationwide protest against the British salt tax. On 4 May 1930, Gandhi wrote to Lord Irwin, Viceroy of India, explaining his intention to raid the Dharasana Salt Works. He was immediately arrested. The Indian National Congress decided to continue with the proposed plan of action. Many of the Congress leaders were arrested before the planned day, including Nehru head as planned, with Abbas Tyabji, a 76 year old retired judge, leading the march with Gandhi's wife Kasturbai at his side. Both were arrested before reaching Dharasana and sentenced to three months in prison. After their arrests, the peaceful agitation continued under the leadership of Sarojini Naidu and Maulana Abul Kalam Azad. Some Congress leaders disagreed with Gandhi's promotion of a woman to lead the march. Hundreds of Indian National Congress volunteers started marching towards the site of the Dharasana Salt Works. Several times, Naidu and the satyagrahis approached the salt works, before being turned back by police. At one point they sat down and waited for twenty-eight hours. Hundreds more were arrested.

== Beatings ==
Naidu was aware that violence against the satyagrahis was a threat, and warned them, "You must not use any violence under any circumstances. You will be beaten, but you must not resist: you must not even raise a hand to ward off blows." On 21 May, the satyagrahis tried to pull away the barbed wire protecting the salt pans. The police charged and began clubbing them.

Not one of the marchers even raised an arm to fend off the blows. They went down like ten-pins. From where I stood I heard the sickening whacks of the clubs on unprotected skulls. The waiting crowd of watchers groaned and sucked in their breaths in sympathetic pain at every blow.

Those struck down fell sprawling, unconscious or writhing in pain with fractured skulls or broken shoulders. In two or three minutes the ground was quilted with bodies. Great patches of blood widened on their white clothes. The survivors without breaking ranks silently and doggedly marched on until struck down. When every one of the first column was knocked down stretcher bearers rushed up unmolested by the police and carried off the injured to a thatched hut which had been arranged as a temporary hospital.

There were not enough stretcher-bearers to carry off the wounded; I saw eighteen injured being carried off simultaneously, while forty-two still lay bleeding on the ground awaiting stretcher-bearers. The blankets used as stretchers were sodden with blood.

At times the spectacle of unresisting men being methodically bashed into a bloody pulp sickened me so much I had to turn away....I felt an indefinable sense of helpless rage and loathing, almost as much against the men who were submitting unresistingly to being beaten as against the police wielding the clubs...

Bodies toppled over in threes and fours, bleeding from great gashes on their scalps. Group after group walked forward, sat down, and submitted to being beaten into insensibility without raising an arm to fend off the blows. Finally the police became enraged by the non-resistance....They commenced savagely kicking the seated men in the abdomen and testicles. The injured men writhed and squealed in agony, which seemed to inflame the fury of the police....The police then began dragging the sitting men by the arms or feet, sometimes for a hundred yards, and throwing them into ditches.

Miller's first attempts at telegraphing the story to his publisher in England were censored by the British telegraph operators in India. Only after threatening to expose British censorship was his story allowed to pass. The story appeared in 1,350 newspapers throughout the world and was read into the official record of the United States Senate by Senator John J. Blaine.

== Aftermath ==
Vithalbhai Patel, former Speaker of the Assembly, watched the brutality and remarked:

All hope of reconciling India with the British Empire is lost forever. I can understand any government's taking people into custody and punishing them for breaches of the law, but I cannot understand how any government that calls itself civilized could deal as savagely and brutally with non-violent, unresisting men as the British have this morning."

In response to the beatings and the press coverage, Lord Irwin, Viceroy of India, wrote to King George:

Your Majesty can hardly fail to have read with amusement the accounts of the severe battles for the Salt Depot in Dharasana. The police for a long time tried to refrain from action. After a time this became impossible, and they had to resort to sterner methods. A good many people suffered minor injuries in consequence.

Miller later wrote that he went to the hospital where the wounded were being treated, and "counted 320 injured, many still insensible with fractured skulls, others writhing in agony from kicks in the testicles and stomach....Scores of the injured had received no treatment for hours and two had died."
