= History of the salt tax in British India =

Taxation of salt has occurred in India since the earliest times. However, this tax was greatly increased when the British East India Company began to establish its rule over provinces in India. In 1835, special taxes were imposed on Indian salt to facilitate its import. This paid huge dividends for the traders of the British East India Company. When the Crown took over the administration of India from the Company in 1858, the taxes were not revoked.

The stringent salt taxes imposed by the British were vehemently condemned by the Indian public. In 1885, at the first session of the Indian National Congress in Bombay, a prominent Congress Leader, S. A. Swaminatha Iyer, raised the issue of the salt tax. There were further protests throughout the late 19th and early 20th centuries culminating in Mahatma Gandhi's Salt Satyagraha in 1930. This satyagraha was followed by other satyagrahas in other parts of the country.

After the arrest of Gandhi, Sarojini Naidu led the satyagrahis to Dharasana Salt works in Gujarat and was arrested by the police officers. C. Rajagopalachari broke the Salt Laws at Vedaranyam, in Madras Province in the same year. Thousands courted arrest and were imprisoned in large numbers. The administration eventually relented and invited Mahatma Gandhi to England to attend the Second Round Table Conference. Gandhi's Dandi March got wide news coverage and proved to be a turning point in the history of India's independence movement.

The salt tax continued to remain in effect and was repealed only when Jawaharlal Nehru became the prime minister of the interim government in 1946. After independence, a salt tax was later re-introduced in India via the Salt Cess Act, 1953, before being scrapped and succeeded by the Goods and Services Tax in 2017, which does not tax salt. In Pakistan, table salt is currently taxed but iodised salt is not.

== Taxation of salt ==
An early mention of salt taxation is found in Guanzi, a book written in China c. 300 BCE, which proposes various methods for its implementation. The recommendations of Guanzi became the official salt policy of early Chinese Emperors. At one point, salt taxes constituted over one-half of China's revenues and contributed to the construction of the Great Wall of China.

Salt was also important in ancient times, especially within the Roman Empire. The first of the great Roman roads, the Via Salaria, or Salt Road, was built for transporting salt. However, unlike the Chinese, Romans did not monopolize salt.

In Britain, there are references to salt taxes in the Domesday Book but they had died out before patents were given in Tudor times. Reintroduced in 1641 in the Commonwealth period there was such outcry that they were withdrawn on the restoration of the monarchy in 1660 and not reinstated till 1693 under William III, with duty set at two shillings a bushel on foreign salt, one shilling on native salt with exemption for fishery salt. In 1696 the tax was doubled and remained in force till abolished in 1825. There were probably 600 full-time officials employed in the collection of the taxes.

== Taxation of salt in India ==
=== Salt-producing areas in India ===
Salt has been produced all along the Rann of Kutch on the west coast of India for the past 5,000 years. The Rann of Kutch is an extensive marshland that is cut off from the rest of the Indian subcontinent during monsoons when the seas inundate the low-lying areas. However, when the seawater evaporates during summer, it leaves behind a crust of salt which accumulates as salt pans. This salt is collected by laborers called malangas.

On the east coast, salt could be obtained extensively along the coast of Orissa (known today as Odisha). These salt pans are called khalaris in Oriya, and the salt produced from them is known as kartach. This salt was known for its whiteness and considered to be of the finest quality in all of India; it was also quite cheap. Salt in Indian in general was both affordable and readily available before the British imposed artificial trade barriers in the late 18th century. There has always been a demand for Orissa salt in the neighboring Bengal.

=== Taxation of salt before British rule ===
Salt is a commodity that had been taxed in India ever since the time of the Mauryas. Taxes on salt have been prevalent even during the time of Chandragupta Maurya. The Arthashastra, which describes the different duties of the people, says that a special officer called lavananadhyaksa was appointed to collect the salt tax. Taxes were also imposed on imported salt. However, they accounted for 25 percent of the total value of the salt.

In Bengal, there was a salt tax in force during the era of the Mughal Empire, which was 5% for Hindus and 2.5% for Muslims.

=== Taxation of salt by the British East India Company ===
In 1759, two years after its victory at the Battle of Plassey, the British East India Company came into possession of land near Calcutta where there were salt works. Utilizing this opportunity to make money, they doubled the land rent and imposed transit charges on the transportation of salt.

In 1764, following the victory at the Battle of Buxar, the British began to control all the revenues of Bengal, Bihar and Orissa. Robert Clive, who returned as governor in 1765, made the sale of tobacco, betel nut, and salt, the monopoly of the senior officers of the British East India Company. Contracts were given to deliver salt to depots, and merchants were required to buy from these depots.

The outrage was expressed by the authorities in England who declared:

We consider it too disgraceful, and below the dignity of the present situation, to allow such a monopoly.

Clive responded by offering the company 1,200,000 per annum from the profits made.

However, the authorities in England were stubborn, and due to the pressure they exerted, the monopoly of tobacco and betel nut was stopped on 1 September 1767, followed by the annulment of the salt monopoly on 7 October 1768.

In 1772, the governor-general, Warren Hastings, brought the salt trade once again under the company's control. The salt works were leased out to farmers who agreed to deliver salt at a fixed rate to the company and sold the leases to the highest bidders. Corruption dealt a severe blow to the company and the revenue from salt trade fell to 80,000 rupees by 1780. This, along with the exploitation of the malangas or salt workers by their landlords, forced Hastings to introduce a new system for controlling the salt trade in India.

In 1780 Hastings brought the salt trade once again under government control, dividing the infrastructure into agencies, each under the control of an agent and governed by a controller. This system persisted, with minor modifications, until India's independence in 1947. Under this new system, the malangas sold the salt to the agents at a particular price, initially fixed at 2 rupees a Maund with a tax of 1.1 to 1.5 rupees a maund. This new system was a success, and in 1781–82, the salt revenue was 2,960,130 rupees. The company received salt revenue of 6,257,750 rupees in 1784–85.

From 1788 onwards, the company began selling salt wholesalers by auction. As a result, the British East India Company increased the tax to 3.25 rupees a maund, and the wholesale price of salt increased from 1.25 to about 4 rupees a maund. This was an exorbitant rate that few could afford.

As the salt production in Cheshire in England rapidly expanded, the Empire began seeking overseas markets; however Cheshire salt could not compete with the price and quality of Orissa salt. When the British proposal to buy up all Orissa salt met with resistance, they banned Orissa salt in Bengal. However, Cheshire salt still could not compete, as salt from Orissa still readily flowed in across Bengal's difficult-to-patrol jungle border. In an attempt to check smuggling, the British sent armies into Orissa, resulting in the conquest of Orissa in 1803.

By 1804, the British had monopolized the trade of Orissa salt. In return, they advanced money to the malangas against future salt production, resulting in the malangas becoming debtors to the British, virtually becoming economic slaves. The Orissa zamindars, who had earlier controlled the local salt trade, were alarmed at the sudden loss of income and tried to persuade the malanga not to work for the British, but to no avail.

In the early 19th century, to make the salt tax more profitable and reduce smuggling, the East India Company established customs checkpoints throughout Bengal. G. H. Smith established a "customs line", which was the boundary across which salt transportation involved payment of high customs duties. In the 1840s a thorn fence was erected along the western frontiers of Bengal province to prevent salt smuggling. Eventually, after 1857, the thorn fence grew to be 2,500 miles long.

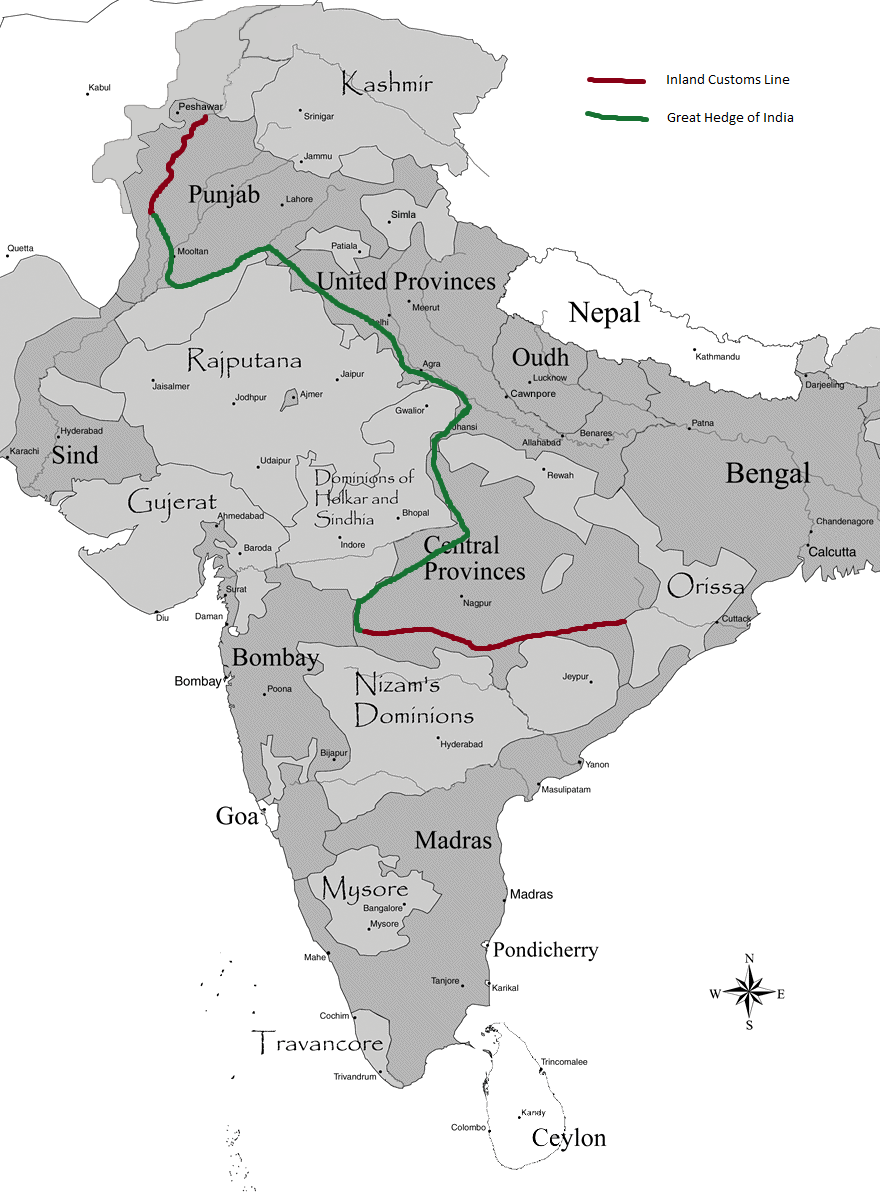
Inland Customs Line (red), incorporating the Great Hedge of India or Indian Salt Hedge (green), built by the British colonial rulers of India.

A customs line was established, which stretched across the whole of India, which in 1869 extended from the Indus to the Mahanadi in Madras, a distance of 2,300 miles; and it was guarded by nearly 12,000 men and petty officers... it consisted principally of an immense impenetrable hedge of thorny trees and bushes, supplemented by stone wall and ditches, across which no human being or beast of burden or vehicle could pass without being subject to detention or search.

— (Strachey and Strachey 1882, 219–220)

=== Taxation of salt by the British authorities ===
The taxation laws introduced by the British East India Company were in vogue during the ninety years of British Raj which followed the demise of the company. The construction of a fence to prevent smuggling of salt, which was commenced during the company's rule, was completed during this period. Sources indicate that by 1858, British India derived 10% of its revenues from its monopoly of salt. However, by the end of the century, the tax on salt had been considerably reduced. In 1880, income from salt amounted to 7 million pounds.

In 1900 and 1905, India was one of the largest producers of salt in the world, with a yield of 1,021,426 metric tons and 1,212,600 metric tonnes respectively.

In 1923, under the viceroyalty of Lord Reading, a bill was passed doubling the salt tax. However, another proposal made in 1927 was subsequently vetoed. It was one of Finance Member Basil Blackett's first deeds when producing his first budget in February 1923.

Annual tax revenue
Year	Rs (million)	£ (million)
1929–30	67	5.025
1930–31	68	5.1
1931–32	87	6.525
1932–33	102	7.65

=== Salt laws ===
The first laws to regulate the salt tax were made by the British East India Company.

In 1835, the government appointed a salt commission to review the existing salt tax. It recommended that Indian salt should be taxed to enable the sale of imported English salt. Consequently, salt was imported from Liverpool, resulting in an increase in salt rates. Subsequently, the government set up a monopoly on the manufacture of salt by the Salt Act. Production of salt was made an offense punishable with six months' imprisonment. The committee also recommended that Indian salt be sold in maunds of 100. However, they were sold in much lesser quantities. In 1888, the salt tax was enhanced by Lord Dufferin as a temporary measure. Cheshire salt imported from the United Kingdom was available at a much cheaper rate. However, Cheshire salt was of inferior quality compared to India's salt. India's salt imports reached 2,582,050 metric tons by 1851.

In 1878, a uniform salt tax policy was adopted for the whole of India, both British India as well as the princely states. Both production, as well as possession of salt, were made unlawful by this policy. The salt tax, which was one rupee and thirteen annas per maund in Bombay, Madras, the Central Provinces, and the princely states of South India, was increased to two rupees and eight annas and decreased from three rupees and four annas in Bengal and Assam to two rupees and fourteen annas, and from three rupees to two rupees and eight annas in North India.

Section 39 of the Bombay Salt Act, which was the same as Section 16-17 of the Indian Salt Act, empowered a salt-revenue official to break into places where salt was being illegally manufactured and seize the illegal salt being manufactured. Section 50 of the Bombay Salt Act prohibited the shipping of salt overseas.

The India Salt Act of 1882 included regulations enforcing a government monopoly on the collection and manufacture of salt. Salt could be manufactured and handled only at official government salt depots, with a tax of Rs 1-4-0 on each maund (82 pounds).

In 1944 the Central Legislative Assembly passed the Excises and Salt Act (Act No. I of 1944), which, though modified in India and Pakistan, remain in force in Bangladesh.

A new salt tax was introduced to the Republic of India, via the Salt Cess, 1953, which received the assent of the president on 26 December 1953, and was brought into force on 2 January 1954:

Then again there is a still more wretched creature, who bears the name of a laborer, whose income may be fixed at thirty-five rupees per annum. If he, with his wife and three children, consumes twenty-four seers [49 lb] of salt, he must pay a salt duty of two rupees and seven annas, or in other words 7½ percent income tax. Now we leave it to our readers to judge, whether the ryots and the laborers can procure salt in the quantities they require. We can positively state from our own experience, that an ordinary ryot can never procure more than two-thirds of what he requires, and that a laborer not more than half.

== Early protests against the British salt tax ==
Since the introduction of the first taxes on salt by the British East India Company, the laws were subjected to fervent criticism. The Chamber of Commerce in Bristol was one of the first to submit a petition opposing the salt tax:

The price to the consumer here [in England] is but about 30s per ton instead of 20 pounds per ton as in India; and if it was necessary to abolish the Salt tax at home some years since it appears to your petitioners that the millions of her Majesty's subjects of India have a much stronger claim for remission in their case, wretchedly poor as they are, and essentially necessary as salt is to their daily sustenance, and to the prevention of disease in such a climate.

The salt tax was criticized at a public meeting at Cuttack in February 1888. In the first session of the Indian National Congress held in 1885 in Bombay, a prominent Congress member, S. A. Saminatha Iyer pleaded against the tax:

It would be unjust and unrighteous if the tax on salt should be increased. It is a necessary article both for human as well as animal well-being... it would be bad policy and a retrograde movement to raise the tax, especially at a time when the poor millions of India are anxiously looking forward to a further reduction of the tax... As any increase, therefore, of this tax will fall heavily upon the masses of the people of the land, I would strongly urge upon the attention of this Congress the necessity of its entering its strong protest against any attempt on the part of Government to raise the tax on salt.

At the Allahabad session of the Indian National Congress in 1888, Narayan Vishnu, a delegate from Poona vehemently opposed the Indian Salt Act. A resolution was passed wherein the delegates present declared 'That this Congress do put on record its disapproval of the recent enhancement of the salt tax as involving a perceptible increase to the burden of the poorer classes, as also the 'partial adoption, in a time of peace and plenty, of the only financial reserve of the Empire.' The 1892 session at Allahabad concluded thus: '... We do not know when the tax will be reduced. So that there is every necessity for our repeating this prayer in the interests of the masses, and we earnestly hope that it will be granted before long'. A similar sort of protest was also issued at the Congress session at Ahmedabad.

The salt tax was also protested by eminent people like Dadabhai Naoroji. On 14 August 1894, he thundered in the House of Commons:

Then the Salt Tax, the cruelest Revenue imposed in any civilized country provided Rs. 8,600,000/- and that with the opium 'formed the bulk of the revenue of India, which was drawn from the wretchedness of the people... It mattered not what the State received was called – tax, rent, revenue, or by any other name they liked – the simple fact of the matter was, that out of a certain annual national production the State took a certain portion. Now it would not also matter much about the portion taken by the State if that portion, as in this country, returned to people themselves, from whom it was raised. But the misfortune and the evil was that much of this portion did not return to the people and that the whole system of Revenue and the economic condition of the people became unnatural and oppressive, with dangers to the rulers. So long as the system went on, so long must the people go on, living wretched lives. There was a constant draining away of India's resources, and she could never, therefore, be a prosperous country. Not only that, but in time India must perish, and with it perish the British Empire.

In 1895, George Hamilton stated at a session of the House of Commons that:

Time has, however, now come when the Government finds itself in possession of larger surpluses and it is, therefore, its duty as guardian of public exchequer, to reduce taxation on salt.

When the salt tax was doubled in the year 1923, it was sharply criticized in a report by the Taxation Enquiry Committee which was published two years later. This raise also evoked sharp reactions from Indian nationalists. In 1929, Pandit Nilakantha Das demanded the repeal of the salt tax in the Imperial Legislature but his pleas fell on deaf ears. In 1930, Orissa was close to open rebellion.

== Mahatma Gandhi and the salt tax ==
Mohandas (Mahatma) Gandhi had written his first article on the salt tax in 1891 in the periodical The Vegetarian. While in South Africa, he wrote in The Indian Opinion:

The tax levied on salt in India has always been a subject of criticism. This time it has been criticized by the well-known Dr. Hutchinson who says that 'it is a great shame for the British Government in India to continue it, while a similar tax previously in force in Japan has been abolished. Salt is an essential article in our dietary. It could be said that the increasing incidence of leprosy in India was due to the salt tax. Dr. Hutchinson considers the salt tax a barbarous practice, which ill becomes the British Government.

In 1909, Mahatma Gandhi wrote in his Hind Swaraj from South Africa, urging the British administration to abolish the salt tax.

== Mahatma Gandhi's Salt March ==
Mahatma Gandhi and other satyagrahis during the Dandi March

At the historic Lahore session of the Indian National Congress on 31 December 1929 in which Purna Swaraj was declared, a passing reference was made to the infamous and oppressive salt law and resolved that a way should be found to oppose it. In the first week of March 1930, Mahatma Gandhi wrote to Lord Irwin apprising him of the prevailing social, economic and political conditions in the country.

On 12 March 1930, Gandhi embarked on a satyagraha with 78 followers from Sabarmati Ashram to Dandi on the Arabian Sea coast. This march, known as the Dandi March, was sensationalized by the international press; film clippings and pictures of Mahatma Gandhi were relayed to distant corners of the world. Gandhi reached Dandi on 5 April 1930. After his morning bhajan, he waded in to the sea shore and picked up a handful of salt, proclaiming that with the handful of salt he was proclaiming the end of the British Empire. The police arrived and arrested thousands of national leaders including Gandhi. Mahatma Gandhi's bold defiance of the salt law encouraged other Indians to break the law as well.

== Other salt satyagrahas ==
Soon after the conclusion of the Salt satyagraha at Dandi, Gandhi intended to lead a pack of satyagrahis to the Dharasana Salt Works in Gujarat, but was arrested by the police. A few days later, Congress leader Abbas Tyabji was also arrested. So the mantle fell upon Sarojini Naidu to lead the marchers at Dharasana. They marched to Dharasana, where they were stopped by a detachment of police. The non-violent satyagrahis confronted the police and were beaten. American journalist Webb Miller, who witnessed the gruesome scene, counted around 320 bodies. His reporting on the violence at the Dharasana Salt Works was later credited for helping turn world opinion against British colonial rule of India.

In April 1930, Congress leader Chakravarti Rajagopalachari led a salt satyagraha in Vedaranyam, Madras province. The satyagrahis reached Vedaranyam on the east coast of India on 28 April, where they prepared salt illegally on 30 April.

== Aftermath ==
The British authorities turned a deaf ear to the massive protests against the salt tax which rocked India during the early 1930s. The Dandi March was only partially successful. Though it forced the British rulers to come to the discussion table, the salt tax continued. It was only on 6 April 1946 that Mahatma Gandhi made a formal request to Sir Archibald Rowlands, the finance member of the Viceroy's Executive Council, to remove the oppressive salt tax. Rowlands formally issued an order abolishing the salt tax, but the order was vetoed by the Viceroy, Lord Wavell. The salt tax continued in force until March 1947, when it was abolished by the Interim Government of India headed by Jawaharlal Nehru, by the then-Finance Minister Liaquat Ali Khan.

A modified salt tax was later introduced, to the Republic of India, via the Salt Cess Act, 1953, which received the assent of the President on 26 December 1953, and was brought into force on 2 January 1954. The tax, applied at a rate of 14 paise per 40 kg of salt produced, was criticised for its low collections, with the government spending twice as much to collect the tax as it earned from it. This was replaced in 2017 by the Goods and Services Tax overhaul, which officially places salt in the 0% taxation category.

In Pakistan, raw table salt is taxed while iodised salt is not, which has been criticised by salt manufacturers as they need to pay tax on the salt that they later iodise and sell tax-free.

== See also ==
- Gabelle – French salt tax
