= National Salt Satyagraha Memorial =

Memorial in Dandi, Gujarat, India

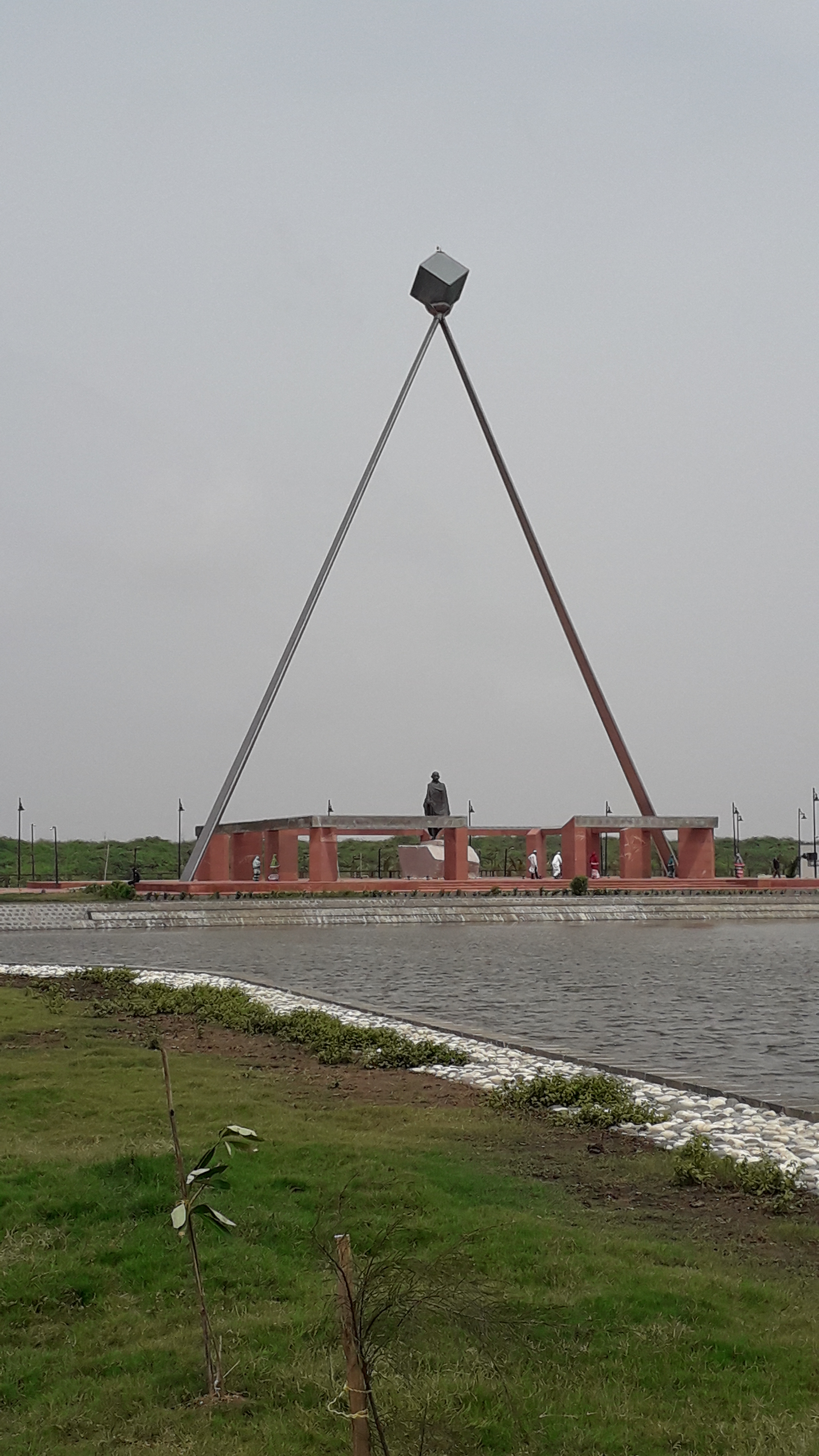
- Established: 30 January 2019
- Location: Dandi, Gujarat, India
- Coordinates: 20°53′29″N 72°47′59″E
- Type: Memorial
- Website: nssm.in

The National Salt Satyagraha Memorial or Dandi Memorial is a memorial in Dandi, Gujarat, India, that honors the activists and participants of the Salt Satyagraha, an act of nonviolent civil disobedience in colonial India which was led by Mahatma Gandhi in 1930. The memorial is spread over a 15 acres (61,000 m^{2}) and is located in the coastal town of Dandi, where the Salt March ended on 5 April 1930 and the British salt monopoly was broken by producing salt by boiling sea water. The project was developed at an estimated cost of ₹89 crore (US$9.2 million).

== History ==
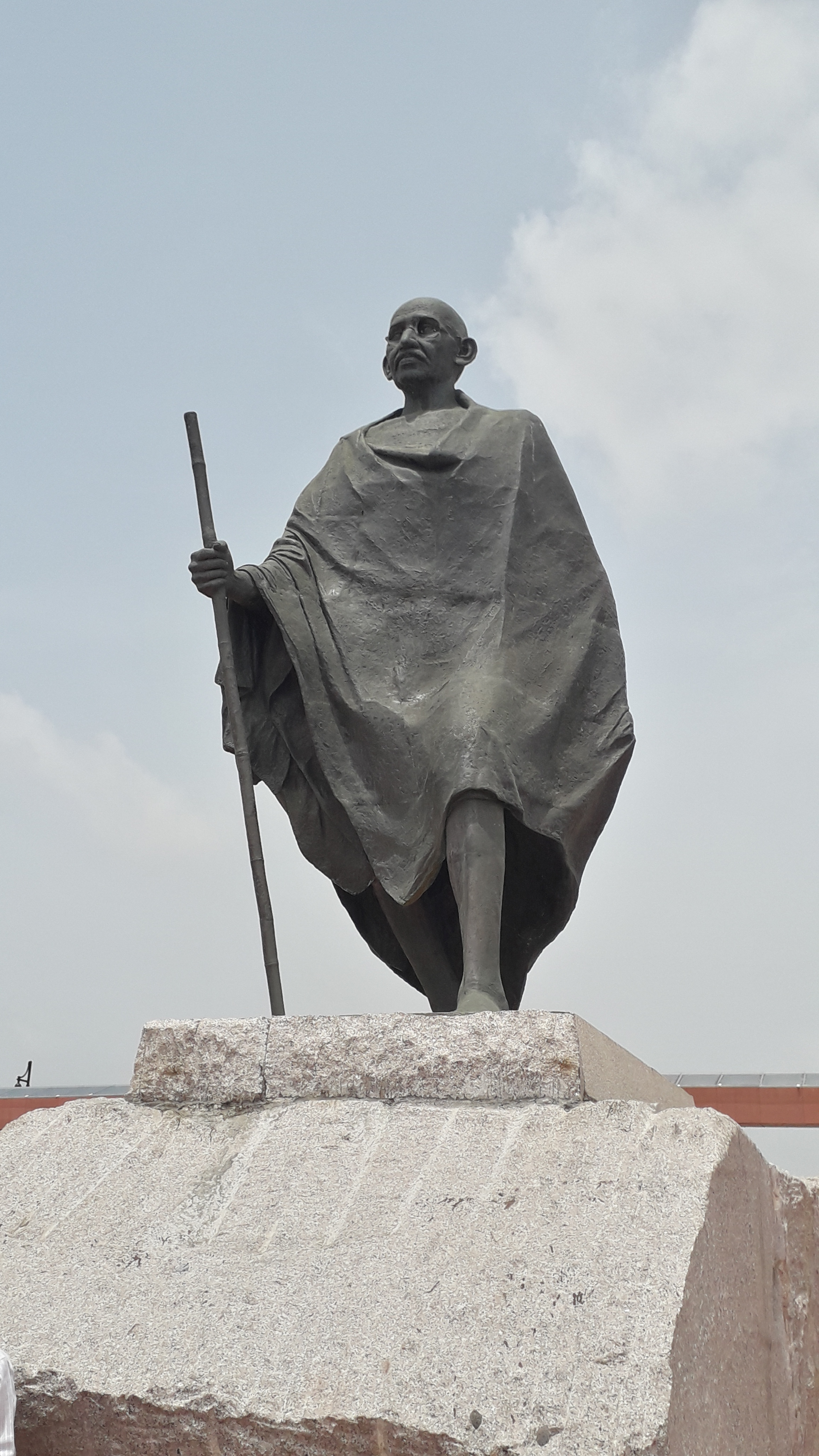
Statue of Gandhi under Main Structure

The project to develop the National Salt Satyagrah Memorial was conceived and advised by the High Level Dandi Memorial Committee (HLDMC) and was endorsed by the Ministry of Culture, Government of India. The IIT Bombay provided services as a Design Coordination Agency. The memorial was inaugurated on 30 January 2019, the death anniversary of Mahatma Gandhi, by Indian Prime Minister Narendra Modi.

== Features ==
=== Monument ===
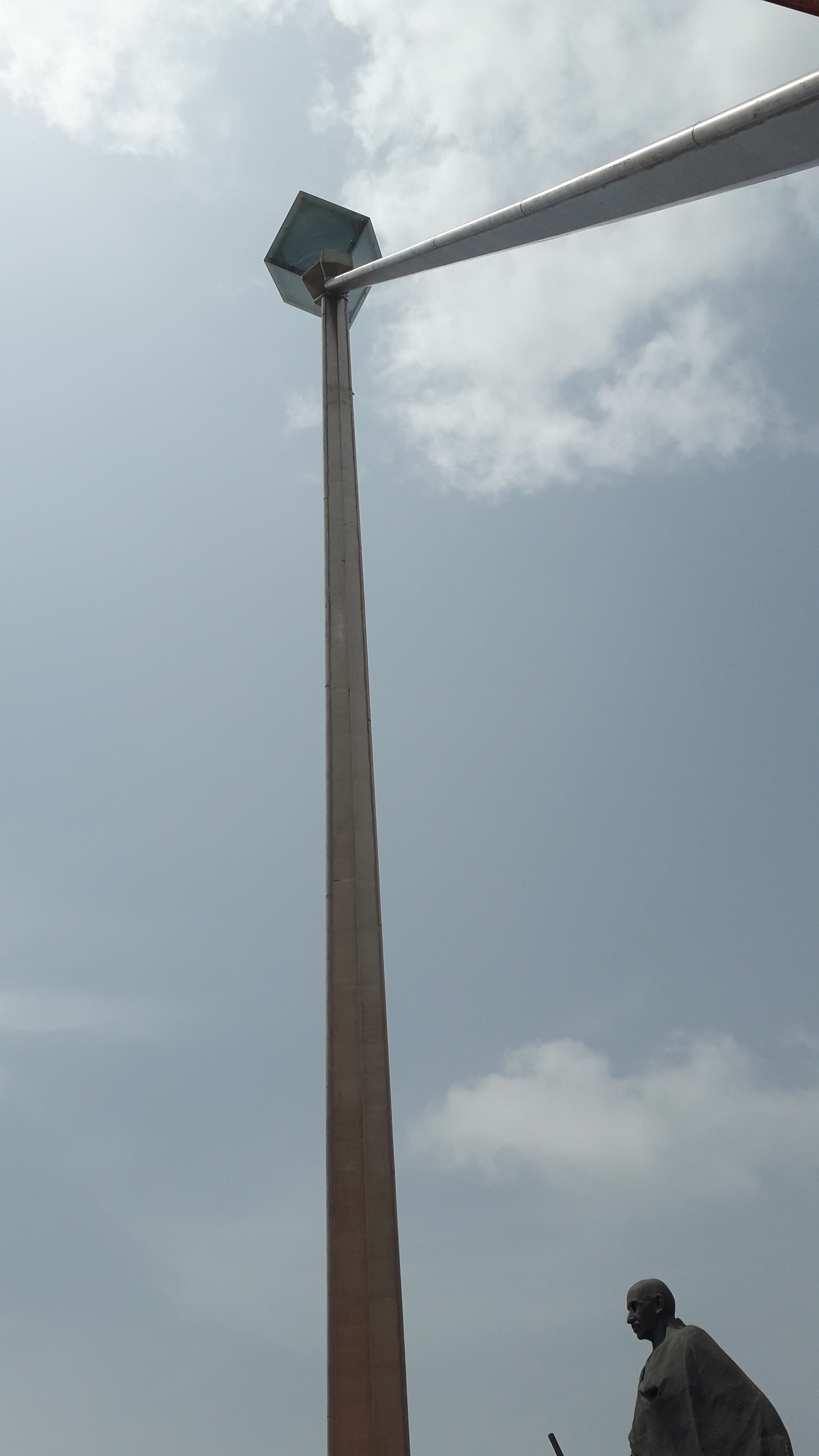
the main Structure from below

The monument is a 40-metre (130 ft) steel frame in "A" shape, symbolizing two hands. In order to protect it from sea coast weather, it is made up of a non-corroding material. At the apex of the monument, there is a 2.5-tonne (2,500 kg) glass cube representing the salt crystal. The cube is illuminated by laser lights at night which creates the illusion of a pyramid. Under the canopy of the cube, there is a 5-metre (16 ft) high statue of Gandhi projecting the forward march. In 2014, the statue was cast in sixty separate pieces at Mumbai, assembled into one statue and transported to Dandi, taking more than two years to complete. It is sculpted by Sadashiv Sathe.

=== Depiction of march ===
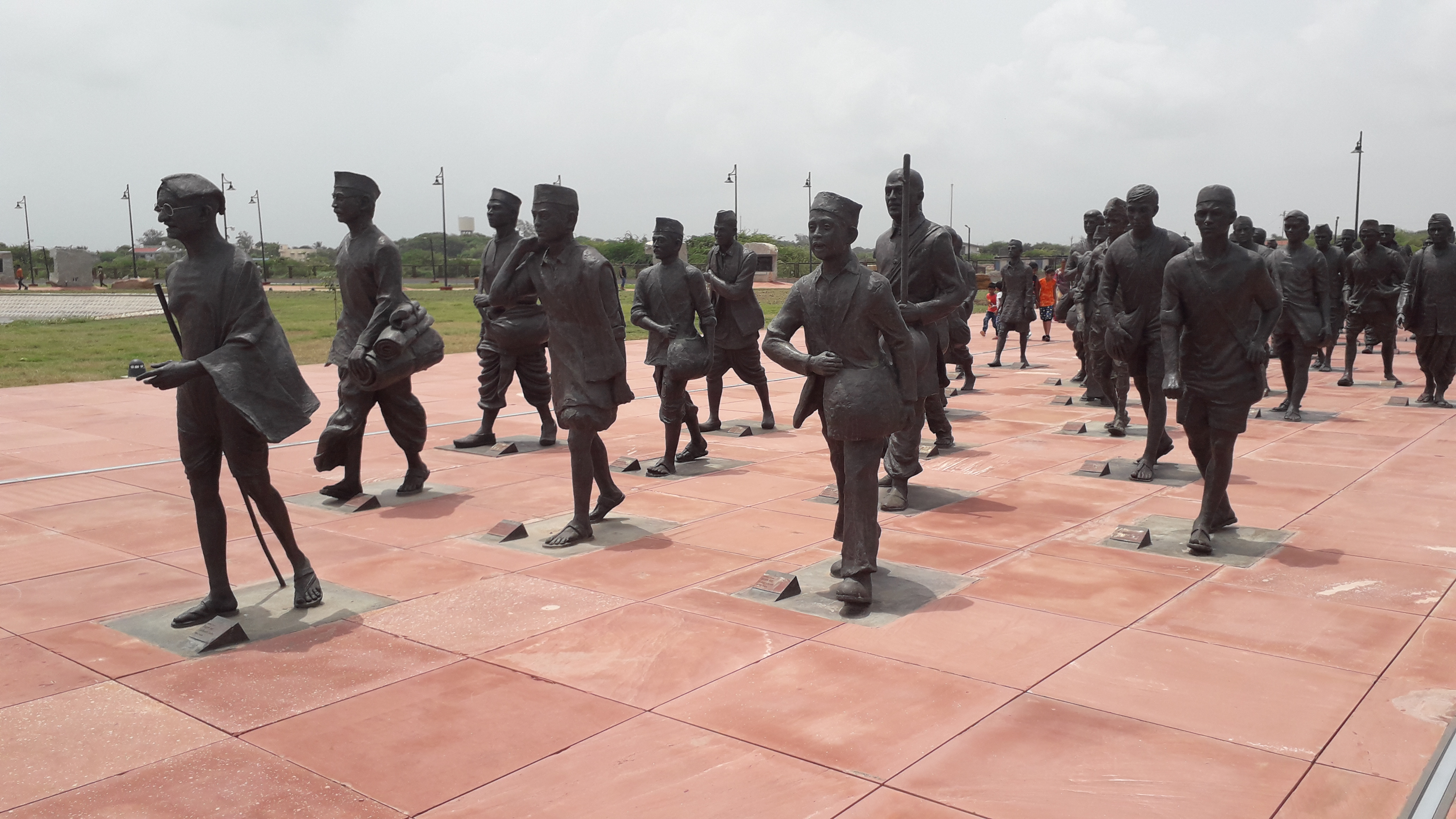
March Depiction

To the left of the main memorial there is a life sized statue of Gandhi with 78 volunteers. These statues are made of bronze. An Open Call for sculptors was made and 40 sculptors were selected from India, Austria, Bulgaria, Burma, Japan, Sri Lanka, Tibet, UK and United States. Each sculptor created two sculptures each. After the clay sculptures had been completed, molds and fiber casts were made and the sculptures were cast in silicon-bronze alloy by Studio Sukriti in Jaipur.

=== Artificial lake ===
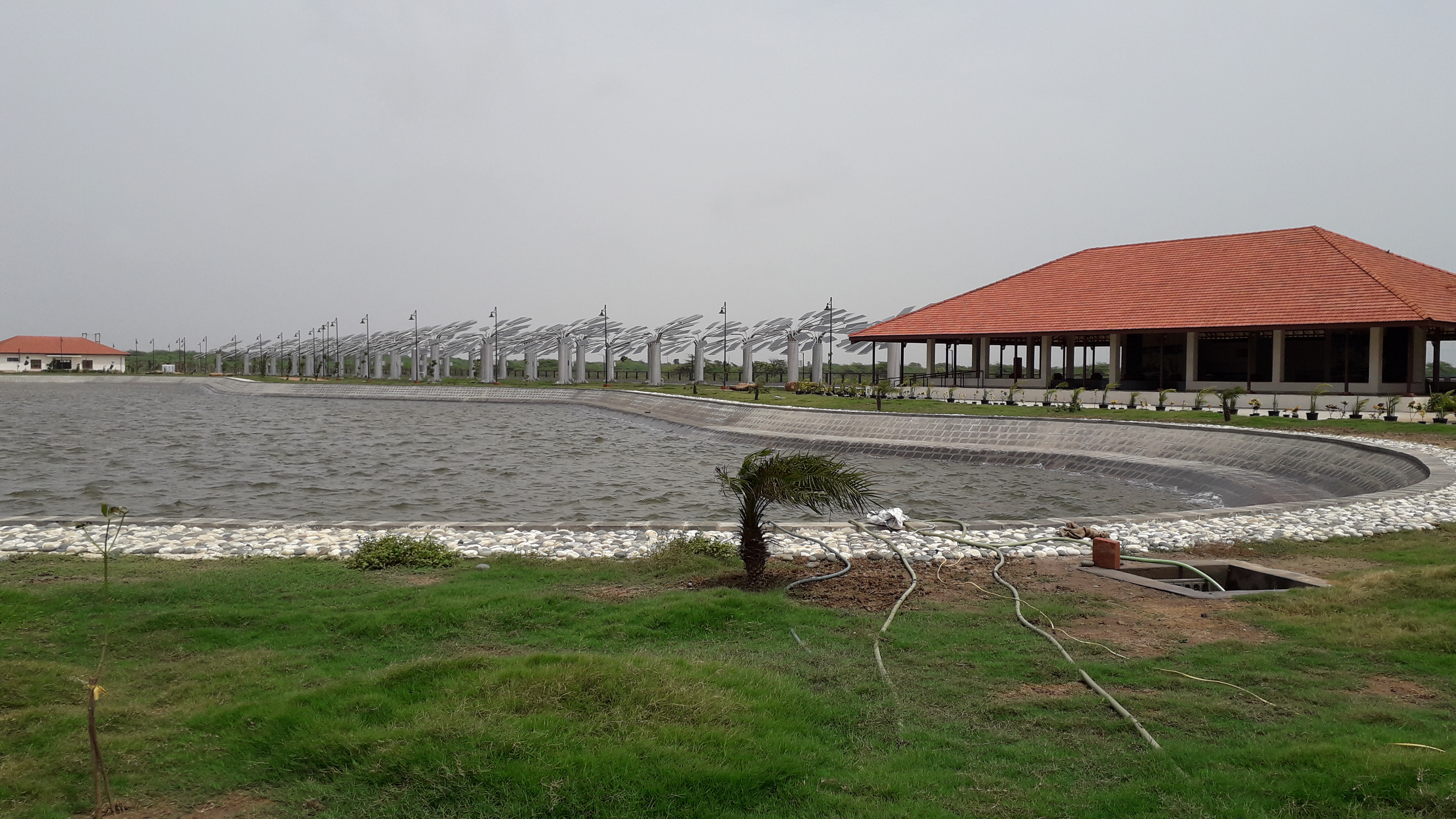
Artificial Lake and Solar panels in flower shape seen in background

An artificial lake was created to symbolize the seashore aspect of the Salt Satyagraha. The lake is a non-permeable, geotextile based lake which is sealed from the bottom and top to prevent salt infiltration. The lake is filled with harvested rainwater which is treated to produce sparkling clear water.

=== Solar trees ===
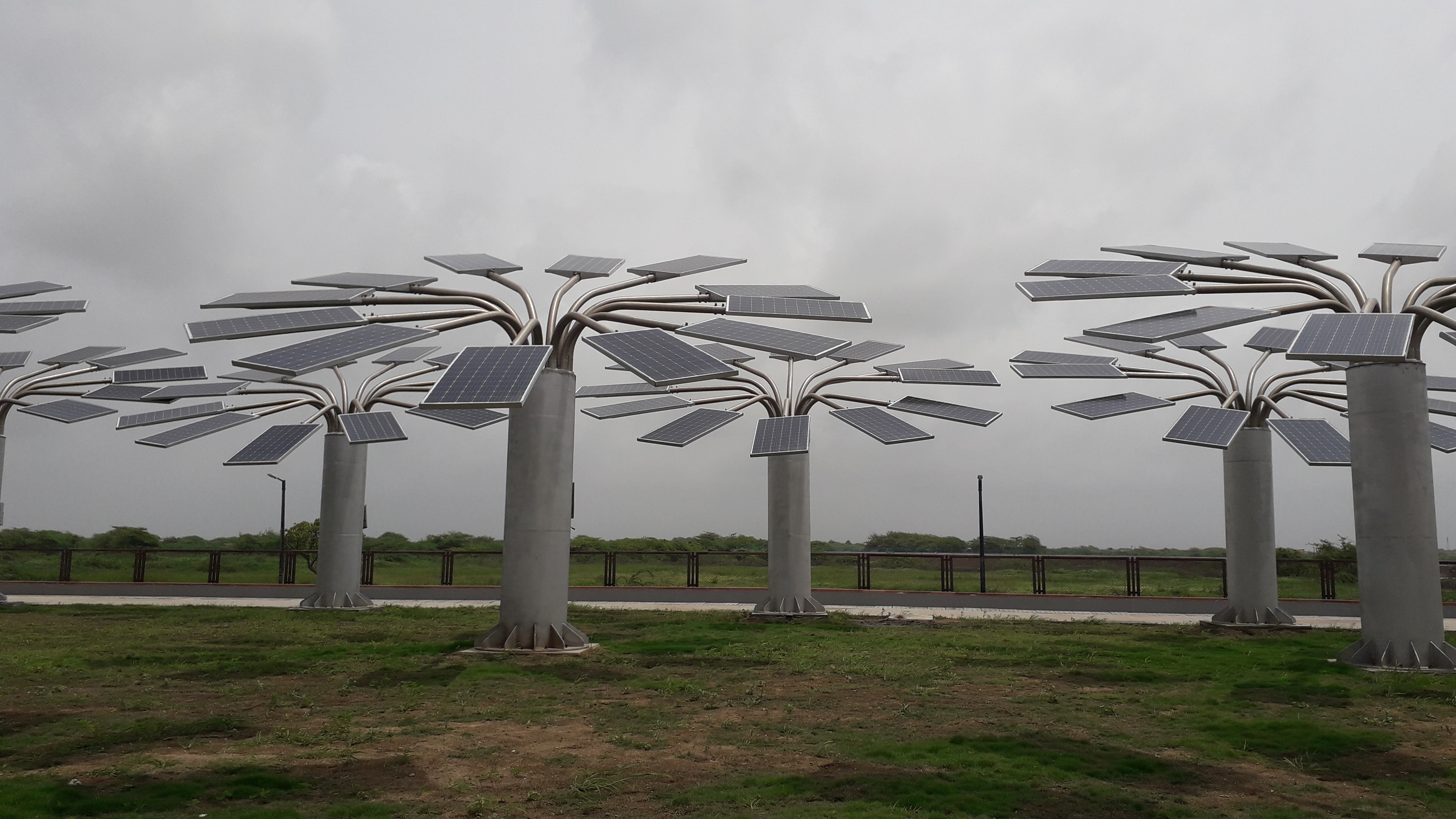
Solar panels in Flower shape

In order to reinstate the virtue of Self-sufficiency reinforced by Gandhi in the Freedom Struggle, the memorial is made self-sufficient for its energy needs. To achieve this 40 Solar Trees are installed. This makes this memorial a net zero-energy project. The energy produced during the day is exported to the electricity grid and during the night, the energy required is imported back from the grid. This system avoids need to install and maintain expensive batteries.

=== Solar salt-making pans ===
In order to engage the visitors, solar salt making pans are installed. As a memento of a visit to the memorial visitors are allowed to take a pinch of salt back home. The activity is aimed at celebrating the strategic brilliance of the Mahatma, who used the powerful metaphor of salt to lead towards independence.

=== Narrative murals ===
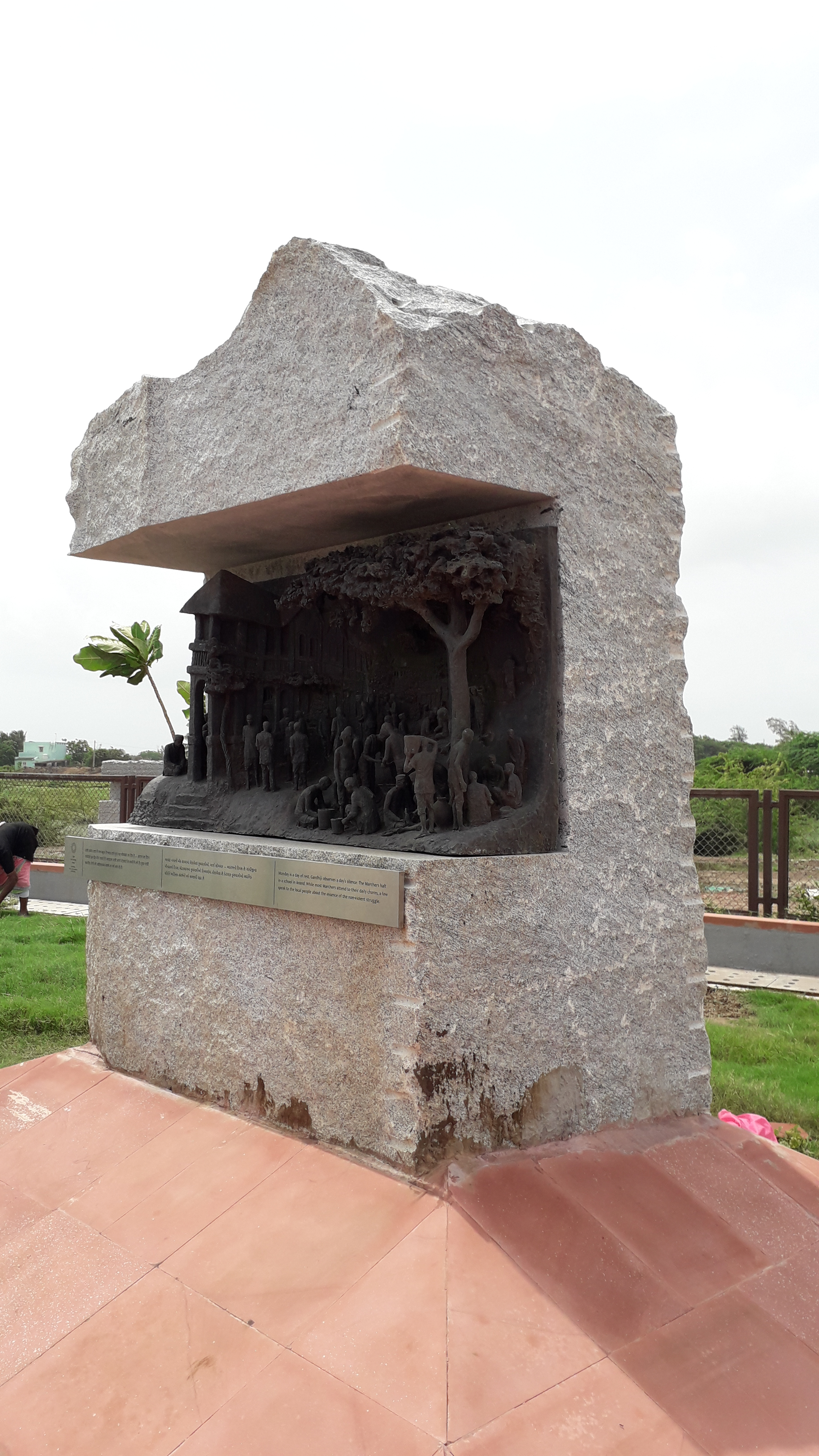
A narrative mural in fixed in stone relief

In all there are 24 narrative murals. The initial conceptualization for the murals was done at IIT Bombay and Clayfingers Pottery at Urakam, Kerala. After conceptualization at IIT Bombay and Clayfingers Pottery at Urakam, Kerala, the murals were cast in clay by Jawaharlal Nehru Architecture and Fine Arts University and later they were cast in bronze by studio Sukriti. The details of the Murals are as below:

Number	Image	Description
1		2 March 1930, Gandhi writes to the Viceroy, informing him of the proposed march to break the Salt Law. On 7 March 1930 Sardar Vallabhbhai Patel is arrested at Ras Village while preparing for and campaigning about the march.
2		12 March 1930, After early morning prayers, Kasturba applies Tilak to Gandhi as he sets out to Darma-yatra- Satyagraha.
		Gandhiji addresses a public meeting on the Sabarmati riverbed on the eve of the March. 2000 people attend the meeting.
3		River Crossing. A sea of people come to see the marchers off, while the crowd waits to welcome them on the other bank.
4		Gandhi addresses a village gathering along the way. He speaks on a range of issues, from salt tax to spinning the charkha and wearing Khadi, from picketing liquor shops to eradicating non-touchability.
5		The marchers receive a musical welcome in a village. The villagers listen to Gandhi's speech. They contribute to the march by donating money and a bullock cart.
6		Monday is the day of rest. Gandhi observes a day of silence. the marchers halt at a school in Anand. While most marchers attend to their daily chores, a few speak to local people about the essence of the non-violent struggle.
7		One of the marchers, Pandit Khare, leads the evening prayers. A 105-year-old woman gives her blessings, asking Gandhi to achieve the swaraj and return victorious soon.
8		The marchers reach Kareli late at night, after crossing Mahi River in boats and wading through marshes. Jawaharlal Nehru arrives later; he and Gandhi discuss action to be taken by All India Congress Committee.
9		At a village meeting, Gandhi is deeply pained to see the segregated seating arrangements for 'untouchables'. At his behest, the marchers move and sit amongst them.
10		As the march continues, the marchers are received warmly by villagers. People wait with eager anticipation to catch a glimpse of Gandhi. Some even climb treetops. Many join the march.
11		-
12		At day time halt, a barber gives Gandhi a shave while a cobbler mends his chappals. Members of the Muslim community meet Gandhi and assure him of their wholehearted participation in the struggle.
13		While crossing Narmada River in boat, Kasturba Gandhi joined him. Apart from them Abbas Taiyabji, Sarojini Naidu, Congress leaders of Bharuch and an American couple were also there.
14		In response to Gandhi's call as a part of non-cooperation movement Morarji Desai and other government officers submitted their resignation. Gandhi and Kasturba Gandhi met Kakasaheb Kalelkar at Trasla Village.
15		The Hindu and Muslim villagers of Kapletha Village lined up their bullock carts in a queue on Midhola River so that the marchers can cross the river easily.
16		-
17		A truck brings fruits and vegetables; laborers carry kits-lights for the marchers. This extravagance leads Gandhi to introspect and at Bhatgam he says marchers should also turn the searchlight inward.
18		The marchers cross the Tapi River on the Ashwinikumar railway bridge in Surat. People throng the bridge to give them a tumultuous welcome. They were also part of huge procession the next morning and received equally enthusiastic send-off.
19		Gandhi addresses a large crowd at Dudhia Talao, Navsari. An international film crew shoots the extraordinary scene, perched atop the flatbed of a vehicle. People purchased Khadi from a handcart.
20		24 days and 240 miles later, the march reaches Dandi on 5 April 1930. The marchers were welcomed at Saifee Villa by the owners. A prayer meeting is followed by a public address by Gandhi, who describes Dandi as having been chosen by God for the non-violent Salt Satyagraha.
21		6 April 1930, after a dip in the sea, Gandhi picks up a handful of salt and breaks the Salt Law, the other marchers do the same. And so begins the Salt Satyagraha, the civil disobedience movement that soon spreads across India.
22		Gandhi addresses a women's conference in Dandi on 13 April 1930. On 5 May 1930, a British magistrate accompanied by a platoon of armed policemen arrives at midnight to arrest Gandhi from his grass hut in Karadi-Matwad. He is then taken to Yerawada Central Jail.

=== Miscellaneous ===
On the wall of one of the structure Gandhi's quote dated 5 April 1930 which was written at Dandi, is superscribed in his handwriting which reads:

I want world sympathy in this battle of Right against Might.

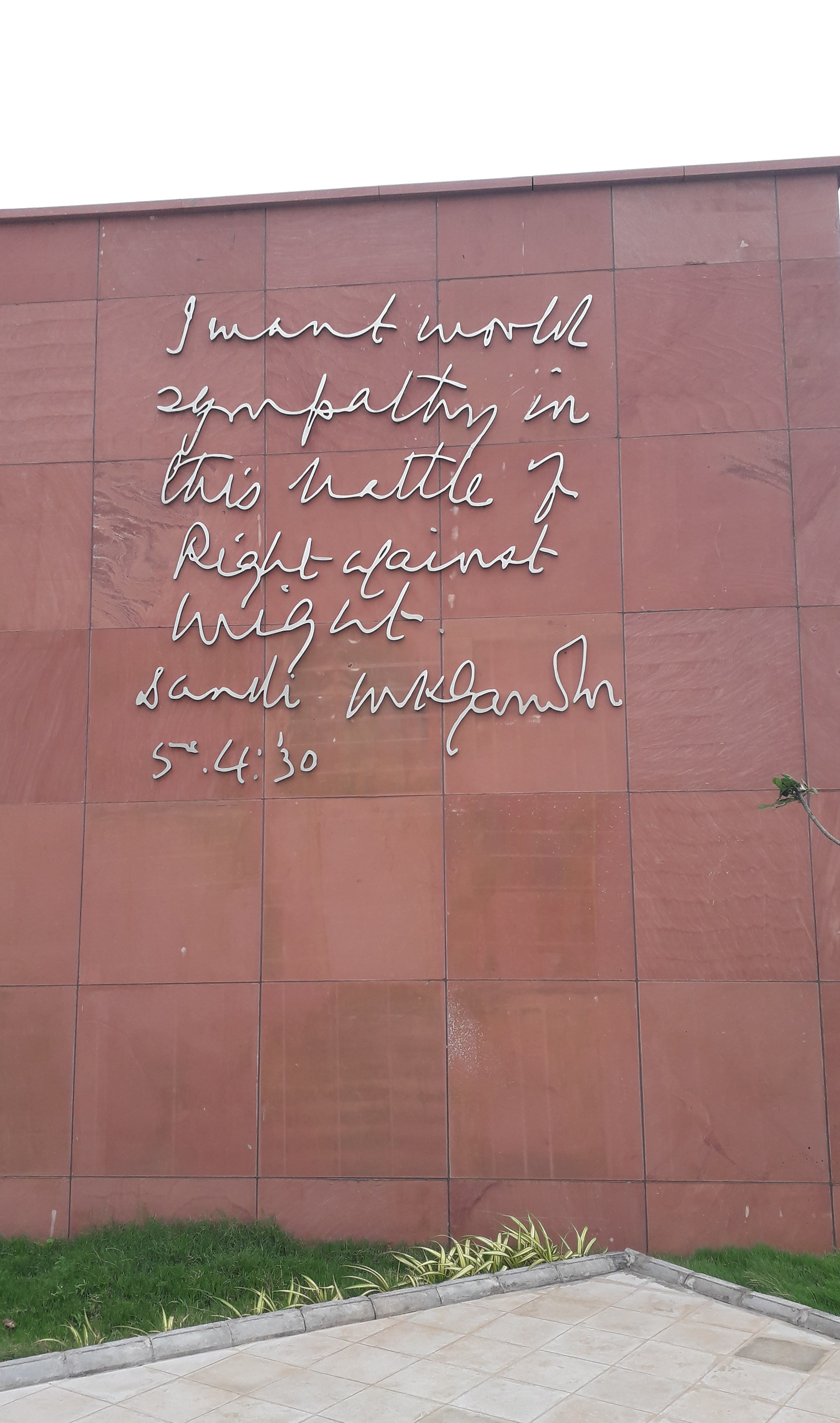
Gandhi's quote on the wall

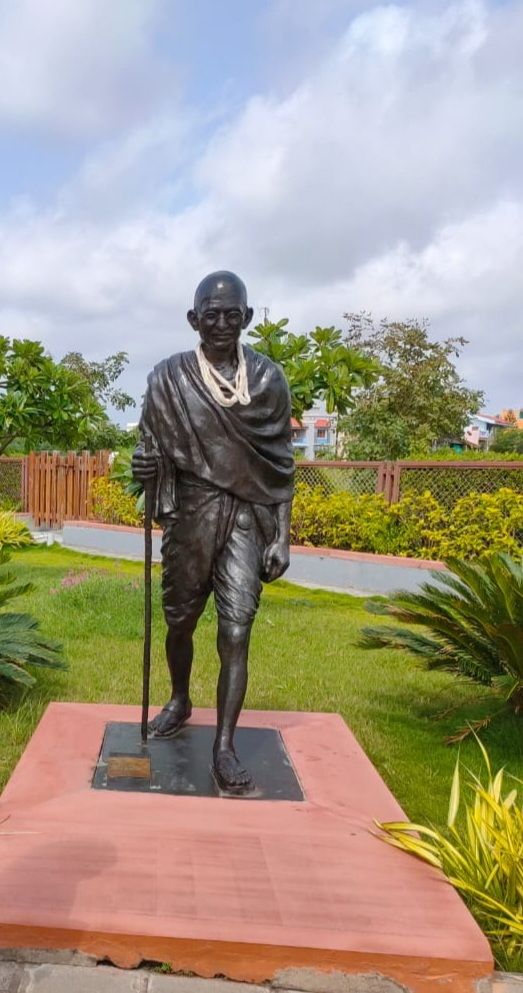
Statue of Gandhiji at the entrance of Dandi Smarak

== Adjacent memorials ==
=== Saifee Villa and Prarthana Mandir ===
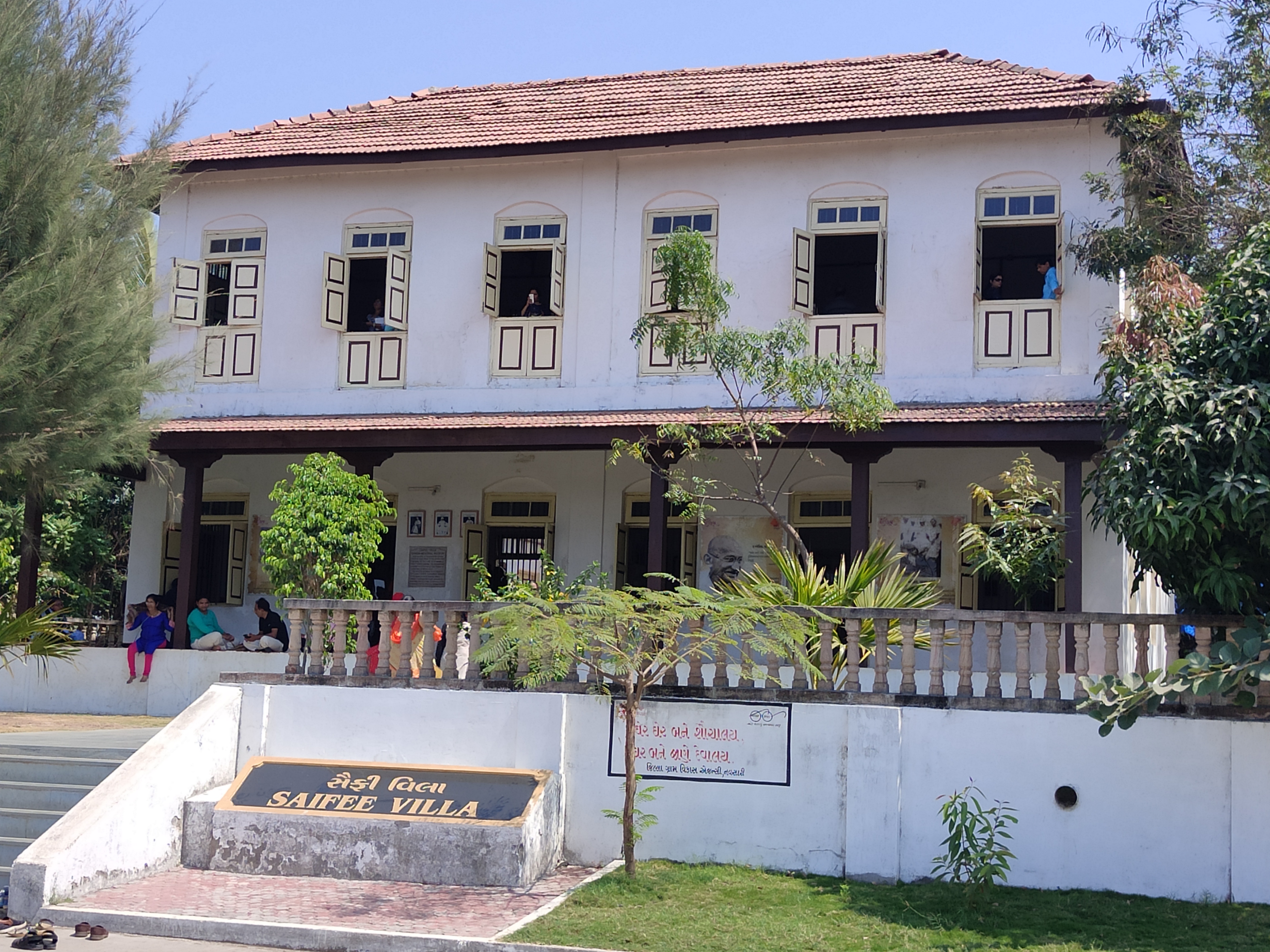
Saifee Villa

During the march, Gandhi had spent a night of 5 April 1930 at Saifee Villa. It was owned by Syedna Taher Saifuddin, 51st religious head of the Dawoodi Bohra community. In 1961, he requested Prime Minister Jawaharlal Nehru to dedicate this villa to the nation as part of the national heritage.

Since 1964, the villa has been maintained by the Government of Gujarat. The local district administration gets a grant of ₹50,000 (US$520) per month from the Gujarat tourism department to maintain it. In 2016, the Vadodara Circle of Archaeological Survey of India partially restored the Saifee Villa and Prarthana Mandir.

== Gallery ==
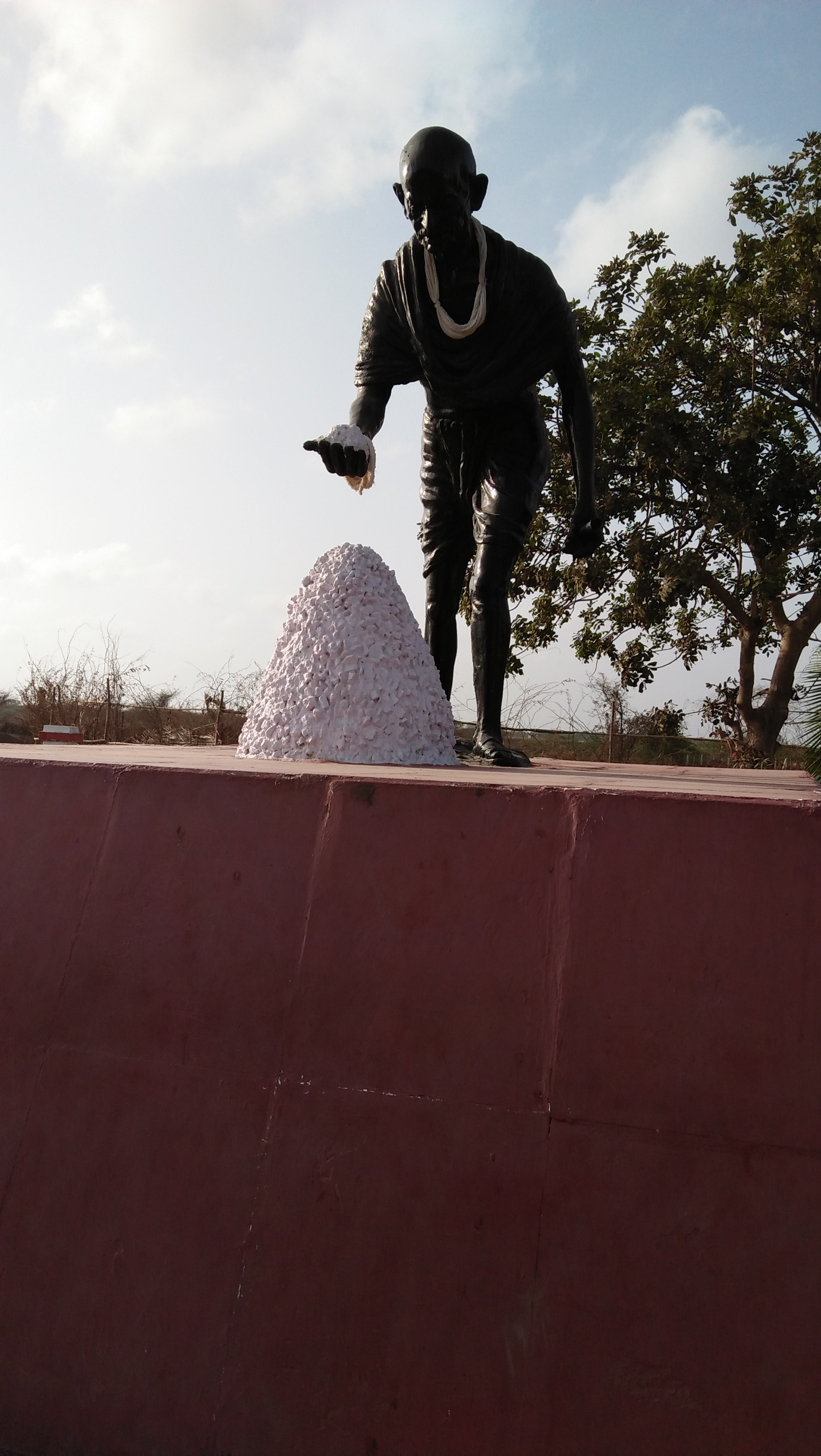
Gandhi statue at Dandi Salt Memorial

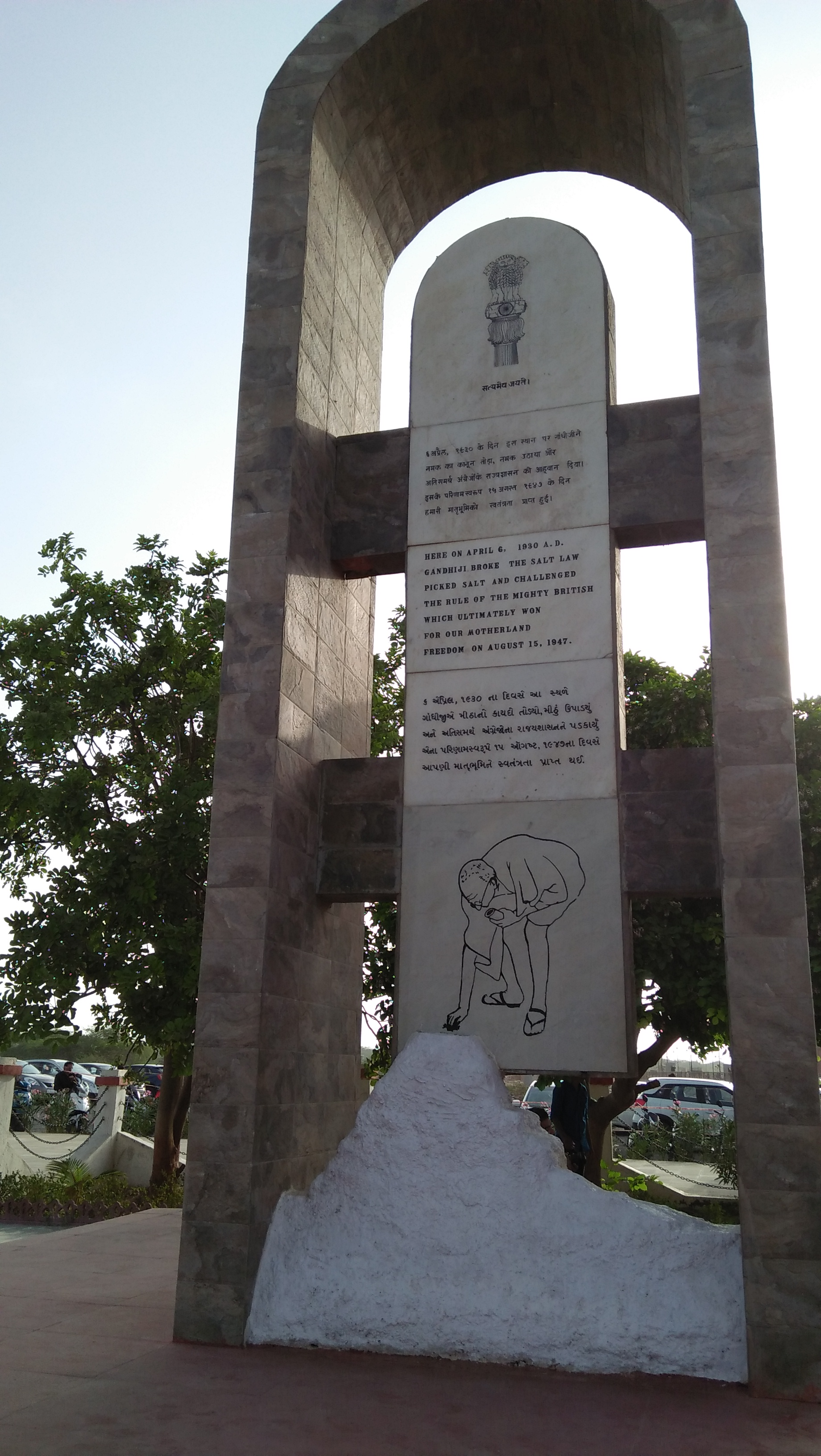
Salt Memorial

== See also ==
- Salt March
