= Dandi, Navsari =

- Village
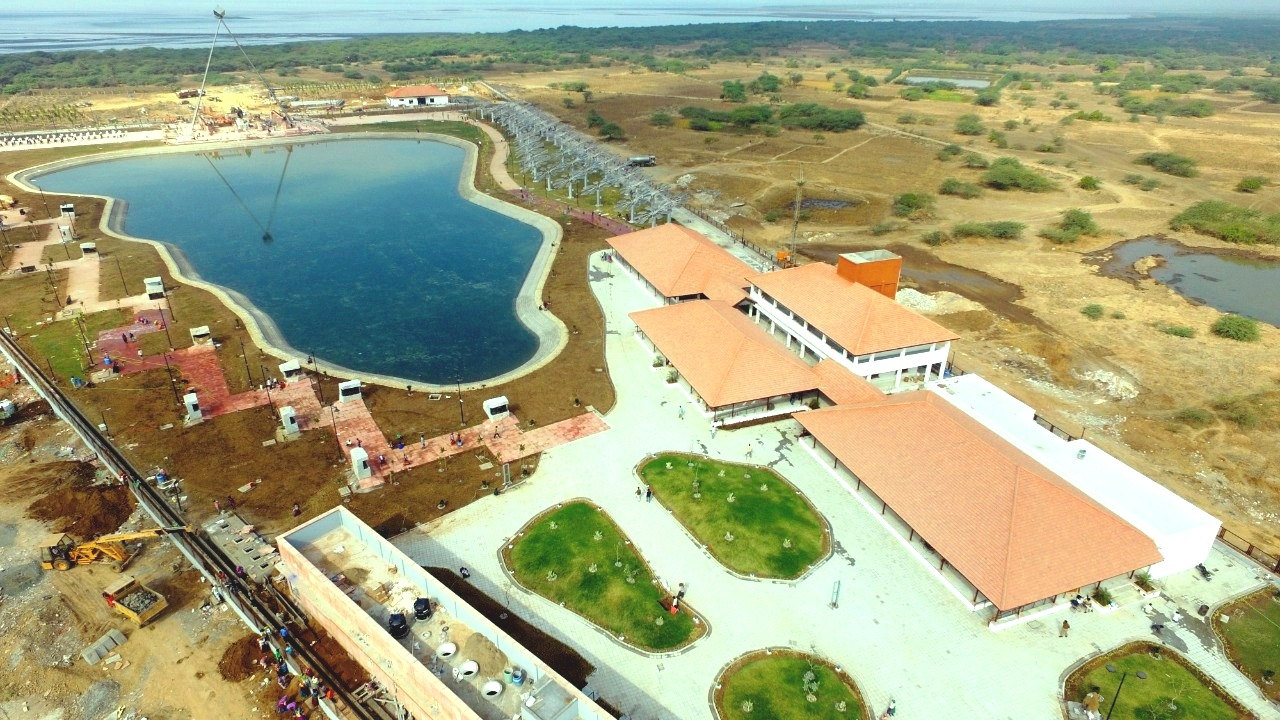
- National Salt Satyagraha Memorial
- Nickname: Danda
- Location in Gujarat, India Dandi, Navsari (India)
- Coordinates: 20°53′11.3″N 72°48′03.4″E
- Country: India
- State: Gujarat
- District: Navsari

Languages
  - Official: Gujarati, Hindi
- Time zone: UTC+5:30 (IST)
- Vehicle registration: GJ 21
- Website: gujaratindia.com

Dandi is a village in the Jalalpore taluka, Navsari District, Gujarat, India. It is located on the coast of the Arabian Sea near the city of Navsari.

The village got into worldwide prominence in 1930, when Mahatma Gandhi selected it to be the destination for the Salt March. He marched from Sabarmati (Ahmedabad) to Dandi (Navsari) with some of his followers to protest against the imposition of a tax on salt by the British Raj. Thousands of people participated, travelling on foot for 24 days from Ahmedabad to Dandi.

The Government of India initiated plans to develop the Sabarmati-Dandi stretch as a tourist hub. In 2019 the National Salt Satyagraha Memorial to commemorate the Salt March of the Indian Independence Movement was opened in the village.

== See also ==
- Indian independence movement
- History of the salt tax in British India
- Salt March
- Mahatma Gandhi
