= Goa Sampark Kranti Express =

Train in India

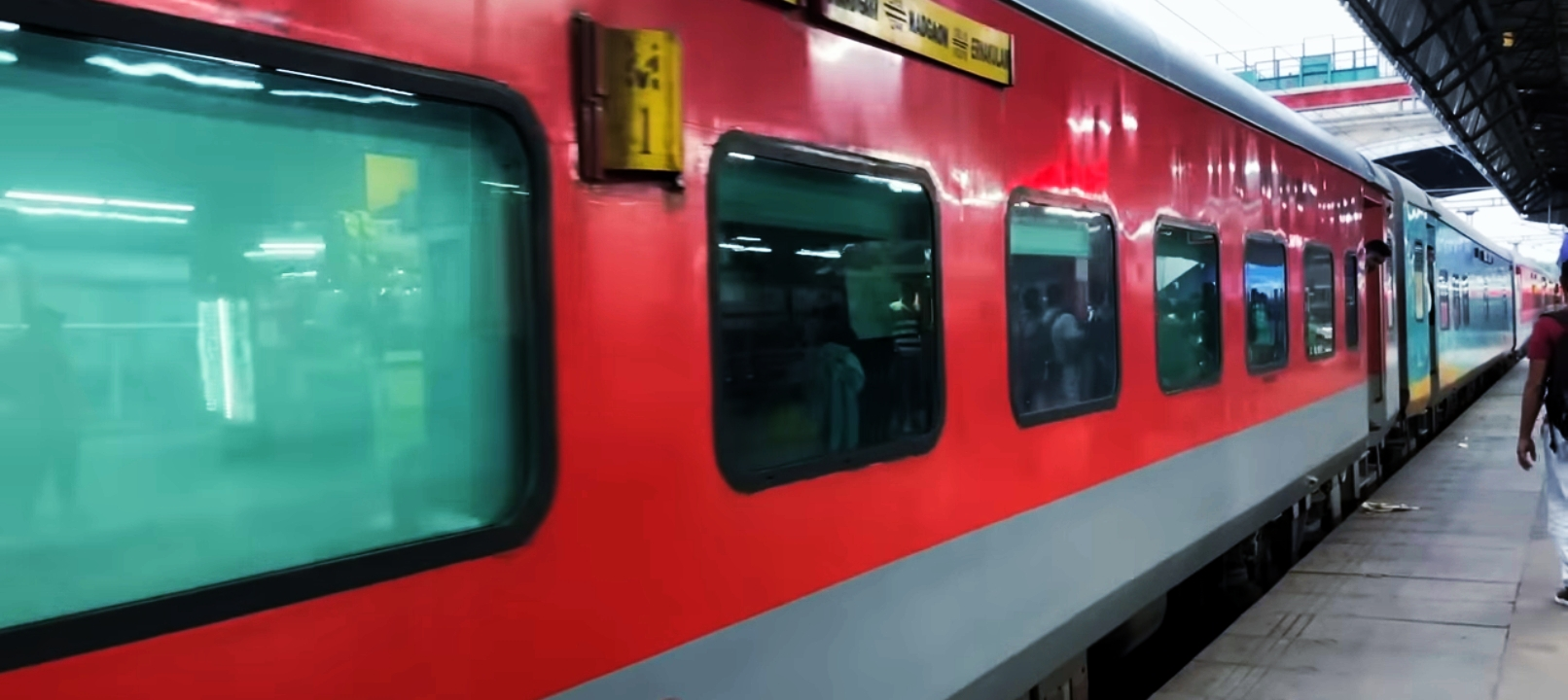
- Goa Sampark Kranti Express At Mathura Junction railway station

Overview
- Service type: Sampark Kranti Express
- Locale: Goa, Maharashtra, Gujarat, Madhya Pradesh, Rajasthan, Uttar Pradesh, Haryana, Delhi & Chandigarh
- First service: 23 November 2004; 21 years ago
- Current operator: Northern Railways

Route
- Termini: Chandigarh (CDG); Madgaon (MAO)
- Stops: 9
- Distance travelled: 2,163 km (1,344 mi)
- Average journey time: 36 hours 40 minutes
- Service frequency: Bi-weekly
- Train number: 12449 / 12450

On-board services
- Classes: AC 1 Tier; AC 2 Tier; AC 3 Tier; Sleeper class; General class
- Seating arrangements: Yes
- Sleeping arrangements: Yes
- Catering facilities: Available
- Observation facilities: Large windows

Technical
- Rolling stock: LHB coach
- Track gauge: 1,676 mm (5 ft 6 in)
- Operating speed: 65 km/h (40 mph)
Route map
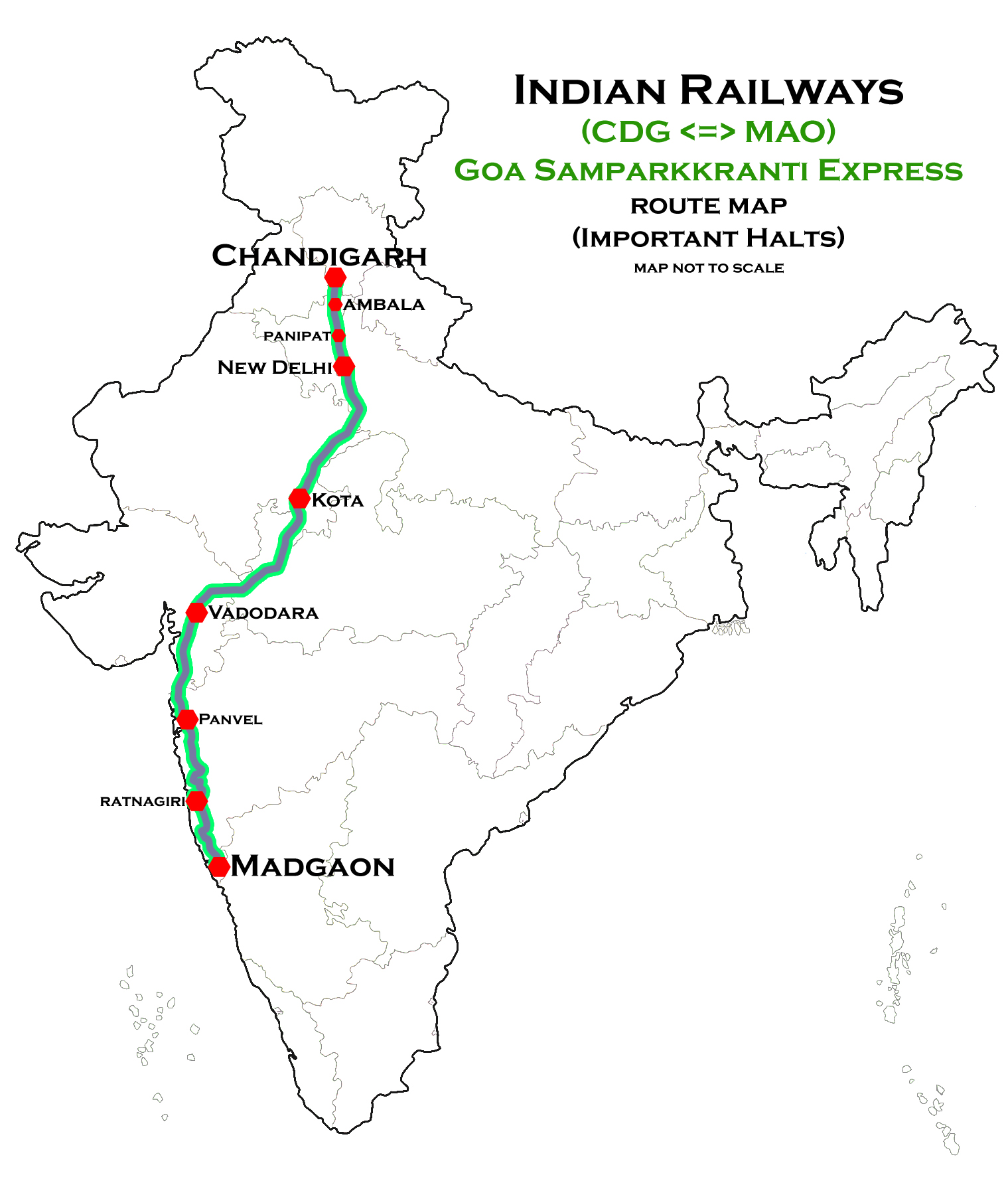
- Goa Samparkkranti Express (CDG–MAO) route map

The 12449 / 12450 Goa Sampark Kranti Express is one of the most important trains among the Sampark Kranti Express trains series operated on Indian Railways by the Northern Railway Delhi Division between Hazrat Nizamuddin and Madgaon Junction, a town in the Indian state of Goa The train is extended to Chandigarh similar to Kerala Sampark Kranti recently.

As of 2015, this train is running on a bi-weekly basis and holds Superfast status.

== Train details ==
- 12449DN Madgaon–Chandigarh via New Delhi and Hazrat Nizamuddin Goa Sampark Kranti Express
- 12450UP Chandigarh–Madgaon Goa Sampark Kranti Express

In 2008 Indian Railway Budget, the train announced to run bi-weekly as the frequency increased from weekly to bi-weekly.

== Alternative trains for Madgaon or Goa from national capital ==
1. 12779/12780 Vasco-Da-Gama H.Nizamuddin Goa Express – daily via, Madgaon, Belgaum, Miraj, Bhusawal, Bhopal
2. 12617/12618 Mangala Lakshadweep Express – via Konkan Railways, Panvel, Bhusawal, Bhopal
3. 12431/12432 Trivandrum–H.Nizamuddin Thiruvananthapuram Rajdhani Express via, Vadodara, Konkan Railway
4. 22413/22414 Madgaon–H.Nizamuddin Madgaon Rajdhani Express via Vadodara, Konkan Railway
5. 12217/12218 Kochuveli–Chandigarh Kerala Sampark Kranti Express via Vadodara, Konkan Railway
6. 12483/12484 Kochuveli–Amritsar Weekly Express via Vadodara, Konkan Railway
7. 22659/22660 Kochuveli–Yog Nagari Rishikesh Superfast Express via Vadodara, Konkan Railway
8. 22633/22634 Thiruvananthapuram–Hazrat Nizamuddin Express via Vadodara, Konkan Railway
9. 12283/12284 Ernakulam–H.Nizamuddin Duronto Express via Vadodara, Konkan Railway
10. 22653/22654 Thiruvananthapuram–Hazrat Nizamuddin Express (via Kottayam), Vadodara, Konkan Railway
11. 22655/22656 Ernakulam–Hazrat Nizamuddin Express, Vadodara, Konkan Railway

== Traction ==
Earlier, a Sabarmati-based WDP-4D would haul this train between Madgaon and Vadodara Junction, and a Vadodara-based WAP-7 (HOG)-equipped locomotive for its journey between Vadodara and Chandigarh.

Now that the electrification of Konkan Railways has been completed, since 17/10/2022 a Ludhiana based WAP-7 loco hauls this train for the entire journey.

== Route and halts ==
This train halts at the following stations

1. Chandigarh
2. Ambala Cantt Junction
3. Panipat Junction
4. New Delhi
5. Hazrat Nizamuddin
6. Kota Junction
7. Ratlam Junction
8. Vadodara Junction
9. Surat
10. Vasai Road
11. Panvel
12. Ratnagiri
13. Pernem
14. Thivim
15. Karmali
16. Madgaon

== See also ==
- Goa Express
- Trains of SWR
- Konkan Railways
- Andhra Pradesh Sampark Kranti Express
- Madhya Pradesh Sampark Kranti
