= Dahanu Road railway station =

Railway station in Maharashtra, India

Dahanu Road

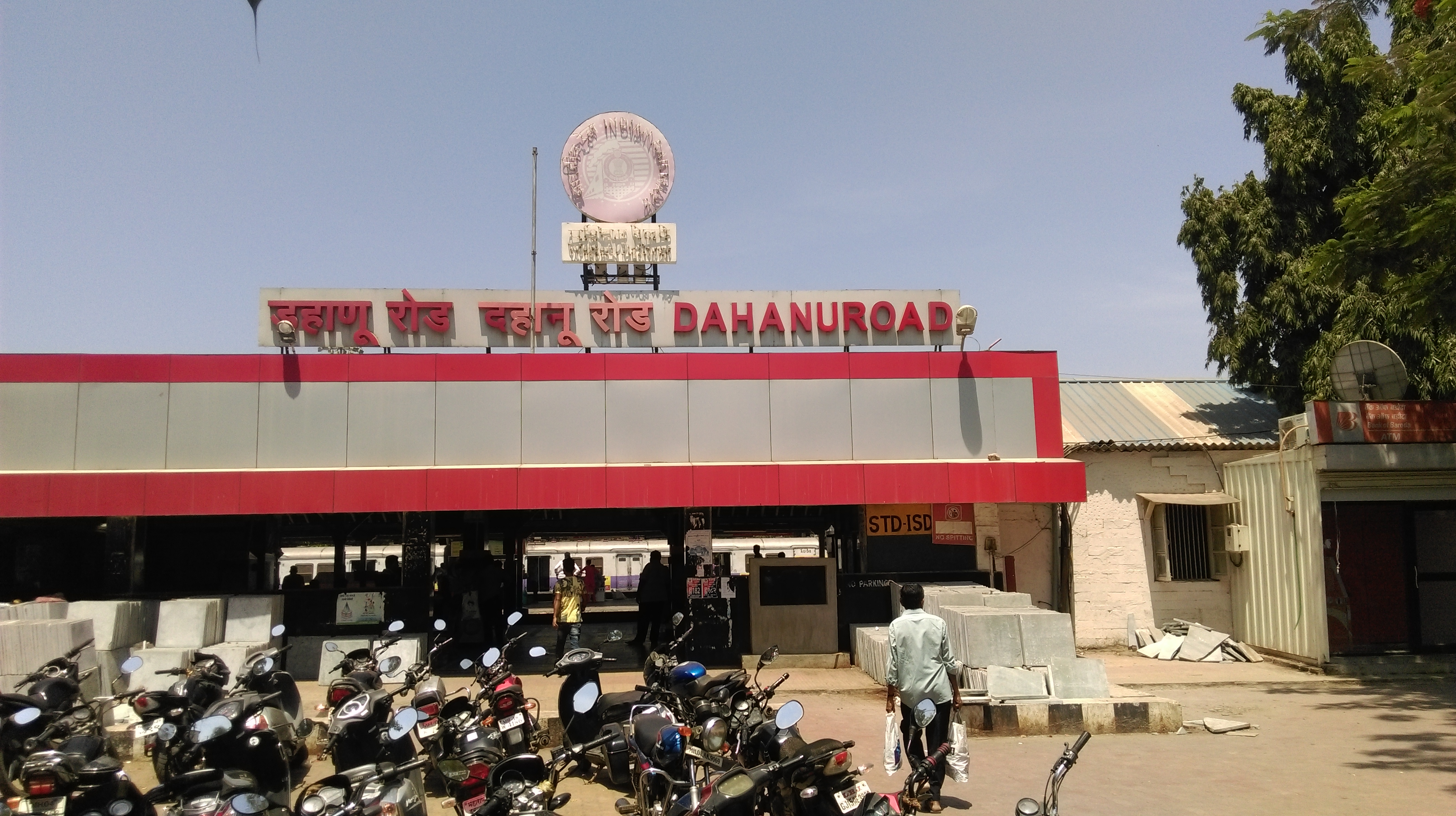

General information
- Location: Dahanu, Palghar district
- Coordinates: 19°59′29.5″N 72°44′36.8″E
- Elevation: 9.820 metres (32.22 ft)
- System: Mumbai Suburban Railway station
- Owner: Ministry of Railways, Indian Railways
- Line: Western line
- Platforms: 5
- Tracks: 6

Construction
- Structure type: Standard on-ground station

Other information
- Status: Active
- Station code: DRD
- Fare zone: Western Railways

Services
Preceding station	Mumbai Suburban Railway	Following station
Vangaon towards Churchgate	Western line	Gholvad towards Dahanu Road
Route map
Location
- Location within India Location within Maharashtra

Dahanu Road is a railway station near the town of Dahanu in Palghar district of Maharashtra. It lies on the Western line of the Mumbai Suburban Railway network. It is the northern limit of the Suburban network, although the track continues north to Gholwad and beyond.

== History ==
A table listing the elevations of stations and major bridges along the line was published in the journal The Bombay Builder on 5 April 1867, which mentions a station around 13 km from Boisur (Boisar) by the name of Dhanoo Road (referring to this station) along the line. This suggests that the station was opened sometime around that year.

The railway was extended as a double track from Palghar to Dahanu Road on 17 January 1898, and continued as a single track up to Gholvad on 18 October 1900.

In 2002, Western Railway announced that it would extend the EMU service from Virar up to Dahanu Road. On 16 April 2013, Western Railway Started Services For Dahanu Road to Churchgate Using EMU Trains. In January 2012, the Vasai and Virar Municipal Corporation started litigation to force the railway to run direct services from Mumbai Churchgate to Dahanu Road, rather than making passengers change at Virar, as at present. The railway replied that they did not have enough trains for through services, and the tracks north of Virar were already too busy. In March 2012, Railway Minister Dinesh Trivedi announced additional services on the Virar-Dahanu Road railway.

== Gallery ==
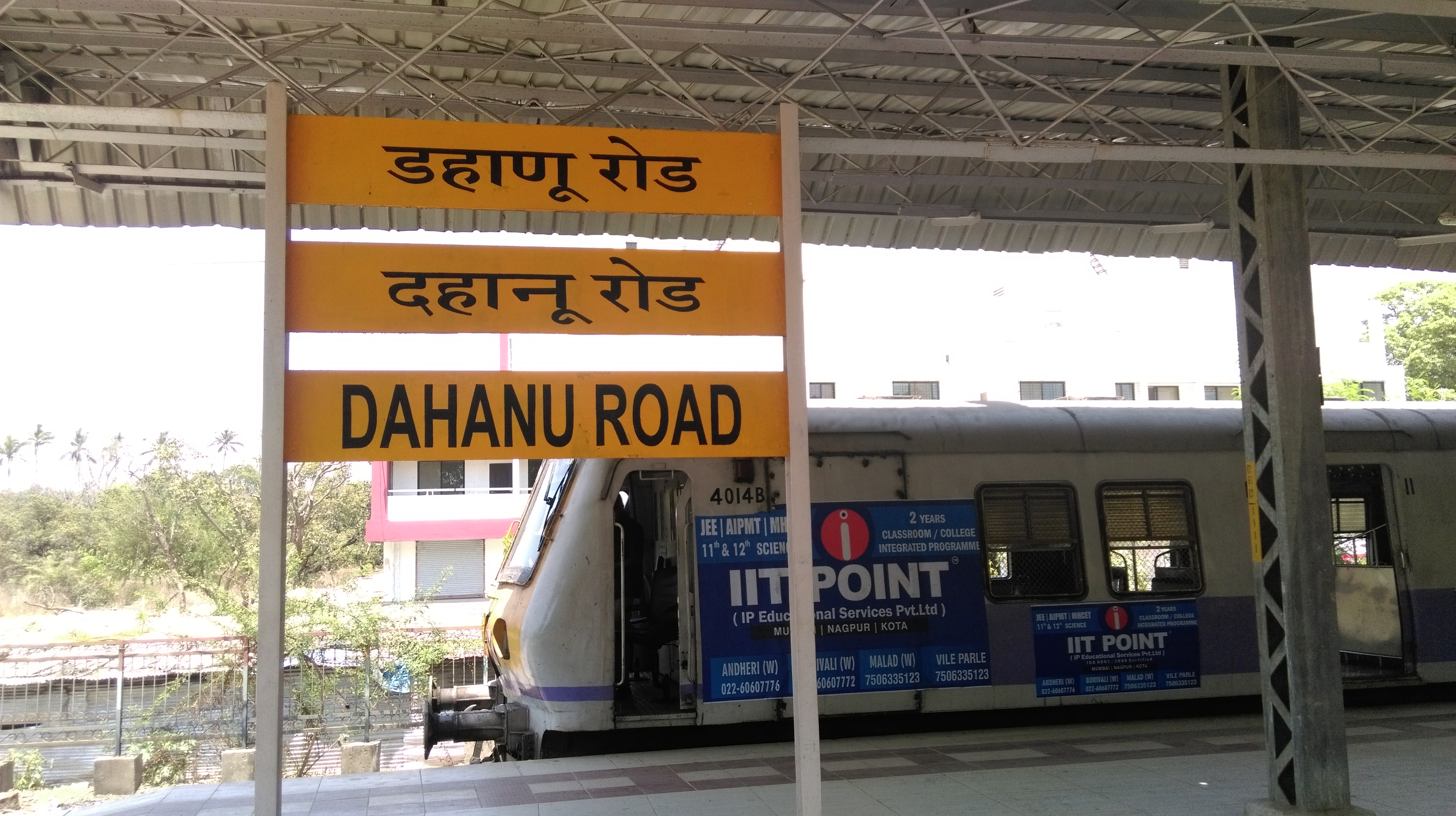
Dahanu Road railway station – Mumbai EMU local train

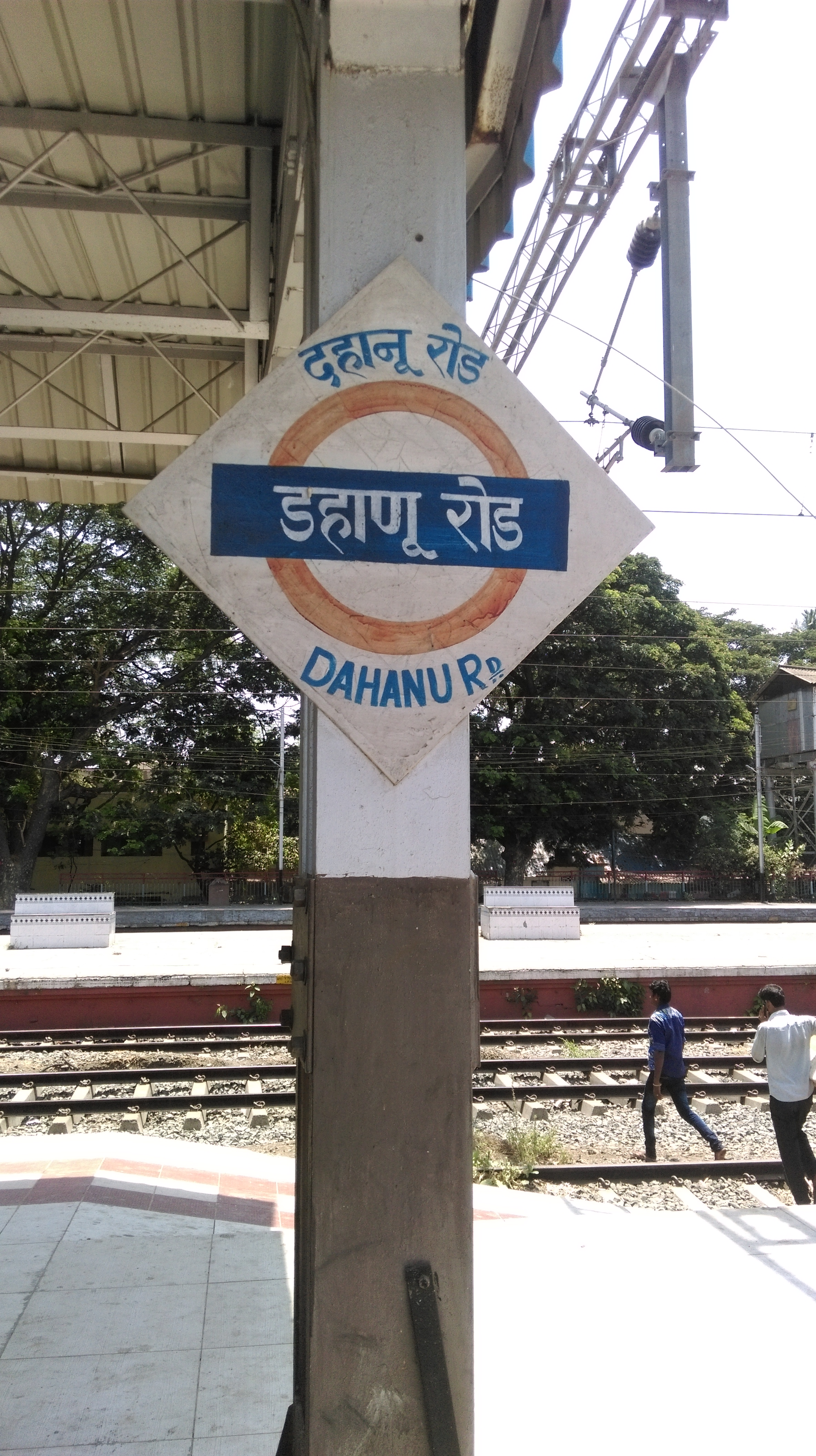
Dahanu Road railway station – platform board

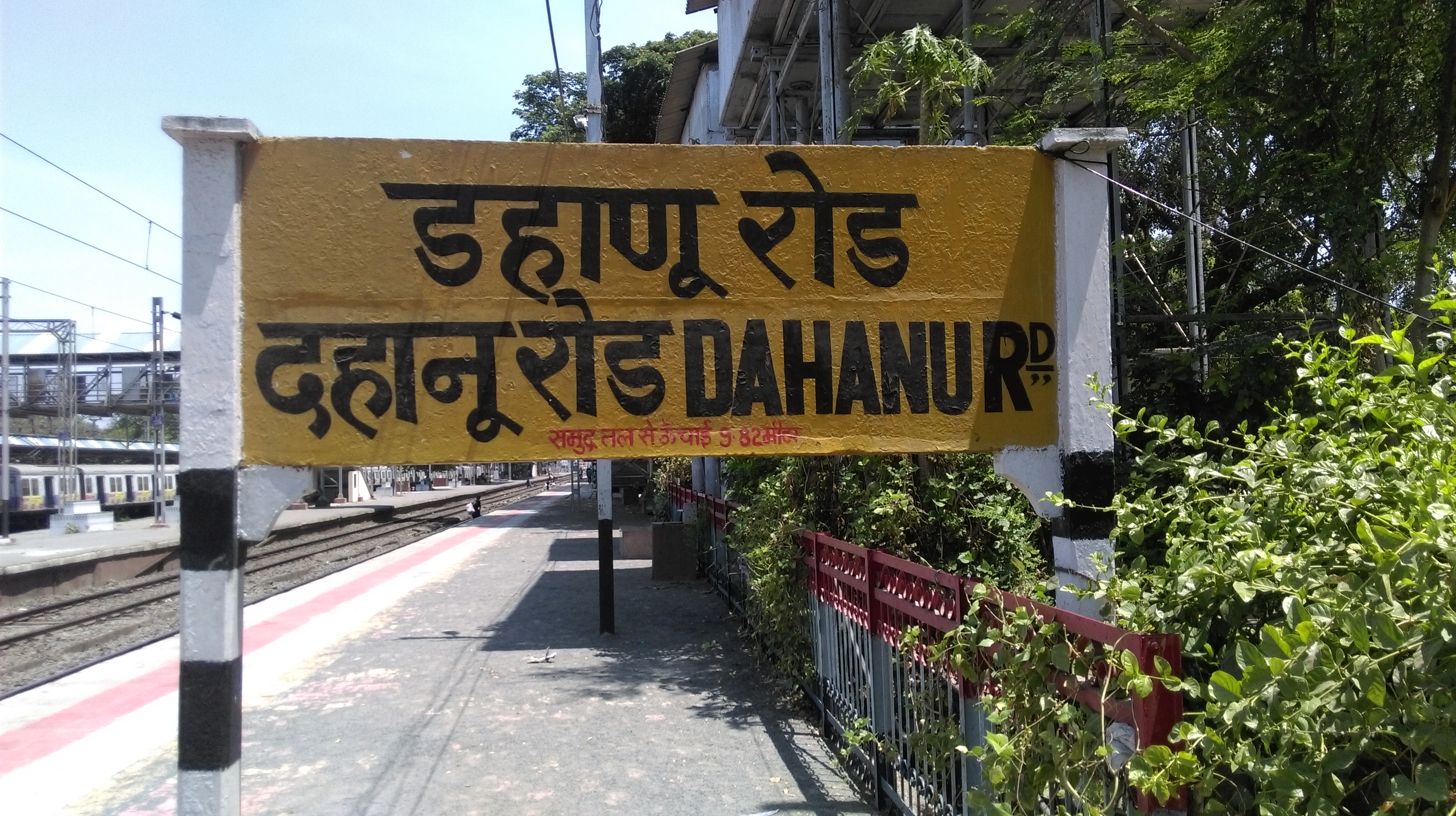
Dahanu Road railway station – station board

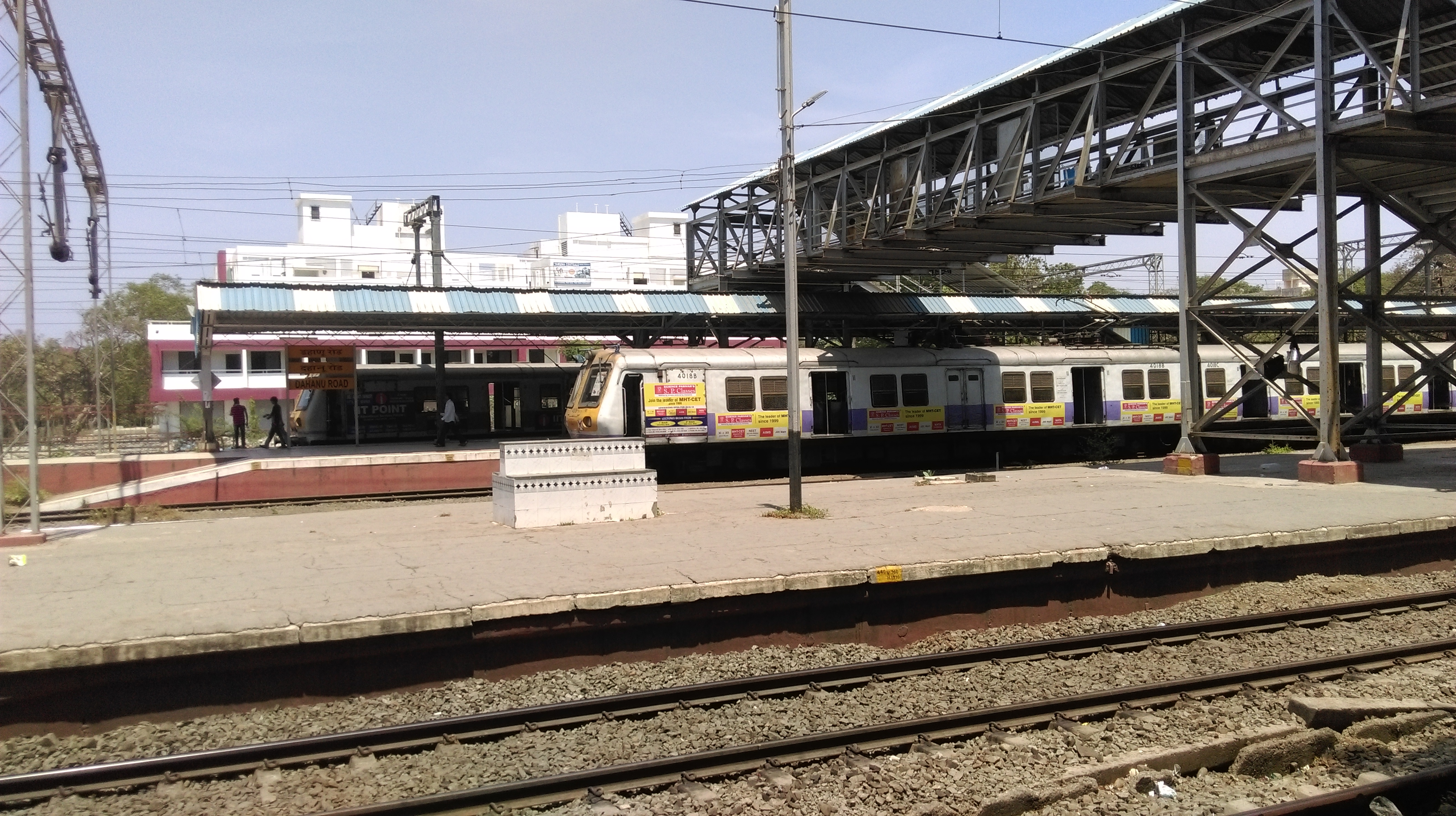
View of the railway station from Platform 1

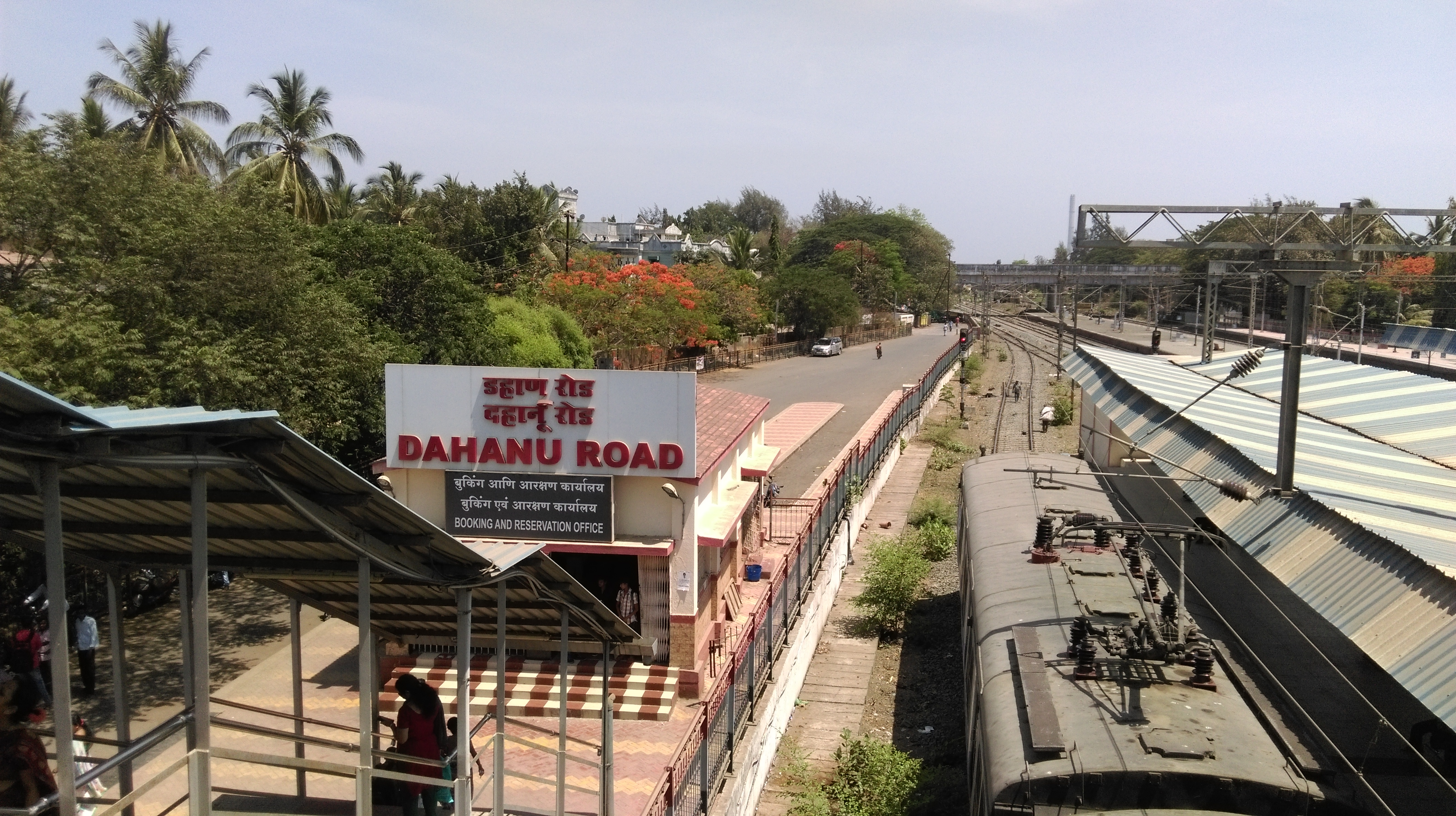
Dahanu Road railway station – Overview

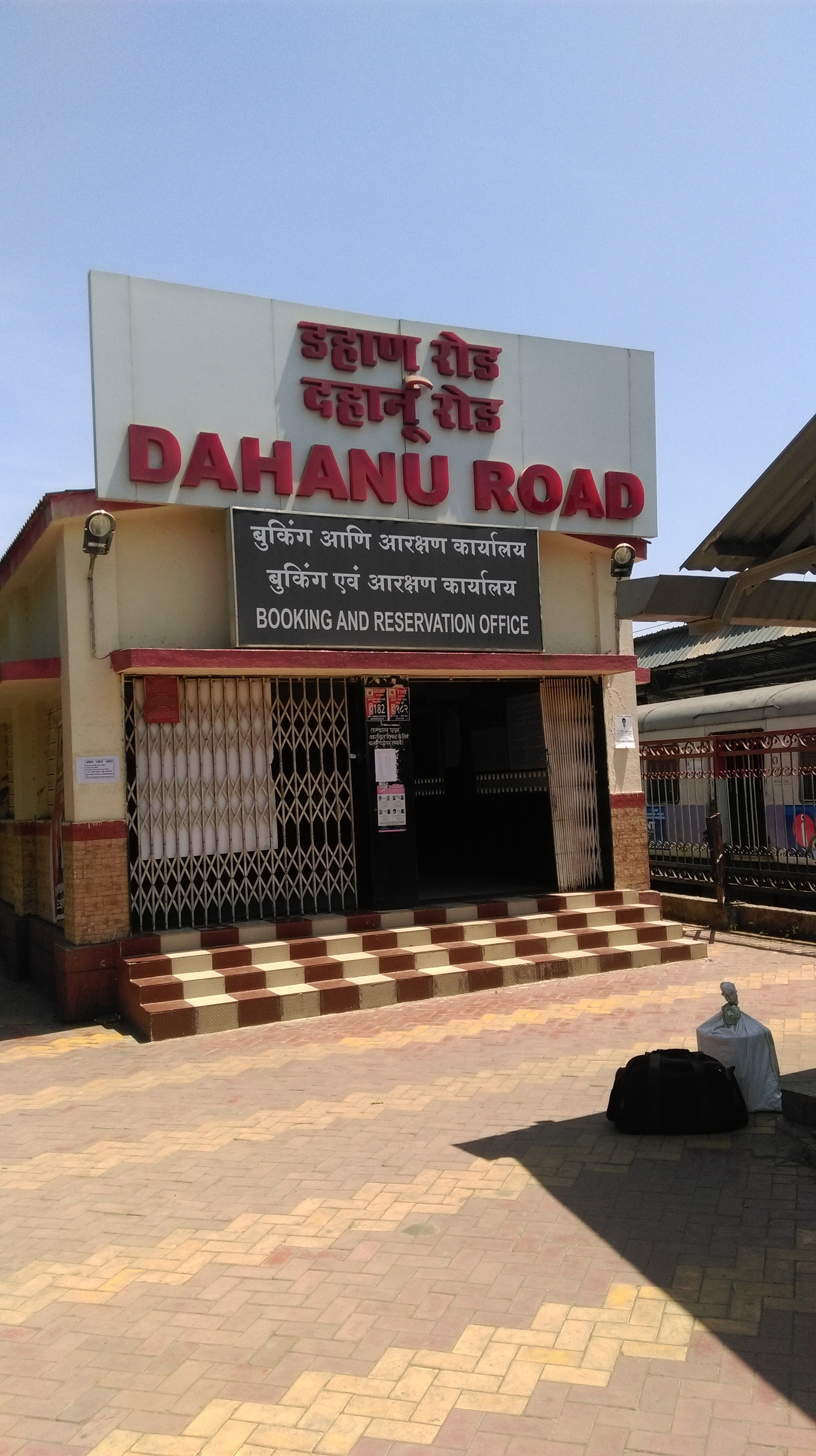
The station's reservation office

== Major trains ==
The following trains stop at Dahanu Road railway station:

- Bandra Terminus–Dehradun Express
- Saurashtra Express
- Firozpur Janata Express
- Lok Shakti Express
- Gujarat Mail
- Flying Ranee
- Gujarat Superfast Express
- Ahimsa Express
- Bhagat Ki Kothi–Pune Express
- Veraval–Pune Express
- Amrapur Aravali Express
- Thiruvananthapuram–Hazrat Nizamuddin Express (via Alappuzha)
- Thiruvananthapuram–Hazrat Nizamuddin Express (via Kottayam)
- Sayajinagari Express
- Paschim Express
