= Hazrat Nizamuddin railway station =

Railway station in Delhi, India

Hazrat Nizamuddin Junction
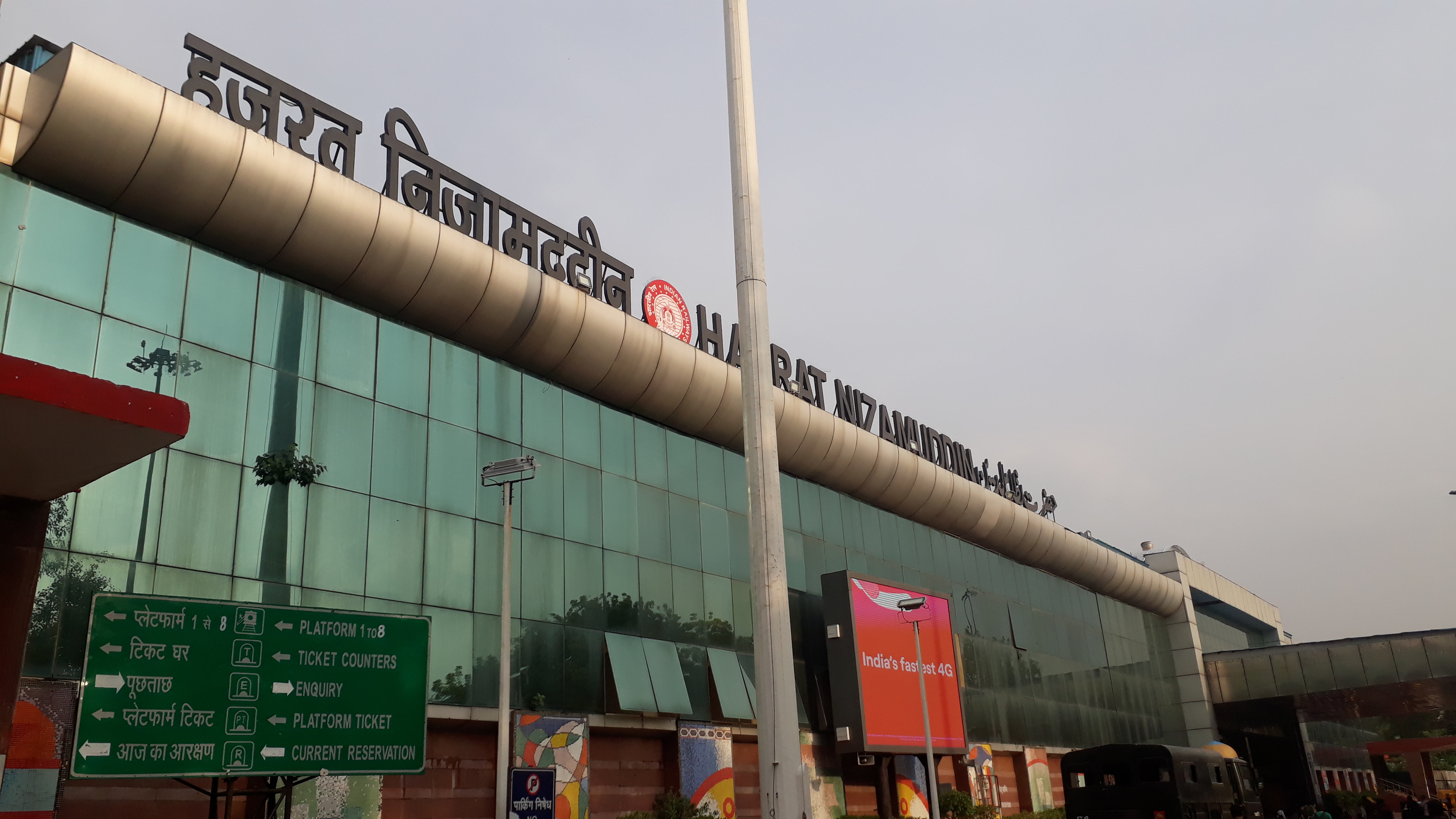

General information
- Location: Station Road, near Nizamuddin East and Sarai Kale Khan, New Delhi, Delhi 110013; India
- Coordinates: 28°35′21″N 77°15′15″E
- Elevation: 206.7 metres (678 ft)
- System: Indian Railways and Delhi Suburban Railway station
- Owner: Ministry of Railways (India)
- Operator: Indian Railways
- Platforms: 9
- Tracks: 13
- Connections: Pink Line Sarai Kale Khan Nizamuddin; Sarai Kale Khan; Sarai Kale Khan ISBT

Construction
- Structure type: At grade
- Parking: Yes
- Accessible: Available

Other information
- Station code: NZM
- Zone(s): Northern Railway
- Division(s): Delhi

History
- Opened: 1926

Passengers
- Daily: 360,000+
Route map
Location
- Location within India
- Interactive map

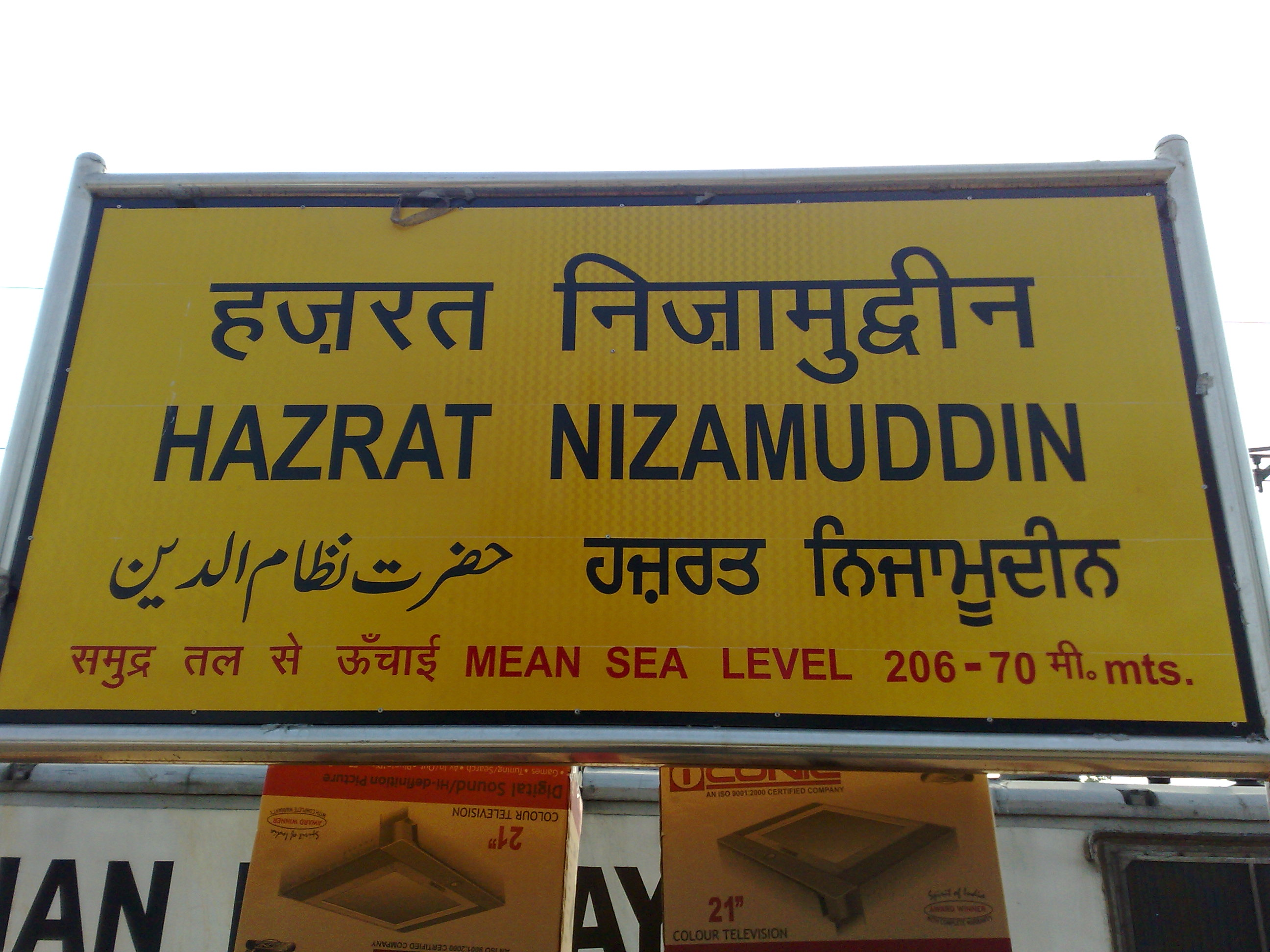
Station signage

Hazrat Nizamuddin Junction railway station (station code: NZM) is part of the Indian Railways network New Delhi, though part of South East Delhi Delhi, Delhi, India. It is operated by the Delhi division of the Northern Railway. Serving as one of the five primary railway stations in the Union Territory of Delhi, it handles nearly 250 trains daily. Christened after the medieval Sufi saint Nizamuddin Auliya, the station was revamped to alleviate congestion at the New Delhi railway station. As part of the Sarai Kale Khan multi-model transport hub located on the Inner Ring Road, the Hazrat Nizamuddin railway station facilitates the transfer between the Sarai Kale Khan ISBT, Sarai Kale Khan Nizamuddin metro station of Delhi Metro's Pink Line, Sarai Kale Khan RRTS Interchange for the Delhi NCR's regional semi-highspeed rail, and the Sarai Kale Khan HSR interchange on the Delhi–Kolkata high-speed rail corridor and Delhi–Ahmedabad high-speed rail corridor.

== Major trains ==
The train which originates/stops from/at Hazrat Nizamuddin are :

- Hazrat Nizamuddin–Khajuraho Vande Bharat Express (22469/22470)
- Rani Kamalapati–Hazrat Nizamuddin Vande Bharat Express (20171/20172)
- Gatiman Express (12049/12050)
- Hazrat Nizamuddin–Pune Duronto Express (12263/12264)
- Chennai–Hazrat Nizamuddin Duronto Express (12269/12270)
- Ernakulam–H.Nizamuddin Duronto Express (12283/12284)
- Secunderabad–Hazrat Nizamuddin Duronto Express (12286/12287)
- Mumbai Central–New Delhi Duronto Express (22209/22210)
- August Kranti Rajdhani Express (12953/12954)
- Hazrat Nizamuddin–Thiruvananthapuram Rajdhani Express (12431/12432)
- Chennai Rajdhani Express (12433/12434)
- Secunderabad–Hazrat Nizamuddin Rajdhani Express (12437/12438)
- Bangalore Rajdhani Express (22691/22692)
- Mumbai CSMT–Hazrat Nizamuddin Rajdhani Express (22221/22222)
- Madgaon–Hazrat Nizamuddin Rajdhani Express (22413/22414)
- Nanda Devi AC Superfast Express (12401/12402)
- Lokmanya Tilak Terminus AC Superfast Express (12171/12172)
- Durg–Hazrat Nizamuddin Humsafar Express (22867/22868)
- Karnataka Sampark Kranti Express (via Ballari) (12649/12650)
- Tamil Nadu Sampark Kranti Express (12651/12652)
- Andhra Pradesh Sampark Kranti Express (12707/12708)
- Maharashtra Sampark Kranti Express (12907/12908)
- Ekta Nagar Gujarat Sampark Kranti Express (20945/20946)
- Gujarat Sampark Kranti Express (12917/12918)
- Karnataka Sampark Kranti Express (via Belagavi) (12629/12630)
- Chhattisgarh Sampark Kranti Superfast Express (12823/12824)
- Marathwada Sampark Kranti Express (12753/12754)
- Madhya Pradesh Sampark Kranti Express (12121/12122)
- Uttar Pradesh Sampark Kranti Express (12447/12448)
- Kota–Hazrat Nizamuddin Jan Shatabdi Express (12059/12060)
- Visakhapatnam Swarna Jayanti Express (12804/12805)
- Mysore Swarna Jayanti Express (12781/12782)
- Thiruvananthapuram Swarna Jayanti Express (12643/12644)
- CSMT Kolhapur–Hazrat Nizamuddin Superfast Express (12147/12148)
- Shaan-e-Bhopal Express (12155/12156)
- Mahakoshal Express (12189/12190)
- Jabalpur–H.Nizamuddin Express (12191/12192)
- Bandra Terminus–Hazrat Nizamuddin Yuva Express (12247/12248)
- Bhusaval–Hazrat Nizamuddin Gondwana Express (12405/12406)
- Raigarh–Hazrat Nizamuddin Gondwana Express (12410/12411)
- Miraj Junction–Hazrat Nizamuddin Darshan Superfast Express (12493/12494)
- Chennai Central–Hazrat Nizamuddin Garib Rath Express (12611/12612)
- Mangala Lakshadweep Express (12617/12618)
- Thirukkural Express (12641/12642)
- Millennium Superfast Express (12645/12646)
- Kongu Express (12647/12648)
- Dakshin Express (12721/12722)
- Goa Express (12779/12780)
- Samata Express (12807/12808)
- Bandra Terminus–Hazrat Nizamuddin Garib Rath Express (12909/12010)
- Mewar Express (12963/12964)
- Singrauli–Hazrat Nizamuddin Superfast Express (22167/22168)
- Gondwana Express (22181/22182)
- Tamil Nadu Express (12621/12622)
- Thiruvananthapuram–Hazrat Nizamuddin Express (Via Alappuzha) (22633/22634)
- Thiruvananthapuram–Hazrat Nizamuddin Express (via Kottayam) (22653/22654)
- Ernakulam–Hazrat Nizamuddin Express (22655/22656)
- Gwalior Sushasan Express (22199/22200)
- Malwa Express (12919/12920)
- Golden Temple Mail (12903/12904)
- Karnataka Express (12627/12628)
- Hirakud Express (20807/20808)
- Dr. Ambedkar Nagar Superfast Express (20155/20156)
- Rishikesh Express (22659/22660)
- Sainagar Shirdi–Kalka Express (22455/22456)
- Grand Trunk Express (12615/12616)
- Telangana Express (12723/12724)
- Valsad Superfast Express (12911/12912)
- Taj Express (12279/12280)
- SMVD Katra Superfast Express (12475/12476)
- Trivandrum Express (12483/12484)

== Location ==
The station is connected to the Delhi Metro network via the Sarai Kale Khan Nizamuddin metro station on the Pink Line. It is also linked to the Sarai Kale Khan ISBT that provides long and short-haul bus services to neighbouring states. The Namo Bharat (RRTS) station, Sarai Kale Khan, located in close proximity, is planned to be the origin for semi high-speed regional transit services, connecting the station to neighbouring cities and enhancing connectivity across the National Capital Region. It is currently the terminus of the Delhi–Meerut RRTS. Sarai Kale Khan serves as a multimodal transportation hub between several modes of transport (bus, metro, rapid rail, mainline Indian Railway).

== Services ==
Hazrat Nizamuddin railway station serves as a key connection to major cities and was developed to alleviate congestion at the New Delhi railway station, which is located about 7 kilometres (4.3 miles) to the north. It is the origin and terminating point for the premier Rajdhani Express trains heading to Mumbai, Bengaluru, Thiruvananthapuram, Madgaon, Chennai and Secunderabad.

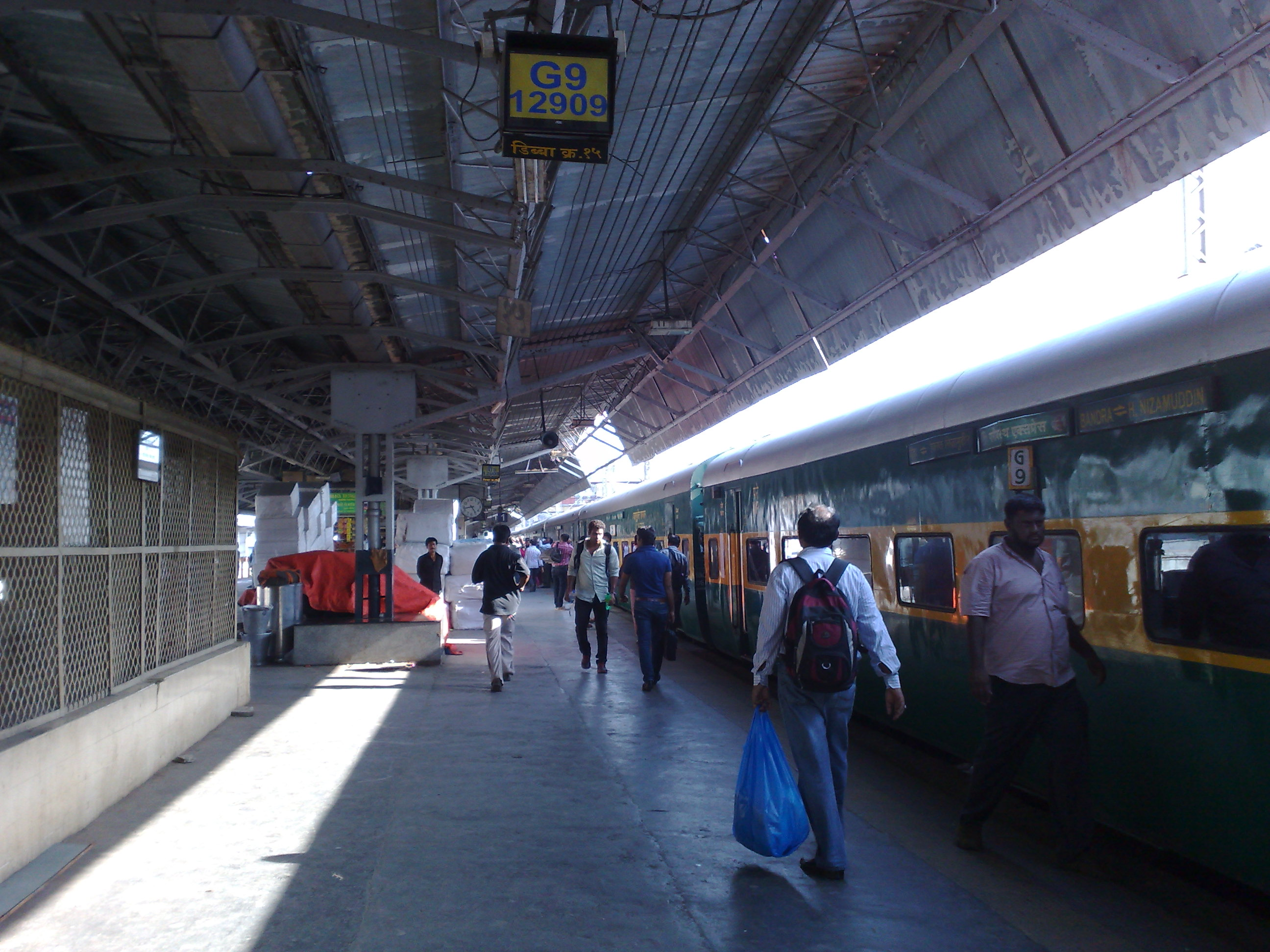
Garib Rath Express at one of the platforms

== Revamp ==
As part of a comprehensive redevelopment and beautification initiative, Indian Railways undertook significant upgrades to passenger facilities at Hazrat Nizamuddin railway station in 2019. The station now features digital information boards displaying train names, numbers, platform details, and timings. All platforms have been equipped with modern lifts and escalators, while green polycarbonate sheeting on the platform roofs helps maintain a cooler environment. The station has been refreshed with a new colour scheme for the platform shelters and vibrant traditional murals adorn the approach road. Platforms 2 and 3 now boast vacuum-dewatered flooring, enhancing cleanliness and reducing the risk of slips.

Additional improvements include two reverse osmosis water systems with taps on the platforms, water vending machines, and the installation of approximately 300 new steel benches. Waste segregation is facilitated through separate dustbins for dry and wet waste, and a dedicated sanitation helpline has been introduced for passengers to report cleanliness concerns. For enhanced security, marshals are stationed on the platforms, Delhi Police officers monitor the entry and exit points, and CCTV cameras are strategically placed throughout the station.

Furthermore, the station now offers designated lanes for autos, taxis, and ride-hailing services such as Ola and Uber. A premium parking area has been created in front of the station building, while new landscaping and fountains have been added along the access road, adding to the station's overall charm.

== Rooftop solar ==
As part of Indian Railways' plan to save ₹41,000 crore in energy consumption and generate 1,000 megawatts (MW) from solar power, with 500 MW from rooftop installations, the Northern Railways contracted a company in 2016 to install 0.6 MW of rooftop solar capacity at Hazrat Nizamuddin station. The project was developed under a public-private partnership on a design, build, finance, operate, and transfer (DBFOT) basis, with the contractor responsible for maintaining the plant for 25 years.

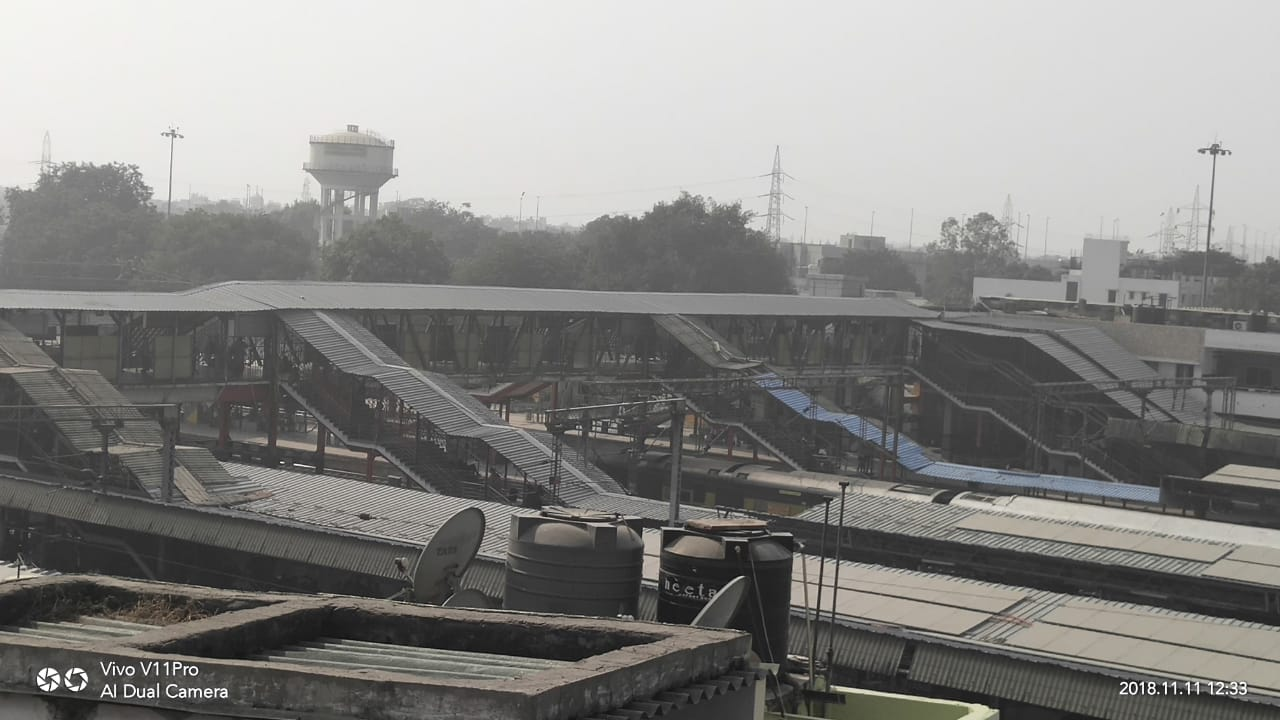
Station access stairs and platforms, 2018

== See also ==
- Anand Vihar Terminal
- New Delhi railway station
- Delhi Junction railway station
- Delhi Sarai Rohilla railway station
- Shakurbasti railway station
- Sarai Kale Khan - Nizamuddin metro station
- Delhi Metro
- Victoria Terminus
