= Mangala Lakshadweep Express =

Train in India

Mangala Lakshadweep Superfast Express
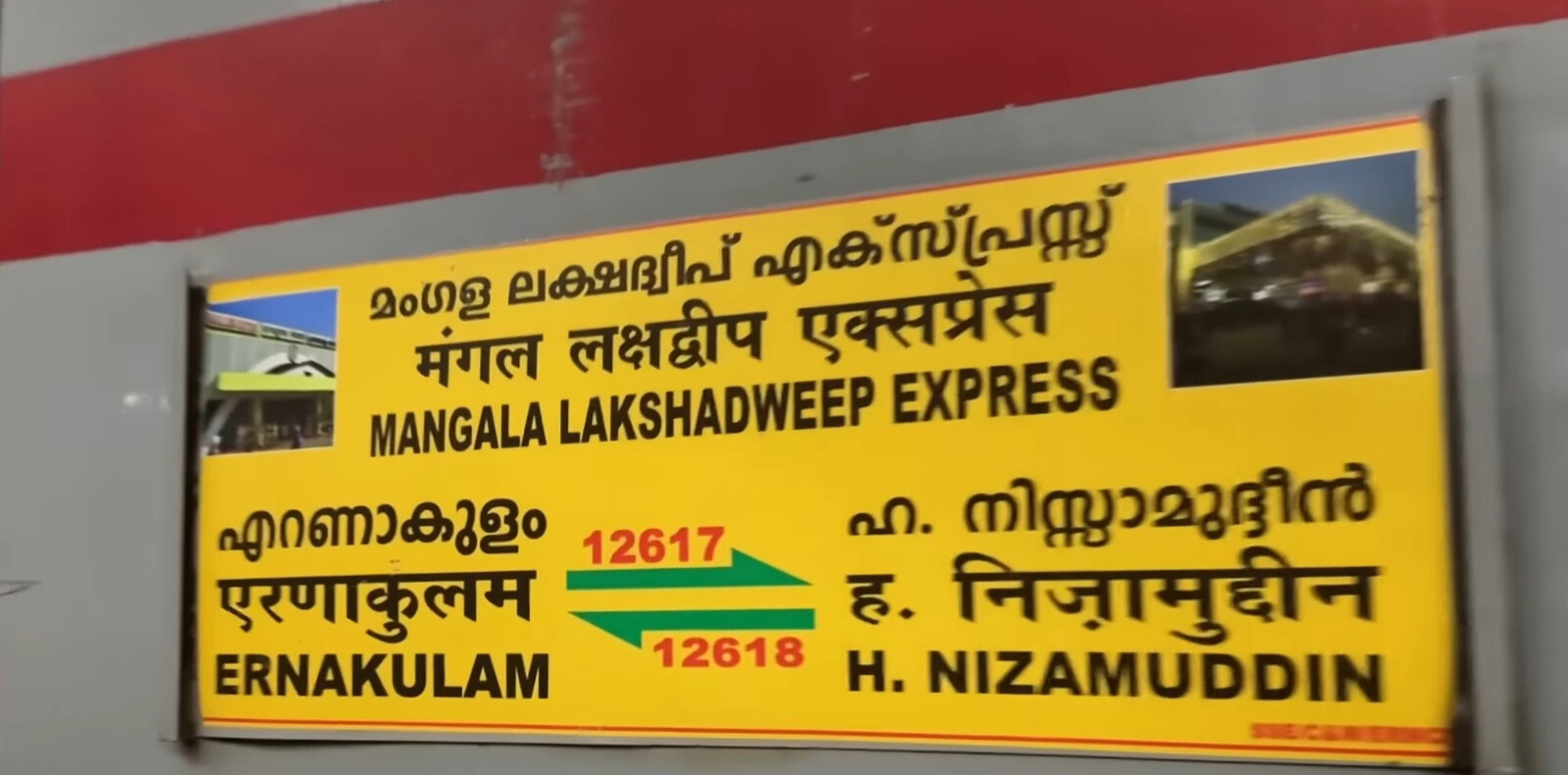

Overview
- Service type: Super fast Express
- Status: Daily Running
- First service: 1 April 1973; 53 years ago
- Current operator: Southern Railway

Route
- Termini: Hazrat Nizamuddin (NZM); Ernakulam Junction (ERS)
- Stops: 46
- Distance travelled: 3,073 km (1,909 mi)
- Average journey time: 49 hours
- Service frequency: Daily
- Train number: 12617 / 12618

On-board services
- Classes: AC 2 tier, AC 3 tier Economy, AC 3 tier, Sleeper class, General Unreserved
- Seating arrangements: Yes
- Sleeping arrangements: Yes
- Catering facilities: Available
- Observation facilities: Large windows
- Baggage facilities: Available

Technical
- Rolling stock: LHB coach
- Track gauge: 1,676 mm (5 ft 6 in)
- Electrification: Fully Electrified
- Operating speed: 58 km/h (36 mph) average with halts.
Route map
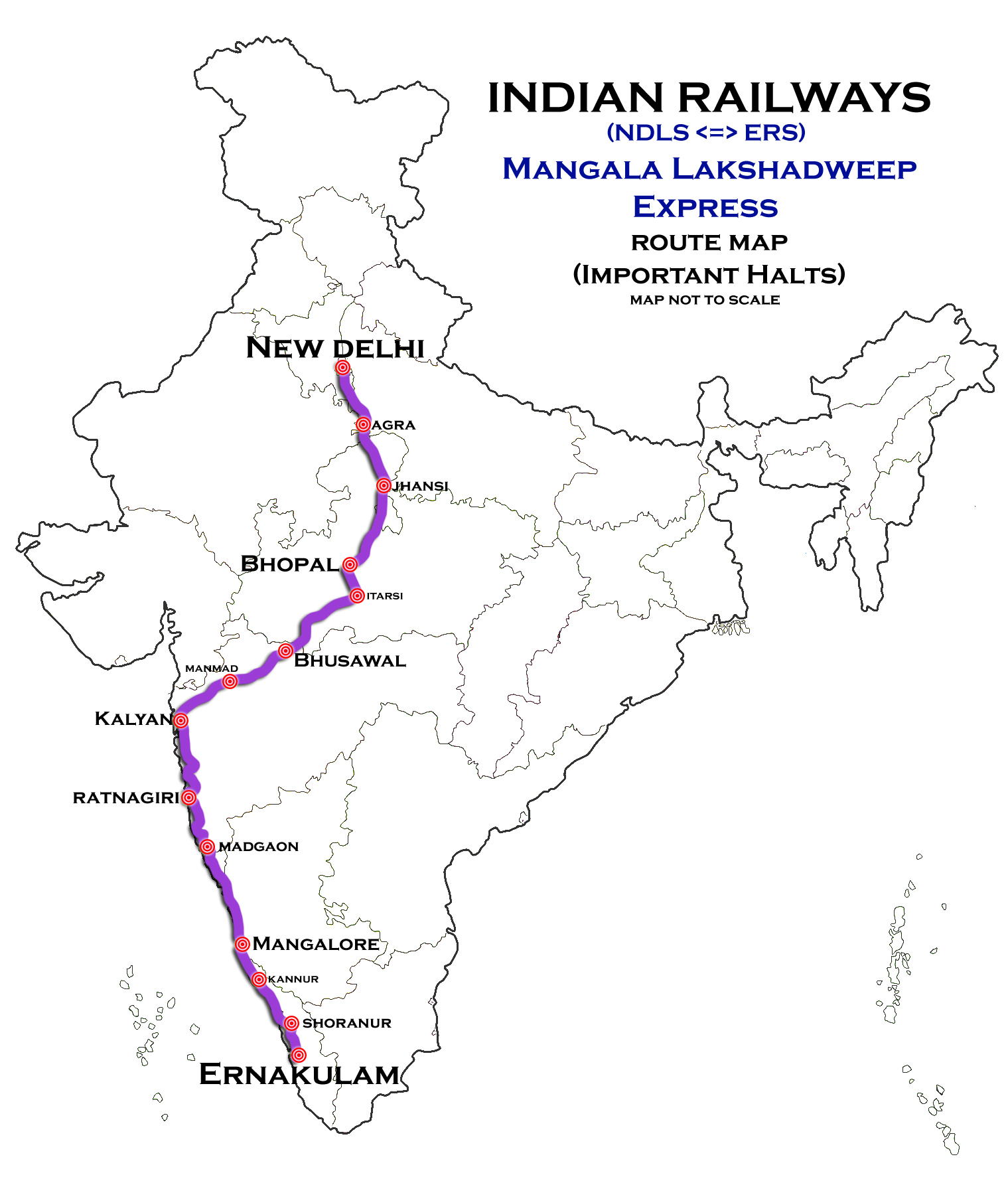
- Mangala Lakshadweep Express (NDLS–ERS) route map

The 12617 / 12618 Mangala Lakshadweep Superfast Express previously called : Mangala Express , is a Daily Superfast Express train in India that runs between Hazrat Nizamuddin in Delhi and Ernakulam Junction in Kochi, Kerala via the Konkan Railway route. It is operated by Southern Railway with 12617 / 12618 train numbers. In 1973, the earlier version of this train (Jayanti Janata Express (131/32)) was the first direct train to Kerala and Coastal Karnataka from the national capital. In its renewed form as Mangala Lakshadweep Express, it became the 1st daily train connecting North, Central Kerala and New Delhi after Kerala Express (1977). It is also regarded as the 1st daily direct access train to the national capital for the Malabar (North Kerala) districts, Coastal Karnataka districts and Lakshadweep.

== The train's name and history ==
The train was started on 26 January 1973 when T. A. Pai was the Minister of Railways. It was started as the first direct train from New Delhi to Kerala and Karnataka. Till then the people of Kerala and Karnataka relied on Grand Trunk Express that operated between Chennai and New Delhi for travel to the capital.

The train then was composed of only second class as Janata Express trains introduced then envisaged a classless society and upheld principles of socialism. It was called Jayanti Janata Express since 1972–73 was the Silver Jubilee (Rajatha Jayanthi) of Indian Independence. The train had two slips one that bifurcated at Shoranur Junction and travelled to Ernakulam Junction and other to Mangalore Central. The Jayanti Janatha Express was discontinued in the 1980s & by the late '80s Mangala Express ran as a slip train, for Kerala Exp which bifurcated/amalgamated at Palakkad Junction. The train number was 2625A/2626A and was christened Link Mangala Exp (MAQ–PGT–MAQ). Since the Konkan Railway was not yet constructed, the train was earlier running between Mangalore and Delhi in a roundabout route through Palakkad Junction, Erode Junction.

Later in 1993, the slip service got discontinued & this train was made independent & officially renamed as 2617/18 Mangala Express. Since the train was running till Mangalore, the name Mangala was derived from Mangaladevi, the most important deity of Mangalore city. In 1998–99 when Konkan Railway was opened this train got rerouted to Mangaluru via Konkan. Later, Ram Vilas Paswan extended this train to Ernakulam Junction in Kochi for the purpose of providing rail connection to Lakshadweep passengers who arrive at Kochi via ship. The booking facilities were opened at Kavaratti. Subsequently, the train got renamed as Mangala Lakshadweep Express.

== Traction ==
As the route is completely electrified a Royapuram Loco Shed / Erode Loco Shed-based WAP-7 or WAP-4 electric locomotive hauls the train throughout its entire journey.

== Timings ==
=== Current timings ===
This train leaves Ernakulam Junction at 13:30 hrs to reach Hazrat Nizamuddin at 13:30 hrs on the 3rd day. Return this train leaves Hazrat Nizamuddin at 05:40 to reach Ernakulam Junction at 07:10 on the 3rd day. It covers a distance of 2,767 kilometres (1,719 mi) in about 48 hrs 45 mins at an average of 57 km/h (35 mph). The monsoon timings of the train are different and takes 2 hrs 15 minutes more to complete the journey.

=== Timings before Konkan Railway ===
This train left Mangalore at 16:10 hrs to reach Hazrat Nizamuddin at 20:25 hrs on the 3rd day. Return this train left Hazrat Nizamuddin at 08:50 hrs to reach Mangaluru at 13:05 hrs on the 3rd day. It covered a distance of 3,014 kilometres (1,873 mi) in about 52 hours 15 mins at an average of 58 km/h (36 mph).

== Incidents ==
- On 22 February 2013, 4 coaches of the 12618 Hazrat Nizamuddin–Ernakulam Mangala Express derailed near Nashik, leaving 20 persons injured.
- On 15 November 2013, 10 coaches including all the AC coaches of the 12618 Hazrat Nizamuddin–Ernakulam Mangala Express derailed near Nashik again at 6:40 a.m., leaving 5 persons dead and 50 injured. In both cases, track rupture is suggested as cause of the accident.
- On 1 March 2015 3 coaches of 12617 ( S9, S10 & Pantry car) Hazrat Nizamuddin–Ernakulam derailed near Pen, Raigad district with no casualties reported since the train was just outbound on the station and picking up speed.

== Route and halts ==
- Hazrat Nizamuddin
- Mathura
- Agra Cantt.
- Gwalior Junction
- Jhansi Junction
- Bina Junction
- Bhopal Junction
- Itarsi Junction
- Khandwa Junction
- Burhanpur
- Bhusaval Junction
- Manmad Junction
- Nashik Road
- Kalyan Junction
- Panvel
- Khed
- Chiplun
- Ratnagiri
- Madgaon Junction
- Karwar
- Kumta
- Bhatkal
- Kundapura
- Udupi
- Mangaluru Junction
- Kasaragod
- Nileshwar
- Payyanur
- Kannur
- Thalassery
- Vadakara
- Koyilandi
- Kozhikode
- Tirur
- Pattambi
- Shoranur Junction
- Thrissur
- Aluva
- Ernakulam Junction

== Rake composition ==
The Train started running with upgraded LHB coaches starting from 12 December 2021 from Ernakulam and 15 December 2021 from Nizamuddin.

- 2 AC II Tier
- 4 AC III Tier
- 2 AC III Tier Economy
- 9 Sleeper coaches
- 3 General
- 1 Generator van
- 1 General coach Divyangjan Friendly
- 1 Pantry car

Loco	1	2	3	4	5	6	7	8	9	10	11	12	13	14	15	16	17	18	19	20	21	22	23
	EOG	GC	A1	A2	B4	B3	B2	B1	M1	M2	PC	S9	S8	S7	S6	S5	S4	S3	S2	S1	GC	GC	SLR

- (Coach Position of 12617 ERS NZM Mangala Express )

No rake sharing.
