= Grand Trunk Express =

Train in India

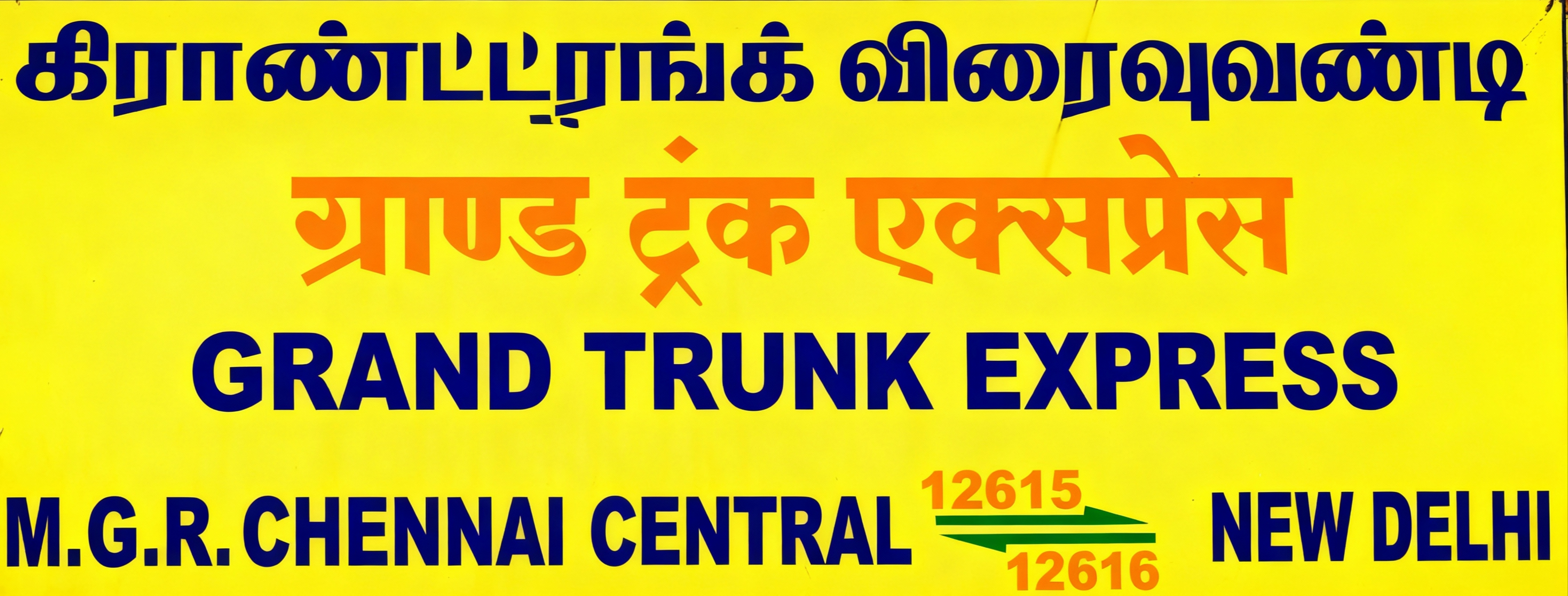

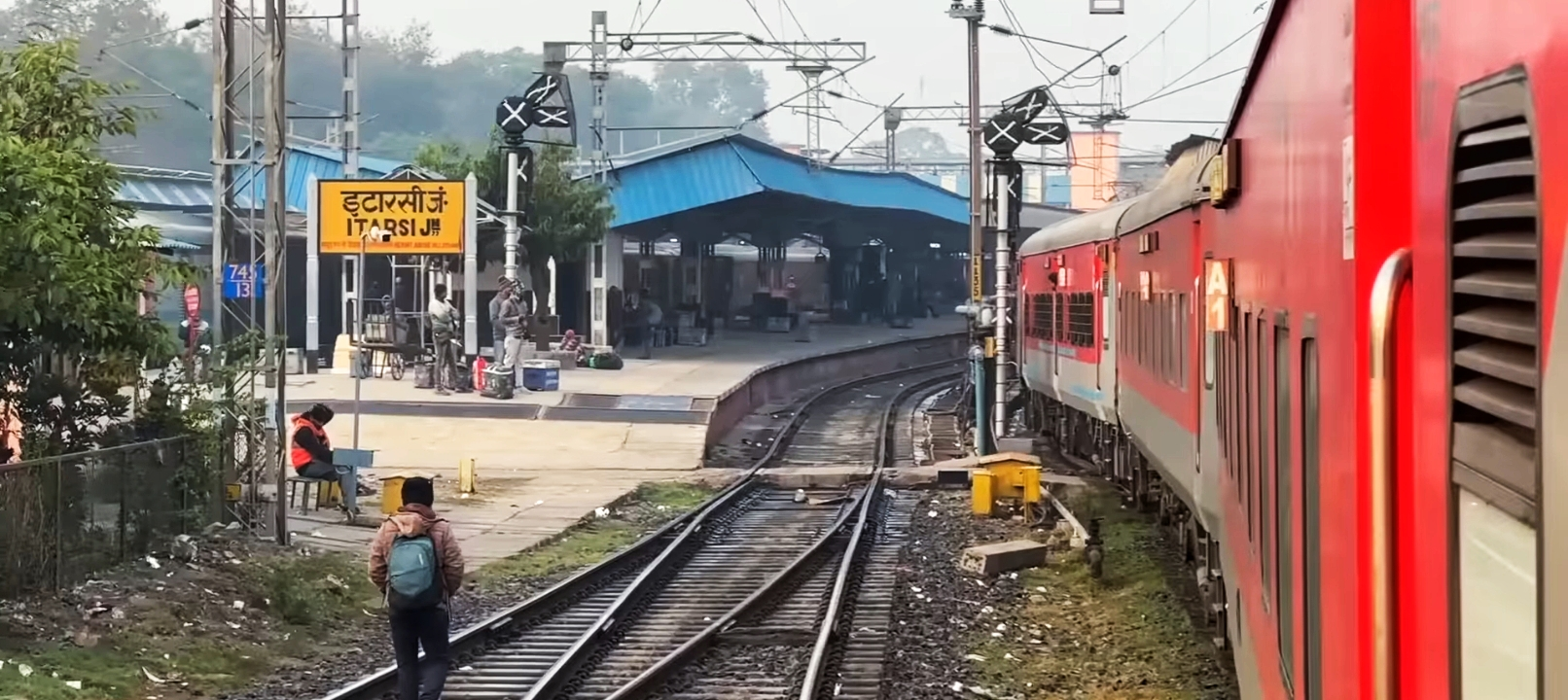
- Grand Trunk Express at Itarsi Junction

Overview
- Service type: Superfast Express
- First service: 1 April 1929; 97 years ago
- Current operator: Southern Railway

Route
- Termini: Chennai Egmore (MS); New Delhi (NDLS)
- Stops: 36
- Distance travelled: 2,211 km (1,374 mi)
- Average journey time: 36 hours
- Service frequency: Daily
- Train number: 12615 / 12616

On-board services
- Classes: AC First Class, AC 2 Tier, AC 3 Tier, Sleeper Class, General Unreserved
- Seating arrangements: Yes
- Sleeping arrangements: Yes
- Catering facilities: Available
- Observation facilities: Large windows
- Baggage facilities: Available
- Other facilities: Below the seats

Technical
- Rolling stock: LHB coach
- Track gauge: 1,676 mm (5 ft 6 in)
- Operating speed: 62 km/h (39 mph) average including halts.
Route map
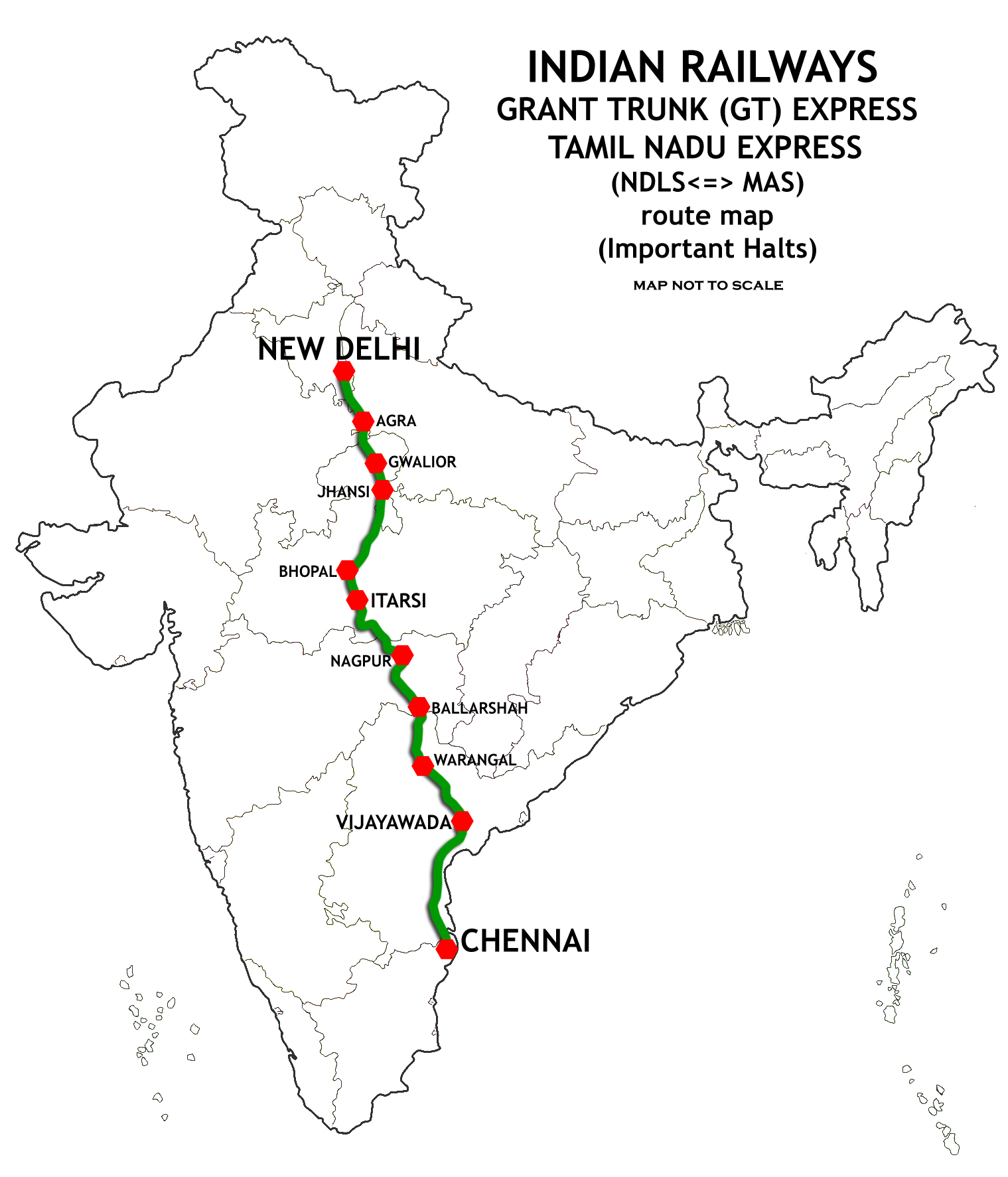

The 12615 / 12616 Grand Trunk Express (commonly called G.T. or G.T Express) is a Daily Superfast Express train on Indian Railways, running between New Delhi and Madras Central. From February 2024, the train starts from Madras Egmore. It is a historic train and is one of the oldest trains starting services in 1929. It originally ran between Peshawar in the North West Frontier Province (present-day capital of the Khyber Pakhtunkhwa province, Pakistan) and Mangalore Central in the Madras Presidency (present-day city in Karnataka, India). From September 2021, it runs with modern new LHB coach with revised coach position.

== History ==
For most of the 19th century, the main railway route from Madras to Calcutta and Delhi was through Bombay. The Madras–Bombay mail train carried through carriages between Madras and Manmad which were detached at Daund. Passengers would then transfer to the Great Indian Peninsular Railway's Calcutta Mail at Manmad to proceed to the northern and the eastern parts of the country. The East Coast line between Madras and Calcutta opened in 1900, providing a shorter route for the passengers bound to Calcutta, but the passengers bound to Delhi, Lahore and other major cities in the north, continued to rely on the Madras–Manmad mail service.

A record in through-train running was set in 1921 by a military train conveying families of a regiment from Peshawar to Cannanore (now Kannur in Kerala). The journey represented a continuous run of over 2500 miles over the North Western Railway (British India), Great Indian Peninsular Railway, Madras and Southern Mahratta Railway and the South Indian Railway. Following this record journey, interest in a shorter through route between Madras and Delhi was rekindled and the Nizam's Guaranteed State Railway hastened the construction of the missing rail link between Kazipet and Balharshah Junction. The link was opened throughout on 15 November 1928 with the commissioning of the Asifabad Road – Balharshah Junction section. This link reduced the distance between Madras and Delhi by over 200 miles.

From 1 April 1929 the 'Grand Trunk' express commenced operating as two through carriages running between Peshawar in the North Western Railway (British India) and Mangalore in the South Indian Railway. The two coaches, consisting of a composite First and Second class coach and a composite Third class and Luggage coach, made their way to Madras attached to the South Indian Railway's Mangalore–Madras mail train. Between Madras and Itarsi sectional coaches to Itarsi, Bezwada (now Vijayawada) and Hyderabad were operated. At Itarsi, the two through coaches from Mangalore were attached to the Great Indian Peninsular Railway's Bombay–Delhi service. In the final leg of the journey between Delhi and Peshawar, the two through carriages were attached to the Frontier Mail and reached Peshawar traveling through Bathinda, Ferozepore and Lahore. Thus the train covered a distance of 2497 miles in a little over 96 hours. This was not an independent train and the name 'Grand Trunk express' only referred to the 2 through carriages operating between Mangalore and Peshawar.

Shortly after the inauguration of the service, from 15 October 1929, the two through carriages operating between Mangalore and Peshawar were restricted to run between Mettupalayam and Delhi with Slip Coach to Peshawar/Landi Kotal . From 1 March 1930, the service was extended to Lahore.

As the train consisted of only 2 through coaches, it proved insufficient to meet the traffic requirements. In addition, the train's schedule depended on the schedules of the trains carrying the through carriages, and was thus subject to regular delays. This led to a revision in the operation of the train and the revamped 'Grand Trunk express' commenced operating as a dedicated daily train between Madras and Delhi from 1 September 1930. The rakes used for the train were supplied by the Great Indian Peninsular Railway for the next few years.

Until the mid-1960s, the Grand Trunk Express completed the 1356 mile journey between Madras and New Delhi in about 50 hours. After the introduction of the Dakshin Express in 1968, the Grand Trunk Express was moved to a faster schedule. For a few years after the change in schedule, the train operated as a fully air-conditioned service for two days every week and with a mixed consist on the remaining 5 days. In time, the air-conditioned service was discontinued. Today, the train covers the 2182.4 kilometer journey in 35 hours and 15 minutes, with 40 halts (exclusive of the terminals) at an average speed of 62kmph.

From 10 December 2015, the train started terminating at Delhi Sarai Rohilla instead of New Delhi. From 12 May 2018, the terminal was reverted to New Delhi.

From 9 February 2024, This train got shifted to Madras Egmore few kms away from Chennai Central. Additional stoppage provided in Chennai Egmore.

== Timings ==
12615 Madras Egmore - New Delhi Grand Trunk Express leaves Madras Egmore by 17:40 and reaches New Delhi by 05:05 the third day.

12616 New Delhi - Madras Egmore Grand Trunk Express leaves New Delhi by 16:10 and reaches Madras Egmore by 05:00 the third day.

== Schedule and service ==
The train passes through the states of Tamil Nadu, Andhra Pradesh, Telangana, Maharashtra, Madhya Pradesh, Rajasthan, Uttar Pradesh, Haryana and Delhi.

As per the numbering of the Indian Railways, the train has been assigned the numbers 12615/12616, with 12615 being assigned for the Madras Egmore (MS) – New Delhi (NDLS) run and 12616 for the New Delhi (NDLS) – Madras Egmore (MS) run.

== Coach composition ==
It runs with LHB coach. It has a total of 22 coaches.

- 1 AC First Class Cum AC Two Tier
- 2 AC Two Tier
- 6 AC Three Tier
- 6 Sleeper class
- 1 Pantry car
- 4 General Unreserved
- 1 Luggage Cum Disabled Coach
- 1 End On Generator Car

== Route and halts ==
The important halts of Grand Trunk Express are :-

- MGR Chennai Central
- Gudur Junction
- Nellore
- Ongole
- Vijayawada Junction
- Khammam
- Warangal
- Ramagundam
- Mancherial
- Balharshah Junction
- Nagpur Junction
- Itarsi Junction
- Bhopal Junction
- Jhansi Junction
- Gwalior Junction
- Agra Cantonment
- Mathura Junction
- New Delhi

== Traction ==
earlier was WDP-4D or WDM-3D. It is hauled by a Royapuram based WAP-7 so was WAP-4 locomotive on its entire journey.

== Gallery ==
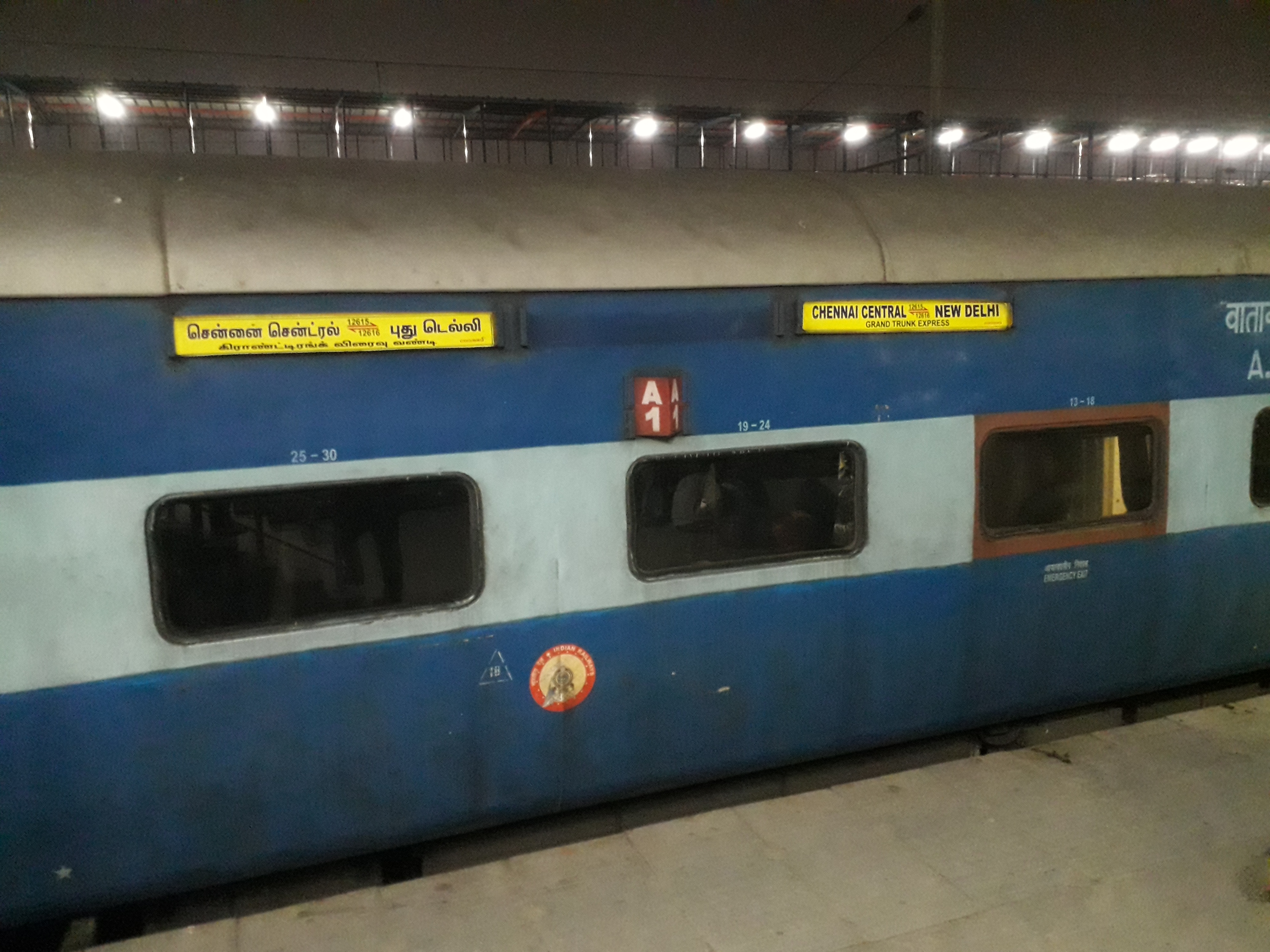
Grand Trunk Express – AC 2 tier coach

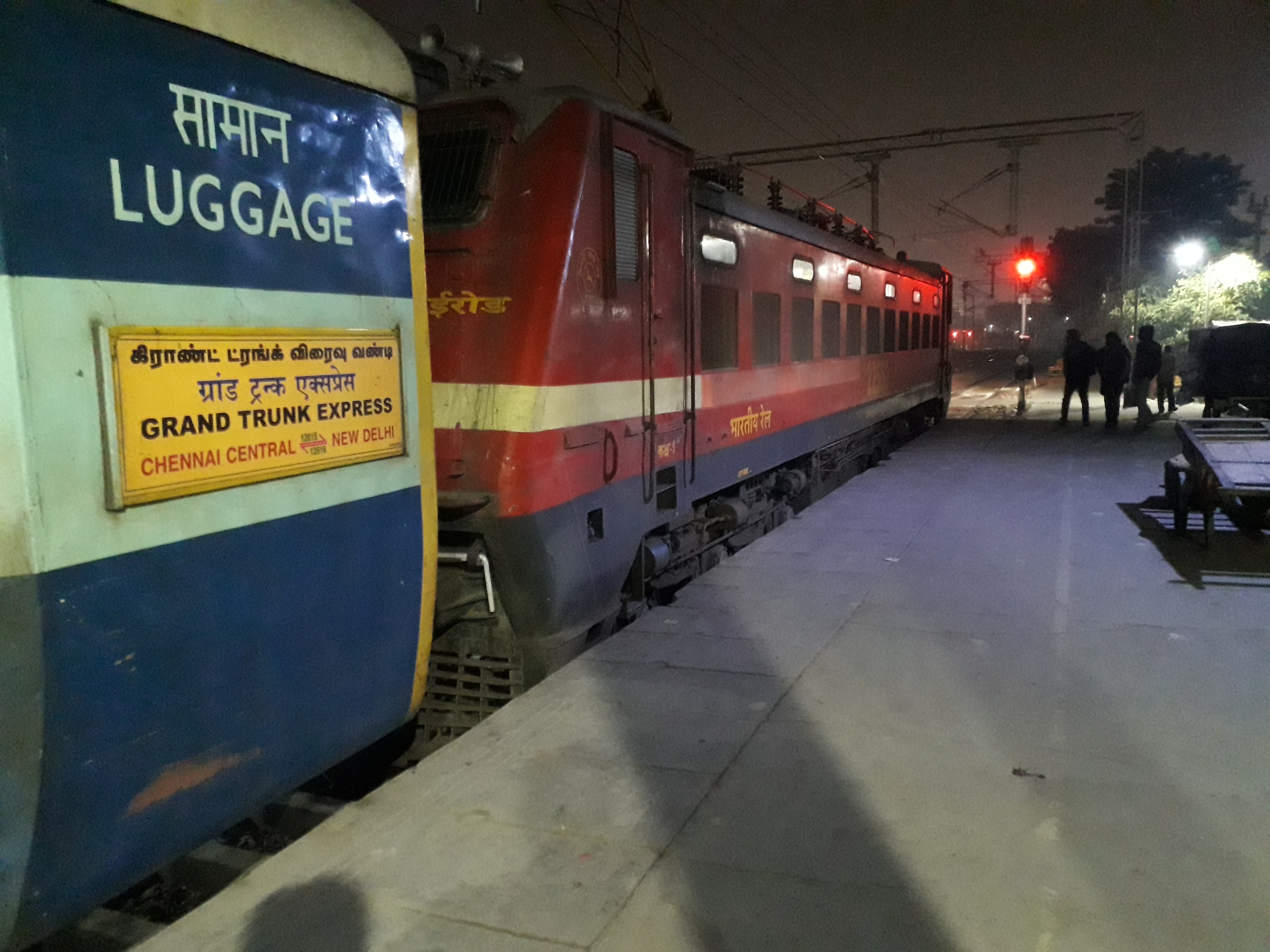
Grand Trunk Express with Erode-based WAP-4

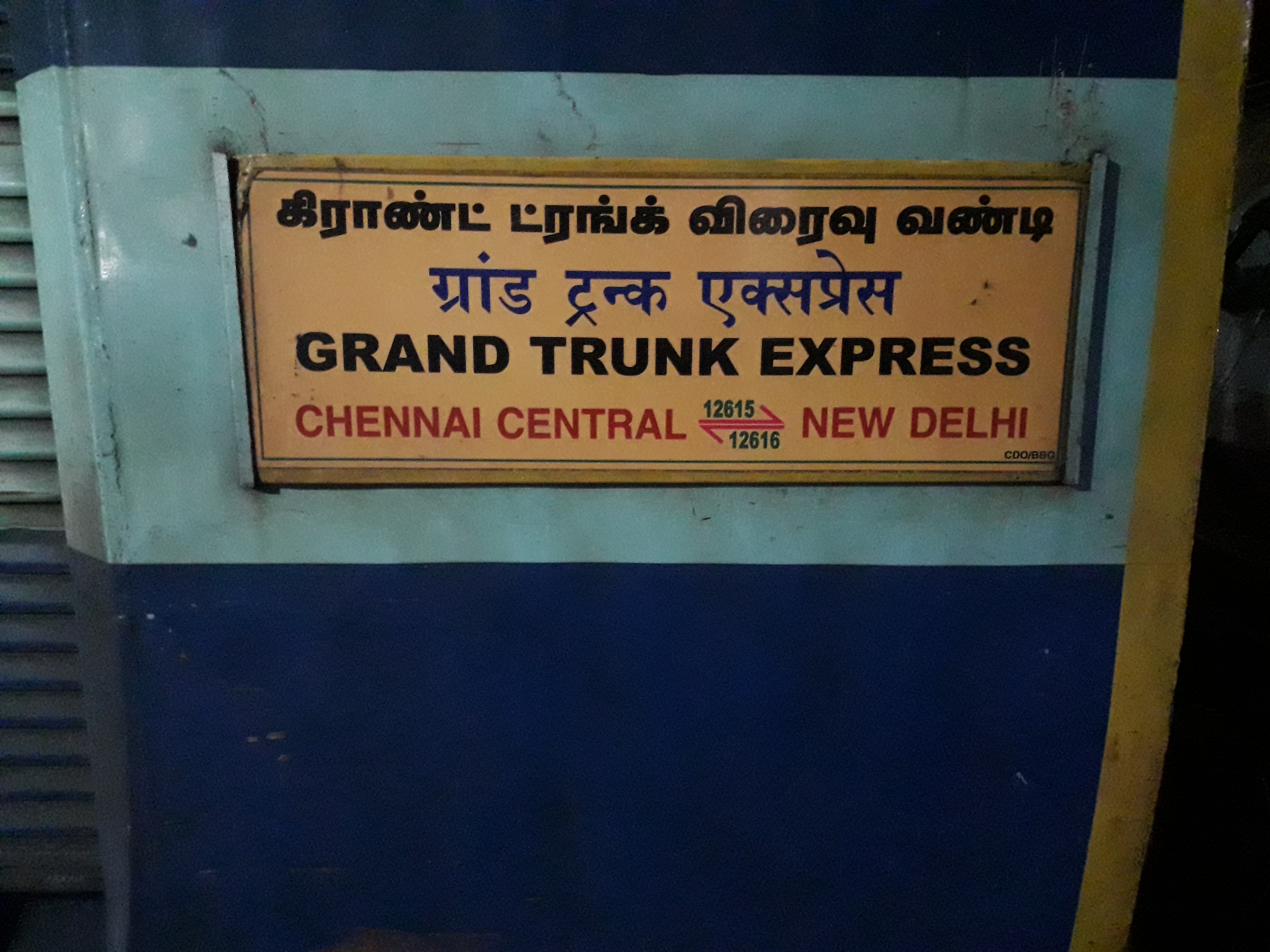
Grand Trunk Express – Train board

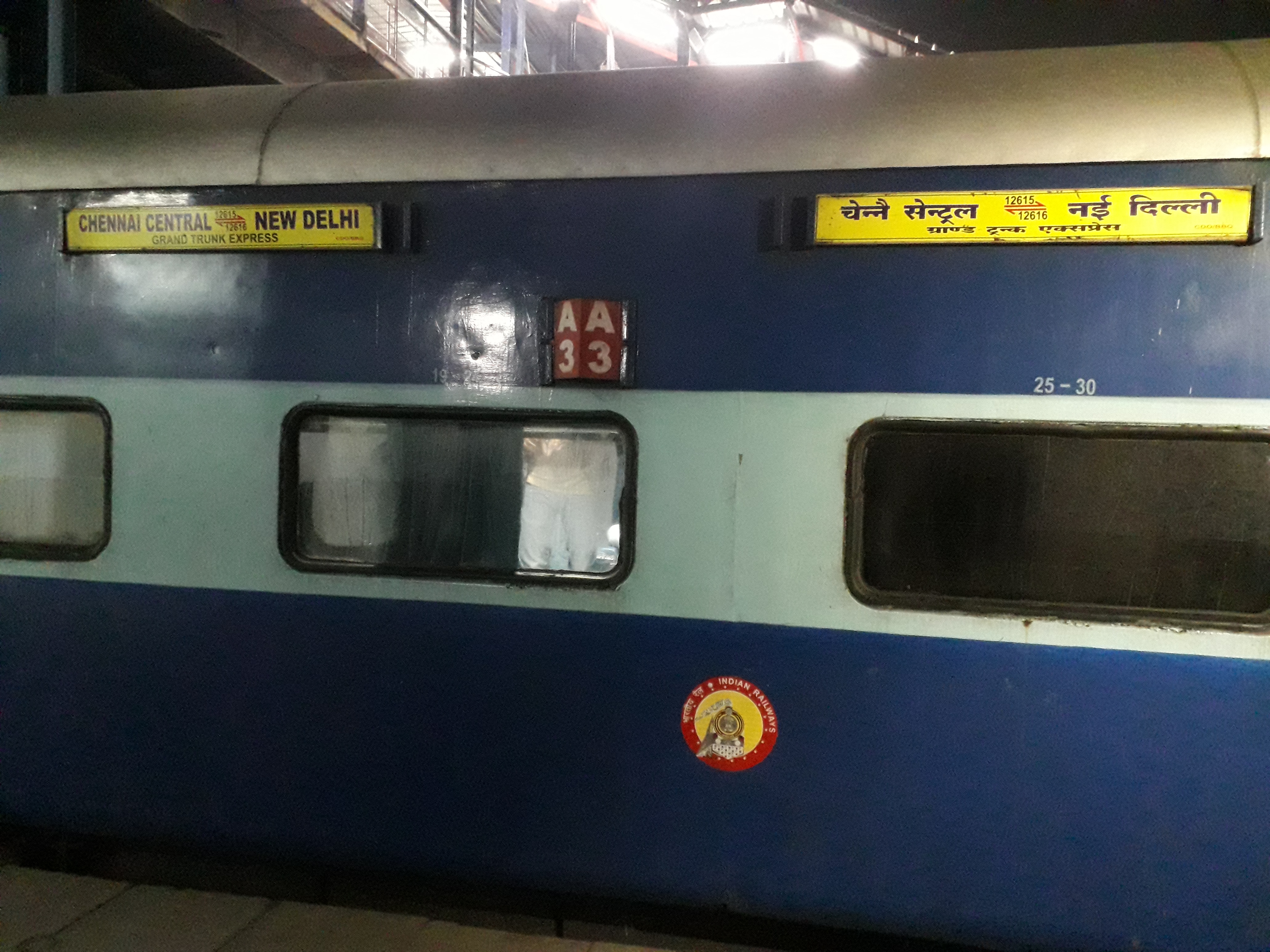
Grand Trunk Express – AC 2 tier coach – A3

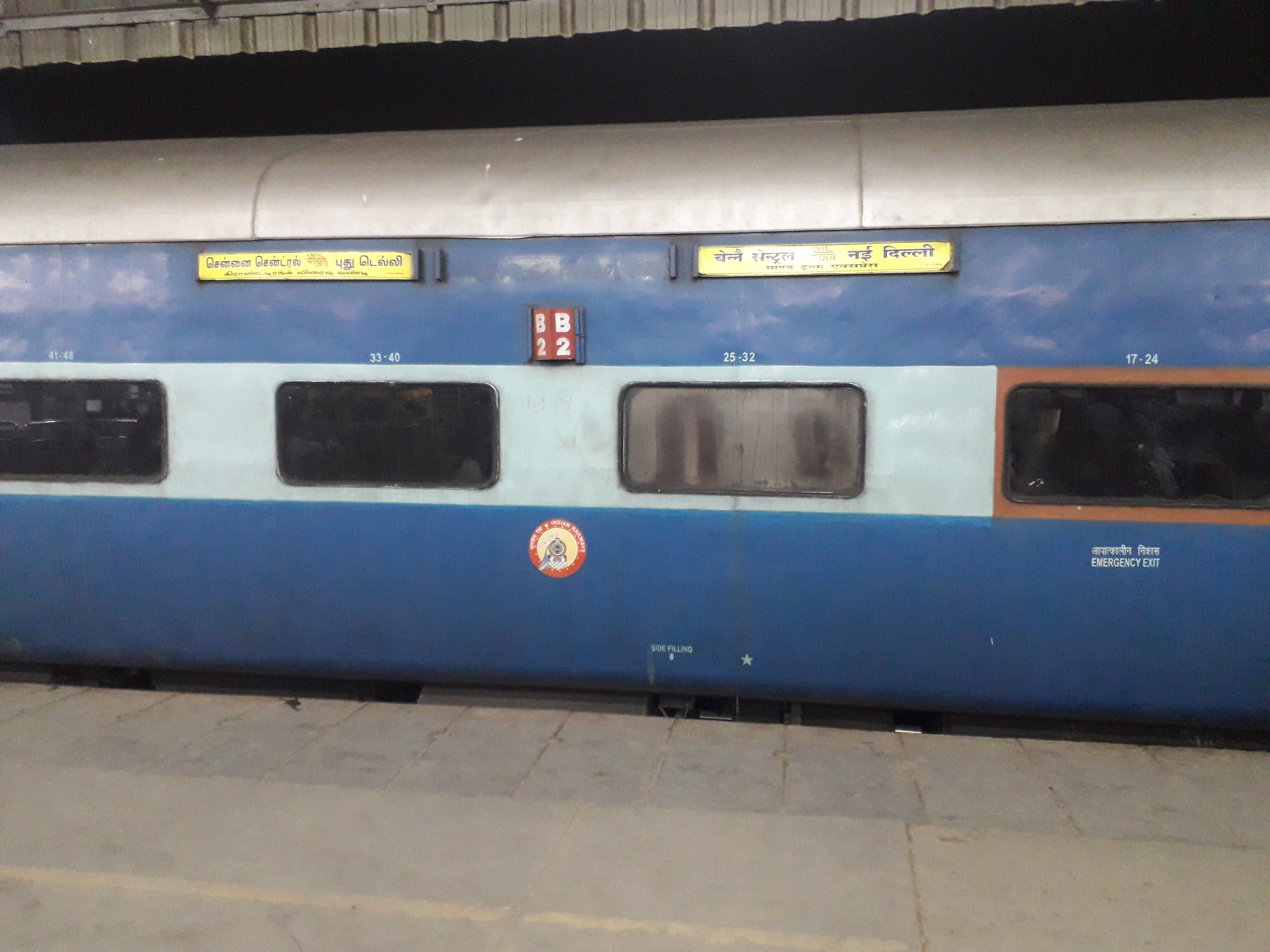
Grand Trunk Express – AC 3 tier coach

== See also ==
- Andaman Express
- Vivek Express
- Himsagar Express
- Kerala Express
- Thirukural Express
- Ganga Kaveri Express
