= Thirukkural Express =

Train in India

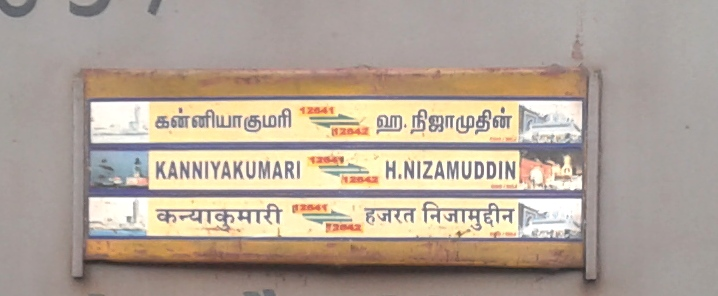
- Thirukkural Express train board.

Overview
- Service type: Superfast
- Locale: Kerala, Tamil Nadu, Andhra Pradesh, Telangana, Maharashtra, Madhya Pradesh, Uttar Pradesh, Rajasthan, Haryana & Delhi
- Current operator: Southern Railway

Route
- Termini: Kanniyakumari (CAPE); Hazrat Nizamuddin (NZM)
- Stops: 21
- Distance travelled: 2,919 km (1,814 mi)
- Average journey time: 46 hours 5 minutes
- Service frequency: Bi-weekly
- Train number: 12641 / 12642

On-board services
- Classes: AC 2 Tier, AC 3 Tier, Sleeper Class, General Unreserved
- Seating arrangements: Yes
- Sleeping arrangements: Yes
- Catering facilities: Available
- Observation facilities: Large windows
- Baggage facilities: Available
- Other facilities: Below the seats

Technical
- Rolling stock: LHB coach
- Track gauge: 1,676 mm (5 ft 6 in)
- Operating speed: 130 km/h (81 mph) maximum speed, 64 km/h (40 mph) average including halts.
- Rake maintenance: Nagercoil
Route map
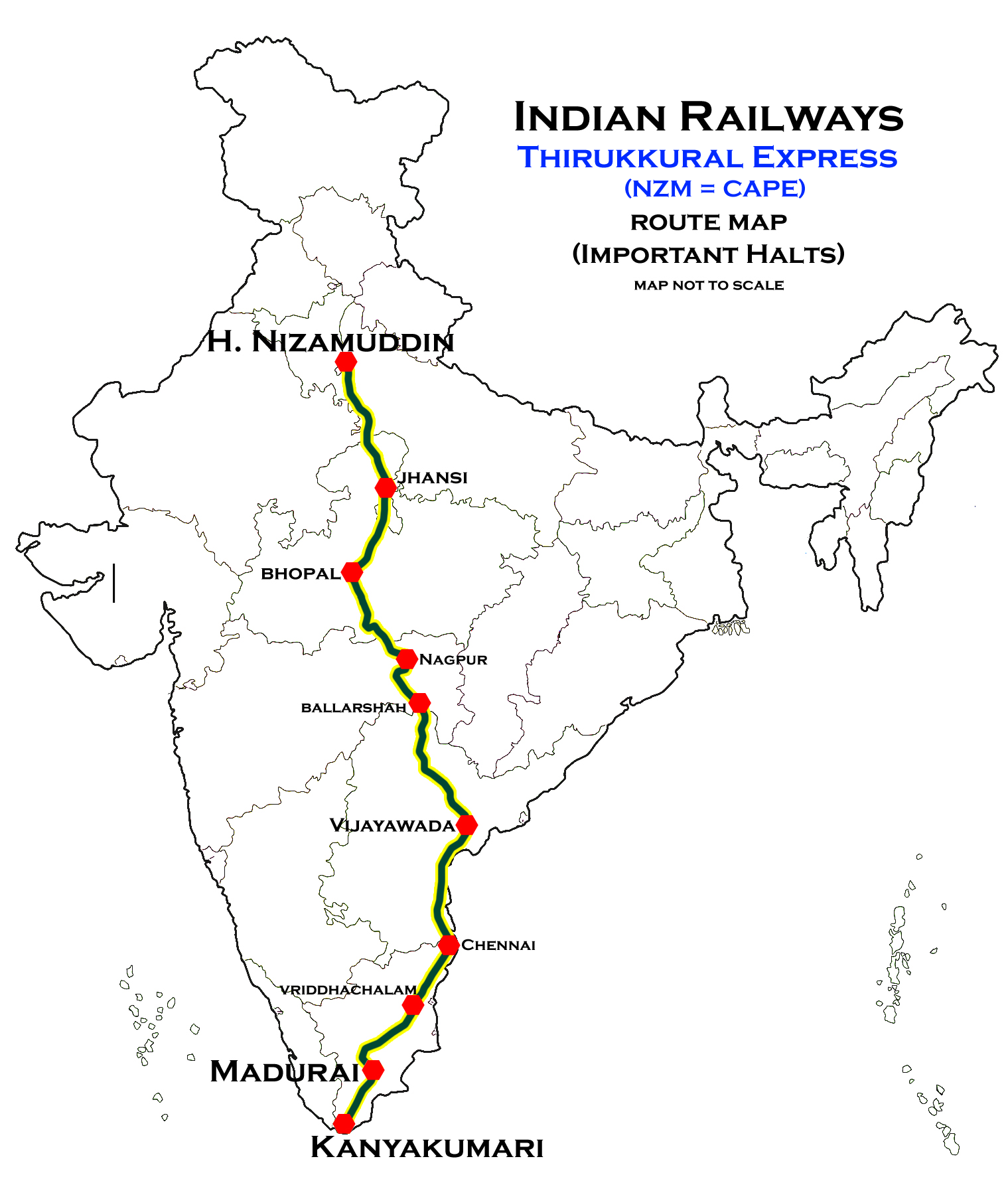

The 12641 / 12642 Thirukkural Express is a superfast express train in India, running between Kanniyakumari in Tamil Nadu which is the southernmost tip of the Indian subcontinent, and Hazrat Nizamuddin in New Delhi. From December 2020, it runs with newly manufactured LHB rakes.

It is currently a bi-weekly train covering a distance of 2,919 kilometres (1,814 mi), making it one of the longest running superfast trains in the country. The train shares a common route and timetable with the Tamil Nadu Sampark Kranti Express from Hazrat Nizamuddin to Dindigul in return and from Madurai to Hazrat Nizamuddin in upward.

== Origin of the name ==
Thirukkural is a book of verses on common ethics and morality written by Tamil Poet Thiruvalluvar. The train was named after the book, with the statue of Thiruvalluvar installed at Kanniyakumari

== Timings ==
The 12641 Hazrat Nizzamuddin–Thirukkural Express departs Kanniyakumari every Wednesday and Friday at 19:05 IST (07:05 PM) and reaches Hazrat Nizamuddin every Friday and Sunday 18:30 IST (06:30 PM). It takes 47 hours and 30 minutes to complete journey.

12642 Kanniyakumari–Thirukkural Express departs Hazrat Nizamuddin every Monday and Saturday at 05:20 IST (05:20 AM) and reaches Kanniyakumari every Wednesday and Monday at 04:45 IST (04:45 AM). It takes 47 hours and 25 minutes to complete journey.

== Coaches ==
It consists of 22 LHB coach with the maximum speed of 130 kmph.

Loco	1	2	3	4	5	6	7	8	9	10	11	12	13	14	15	16	17	18	19	20	21	22
	EOG	UR	2AC^{1}	2AC^{2}	3AC^{1}	3AC^{2}	3AC^{3}	3AC^{4}	SL^{1}	SL^{2}	SL^{3}	SL^{4}	PC	SL^{5}	SL^{6}	SL^{7}	SL^{8}	SL^{9}	SL^{10}	UR	UR	EOG

- Ac two tier - 2 coaches
- Ac three tier - 4 coaches
- Sleeper class - 10 coaches
- (PC) - Pantry car - 1
- ( UR )Unreserved General Class Coach - 3
- 2 EOG
- Loco- Locomotive

== Route ==
This train runs from Kanniyakumari via Nagercoil, Tirunelveli, Kovilpatti, Sattur, Virudhunagar, Madurai, Dindigul, Tiruchirappalli Junction, Vriddhachalam, Viluppuram, Chengalpattu, Tambaram, Chennai Egmore, Vijayawada Junction, Balharshah, Nagpur Junction, Betul, Itarsi, Bhopal Junction, Jhansi Junction, Agra Cantonment to Hazrat Nizamuddin.

== Traction ==
The Train is hauled by a Royapuram Loco Shed or Erode Loco Shed-based WAP-7 electric locomotive on its entire journey.
