= Gholwad =

Village in Maharashtra

Gholwad Gholvad, Golwad
- village
- Location in Maharashtra, India Gholwad (India)
- Coordinates: 20.0803294°N 72.730405°E
- Country: India
- State: Maharashtra
- District: Palghar
- Taluka: Dahanu
- Elevation: 8 m (26 ft)

Population (2011)
  - Total: 4,403
- Time zone: UTC+5:30 (IST)
- PIN: 401702
- STD Code: 2528
- Vehicle registration: MH-48
- 2011 census code: 551583
- Coastline: 0 kilometres (0 mi)
- Nearest city: Mumbai
- Avg. summer temperature: 32 °C (90 °F)
- Avg. winter temperature: 25 °C (77 °F)

Gholwad is a village in the Palghar district of Maharashtra, India. It is located in the Dahanu taluka. It is famous for its production of quality chickoos.

== Demographics ==
According to the 2011 census of India, Gholwad has population of 4403. The effective literacy rate (i.e. the literacy rate of population excluding children aged 6 and below) is 82.59%.
