= Thiruvananthapuram–Hazrat Nizamuddin Express (Via Alappuzha) =

Passenger train in India

Thiruvananthapuram Central–Hazrat Nizamuddin Superfast Express
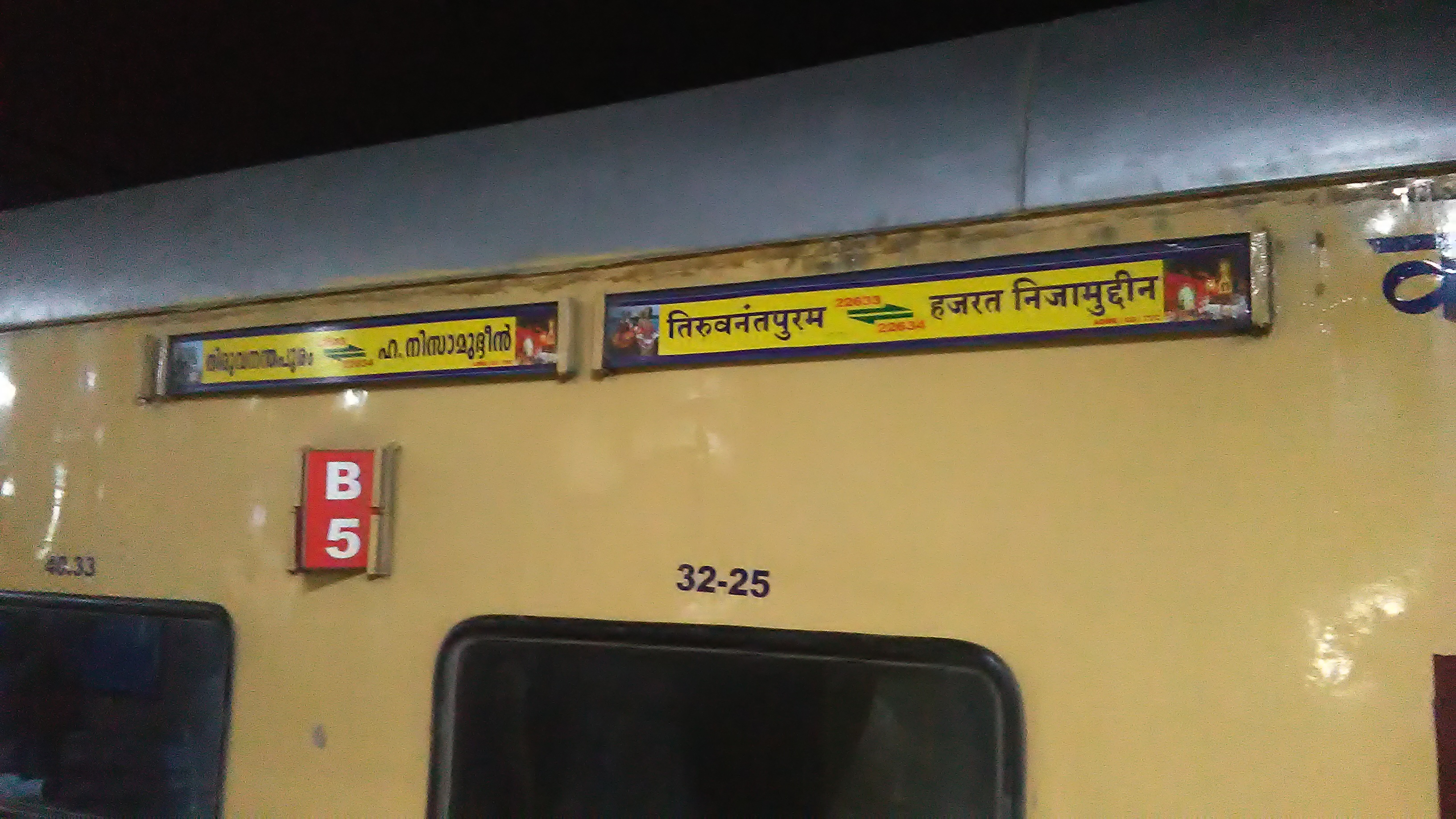

Overview
- Service type: Express
- First service: 5 March 2014; 12 years ago
- Current operator: Southern Railways

Route
- Termini: Thiruvananthapuram Central (TVC); Hazrat Nizamuddin (NZM)
- Stops: 27
- Distance travelled: 3,149 km (1,957 mi)
- Average journey time: 48 hours 00 minutes as 22633, 51 hours 05 minutes as 22634
- Service frequency: Weekly
- Train number: 22633 / 22634

On-board services
- Classes: AC 2 tier, AC 3 tier, Sleeper class, General Unreserved
- Seating arrangements: Yes
- Sleeping arrangements: Yes
- Catering facilities: On-board catering, E-catering
- Observation facilities: Large windows

Technical
- Rolling stock: LHB coach
- Track gauge: 1,676 mm (5 ft 6 in)
- Operating speed: 61 km/h (38 mph) average including halts
Route map
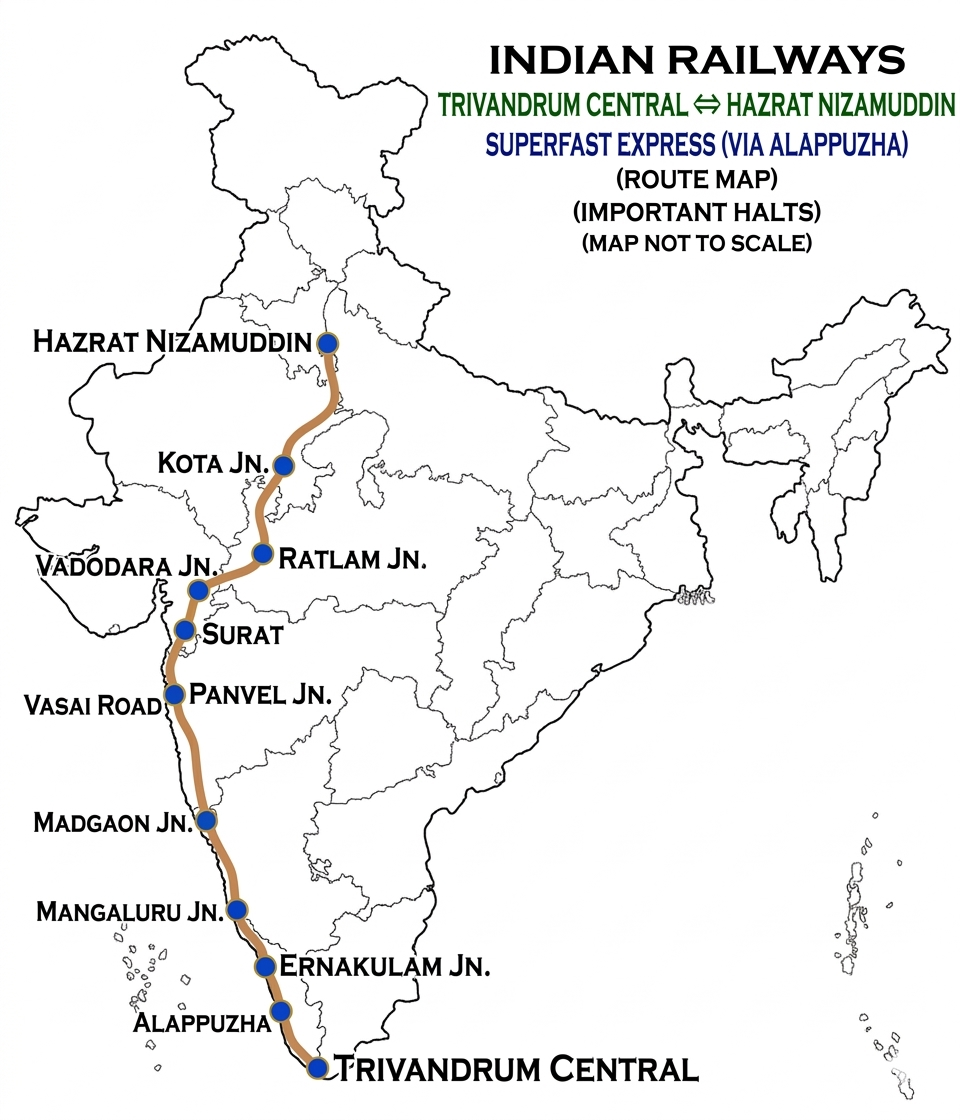

The 22633 / 22634 Thiruvananthapuram Central–Hazrat Nizamuddin Super fast Express is an express train belonging to Indian Railways – Southern Railway zone that runs between Thiruvananthapuram Central and Hazrat Nizamuddin in India.

It operates as train number 22633 from Thiruvananthapuram Central to Hazrat Nizamuddin and as train number 22634 in the reverse direction, serving the states of Kerala, Karnataka, Goa, Maharashtra, Gujarat, Madhya Pradesh, Rajasthan, Uttar Pradesh, Haryana & Delhi.

== Coaches ==
The 22633 / 22634 Thiruvananthapuram Central–Hazrat Nizamuddin Express have 1 AC 2 tier, 6 AC 3 tier, 10 Sleeper class 3 tier, 4 General Unreserved and 2 EOG (Seating cum Luggage Rake) coaches. It does not carry a pantry car.

As it is customary with most train services in India, coach composition may be amended at the discretion of Indian Railways depending on demand.

== Service ==
22633/ Thiruvananthapuram Central–Hazrat Nizamuddin Superfast Express covers the distance of 3,149 km (1,957 mi) in 48 hours (110 km/h) and in 51 hours 05 mins as 22634/Hazrat Nizamuddin–Thiruvananthapuram Central Superfast Express (58 km/h).

== Routeing ==
The 22633 / 22634 Thiruvananthapuram Central–Hazrat Nizamuddin Express runs from Thiruvananthapuram Central via Kollam Junction, Alappuzha, Ernakulam Junction, Shoranur Junction, Mangalore Junction, Madgaon Junction, Panvel, Vasai Road, Surat, Vadodara Junction, Ratlam Junction, Kota Junction, Mathura Junction to Hazrat Nizamuddin.

== Traction ==
earlier was run with WDP-3A. Both trains are hauled by an Electric Loco from Thiruvananthapuram to Nizamuddin, both trains are hauled by an Electric Loco Shed,-based WAP-7 electric locomotive until Hazrat Nizamuddin and vice versa.
