= Thiruvananthapuram–Hazrat Nizamuddin Express (via Kottayam) =

Passenger train in India

Thiruvananthapuram Central–Hazrat Nizamuddin Superfast Express
Overview
- Service type: Express
- First service: 14 February 2015; 11 years ago
- Current operator: Southern Railways

Route
- Termini: Thiruvananthapuram Central (TVC); Hazrat Nizamuddin (NZM)
- Stops: 26
- Distance travelled: 2,857 km (1,775 mi)
- Average journey time: 46 hours and 10 min
- Service frequency: Weekly
- Train number: 22653 / 22654

On-board services
- Classes: AC 2 tier, AC 3 tier, Sleeper class, General Unreserved
- Seating arrangements: Yes
- Sleeping arrangements: Yes
- Catering facilities: No
- Observation facilities: Large windows
- Entertainment facilities: No
- Baggage facilities: Yes
- Other facilities: No

Technical
- Rolling stock: LHB coach
- Track gauge: 1,676 mm (5 ft 6 in)
- Electrification: Yes
- Operating speed: 110–130 km/h (68–81 mph),
Route map
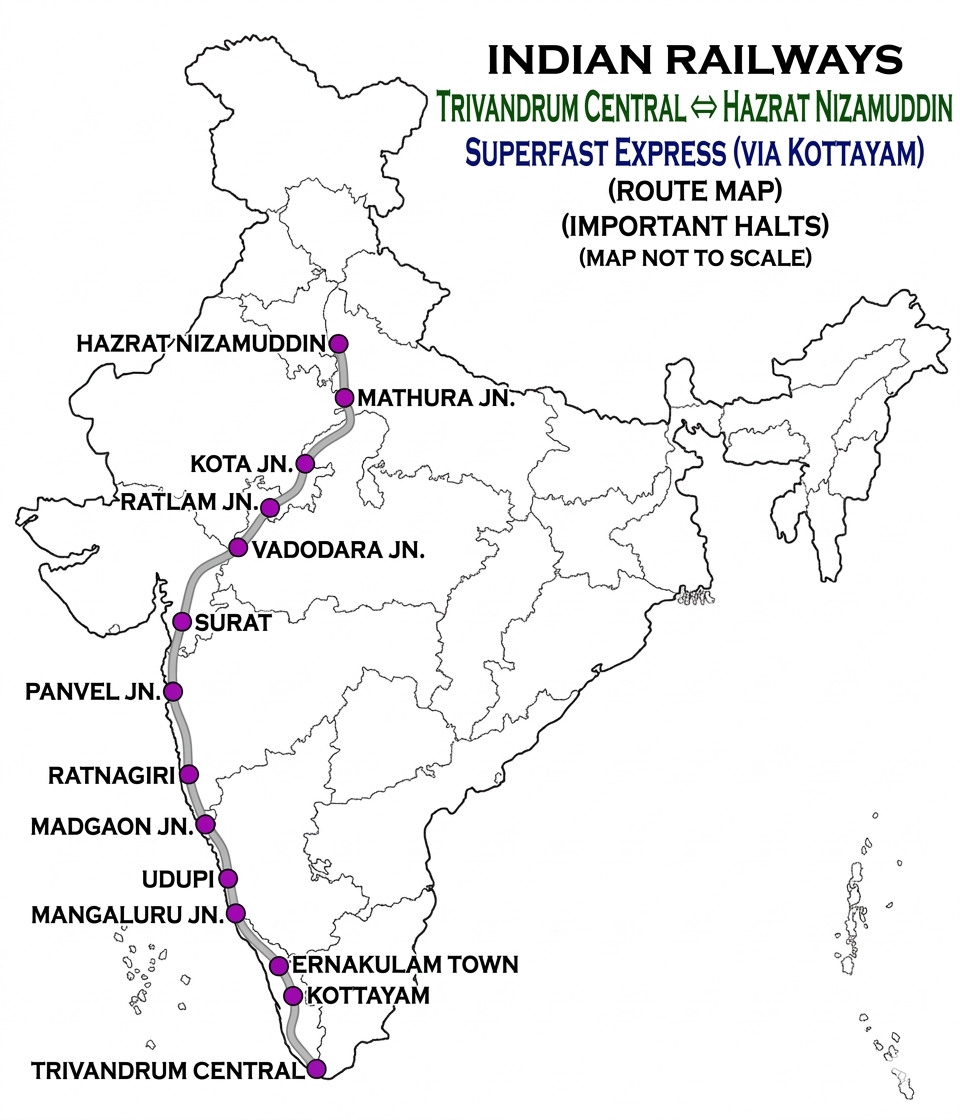

The 22653 /22654 Thiruvananthapuram Central–Hazrat Nizamuddin Superfast Express is an express train belonging to Indian Railways – Southern Railway zone that runs between Thiruvananthapuram Central and Hazrat Nizamuddin in India.

It operates as train number 22653 from Thiruvananthapuram Central to Hazrat Nizamuddin and as train number 22654 in the reverse direction, serving the states of Kerala, Karnataka, Goa, Maharashtra, Gujarat, Madhya Pradesh, Rajasthan, Uttar Pradesh, Haryana & Delhi.

== Coaches ==
The 22653 / 54 Thiruvananthapuram Central–Hazrat Nizamuddin Superfast Express has two AC 2 tier, six AC 3 tier, eight Sleeper class, four General Unreserved & two EOG (End on generation) coaches. It does not carry a pantry car.

Loco	EOG	GN	GN	A1	A2	B1	B2	B3	B4	B5	B6	S1	S2	S3	S4	S5	S6	S7	S8	D3	D4	EOG

== Service ==
22653/ Thiruvananthapuram Central–Hazrat Nizamuddin Superfast Express covers the distance of 3,163 km (1,965 mi) in 46 hours 10 mins (61 km/h) and in 47 hours 45 mins as 22654/Hazrat Nizamuddin–Thiruvananthapuram Central Superfast Express (59 km/h).

== Routing ==
The 22653 / 54 Thiruvananthapuram Central–Hazrat Nizamuddin Superfast Express runs from Thiruvananthapuram Central via Kollam Junction, Kottayam, Ernakulam Junction, Mangalore Junction, Madgaon Junction, Panvel, Vasai Road, Vadodara Junction, Kota Junction, Mathura Junction to Hazrat Nizamuddin.
