= Thiruvananthapuram North–Amritsar Weekly Express =

Thiruvananthapuram North-Amritsar Weekly Express
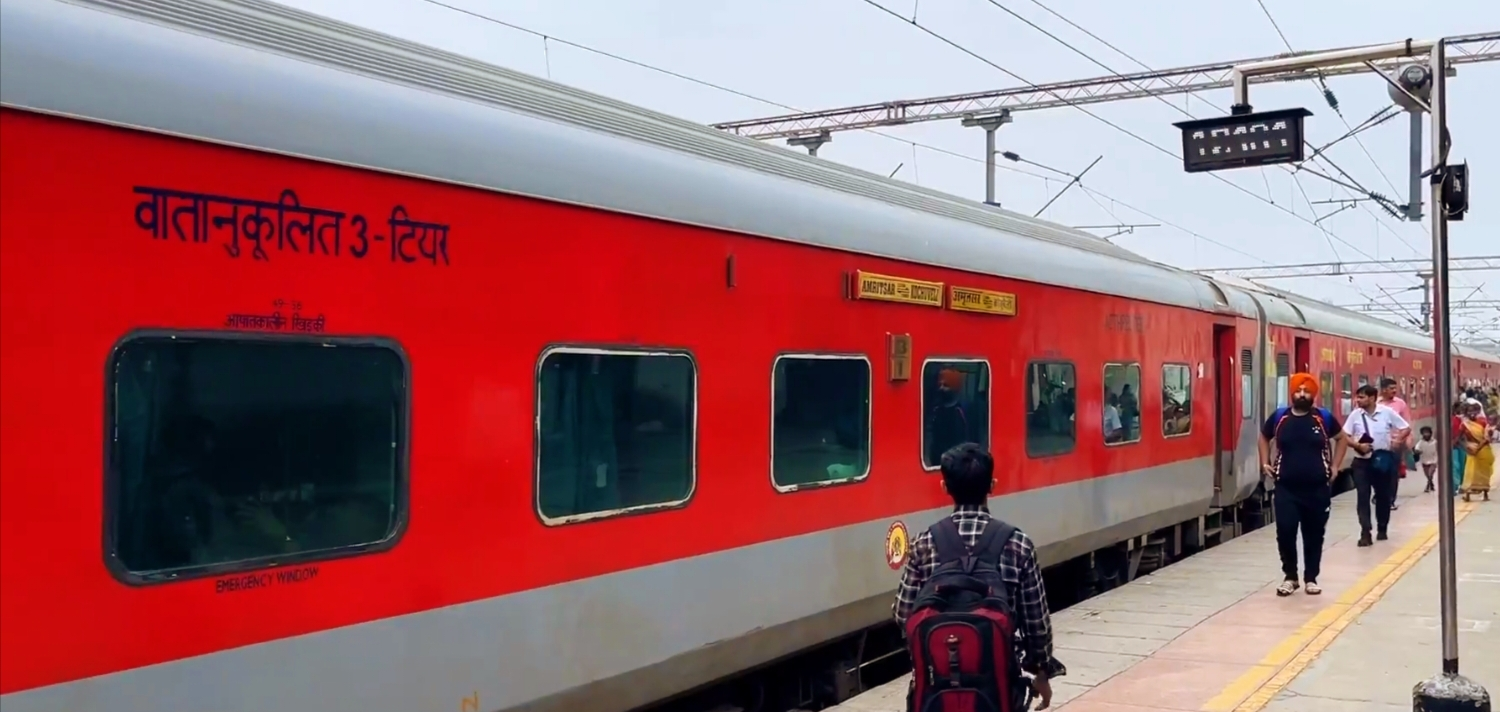
- Thiruvananthapuram North-Amritsar Weekly Express At Ludhiana Junction railway station

Overview
- Service type: Express
- Current operator: Northern Railway zone

Route
- Termini: Thiruvananthapuram North (TVCN); Amritsar Junction (ASR)
- Stops: 25
- Distance travelled: 3,597 km (2,235 mi)
- Average journey time: 52 hrs 35 mins as 12483 & 54 hrs 30 mins as 12484
- Service frequency: Weekly (Note: Runs one days in a week for every direction.)
- Train number: 12483/12484

On-board services
- Classes: AC 2 tier, AC 3 tier, Sleeper Class, General Unreserved
- Seating arrangements: YES
- Sleeping arrangements: Yes
- Auto-rack arrangements: YES
- Catering facilities: Yes
- Entertainment facilities: No
- Baggage facilities: Below the seats
- Other facilities: FAN & AIR CONDITIONERS

Technical
- Rolling stock: 2
- Track gauge: 1,676 mm (5 ft 6 in)
- Electrification: 7903 MEGAWATTS
- Operating speed: 60 km/h (37 mph)

The 12483 / 12484 Thiruvananthapuram North-Amritsar Weekly Superfast Express is a Superfast Express train of the Indian Railways connecting Thiruvananthapuram North in Kerala and Amritsar Junction of Punjab. It is currently being operated with 12483/12484 train numbers on a weekly basis. It is running with an LHB rake W.E.F. 9 June 2019. It is the second train after Kerala Sampark Kranti SF Express that connects Kerala with Punjab ( Amritsar ). From 11, July 2021 it runs with new time. As per the new timetable 12483 departs Thiruvananthapuram North at 09.15 hrs on every Wednesdays and reaches Amritsar at 13.50 hrs on every Fridays. In the return direction 12484 departs Amritsar at 05.55 hrs on every Sundays and reaches at Thiruvananthapuram North 12.25 hrs on every Tuesdays. During monsoon periods over Konkan route the travelling time will be changed. It is the Second Fastest train to Punjab from Kerala on weekly basis after Kerala Sampark Kranti SF Express .

== Service ==
The 12483/Thiruvananthapuram North - Amritsar Weekly SF Express has an average speed of 58 km/h and covers 3597 km in 52 hrs 35 mins. 12484/Amritsar - Thiruvananthapuram North Weekly SF Express has an average speed of 62 km/h and covers 3597 km in 54 hrs 30 mins.

== Timings and route ==
From 11 July 2021 it runs with new timings. Accordingly, 12483 Thiruvananthapuram North - Amritsar Superfast Express departs Kochuveli on every Wednesday at 09.15 hrs and reaches Amritsar at 13:50 hrs on every Fridays. During monsoon periods it departs Thiruvananthapuram North at 04.50 hrs on every Wednesdays and reaches Amritsar every Fridays at 13.50 hrs.

In return direction 12484 Amritsar - Thiruvananthapuram North departs Amritsar at 05:55 hrs on every Sunday and reaches Thiruvananthapuram North at 12:25 hrs on every Tuesdays. During monsoon periods (Over Konkan Railway) it departs Amritsar at 05.55 on every Sundays and reaches Thiruvananthapuram North at 14.30 hrs on every Tuesdays.

== Coach composite ==
The train has a modern LHB rake with an MPS of 130 km/h. The train consists of 21 coaches :

- 1 AC I Tier
- 2 AC II Tier
- 6 AC III Tier
- 7 Sleeper Class
- 4 General Unreserved
- 2 End On Generator Cars (EOG)
