= Ernakulam–Hazrat Nizamuddin Express =

Passenger train in India

Ernakulam Junction–Hazrat Nizamuddin Superfast Express
Overview
- Service type: Express
- First service: 11 February 2015; 11 years ago
- Current operator: Southern Railways

Route
- Termini: Ernakulam Junction (ERS); Hazrat Nizamuddin (NZM)
- Stops: 22
- Distance travelled: 3,149 km (1,957 mi)
- Average journey time: 44 hours 25 minutes
- Service frequency: Weekly
- Train number: 22655 / 22656

On-board services
- Classes: AC 2 tier, AC 3 tier, AC Economy, Sleeper class, General Unreserved
- Seating arrangements: Yes
- Sleeping arrangements: Yes
- Catering facilities: No
- Other facilities: Below the seats

Technical
- Rolling stock: LHB coach
- Track gauge: 1,676 mm (5 ft 6 in)
- Operating speed: 60 km/h (37 mph), including halts
Route map
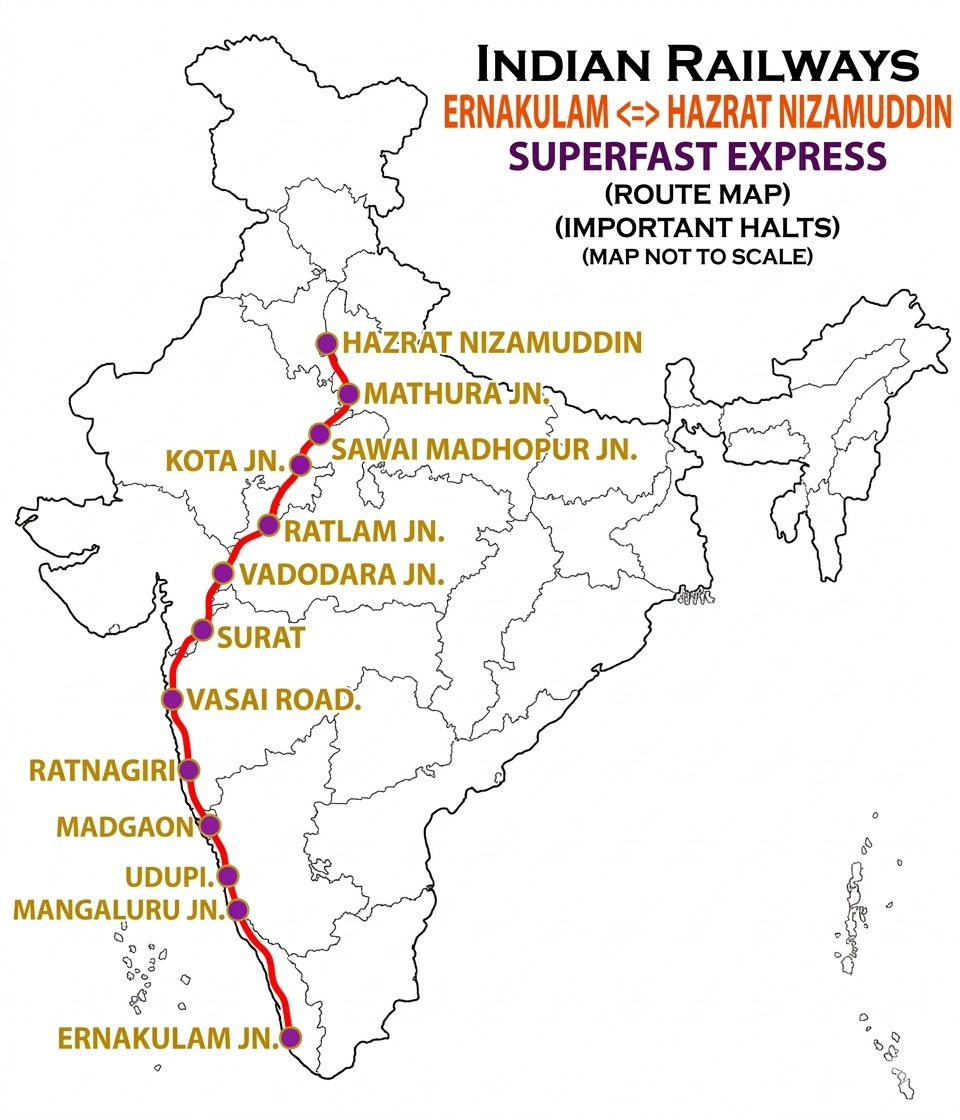

The 22655 / 22656 Ernakulam Junction–Hazrat Nizamuddin Superfast Express is an express Express train belonging to Indian Railways – Southern Railway zone that runs between Ernakulam Junction and Hazrat Nizamuddin in India. It was announced in 2014–15 Railway budget.

It operates as train number 22655 from Ernakulam Junction to Hazrat Nizamuddin and as train number 22656 in the reverse direction, serving the states of Kerala, Karnataka, Goa, Maharashtra, Gujarat, Madhya Pradesh, Rajasthan, Uttar Pradesh, Haryana & Delhi.

Earlier it used to run as TVC-NZM Express but later, TVC-ERS was cut off.

== Coaches ==
The 22655 / 56 Ernakulam Junction–Hazrat Nizamuddin Superfast Express has two AC 2 tier, five AC 3 tier, four Sleeper class, seven AC Economy class, two General Class and two EOG coaches. It does not carry a pantry car.

As is customary with most train services in India, coach composition may be amended at the discretion of Indian Railways depending on demand.

== Service ==
22655 Ernakulam Junction–Hazrat Nizamuddin Superfast Express covers the distance of 2,638 km (1,639 mi) in 44 hours 25 mins (60 km/h) and in 45 hours 35 mins as 22656 Hazrat Nizamuddin–Ernakulam Junction Superfast Express (58 km/h).

== Routeing ==
The 22655 / 56 Ernakulam Junction–Hazrat Nizamuddin Superfast Express runs from Shoranur Junction, Mangalore Junction, Madgaon Junction, Panvel, Vasai Road, Vadodara Junction, Kota Junction, Mathura Junction to Hazrat Nizamuddin.
