= Yesvantpur–Chandigarh Karnataka Sampark Kranti Express =

Train in India

Yesvantpur-Chandigarh Karnataka Sampark Kranti Express
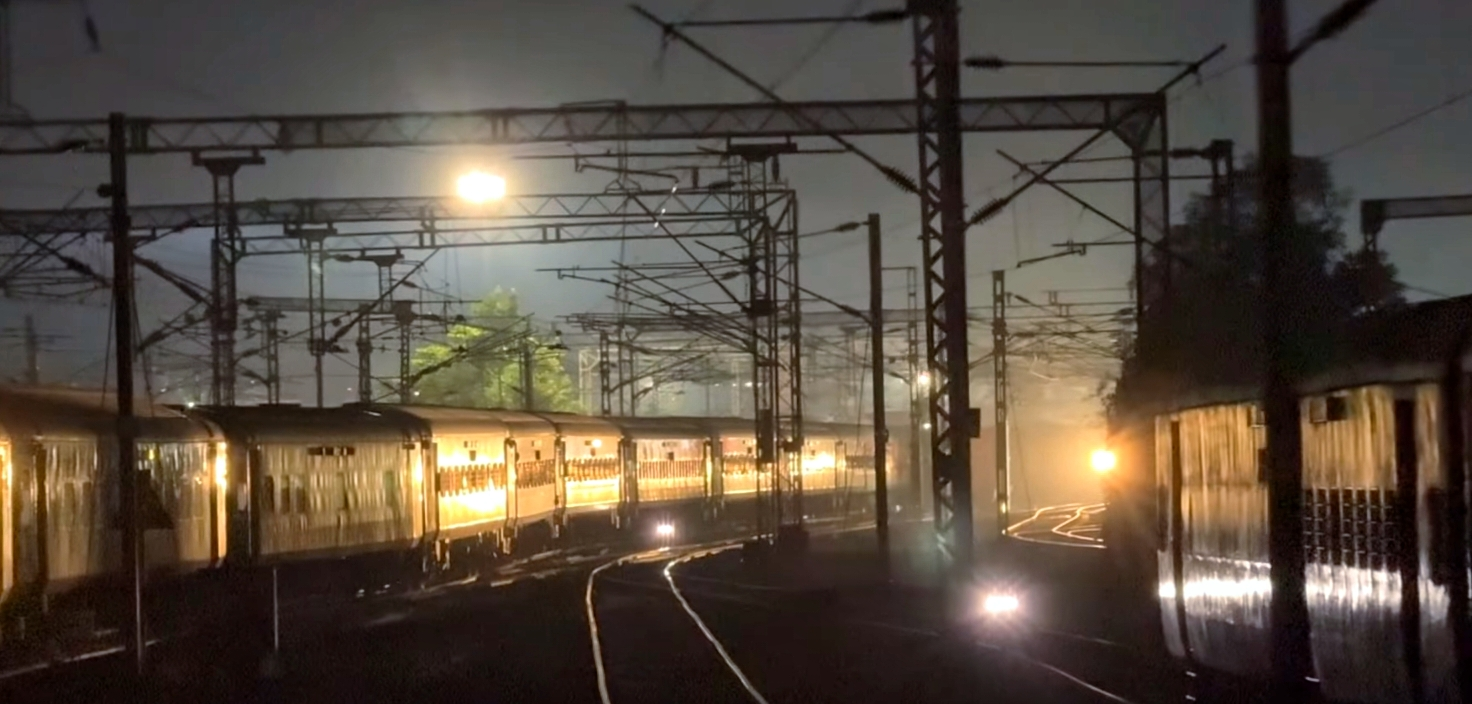
- Karnataka Sampark Kranti Express At Outer of Itarsi Junction

Overview
- Service type: Sampark Kranti Express
- First service: 22 January 2014; 12 years ago
- Current operator: South Western Railway

Route
- Termini: Yesvantpur Junction (YPR); Chandigarh Junction (CDG)
- Stops: 12
- Distance travelled: 2,865 km (1,780 mi)
- Average journey time: 49 hrs 35 mins
- Service frequency: Bi-weekly (Note: Runs two days in a week for every direction.)
- Train number: 22685 / 22686

On-board services
- Classes: AC First Class, AC 2 Tier, AC 3 Tier, Sleeper Class, General Unreserved
- Seating arrangements: Yes
- Sleeping arrangements: Yes
- Catering facilities: On-board catering, E-catering
- Observation facilities: Large windows
- Baggage facilities: Available
- Other facilities: Below the seats

Technical
- Rolling stock: LHB coach
- Track gauge: 1,676 mm (5 ft 6 in)
- Operating speed: 58 km/h (36 mph) average including halts.

The 22685 / 22686 Yesvantpur–Chandigarh Karnataka Sampark Kranti Express is a Sampark Kranti class rain belonging to South Western Railway zone that runs between Yesvantpur Junction and Chandigarh Junction in India. It is currently being operated with 22686/22685 train numbers on a bi-weekly basis.

== Service ==
- The 22685/Chandigarh–Yesvantapur Karnataka Sampark Kranti Express has an average speed of 57 km/h and covers 2861 km in 49 hrs 50 min
- The 22686/Yesvantpur–Chandigarh Karnataka Sampark Kranti Express has an average speed of 58 km/h and covers 2861 km in 49 hrs 20 min.

== Route and halts ==
The important halts of the train are:

- Yesvantpur Junction
- Hubballi Junction
- Dharwad
- Belgaum
- Miraj Junction
- Sangli
- Pune Junction
- Daund Junction
- Manmad Junction
- Bhopal Junction
- New Delhi
- Ambala Cantonment Junction
- Chandigarh Junction

== Coach composition ==
earlier was ICF rakes now The train has new LHB rakes with a maximum speed of 130 km/h. The train consists of 22 coaches:

- 1 First AC
- 2 AC II Tier
- 4 AC III Tier
- 8 Sleeper Coaches
- 1 Pantry Car
- 4 General Unreserved
- 2 Seating cum Luggage Rake Car

== Traction ==
before electrified route stretch this train used to run with WDP-4 and now The train is hauled by a Krishnarajapuram Loco Shed based WAP-7 electric locomotive from end to end journey.

== Rake sharing ==
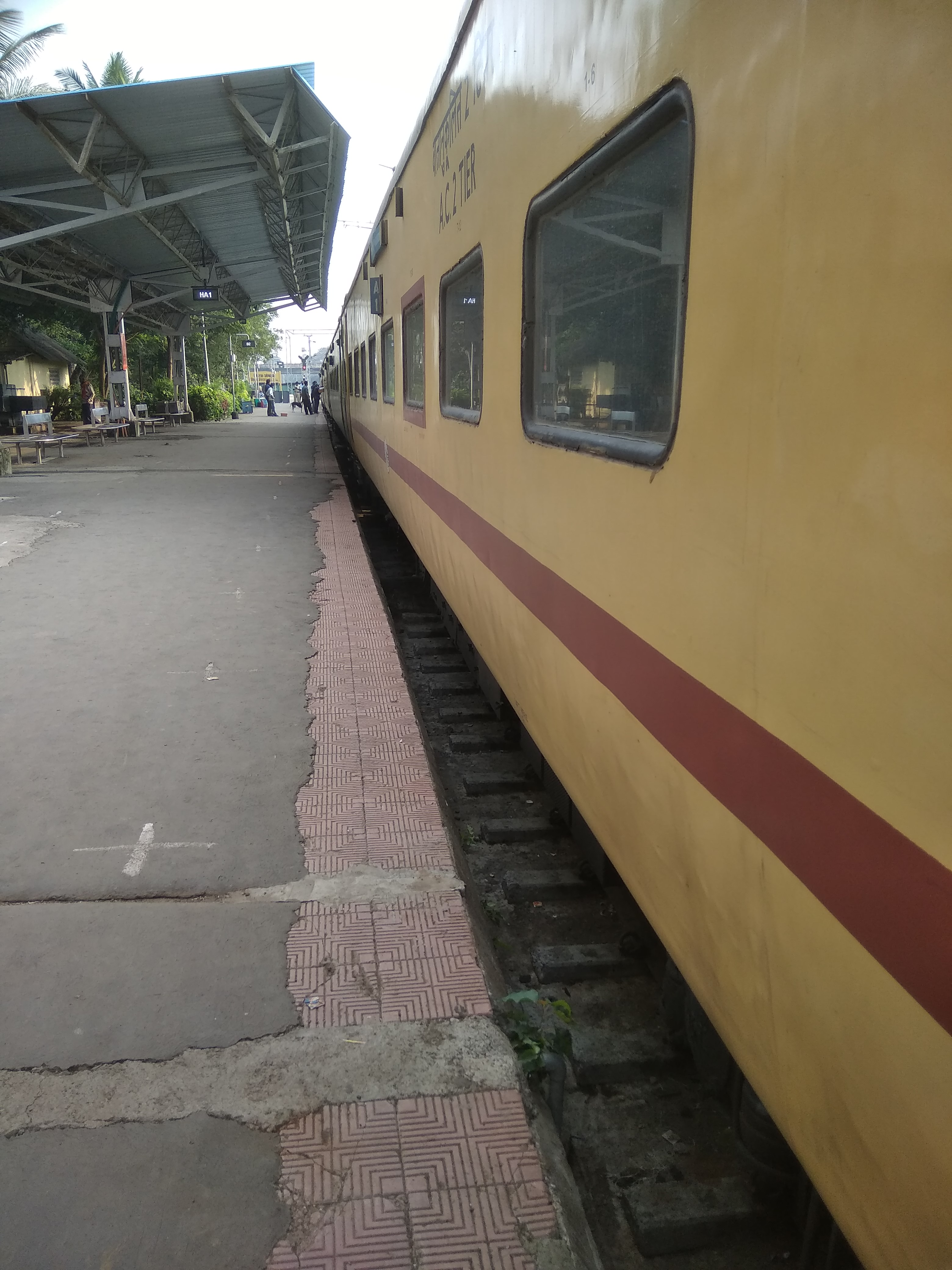
Chandigarh–Yesvantapur Sampark Kranti Express standing at Miraj Junction

The train shares its rake with 16541/16542 Yesvantpur–Pandharpur Express.

== Direction reversal ==
The train reverses its direction at Pune Junction

== See also ==
- Chandigarh Junction railway station
- Yesvantpur Junction railway station
- Karnataka Sampark Kranti Express
- Karnataka Sampark Kranti Express (via Hubballi)
