= Karnataka Sampark Kranti Express =

Karnataka Sampark Kranti Express may refer to:

- Karnataka Sampark Kranti Express (via Pune)
- Karnataka Sampark Kranti Express (via Ballari)
- Yesvantpur–Chandigarh Karnataka Sampark Kranti Express
