= Gorakhpur–Yesvantpur Express (via Faizabad) =

Gorakhpur–Yesvantpur Express (via Ayodhya)
Overview
- Service type: Express
- Current operator: North Eastern Railway zone

Route
- Termini: Gorakhpur Junction (GKP); Yesvantpur Junction (YPR)
- Stops: 23
- Distance travelled: 2,471 km (1,535 mi)
- Average journey time: 50h 15min
- Service frequency: Weekly (Note: Runs one day in a week for every direction.)
- Train number: 15023/15024

On-board services
- Classes: AC 2 tier, AC 3 tier, Sleeper Class, General Unreserved
- Seating arrangements: No
- Sleeping arrangements: Yes
- Catering facilities: On-board catering E-catering
- Observation facilities: LHB coach
- Entertainment facilities: No
- Baggage facilities: No
- Other facilities: Below the seats

Technical
- Rolling stock: 2
- Track gauge: 1,676 mm (5 ft 6 in)
- Operating speed: 53 km/h (33 mph), including halts
Route map
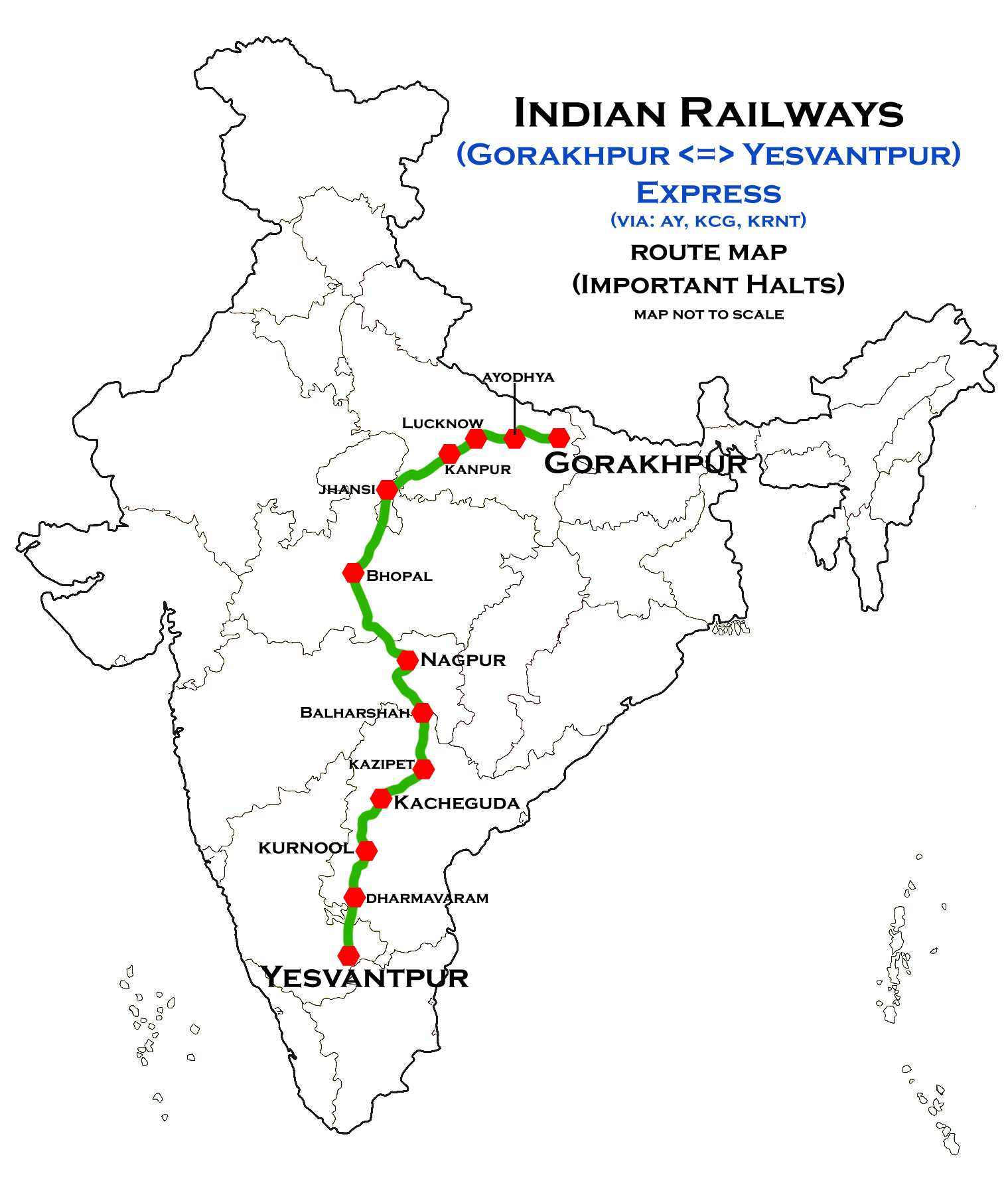

The Gorakhpur–Yesvantpur Express is an Express train belonging to North Eastern Railway zone that runs between Gorakhpur Junction and Yesvantpur Junction via Ayodhya Junction in India. It is currently being operated with 15023/15024 train numbers on a weekly basis.

== Service ==
The 15023/Gorakhpur– Yesvantpur Express has an average speed of 49 km/h and covers 2464 km in 50h 30m. The 15024/Yesvantpur–Gorakhpur Express has an average speed of 56 km/h and covers 2464 km in 43h 50m.

== Route and halts ==
The important halts of the train are:

- Gorakhpur Junction
- Basti
- Mankapur Junction
- Ayodhya Junction
- Lucknow Charbagh
- Kanpur Central
- Orai
- Jhansi Junction
- Bina Junction
- Bhopal Junction
- Itarsi Junction
- Nagpur Junction
- Chandrapur
- Balharshah Junction
- Sirpur Kaghaznagar
- Kazipet Junction
- Kacheguda
- Mahbubnagar
- Kurnool City
- Anantapur
- Dharmavaram Junction
- Yesvantpur Junction

== Coach composition ==
The train has standard LHB rakes with a maximum speed of 130 km/h. The train consists of 22 coaches:

- 3 AC II Tier
- 6 AC III Tier
- 7 Sleeper Coaches
- 4 General Unreserved
- 2 End-on Generator

ENG-GEN-UNZ-UNZ-SLR-SLR-SLR-AC2-AC2-AC2-AC3-AC3-AC3-AC3-AC3-AC3-SLR-SLR-SLR-UNZ-UNZ-

GEN

== Traction ==
Both trains are hauled by a Jhansi-based WDM-3A or WDP-4D diesel locomotive from Gorakhpur to Jhansi. From Jhansi, the trains are hauled by a Lallaguda-based WAP-7 electric locomotive until Kacheguda. From Kacheguda, the trains are hauled by a Kazipet-based twin WDM-3A diesel locomotive until Yesvantpur and vice versa.

== See also ==
- Yesvantpur Junction railway station
- Gorakhpur Junction railway station
- Gorakhpur–Yesvantpur Express (via Gonda)
- Gorakhpur–Yesvantpur Express
