= Gorakhpur–Yesvantpur Express (via Gonda) =

Express train

Gorakhpur–Yesvantpur Express (via Basti, Gonda)
Overview
- Service type: Express
- Current operator: North Eastern Railway zone

Route
- Termini: Gorakhpur Junction (GKP); Yesvantpur Junction (YPR)
- Stops: 23
- Distance travelled: 2,521 km (1,566 mi)
- Average journey time: 51h 0m
- Service frequency: Weekly (Note: Runs one day in a week for every direction.)
- Train number: 15015/15016

On-board services
- Classes: AC 2 tier, AC 3 tier, Sleeper Class, General Unreserved
- Seating arrangements: No
- Sleeping arrangements: Yes
- Catering facilities: On-board catering E-catering
- Observation facilities: LHB coach
- Entertainment facilities: No
- Baggage facilities: No
- Other facilities: Below the seats

Technical
- Rolling stock: 2
- Track gauge: Broad gauge 1,676 mm (5 ft 6 in)
- Operating speed: 54 km/h (34 mph), including halts
Route map
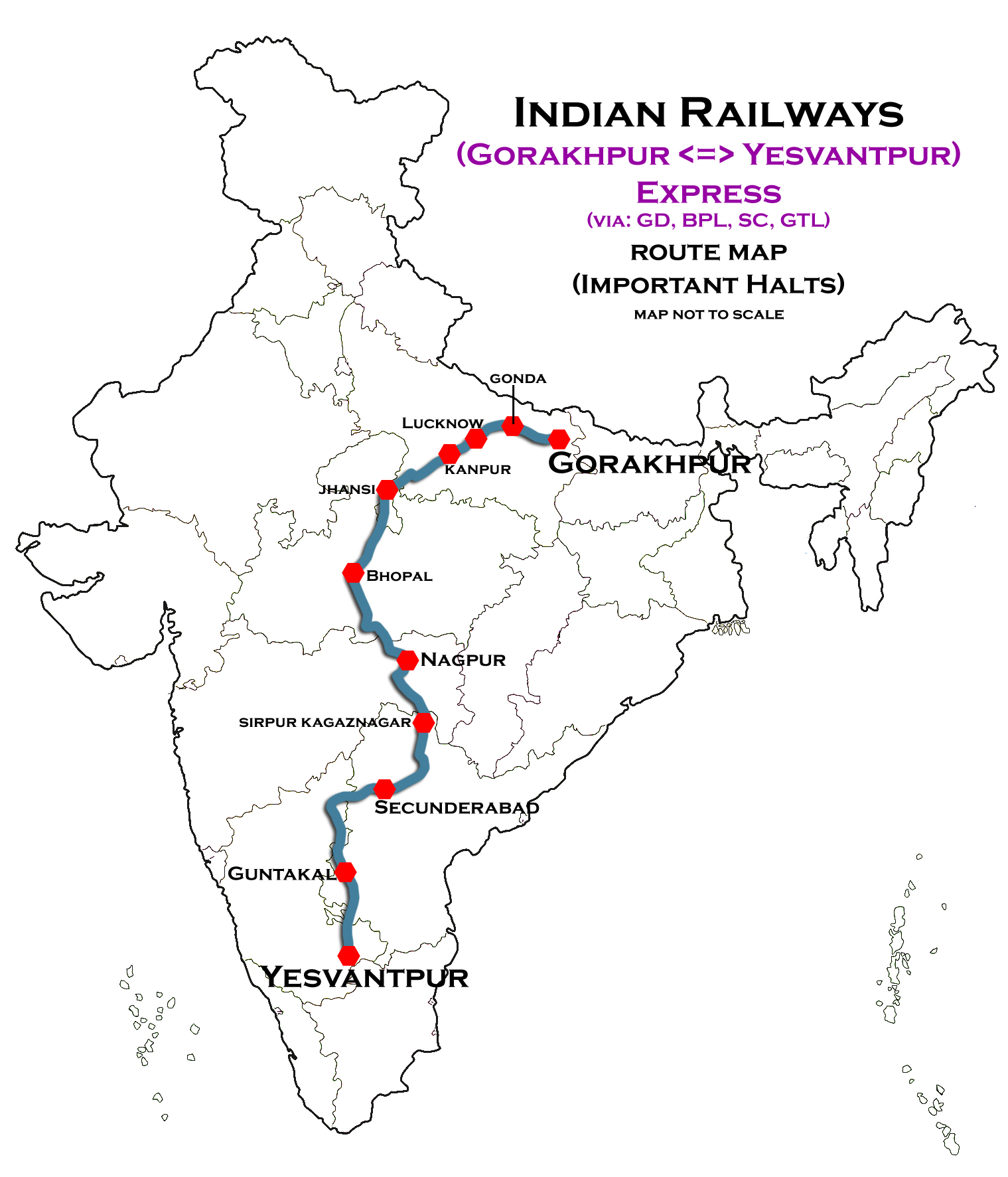

The Gorakhpur–Yesvantpur Express is an express train belonging to North Eastern Railway zone that runs between Gorakhpur Junction and Yesvantpur Junction via Basti railway station and Gonda Junction in India. It is currently being operated with 15015/15016 train numbers on a weekly basis.

== Service ==
The 15015/Gorakhpur–Yesvantpur Express has an average speed of 49 km/h and covers 2515 km in 51h 10m. The 15016/Yesvantpur–Gorakhpur Express has an average speed of 47 km/h and covers 2515 km in 53 h 55 m.

== Route and halts ==
The important halts of the train are:

- Gorakhpur Junction
- Basti
- Gonda Junction
- Barabanki Junction
- Badshahnagar
- Aishbagh
- Unnao Junction
- Kanpur Central
- Orai
- Jhansi Junction
- Bina Junction
- Bhopal Junction
- Itarsi Junction
- Nagpur Junction
- Chandrapur
- Balharshah Junction
- Sirpur Kaghaznagar
- Kazipet Junction
- Secunderabad Junction
- Guntakal Junction
- Dharmavaram Junction
- Hindupur
- Yesvantpur Junction

== Coach composite ==
The train has standard LHB rakes with a maximum speed of 130 km/h. The train consists of 22 coaches:

- 3 AC II Tier
- 6 AC III Tier
- 7 Sleeper Coaches
- 4 General Unreserved
- 2 End-on Generator

== Traction ==
Both trains are hauled by a Lallaguda Loco Shed-based WAP-7 electric locomotive from Gorakhpur to Secunderabad. From Secunderabad, the trains are hauled by a Moula Al Loco Shed-based twin WDM-3A diesel locomotive until Yesvantpur and vice versa.

== Direction reversal ==
Earlier the train used to reverse its direction at Lucknow Junction. After the completion of the Manaknagar–Aishbagh bypass line, now the train bypasses Lucknow Junction.

== Notes ==
- 15015 - Leaves Gorakhpur Junction on Monday at 06:35 Hrs and reaches Yesvantpur Junction on 3rd day at 09:45 Hrs
- 15016 - Leaves Yesvantpur Junction on Thursday at 07:30 Hrs and reaches Gorakhpur Junction on 3rd day at 13:30 Hrs

== See also ==
- Yesvantpur Junction railway station
- Gorakhpur Junction railway station
- Gorakhpur–Yesvantpur Express (via Faizabad)
- Gorakhpur–Yesvantpur Express
