= Sampark Kranti Express =

Series of superfast express trains in India

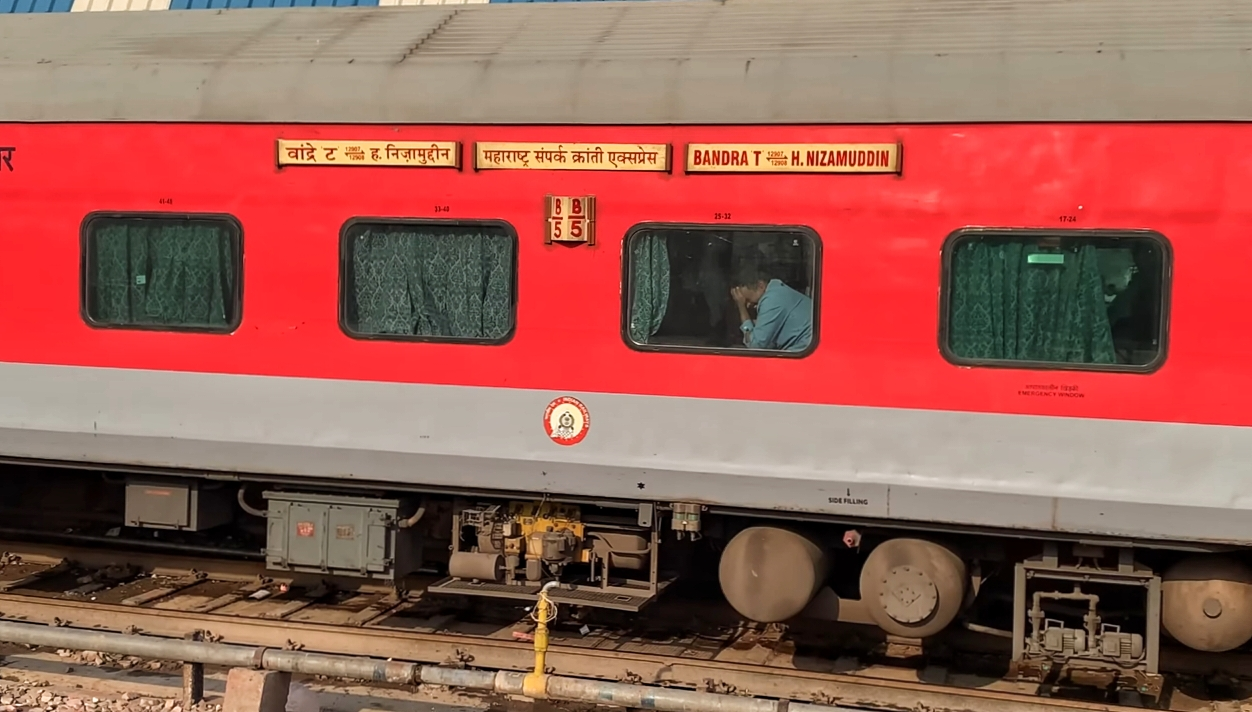
- Maharashtra Sampark Kranti Express At Mathura Junction

Overview
- Operator: Indian Railways
- Main Operation: Connects national capital / Chandigarh with state capitals / big cities
- Fleet: 23
- Stations called at: From various cities to New Delhi/Old Delhi/Chandigarh
- Dates of operation: 2004–present

Technical
- Track gauge: 1,676 mm (5 ft 6 in); Broad Gauge
- Operating speed: 130 km/h (81 mph) maximum

Sampark Kranti Express trains are a series of Superfast express trains operated by the Indian Railways providing quick connectivity to the national capital, New Delhi. Ekta Nagar Sampark Kranti is no more Sampark Kranti since August 2025. It is now converted in SF Express train.

== Overview ==
The words Sampark and Kranti are borrowed from Sanskrit. Sampark(Devanagari:-सम्पर्क) means Contact and Kranti(Devanagari:-क्रान्ति ) means Revolution. The combined name denotes the steps taken by Indian Railways to provide high speed train connections from cities around India with the National Capital through the provision of non-air conditioned express trains with few stops and operating at high speeds. A similar capability had been introduced earlier on the Rajdhani express. However, these trains were completely air-conditioned and hence quite expensive.

The Rajdhani and Shatabdi series are the fastest trains in India in terms of average journey speeds. The Sampark Kranti trains operate at slower average speeds than the Rajdhani and Shatabdi series yet still provide high speed options at normal prices due to their few stops and relatively faster speeds compared with other non-Rajdhani Express express trains and non-Shatabdi Express express trains although initially they ran non stop once they left their respective states. They don't provide any extra facilities than the other express trains only just a quick fast connection to the country's capital from the state.

The Railway Minister (India) at the time Nitish Kumar in the interim Railway Budget of 2004-05 announced the launch of Sampark Kranti Express. The trains in the Sampark Kranti series connect the Indian states to the national capital city of New Delhi. Sampark Kranti trains charge the same fare as regular/superfast trains on the Indian Railways rail network and do not provide any special facilities not available in regular Express trains. The initial decision of non-stop run of this Express series of trains was cut short and was given way to commercial stopping outside the states. The trains aim at reducing travel time without compromising on passenger comfort.

Initially eighteen trains were launched and the count was later increased. The Karnataka Sampark Kranti Express from Delhi Hazrat Nizamuddin to Yesvantpur was the first train which was launched on 8 February 2004. Uttar Pradesh Sampark Kranti Express link from Khajuraho got terminated with the introduction of Gita Jayanti Express and extension of the same to Khajuraho in Madhya Pradesh.

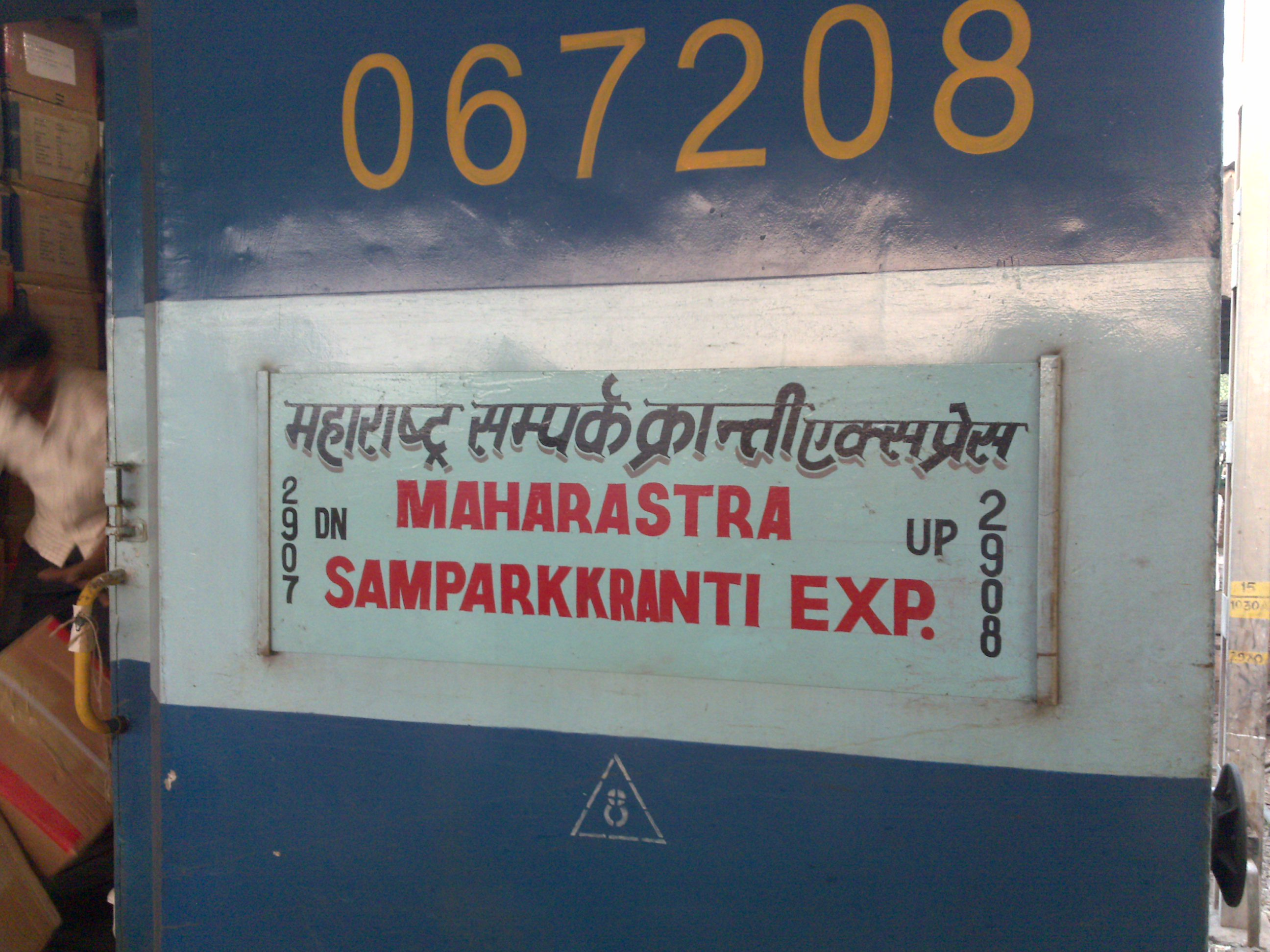
12908 Maharashtra Sampark Express

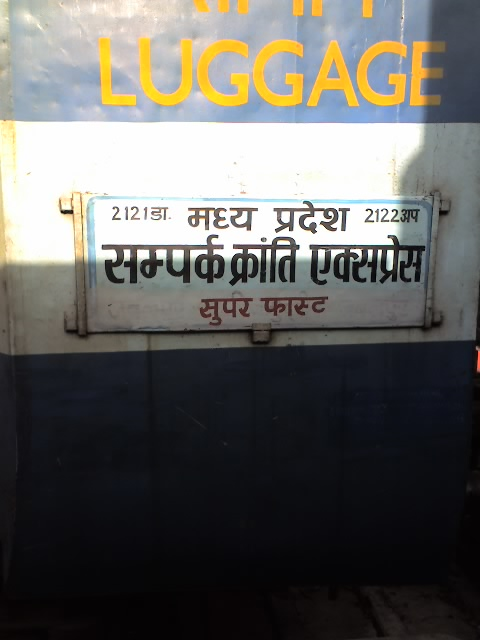
12121 M.P. Sampark Kranti Express

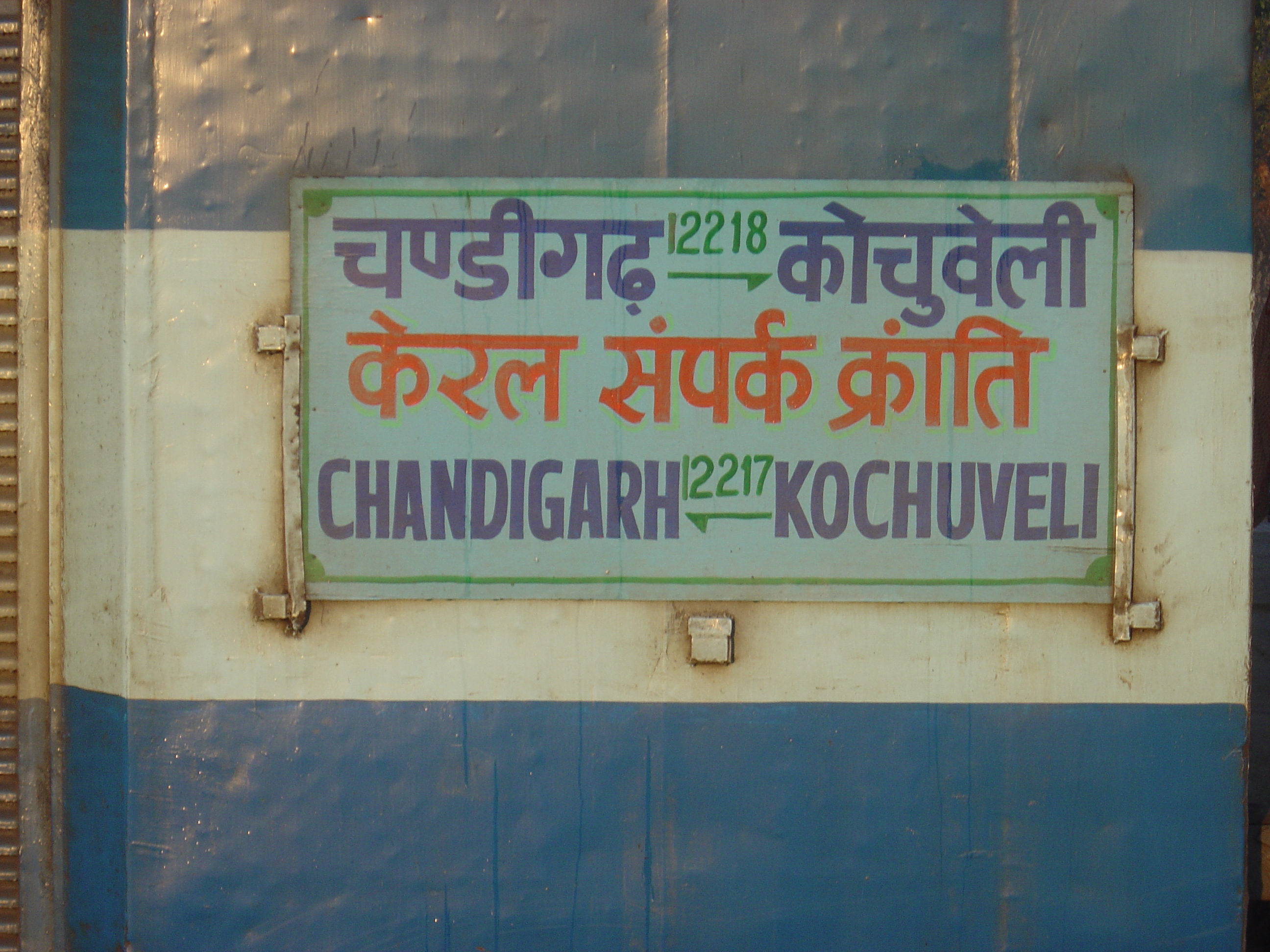
12217 Kerala Sampark Kranti Express

== Active services ==
| Sr. no. | Train name | Distance | Travel Time | Avg speed |
|---|---|---|---|---|
| 1 | Andhra Pradesh Sampark Kranti Express | 2302 | 36 h 15 m | 58 km/h |
| 2 | Bihar Sampark Kranti Express | 1172 | 20 h 40 m | 56 km/h |
| 3 | Chhattisgarh Sampark Kranti Express | 1281 | 21 h 20 m | 61 km/h |
| 4 | Goa Sampark Kranti Express | 2160 | 36 h 40 m | 65 km/h |
| 5 | Gujarat Sampark Kranti Express | 1085 | 17 h 50 m | 75 km/h |
| 7 | Jharkhand Sampark Kranti Express | 1306 | 19 h 40 m | 61 km/h |
| 8 | Karnataka Sampark Kranti Express (via Ballari) | 2279 | 35 h 00 m | 63 km/h |
| 9 | Karnataka Sampark Kranti Express (via Hubballi) | 2614 | 46 h 00 m | 55 km/h |
| 10 | Karnataka Sampark Kranti Express (to Chandigarh) | 2865 | 49 h 30 m | 57 km/h |
| 11 | Kerala Sampark Kranti Express | 3465 | 48 h 40 m | 61 km/h |
| 12 | Madhya Pradesh Sampark Kranti Express | 909 | 12 h 10 m | 65 km/h |
| 13 | Maharashtra Sampark Kranti Express | 1366 | 16 h 45 m | 81 km/h |
| 14 | Marathwada Sampark Kranti Express | 1633 | 29 h 00 m | 63 km/h |
| 15 | Odisha Sampark Kranti Express | 1799 | 27 h 55 m | 62 km/h |
| 16 | Poorvottar Sampark Kranti Express | 1904 | 30 h 45 m | 59 km/h |
| 17 | Poorvottar Sampark Kranti Express (Silchar) | 2305 | 41 h 50 m | 52 km/h |
| 18 | Rajasthan Sampark Kranti Express | 685 | 10 h 00 m | 62.5 km/h |
| 19 | Tamil Nadu Sampark Kranti Express | 2677 | 42 h 00 m | 63 km/h |
| 20 | Uttar Pradesh Sampark Kranti Express | 695 | 12 h 25 m | 61 km/h |
| 21 | Uttar Sampark Kranti Express | 655 | 11 h 05 m | 59 km/h |
| 22 | Uttaranchal Sampark Kranti Express | 277 | 6 h 45 m | 41 km/h |
| 23 | Uttarakhand Sampark Kranti Express Slip | 238 | 4 h 55 m | 48 km/h |
| 24 | West Bengal Sampark Kranti Express | 1448 | 19 h 40 m | 72 km/h |

== See also ==
- Express trains in India
- High-speed rail in India
- Rajdhani Express
- Shatabdi Express
- Duronto Express
