= Gujarat Sampark Kranti Express =

Train in India

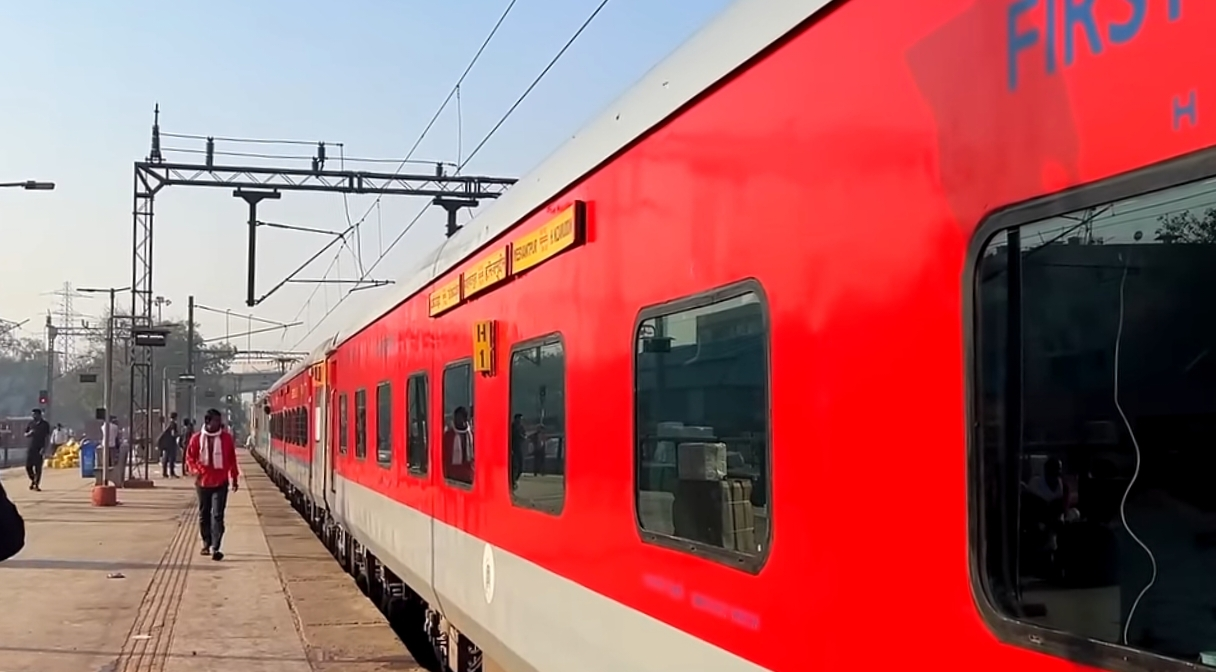
- Gujarat Sampark Kranti Express At Mathura Junction railway station

Overview
- Service type: Sampark Kranti Express
- Locale: Gujarat, Madhya Pradesh, Rajasthan, Uttar Pradesh, Haryana & Delhi
- First service: 12 March 2005; 21 years ago
- Current operator: Western Railway

Route
- Termini: Ahmedabad Junction (ADI); Hazrat Nizamuddin (NZM)
- Stops: 8
- Distance travelled: 1,074 km (667 mi)
- Average journey time: 17 hours 50 minutes
- Service frequency: Weekly
- Train number: 12917 / 12918

On-board services
- Classes: AC 1st class; AC 2 Tier; AC 3 Tier; Sleeper class; General class
- Seating arrangements: Yes
- Sleeping arrangements: Yes
- Catering facilities: Available
- Observation facilities: Large windows
- Baggage facilities: Available

Technical
- Rolling stock: LHB coach
- Track gauge: 1,676 mm (5 ft 6 in)
- Operating speed: 62 km/h (39 mph) average including halts
Route map
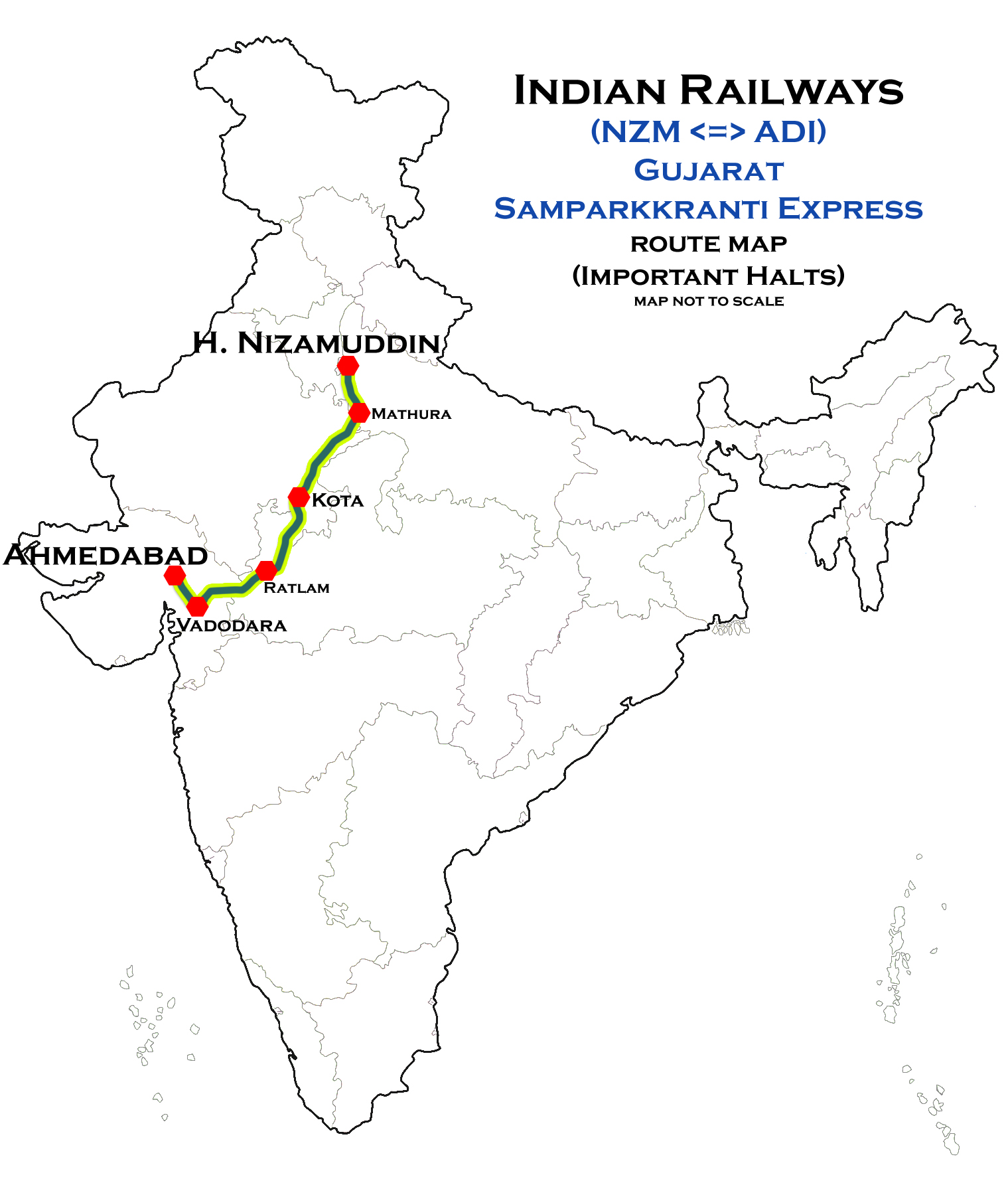
- Gujarat Samparkkranti Express (NZM–ADI) route map

The 12917 / 12918 Gujarat Sampark Kranti Express is one of the Sampark Kranti Expresses, a train on India's broad-gauge network, connecting Ahmedabad (code: ADI) and Delhi Hazrat Nizamuddin (code: NZM), a distance of approximately 1085 km. The train runs on Indian Railways broad-gauge track network and was introduced in 2008 to provide quicker connectivity from India's capital New Delhi to locations in Gujarat.

== Schedule ==
The Gujarat Sampark Kranti Express runs three days a week. As of 1 November 2009, 2917 departs ADI every Monday, Wednesday and Friday at 1720 and arrives at NZM at 1040 on Tuesday, Thursday and Saturday, averaging 65 km/h speed during its run. 2918 departs NZM every Tuesday, Thursday and Saturday at 1355 and arrives at ADI at 610 on Wednesday, Friday and Sunday, averaging 69 km/h speed. In its journey, the train passes through the Indian states of Gujarat, Madhya Pradesh, Rajasthan, Uttar Pradesh, Haryana and Delhi. Some cities where the Gujarat Sampark Kranti Express halts en route are Nadiad, Chhayapuri (Vadodara), Godhra, Dahod, Ratlam, Kota and Mathura. The entire route of the train is on double-line electrified track section of Indian Railways.

== Route and halts ==
- Ahmedabad Junction
- Nadiad
- Anand
- Chhayapuri (Vadodara)
- Godhra
- Dahod
- Ratlam
- Kota
- Mathura
- Hazrat Nizamuddin

== Coaches and rake ==
The train's rake is split into at least three classes of reserved travel: AC 2 Tier (code: A/2A), AC 3 Tier (code:B/3A) and non air-conditioned reserved sleeper (SL). As it is a Sampark Kranti train, between 2 and 6 carriages requiring no previous travel reservation (code: General) are included.

== Rake sharing ==
No Rake sharing.

== Traction ==
Earlier it was hauled by a Ghaziabad Loco Shed-based WAP-5 electric locomotive. Now both trains are hauled by a Vadodara Loco Shed-based WAP-7 electric locomotive on its entire journey.

== Other details ==
The passenger fare between ADI and NZM varies from INR (Indian rupee) 1400 (A/2A) to INR 190 (General). Though its route is 150 km longer than the Ashram Express, the Gujarat Sampark Kranti averages a higher speed and takes 15 minutes less than the Ashram Express to travel from Delhi to Ahmedabad. This is attributable to the fact that the Samprak Kranti Express gets the benefit of electric traction, double-line track and almost no stops outside Gujarat on its entire route. Gujarat Sampark Kranti Express is designated as a Superfast train, which denotes that it gets priority over local (commuter) trains, standard express and passenger trains and most freight trains.

== See also ==
- Indian Railways
