= Maharashtra Sampark Kranti Express =

Train in India

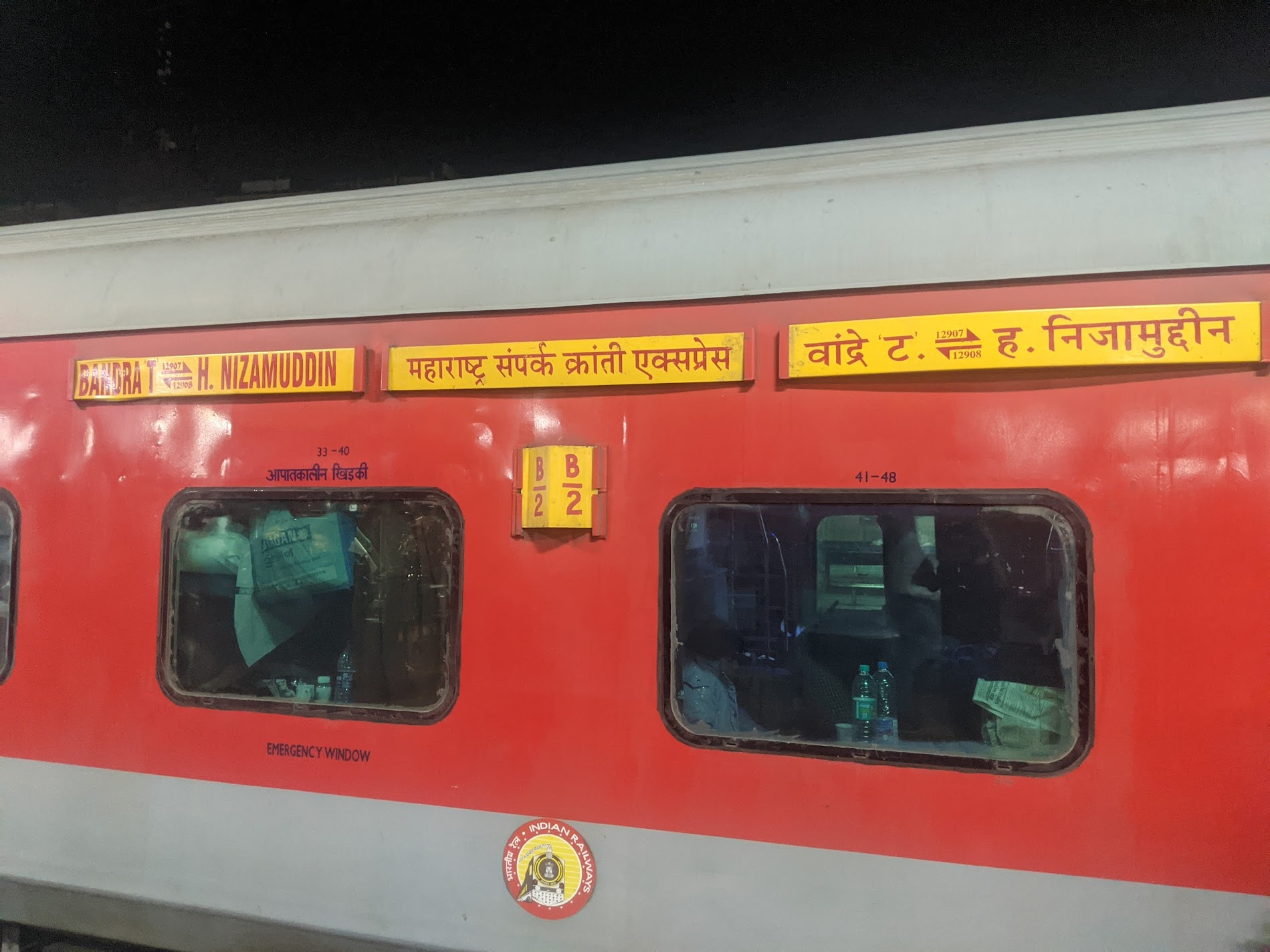
- Maharashtra Sampark Kranti Express At Bharatpur Junction railway station

Overview
- Service type: Sampark Kranti Express
- Locale: Maharashtra, Gujarat, Madhya Pradesh, Rajasthan, Uttar Pradesh, Haryana & Delhi
- First service: 4 November 2004; 21 years ago
- Current operator: Western Railways

Route
- Termini: Bandra Terminus (BDTS); Hazrat Nizamuddin (NZM)
- Stops: 6
- Distance travelled: 1,367 km (849 mi)
- Average journey time: 16 hours 45 minutes
- Service frequency: Bi-weekly
- Train number: 12907 / 12908

On-board services
- Classes: AC First Class Class; AC 2 Tier; AC 3 Tier; Sleeper Class; General Unreserved
- Seating arrangements: Yes
- Sleeping arrangements: Yes
- Catering facilities: Available
- Observation facilities: Large windows
- Baggage facilities: Available
- Other facilities: Below the seats

Technical
- Rolling stock: LHB coach
- Track gauge: 1,676 mm (5 ft 6 in)
- Operating speed: 81 km/h (50 mph) average including halts.
Route map
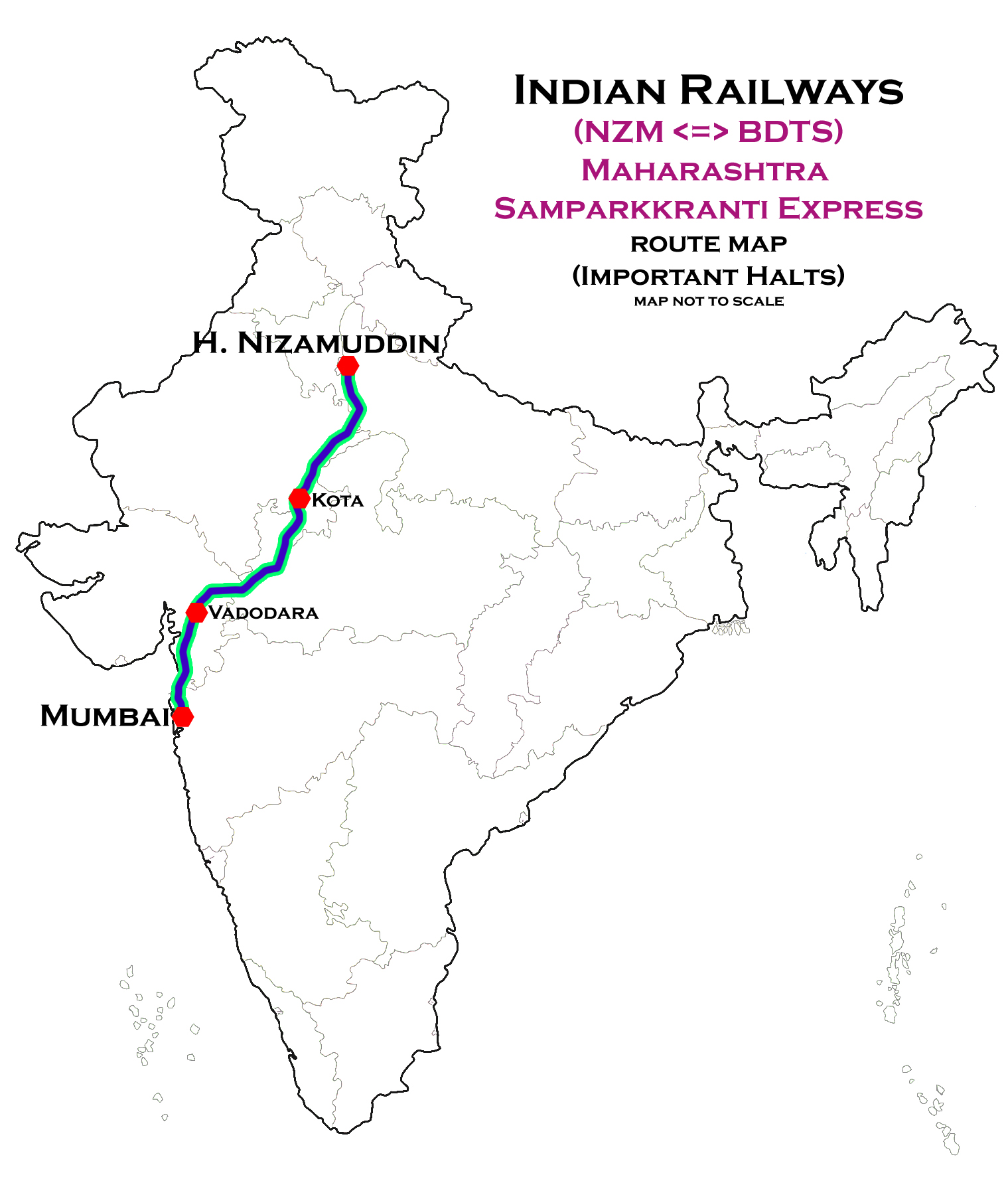
↓ 12907 • 12908 ↑

The 12907 / 12908 Maharashtra Sampark Kranti Express is a Sampark Kranti Superfast Express train that operates between Bandra Terminus in Mumbai and Hazrat Nizamuddin in Delhi, India.

It is the fastest non premium train of Indian Railways with average speeds competing with many Rajdhani trains.

== Background ==
This train was introduced as one of the Sampark Kranti trains announced by the then-Railway Minister Nitish Kumar in the 2004/2005 rail budget. It originally departed from Bandra Terminus and, after a stop at Borivali, ran non-stop to Hazrat Nizamuddin, except for operational halts. Due to low ridership, the operational stops were changed to commercial stops. It now also halts at Vadodara Junction , Ratlam Junction and Kota Junction for crew changes. It formerly used ICF coach cars, but has used LHB rakes cars since 15 January 2017.

== Coach composition ==
The train uses standard LHB rakes cars and has a maximum speed of 130 km/h. The train consists of 22 coaches:

- 1 AC I Tier
- 2 AC II Tier
- 6 AC III Tier
- 8 Sleeper coaches + SLR
- 1 Pantry car
- 3 General
- 1 End-on Generator

== Stoppage ==
- Bandra Terminus
- Borivali
- Surat
- Vadodara Junction
- Ratlam Junction
- Kota Junction
- Hazrat Nizamuddin

== Traction ==
As the Western Railway has switched to AC traction, Vadodara Junction is now an operational halt. It is hauled end-to-end by an Vadodara-based WAP-7 (HOG) equipped locomotive.

From April 2018, bio toilets were installed in this train. In August 2016, along with a few other trains, this train was selected to run advertisements on the coaches.

The train was temporarily halted during COVID19 and was restarted in January 2022.
