= Karnataka Sampark Kranti Express (via Ballari) =

Train in India

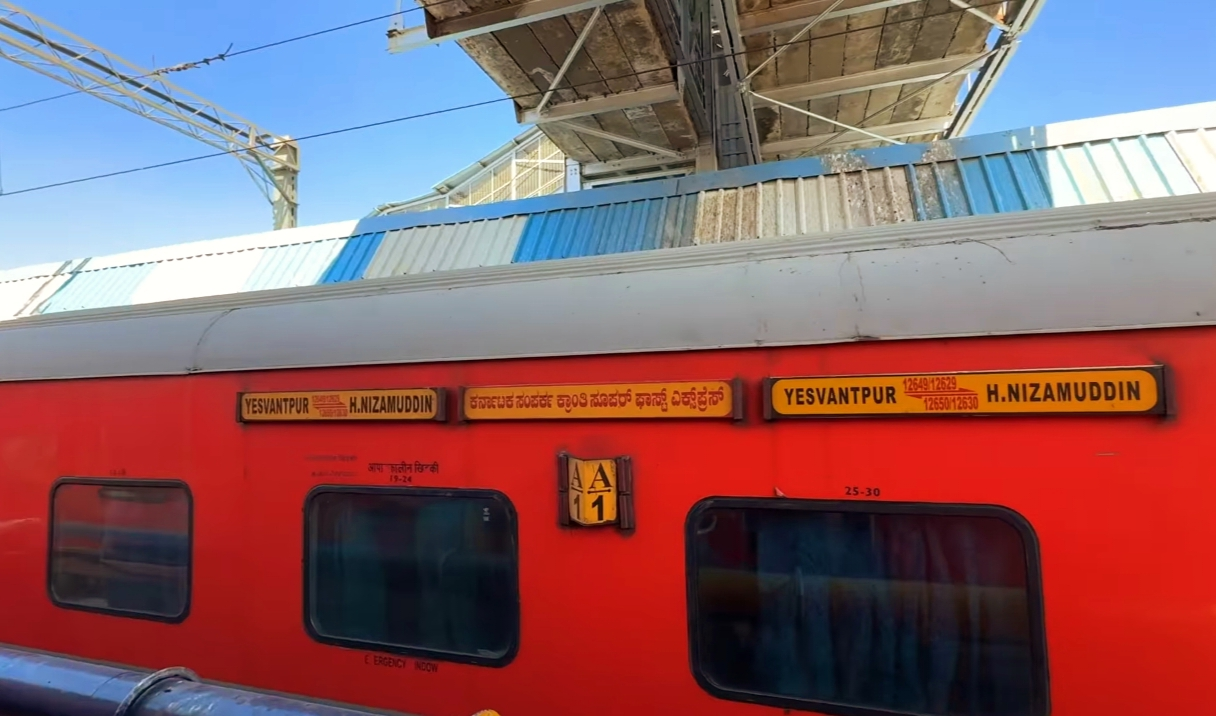
- Karnataka Sampark Kranti Express At Mathura Junction

Overview
- Service type: Sampark Kranti Express
- Locale: Karnataka, Andhra Pradesh, Telangana, Maharashtra, Madhya Pradesh, Uttar Pradesh, Haryana & Delhi
- First service: 8 February 2004; 22 years ago
- Current operator: South Western Railway

Route
- Termini: Yesvantpur Junction (YPR); Hazrat Nizamuddin (NZM)
- Stops: 8
- Distance travelled: 2,279 km (1,416 mi)
- Service frequency: 5 days a week
- Train number: 12649 / 12650

On-board services
- Classes: AC First Class, AC 2 tier, AC 3 tier, Sleeper class, General Unreserved
- Seating arrangements: Yes
- Sleeping arrangements: Yes
- Catering facilities: Available
- Observation facilities: Large windows
- Baggage facilities: Available
- Other facilities: Below the seats

Technical
- Rolling stock: LHB coach
- Track gauge: 1,676 mm (5 ft 6 in); Broad Gauge
- Operating speed: 65 km/h (40 mph) average including halts.
Route map
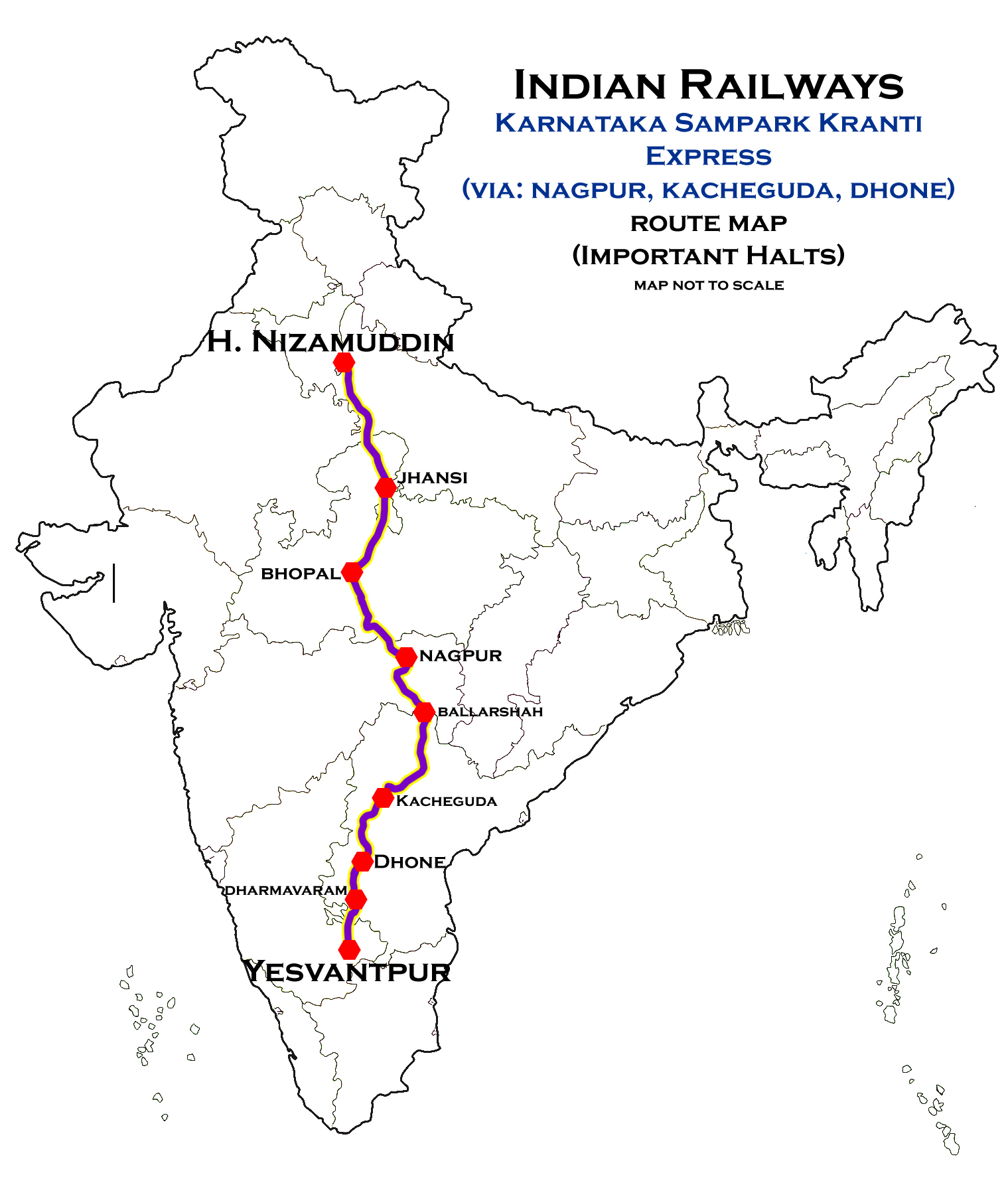

The 12649 / 12650 Karnataka Sampark Kranti SF Express of Karnataka is a Superfast Express train service of Sampark Kranti Express series in India, which runs between Yesvantpur in Bangalore to Hazrat Nizamuddin in Delhi. In addition another Karnataka Sampark Kranti started which runs between Chandigarh and Yeshvantapur. It provides a substitute to the Karnataka SF Express and also of superfast express category. The frequency of these trains in compilation of all the Sampark Kranti is daily. These trains provide an alternative link between KSR Bengaluru and New Delhi stations. It is the India's first Sampark Kranti SF Express train started by railways which started in 2004

== History ==
The train was introduced 8 February 2004. The train was introduced as a bi-weekly for initial years, and then existed as a tri-weekly train for some later years. At present the train runs five times a week. Later-on the second version of the train was introduced in 2009. It had a longer route than the parent train. It was introduced as a bi-weekly train. It was an alternative train for trains like Goa Express, Jhelum Express and Hazrat Nizamuddin–Mysore Swarna Jayanti Express. Mainly the train was introduced for passengers of Hubli and Pune.

In late 2012, another longer bi-weekly train was introduced till Chandigarh via Delhi. The schedule of both the longer trains were synchronized from Yeshwantpur to Delhi. For some technical reasons the schedule of the trains was increased. Normally the train used to take 3 hours between Bhopal and Jhansi, whereas the trains now take 6 hours between them, which includes a whole night. The technical stops with the duration of the halt were also increased.

== Route and halts ==
- Yesvantpur Junction
- Tumakuru
- Arsikere Junction
- Davangere
- Haveri
- Hubballi
- Gadag Junction
- Koppal
- Hosapete Junction
- Ballari Junction
- Guntakal Junction
- Kurnool City
- Kacheguda
- Kazipet Junction
- Balharshah
- Nagpur Junction
- Bhopal Junction,
- Jhansi Junction
- Gwalior
- Hazrat Nizamuddin

== Traction ==
Both trains are hauled by a Lallaguda-based WAP-7 locomotive from YPR to NZM.

== Rake sharing ==
The train shares its rake with 12629/12630 Karnataka Sampark Kranti Express (via Hubballi).

== Relevance ==
Sampark Kranti Express were introduced to provide faster connectivity from other than state capitals to the Country capital. Sampark Kranti i.e. revolution in connectivity was aimed at providing a very fast connectivity. 12649/50 travels faster than the Karnataka Express and is quite preferred.

== Speed ==
Karnataka Sampark Kranti Express runs at an average speed of approx 65 km/h (40.3m/h)and peak speed approx 110 km/h (68.3m/h). The peak speed of 12629/30 is mainly seen between Manmad Junction and Bhusawal Junction, which is 69 km/h. Whereas the peak speed of 12649/50 is between Dharmavaram Junction and Dhone Junction which is 95 km/h.

== Gallery ==
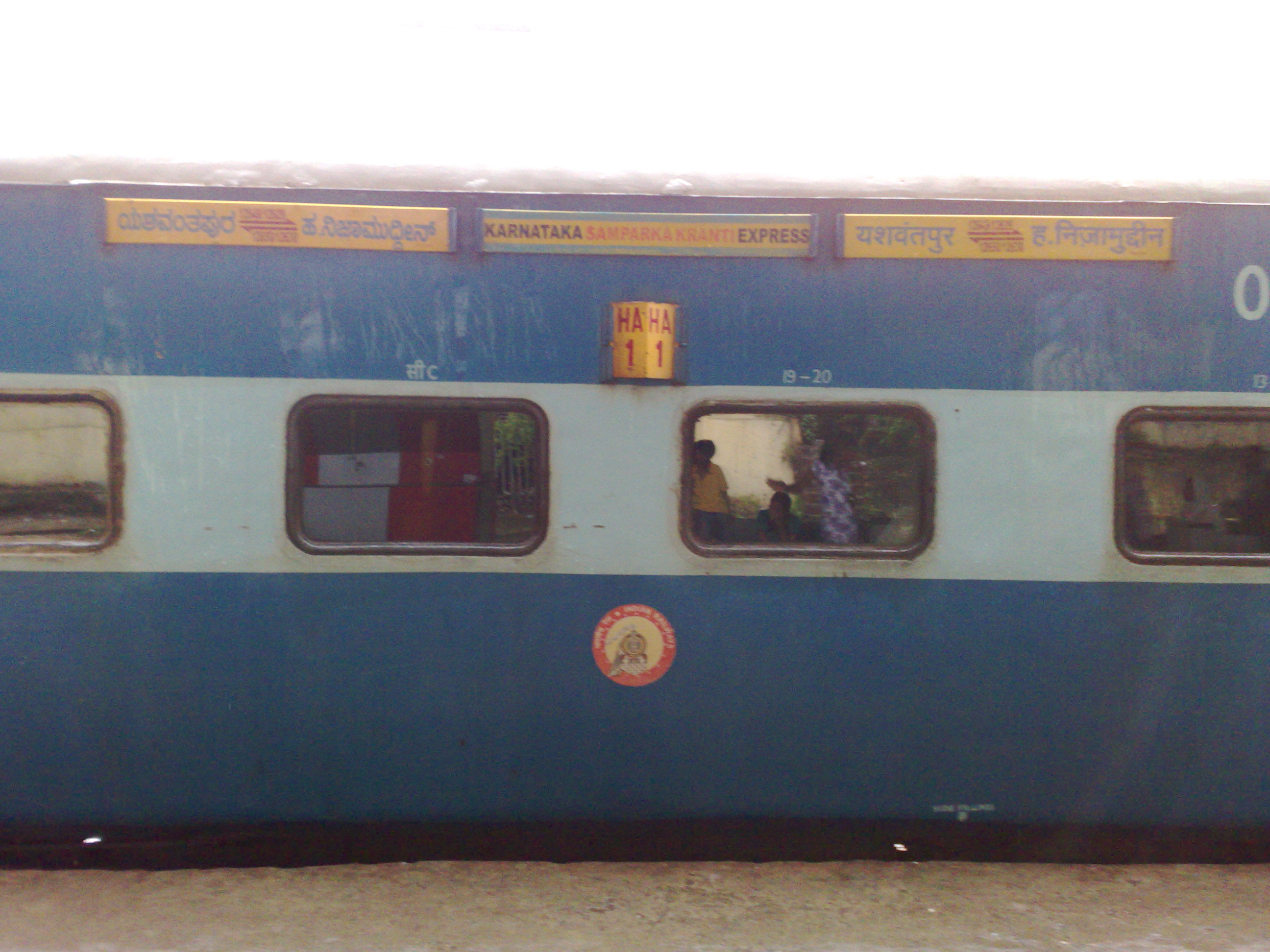
Karnataka Sampark Kranti Express AC 1st cum AC 2 tier coach

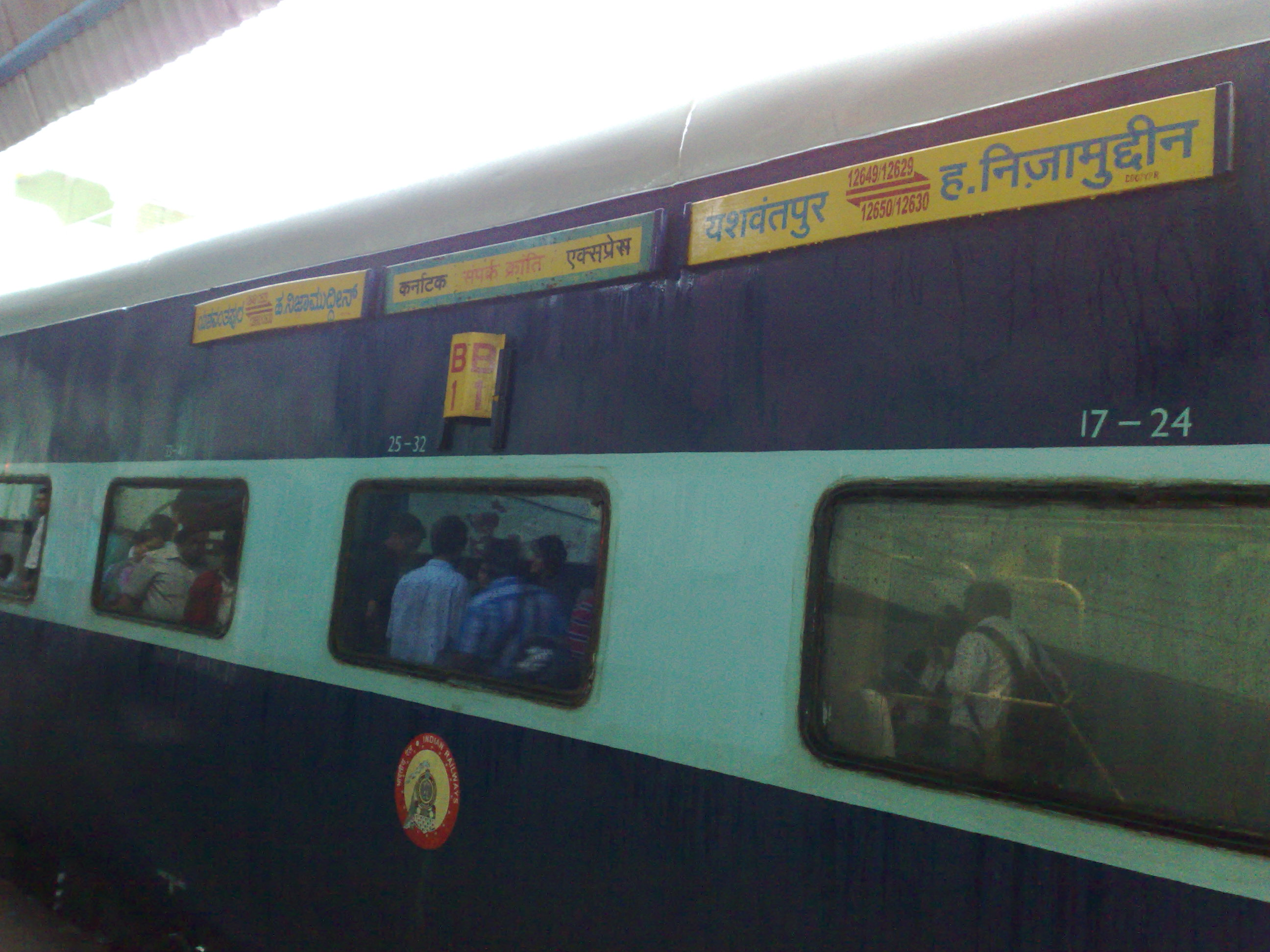
Karnataka Sampark Kranti Express AC 3 tier
