= Bihar Sampark Kranti Express =

Train in India

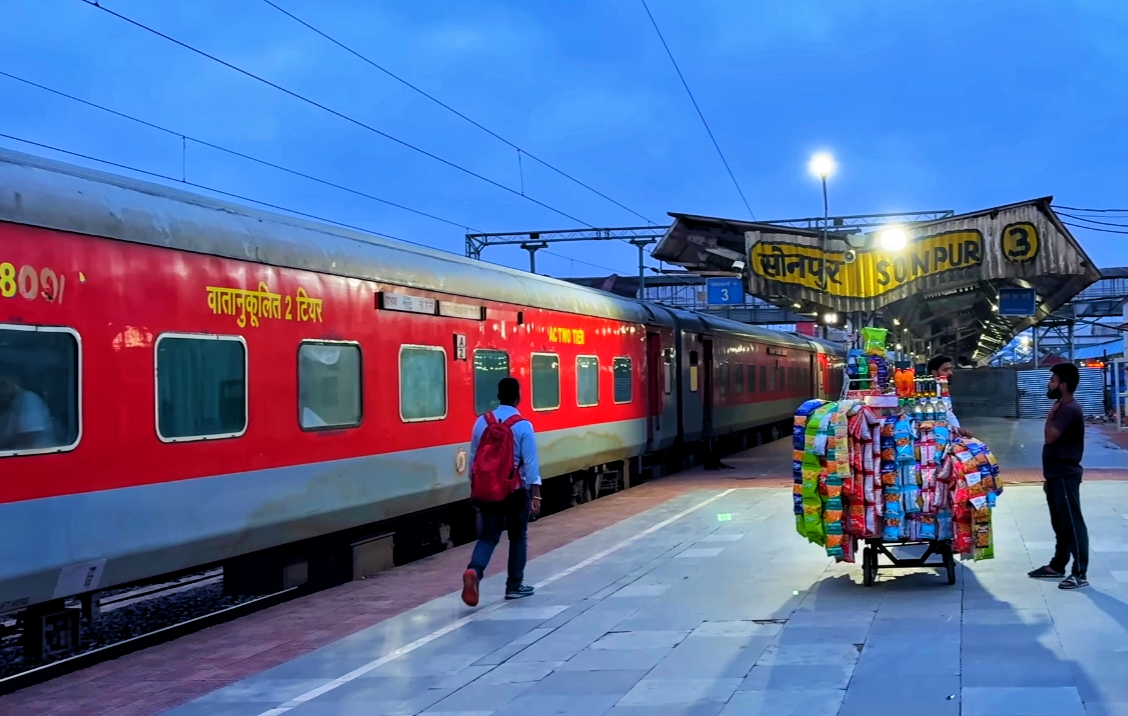
- Bihar Sampark Kranti Express At Sonpur Junction railway station

Overview
- Service type: Sampark Kranti Express
- Locale: Delhi, Uttar Pradesh & Bihar
- First service: 31 March 2005; 21 years ago
- Current operator: East Central Railway

Route
- Termini: Darbhanga (DBG); New Delhi (NDLS)
- Stops: 13
- Distance travelled: 1,168 km (726 mi)
- Average journey time: 20 hours 40 minutes
- Service frequency: Daily
- Train number: 12565 / 12566

On-board services
- Classes: AC first, AC 2 tier, AC 3 tier, Sleeper Class, General Unreserved
- Seating arrangements: Yes
- Sleeping arrangements: Yes
- Catering facilities: Available
- Observation facilities: Large windows
- Baggage facilities: Available
- Other facilities: Below the seats

Technical
- Rolling stock: decorated and non decorated LHB coach
- Track gauge: 1,676 mm (5 ft 6 in); Broad Gauge
- Operating speed: 59 km/h (37 mph) average including halts.
Route map
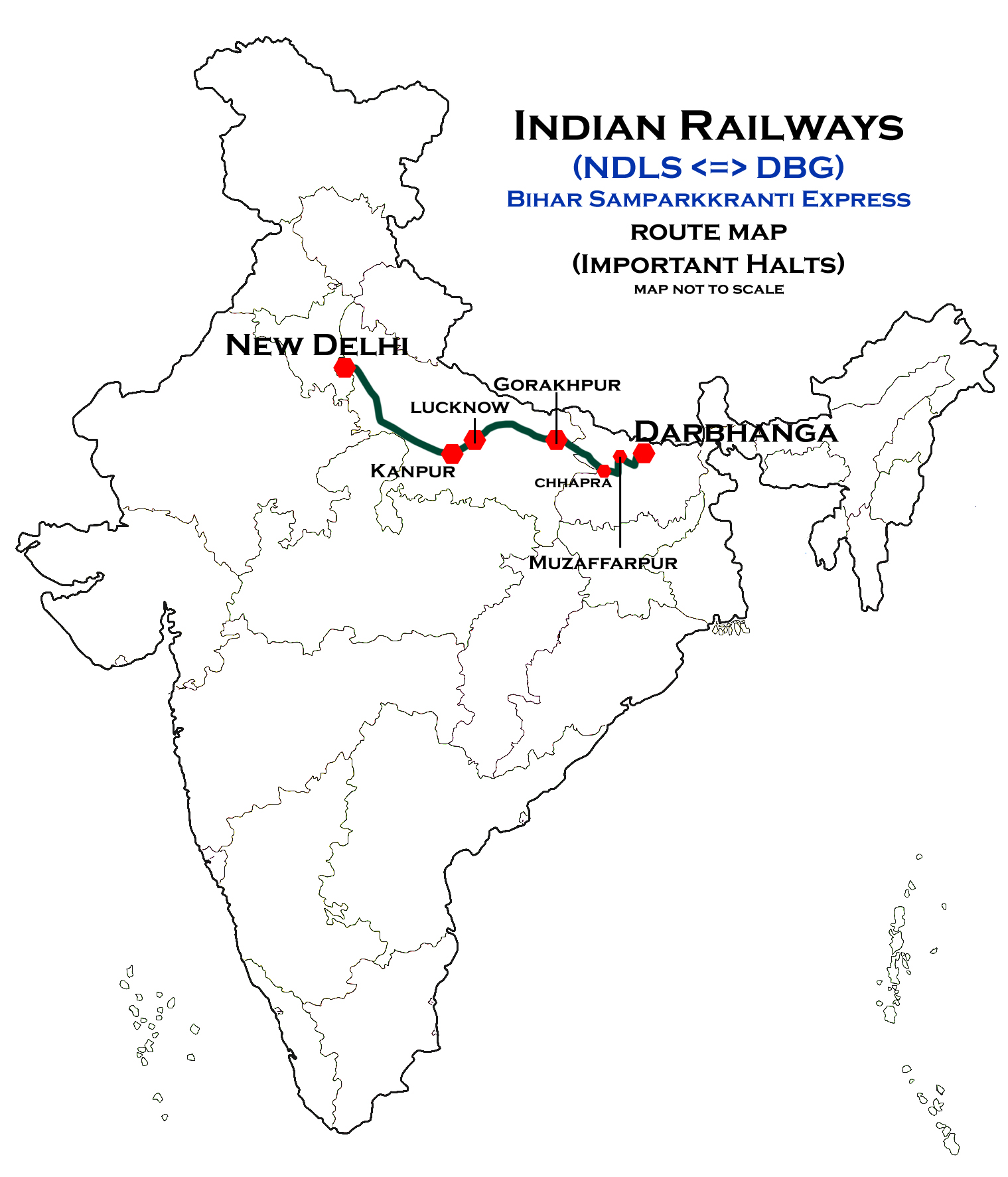

The 12565 / 12566 Bihar Sampark Kranti Express Is an daily superfast express train of Sampark Kranti category service of Indian Railways, which runs between the Indian cities of Darbhanga and New Delhi via Muzaffarpur Junction, Hajipur Junction, Siwan Junction, Chhapra Junction, Gorakhpur Junction, Aishbagh, Unnao Junction, Kanpur Central, India.

It operates as train number 12565 from Darbhanga Junction to New Delhi and as train number 12566 in the reverse direction. It is the most important train in North Bihar with Vaishali SF Express which runs from Saharsa in Bihar to New Delhi on daily basis.The other Superfast train which runs via Darbhanga to New Delhi is the 12561/12562 Swatantra Senani Superfast Express.

== Coaches ==
The 12565/12566 Bihar Sampark Kranti Superfast Express presently has 1 AC 1st Class, 2 AC 2 tier, 6 AC 3 tier,1 AC 3E, 6 Sleeper class, 3 General Unreserved coaches & 1 Pantry car.

As with most train services in India, coach composition may be amended at the discretion of Indian Railways depending on demand.

Aug 24th, the train coaches were painted in Maithili art.

In April 2019 the train ran for the first time between Darbhanga and New Delhi with the new decorated LHB coach the coach can be decorated or non decorated. Earlier was decorated blue paint ICF coach

== Service ==
The 12565 Bihar Sampark Kranti Superfast Express covers the distance of 1164 kilometers in 21 hours (55.42 km/h) & 1164 kilometers in 21 hours 12566 Bihar Sampark Kranti Superfast Express (55.42 km/h). As the average speed of the train is more than 55 km/h, a Superfast surcharge is applied. It reverses direction at Samastipur Junction.

== Route & halts ==
- Darbhanga Junction
- Samastipur Junction
- Muzaffarpur Junction
- Hajipur Junction
- Sonpur Junction
- Chhapra Junction
- Siwan Junction
- Deoria Sadar
- Gorakhpur Junction
- Badshahnagar
- Aishbagh
- Unnao Junction
- Kanpur Central
- New Delhi

== Traction ==
earlier was WDP-4D. It is hauled by a Kanpur Loco Shed or Samastipur Loco Shed-based WAP-7 or WAP-4 from New Delhi to Darbhanga and vice versa.

== Gallery ==
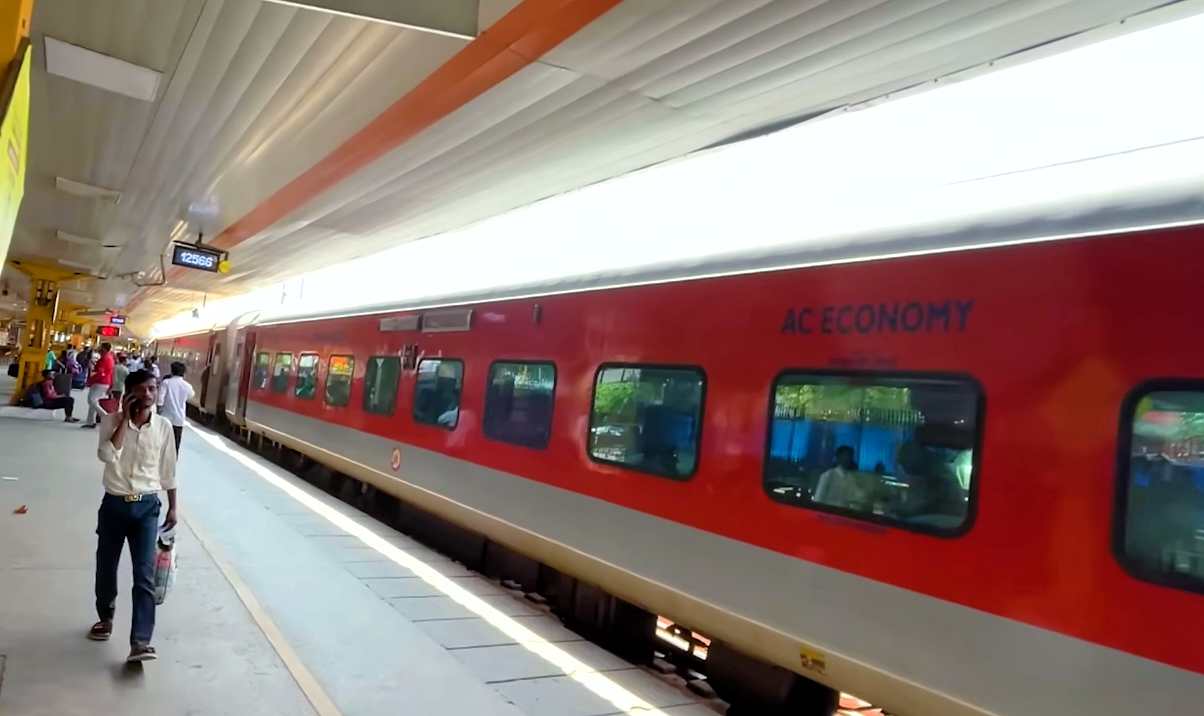
Bihar Sampark Kranti Express At New Delhi

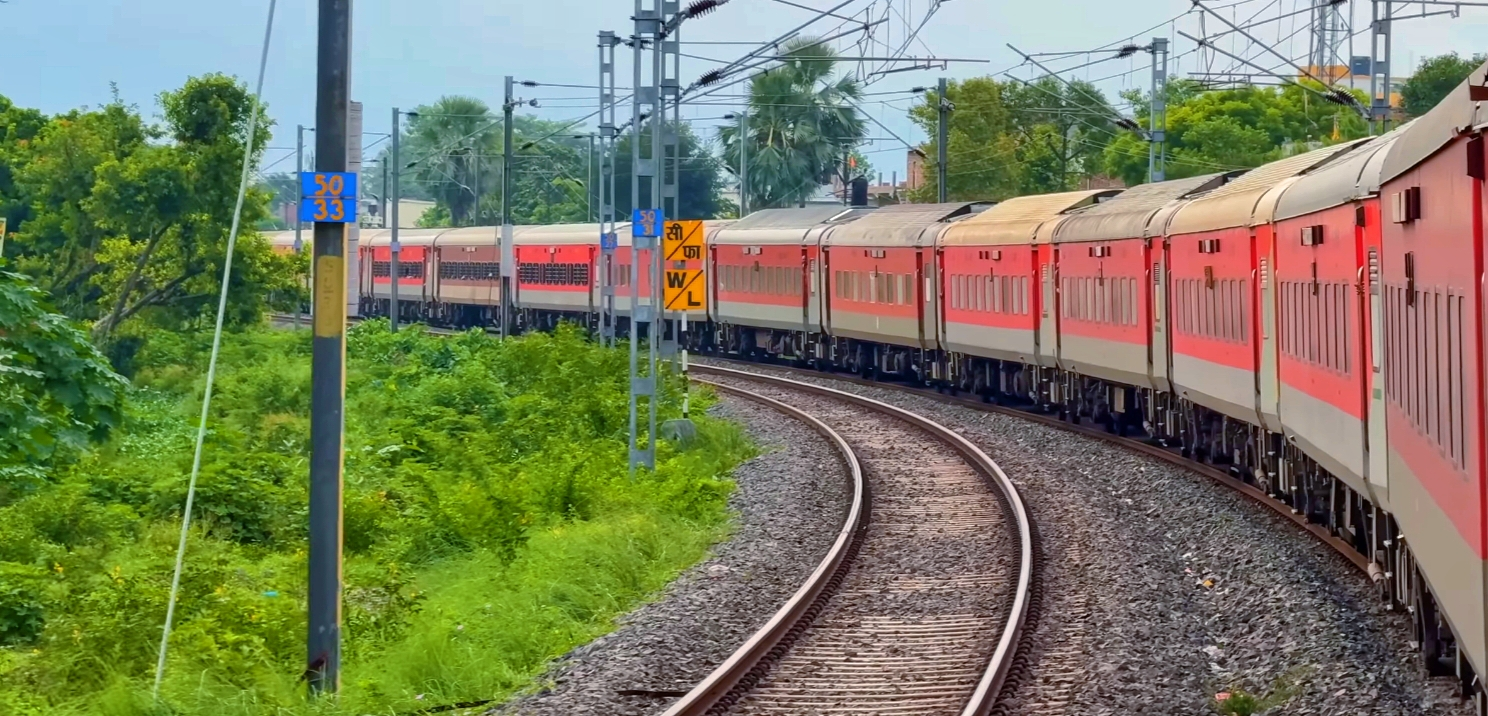
Bihar Sampark Kranti Express At Hajipur Junction

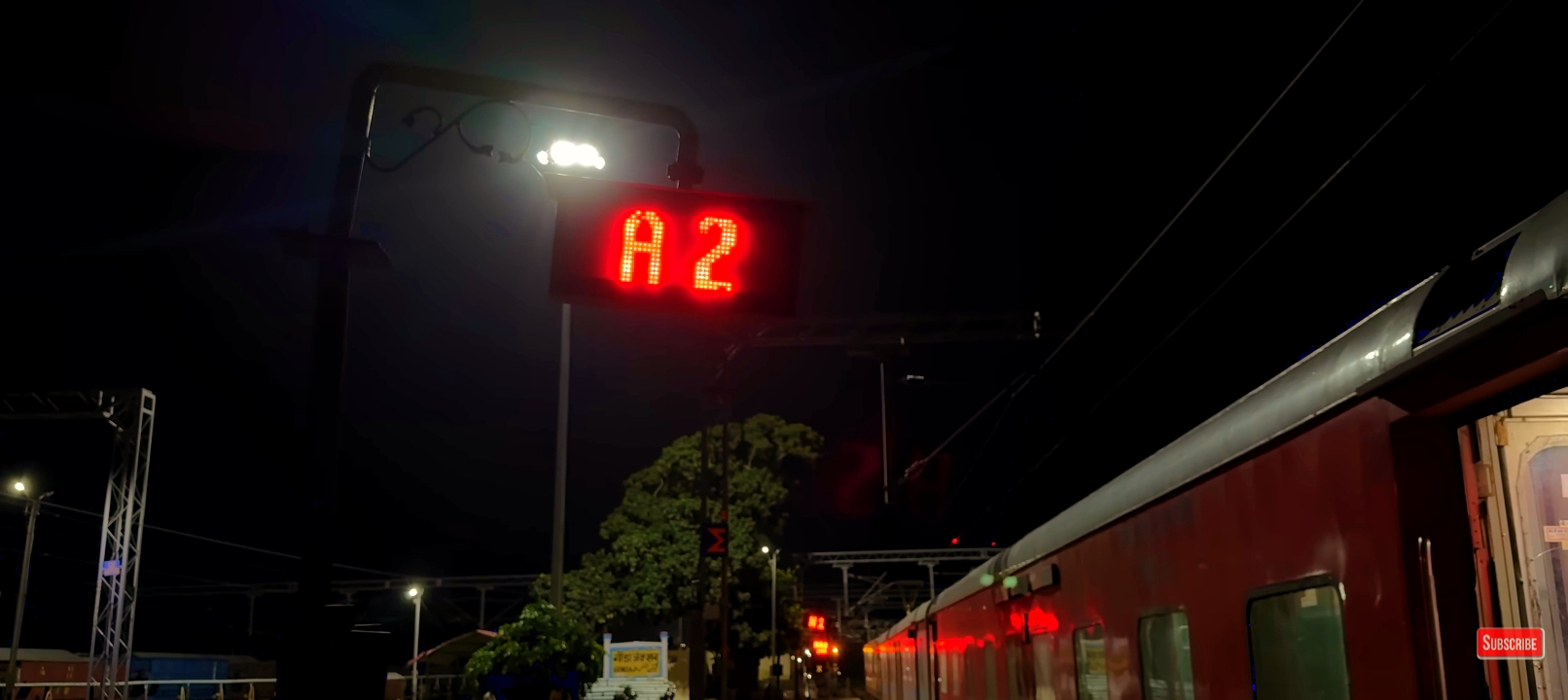
Bihar Sampark Kranti At Gonda Junction
