= Tamil Nadu Sampark Kranti Express =

Train in India

Overview
- Service type: Sampark Kranti Express
- First service: 19 September 2004; 22 years ago
- Current operator: Southern Railway

Route
- Termini: Madurai Junction (MDU); Hazrat Nizamuddin (NZM)
- Stops: 13
- Distance travelled: 2,676 km (1,663 mi)
- Average journey time: 42 hours approx.
- Service frequency: Bi-weekly
- Train number: 12651 / 12652

On-board services
- Classes: AC 2 Tier, AC 3 Tier, Sleeper Class, General Unreserved
- Seating arrangements: Yes
- Sleeping arrangements: Yes
- Catering facilities: Available
- Observation facilities: Large windows
- Baggage facilities: Available
- Other facilities: Below the seats

Technical
- Rolling stock: LHB coach
- Track gauge: 1,676 mm (5 ft 6 in)
- Operating speed: 63 km/h (39 mph) average including halts.
- Timetable number: 7 / 7A
- Rake maintenance: Madurai CDO
- Rake sharing: Madurai–Chennai Egmore Express (called as 'Mahal Superfast Express')

The 12651 / 12652 Tamil Nadu Sampark Kranti Express is one of the Sampark Kranti Express trains, operating on India's broad-gauge network that connects Madurai Junction in Tamil Nadu and Hazrat Nizamuddin in New Delhi, a distance of approximately 2,676 kilometres (1,663 mi) in 42 hours approximately, maintaining an average speed of 63 km/h (18 m/s). From April 2021, it runs with newly manufactured highly refurbished LHB rakes.

== Overview ==
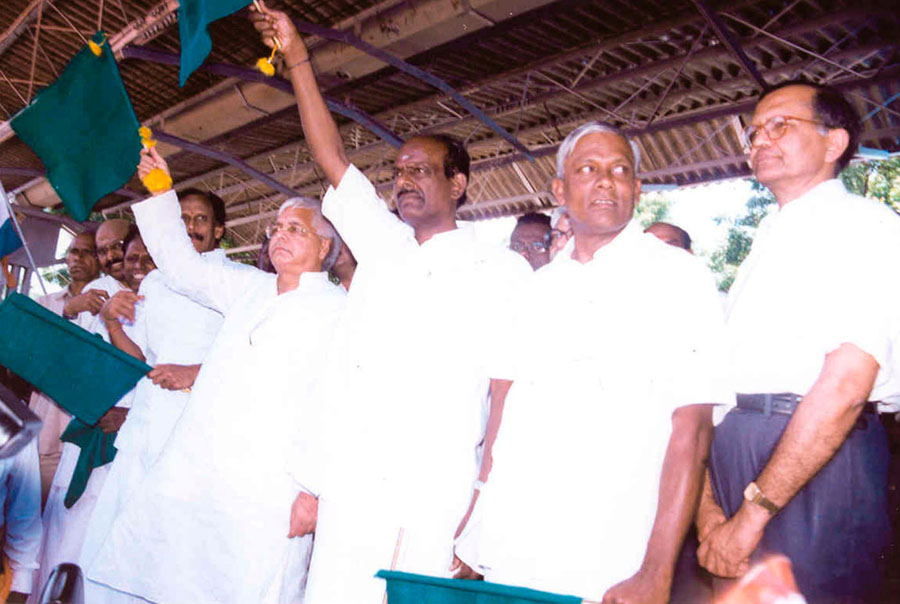
The Union Minister of Railways Mr.Lalu Prasad flagging off the newly introduced Madurai – Hazarat Nizzamudin Tamil Nadu Sampark Kranti Express at Madurai in Tamil Nadu on September 19, 2004.

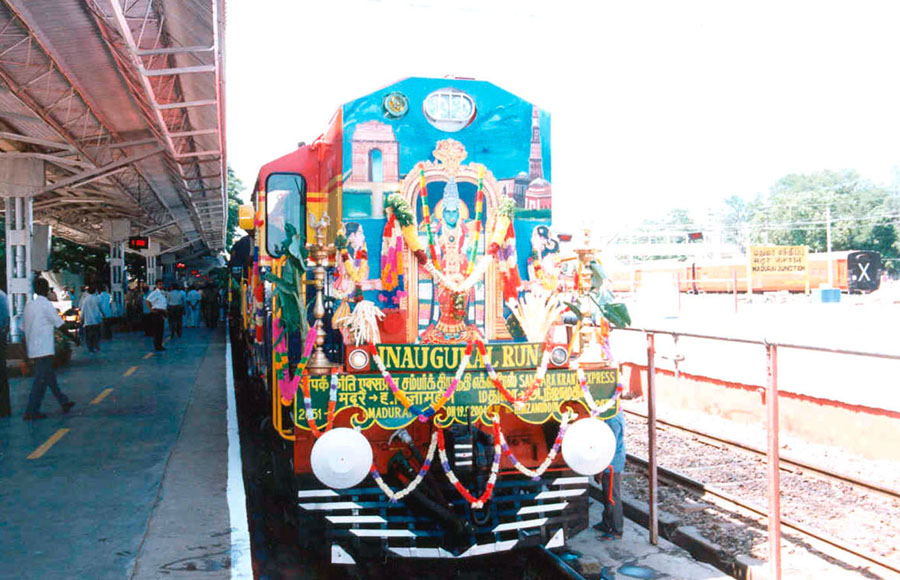
Diesel locomotive Sampark Kranti Express departure at Madurai on September 19, 2004.

This bi-weekly train was introduced to provide a quicker journey from New Delhi to Tamil Nadu. Southern Railway began operating the train on 19 September 2004. It shares its rakes with 22623/22624 Madurai–Chennai Egmore–Madurai Bi-weekly Superfast Express (via Dindigul, Trichy, Thanjavur, Viluppuram).

== Coach composition ==
- 1 AC Two Tier
- 2 AC Three Tier
- 8 Sleeper class
- 4 Unreserved
- 1 Pantry car
- 2 End-on Generator car (EOG)

== Timings ==
- 12651 Madurai Junction–Hazrat Nizamuddin Express departs Madurai Junction every Monday and Wednesday at 00.55 and reaches Hazrat Nizamuddin at 18.35 the next day.
- In return, 12652 Hazrat Nizamuddin–Madurai Junction leaves Hazrat Nizamuddin every Tuesday and Thursday at 05.20 and reaches Madurai Junction at 00.05 Tuesday and Thursday.

== Route and halts ==
It runs from Madurai Junction via Dindigul Junction, Tiruchirappalli Junction, Ariyalur, Vriddhachalam Junction, Viluppuram Junction, Chengalpattu Junction, Tambaram, Chennai Egmore, Vijayawada Junction, Balharshah Junction, Nagpur Junction, Bhopal Junction, Jhansi Junction to Hazrat Nizamuddin.

== Traction ==
The route is fully electrified, it is hauled by a Royapuram Loco Shed-based WAP-7 electric locomotive from end to end journey.
