= Yesvantpur–Pandharpur Express =

Express train in India

Yesvantpur – Pandharpur Express
Overview
- Service type: Express
- First service: 2 March 2015 Started as Tatkal Special train 5 July 2018 Converted into regular train
- Current operator: South Western Railways

Route
- Termini: Yesvantpur Junction; Pandharpur
- Stops: 11
- Distance travelled: 880 km (547 mi)
- Average journey time: 17 hours 30 mins
- Service frequency: Weekly
- Train number: 16541 / 16542

On-board services
- Classes: AC 1st Class, AC 2 tier, AC 3 tier, Sleeper, General
- Sleeping arrangements: Yes
- Catering facilities: No Pantry Car Coach attached

Technical
- Rolling stock: ICF coach
- Track gauge: 1,676 mm (5 ft 6 in)
- Operating speed: 140 km/h (87 mph) maximum,52 km/h (32 mph), including halts

Yesvantpur – Pandharpur Express is an Express train belonging to South Western Railway zone of Indian Railways that run between Yesvantpur Junction and Pandharpur in India.

== Background ==
This train was inaugurated on 2 March 2015, between Yeshwantpur and Miraj as Tatkal special train with number 06541 / 06542 and runs only on Summer and Winter time but the demand was high for connectivity between Bangalore and Pandharpur. In May 2018 the South Western Railway announced that the route would be operated as regular weekly service beginning 5 July 2018.

== Service ==
Frequency of this train is weekly and it covers the distance of 880 km with an average speed of 52 km/h on both sides.

== Routes ==
This train passes through Arsikere Junction, Hubballi Junction, Dharwad, Belagavi & Miraj Junction on both sides.

== Traction ==
As the route is under electrification a WDP-4 loco pulls the train to its destination on both sides.
