= Madurai–Chennai Egmore Express =

Train in India

Madurai–Tambaram Superfast Express

Overview
- Service type: Superfast
- First service: 24 April 2010; 16 years ago
- Current operator: Southern Railway

Route
- Termini: Madurai (MDU); Tambaram (TBM)
- Stops: 8
- Distance travelled: 533 km (331 mi)
- Average journey time: 9 hours 35 minutes
- Service frequency: Bi-weekly
- Train number: 22623 / 22624

On-board services
- Classes: AC 2 Tier, AC 3 Tier, Sleeper Class, General Unreserved
- Seating arrangements: Yes
- Sleeping arrangements: Yes
- Catering facilities: E-catering
- Observation facilities: Large windows
- Baggage facilities: No
- Other facilities: Below the seats

Technical
- Rolling stock: LHB coach
- Track gauge: 1,676 mm (5 ft 6 in)
- Operating speed: 56 km/h (35 mph) average including halts.

The 22623 / 22624 Madurai–Tambaram Superfast Express or Mahal Superfast Express is a superfast express train belonging to Indian Railways – Southern Railway zone that runs between Madurai Junction and Tambaram in India.

It operates as train number 22624 from Madurai Junction to Chennai Egmore and as train number 22623 in the reverse direction, serving the state of Tamil Nadu. It shares its rakes with 12651/12652 Tamil Nadu Sampark Kranti Express. From April 2021, it runs with brand new LHB rakes.

== Coaches ==
The 22624 / 23 Mahal Superfast Express presently has

- 1 AC 2 tier
- 2 AC 3 tier
- 8 Sleeper class
- 4 General Unreserved
- 2 EOG (End-On Generator)

As with most train services in India, coach composition may be amended at the discretion of Indian Railways depending on demand.

== Timings ==
- 22624 Madurai Junction–Chennai Egmore Superfast Express departs Madurai Junction every Thursday & Saturday at 20.50 and reaches Chennai Egmore at 06.55 the next day.
- In return, 22623 Chennai Egmore–Madurai Junction leaves Chennai Egmore every Friday & Sunday at 22.05 and reaches Madurai Junction at 08.10 the next day.

== Routeing ==
The 22624 / 23 Mahal Superfast Express runs from Madurai Junction via Dindigul junction, Tiruchirappalli Junction, Thanjavur Junction, Kumbakonam, Mayiladuthurai Junction, Chidambaram, Cuddalore port junction, Viluppuram Junction, Chengalpattu junction, Tambaram to Chennai Egmore.

== Traction ==
As the route is electrified, it is hauled end-to-end by an Erode Loco Shed-based WAP-7 electric locomotive.
