= Karnataka Sampark Kranti Express (via Belagavi) =

Train in India

- Lalagura WAP-7 hauling Karnataka Sampark Kranti Exp

Overview
- Service type: Sampark Kranti Express
- First service: 18 July 2006; 19 years ago
- Current operator: South Western Railway

Route
- Termini: Yesvantpur Junction (YPR); Hazrat Nizamuddin (NZM)
- Stops: 12
- Distance travelled: 2,614 km (1,624 mi)
- Average journey time: 47 hrs 15 mins
- Service frequency: Bi-weekly (Note: Runs two days in a week for every direction.)
- Train number: 12629 / 12630

On-board services
- Classes: AC 2 tier, AC 3 tier, Sleeper class, General Unreserved
- Seating arrangements: Yes
- Sleeping arrangements: Yes
- Catering facilities: On-board catering, E-catering
- Observation facilities: Large windows
- Baggage facilities: No
- Other facilities: Below the seats

Technical
- Rolling stock: LHB coach
- Track gauge: 1,676 mm (5 ft 6 in)
- Operating speed: 55.3 km/h (34 mph) average including halts.
Route map
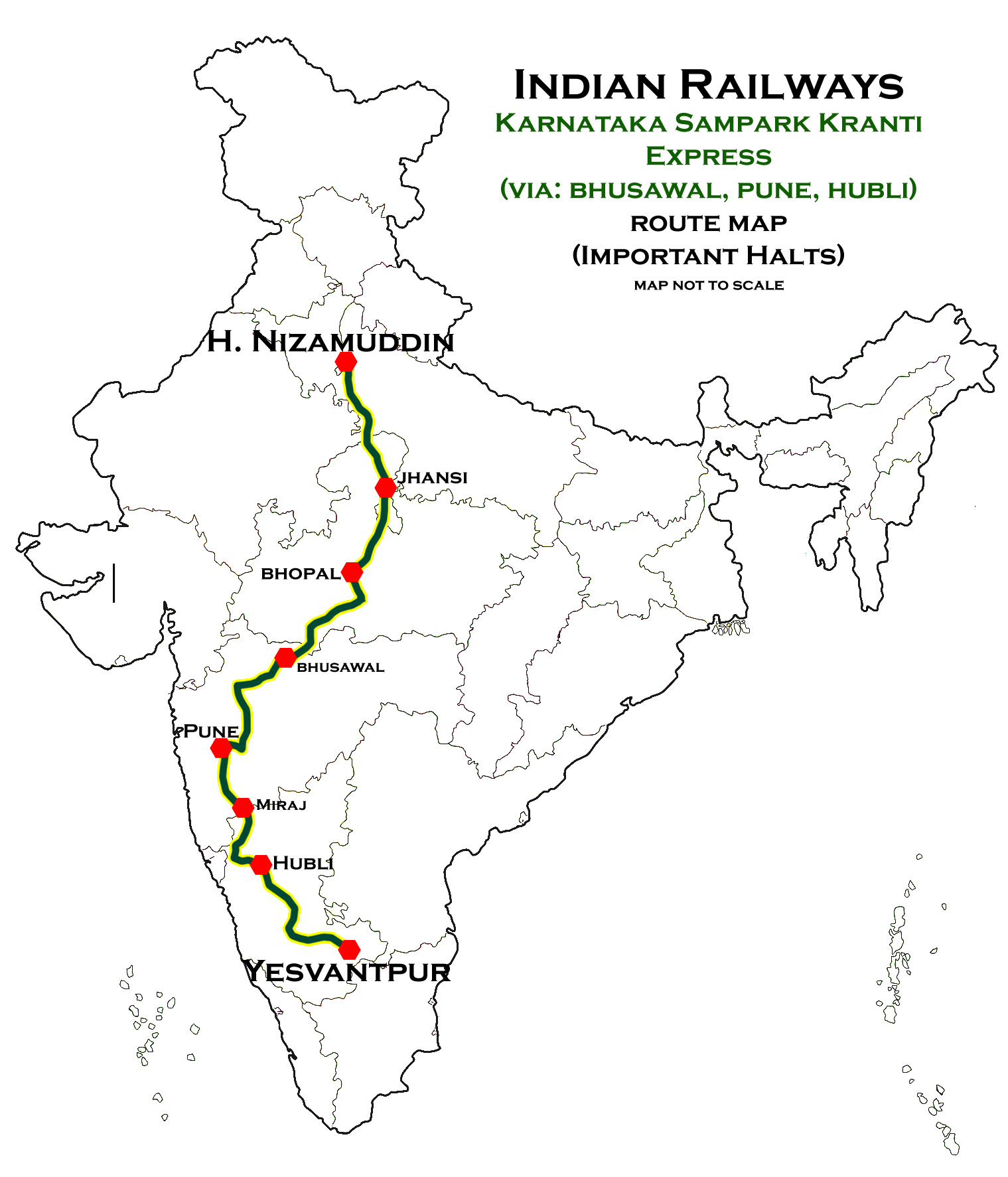
- 12629/12630 Karnataka Samparkkranti Express (via Hubli) Route map

The 12629 / 12630 Karnataka Sampark Kranti Express is a Sampark Kranti Express train belonging to South Western Railway Zone that runs between Yesvantpur Junction and Hazrat Nizamuddin in India. It is currently being operated with 12629/12630 train numbers on a biweekly basis.

== Traction ==
earlier was WDP-4D. As the route entirely electrified, it runs end to end by WAP-7 electrified locomotive

== See also ==
- Yesvantpur Junction railway station
- Hazrat Nizamuddin railway station
- Karnataka Sampark Kranti Express (disambiguation)
- Yesvantpur–Chandigarh Karnataka Sampark Kranti Express
