= Gorakhpur–Yesvantpur Express =

Train in India

Yesvantpur–Gorakhpur Express
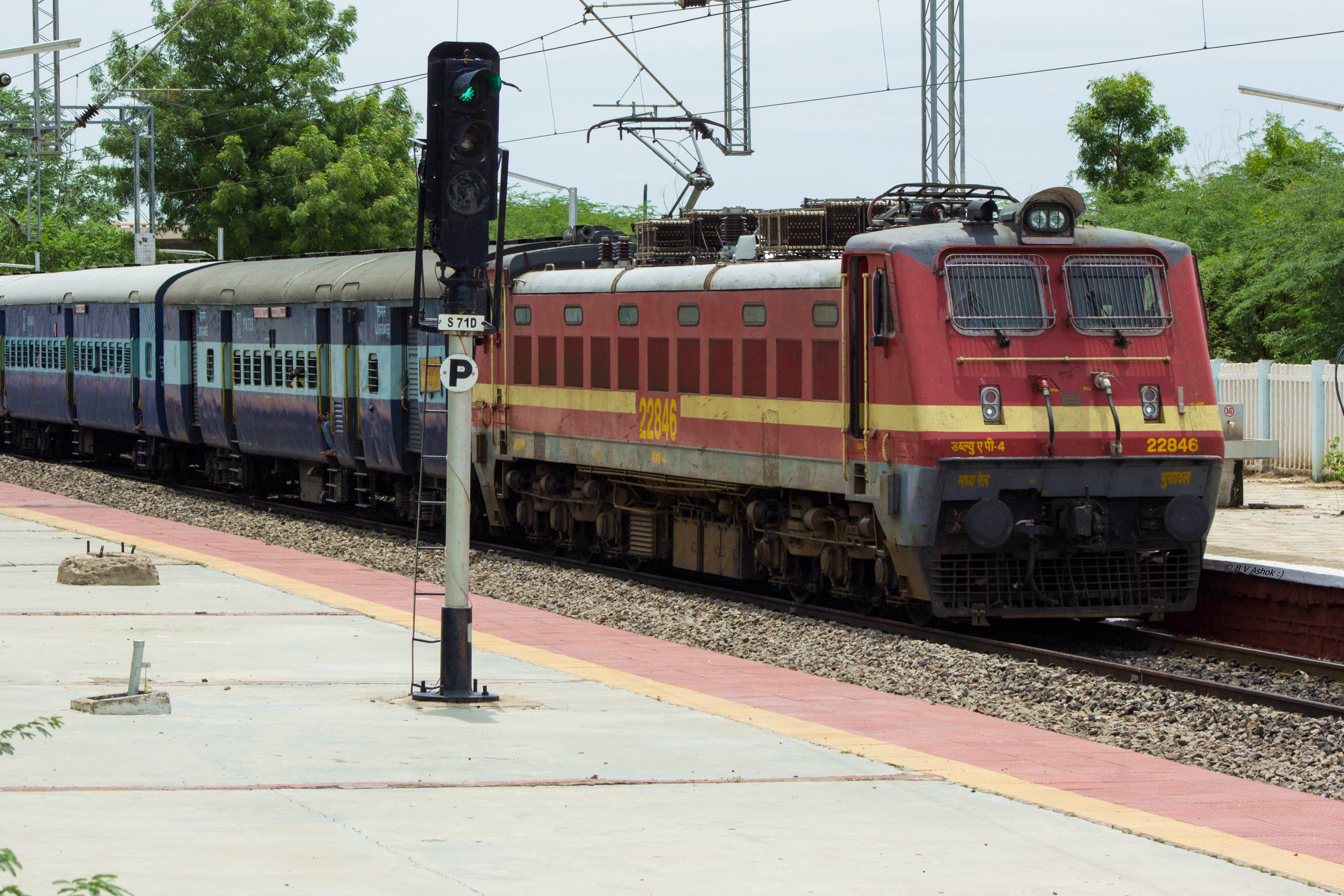
- Yeshavantapur–Gorakhpur Express

Overview
- Service type: Superfast
- First service: 1 October 1997; 29 years ago
- Current operator: North Eastern Railway zone

Route
- Termini: Yesvantpur Junction; Gorakhpur Junction2,515 km (1,563 mi)
- Stops: 42
- Average journey time: 45 hours 45 mins
- Service frequency: Weekly
- Train number: 12592 / 12591

On-board services
- Classes: AC 1st, AC 2 tier, AC 3 tier, sleeper class, general unreserved
- Seating arrangements: Yes
- Sleeping arrangements: Yes
- Catering facilities: Yes

Technical
- Rolling stock: Standard Indian Railways coaches
- Track gauge: 1,676 mm (5 ft 6 in)
- Operating speed: 55 km/h (34 mph)
Route map
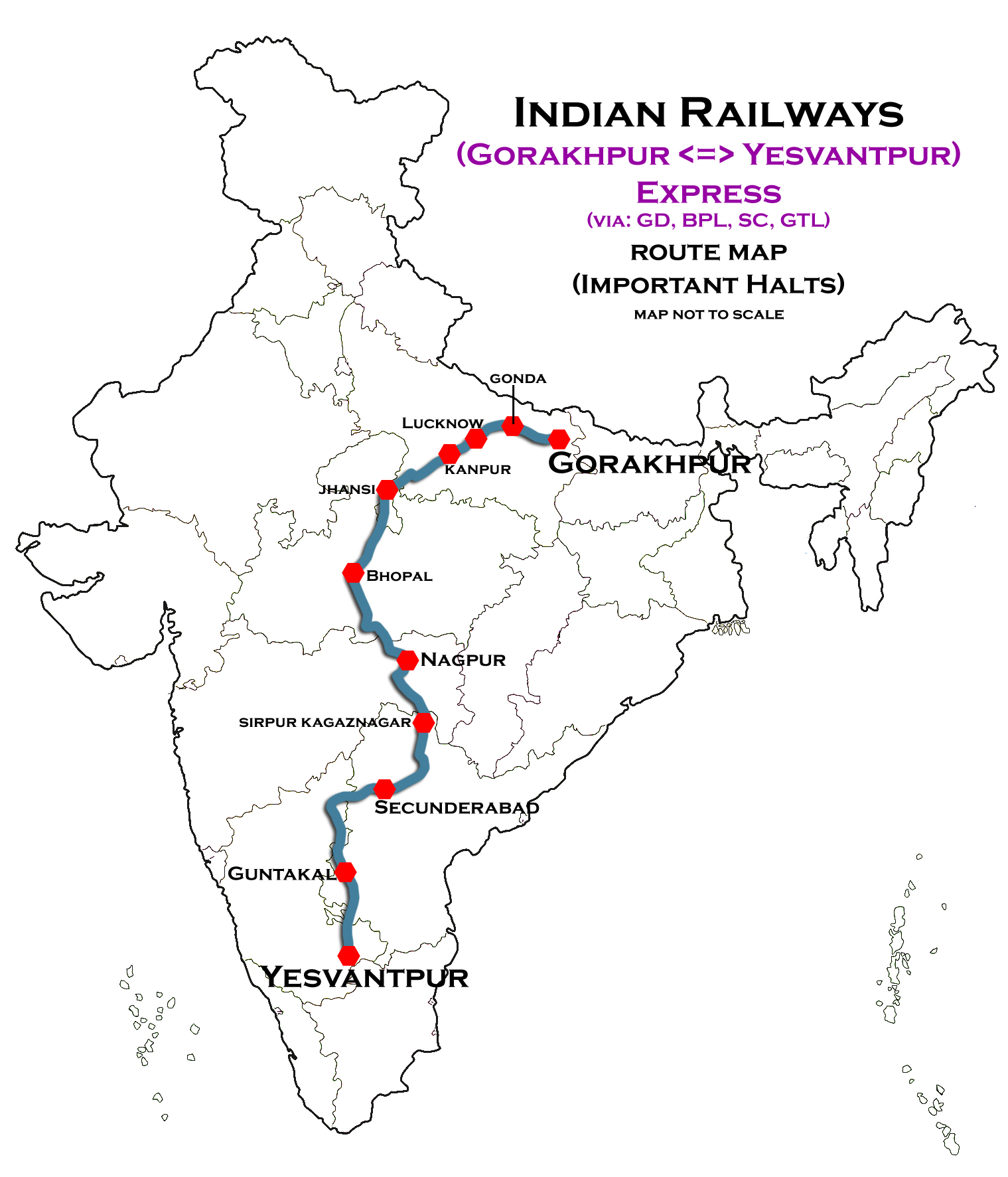

The 12592 / 91 Yesvantpur–Gorakhpur Express is a Superfast Express train belonging to Indian Railways North Eastern Railway zone that runs between Yesvantpur Junction and Gorakhpur Junction in India.The Bi-weekly service from Gorakhpur was going to Hyderabad as 5090/5089 Gorakhpur - Hyderabad Express(now 12590/12589 Secunderabad - Gorakhpur - Secunderabad). Later, one day run of 5090/89 was extended to Bangalore(Bengaluru) as 5092/5091(now 12592/12591 Yesvantpur - Gorakhpur - Yesvantpur Express).

It operates as train number 12592 from Yesvantpur Junction to Gorakhpur Junction and as train number 12591 in the reverse direction, serving the states of Karnataka, Andhra Pradesh, Telangana, Maharashtra, Madhya Pradesh & Uttar Pradesh.

== Coaches ==
The 12592 / 91 Yesvantpur–Gorakhpur Express gets an LHB coach and it has one AC 2-tier, four AC 3-tier, 11 sleeper class, four general unreserved & two SLR (seating with luggage rake) coaches and two high capacity parcel van coaches. It carries a pantry car.

As is customary with most train services in India, coach composition may be amended at the discretion of Indian Railways depending on demand.

== Service ==
The 12592 Yesvantpur Junction–Gorakhpur Junction express covers the distance of 2,515 km (1,563 mi) in 45 hours 45 mins (55 km/h) and in 45 hours 45 mins as the 12591 Gorakhpur Junction–Yesvantpur Junction (55 km/h).

As the average speed of the train is equal to 55 km/h (34 mph), as per railway rules, its fare doesn't includes a Superfast surcharge.

== Routing ==
The 12592 / 91 runs from Yesvantpur Junction via Dharmavaram Junction, Guntakal Junction, Raichur, Secunderabad Junction, Balharshah Junction, Nagpur Junction, Itarsi Junction, Bhopal Junction, Jhansi Junction, Kanpur Central, Lucknow Charbagh, Gonda Junction, Basti, to Gorakhpur Junction.

== Traction ==
earlier they run with diesel link WDM-3A. As the route is fully electrified, a Lallaguda-based WAP-7 and WAP-4 or WAG-7 and WAG 7 Tigerface pulls the train to its destination Gorakhpur Junction.

== See also ==
- Gorakhpur–Secunderabad Express
