= Yesvantpur Junction railway station =

Railway station in India

Yesvantpur Junction Yaśavantapura Jaṅkṣan
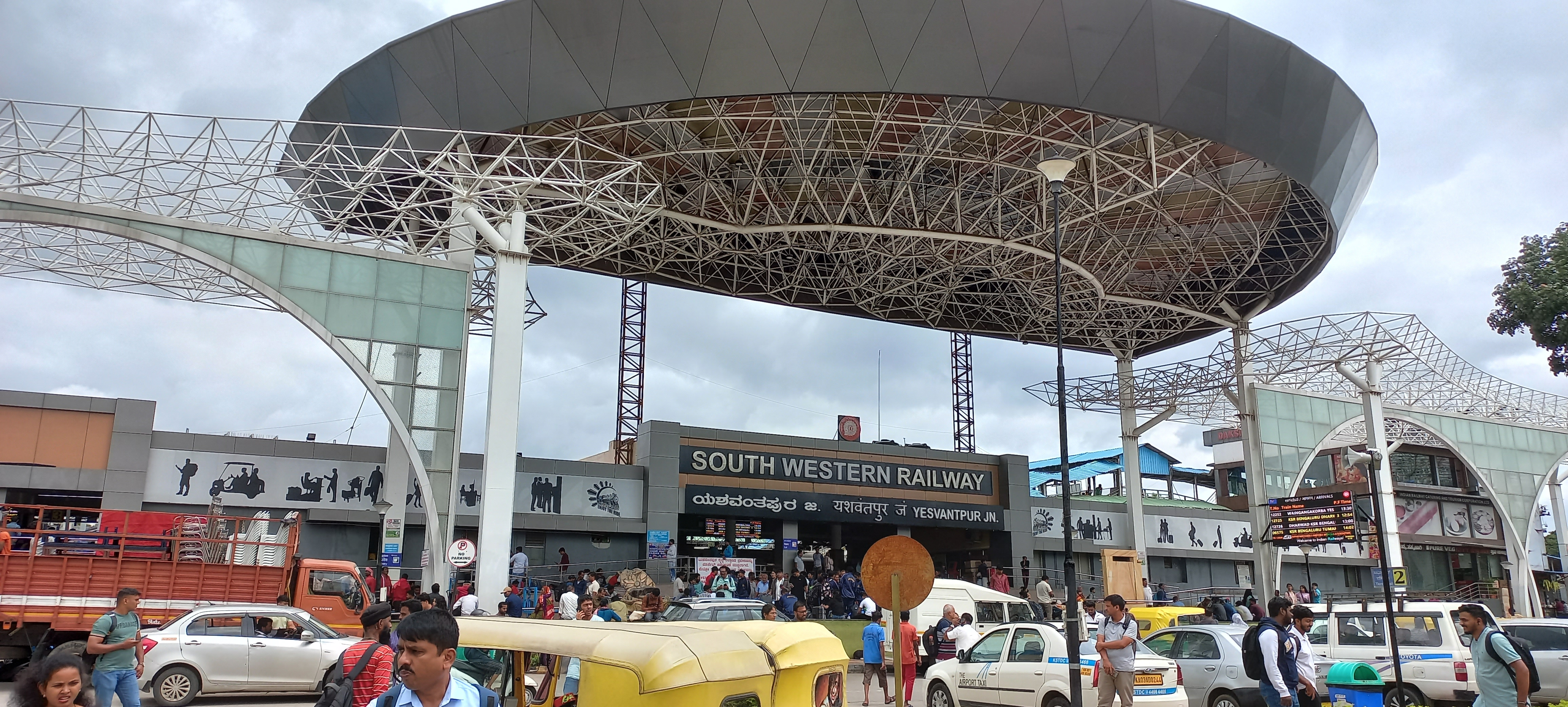
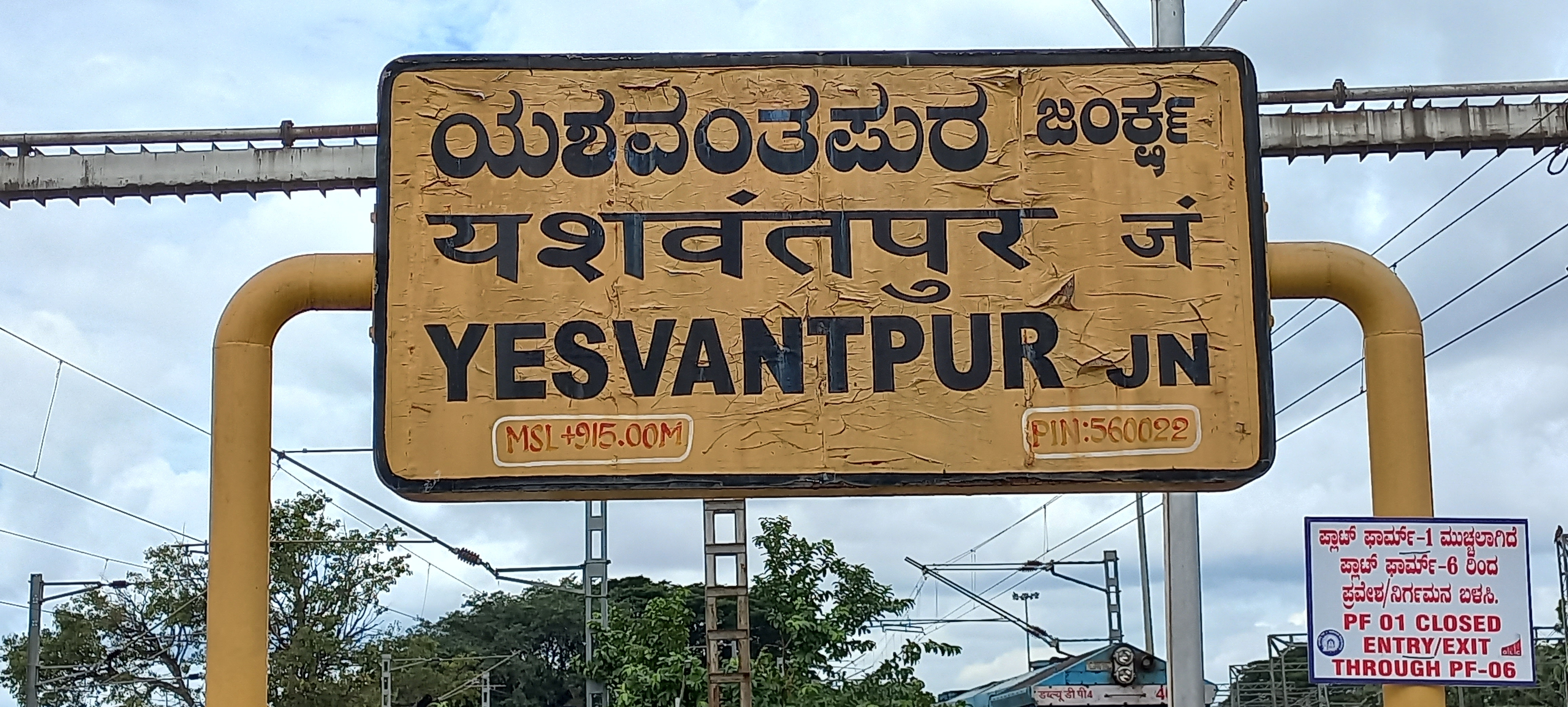
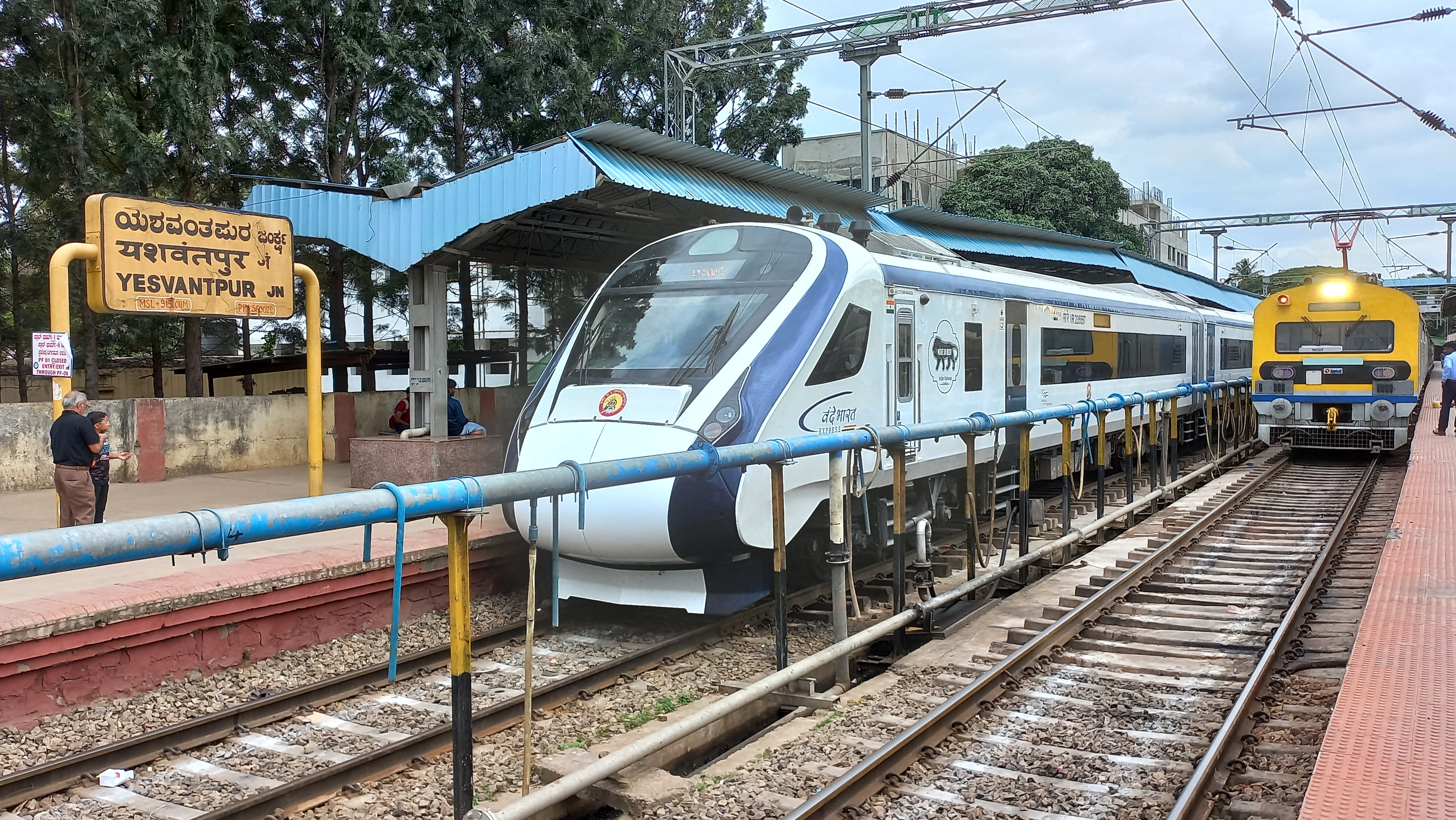
- Front Entrance (top); Station Board (left); Yesvantpur Mini Vande Bharat Express train heading towards Kacheguda railway station (right)

General information
- Other names: Yeshwanthapura Junction
- Location: Bengaluru–Tumakur Road, Bengaluru, Karnataka; India
- Coordinates: 13.02°N 77.55°E
- Elevation: 915.009 metres (3,002.00 ft)
- System: Indian Railways station
- Owner: Indian Railways
- Lines: Bengaluru–Guntakal section; Bengaluru–Arsikere–Hubballi line
- Platforms: 6
- Tracks: 8
- Connections: Green Line Yeshwanthpur; BMTC buses

Construction
- Structure type: At grade
- Parking: Yes

Other information
- Status: Active
- Station code: YPR
- Fare zone: South Western

History
- Rebuilt: Yes; Under construction
Location

Yesvantpur Junction railway station also Yeshwanthapura Junction railway station (station code: YPR) is one of the three important stations which serves the city of Bangalore which is located in Yesvantpur locality. It is one of the developing stations of Bangalore created for reducing the rush at Bangalore City railway station.

== Location ==
This station is located on the Bengaluru–Pune & Bengaluru–Hyderabad main lines. Being a main location, all trains bound towards Hubballi & Secunderabad either originate from here or the ones from KSR Bengaluru have a stop at this station. Direct trains to major Indian cities such as Delhi, Mumbai, Pune, Indore, Bhubaneswar, Bhopal, Gwalior, Jabalpur, Ajmer, Jaipur, Ayodhya, Gorakhpur, Lucknow, Chandigarh, Thiruvananthapuram, Mangaluru, Kannur, Kozhikode, Ahmedabad, Puducherry etc. also originate from Yeshwantpur.

== Infrastructure ==
Yesvantpur Junction railway station has a total of 6 platforms out of which platform 1,2,4,5 and 6 are platforms for originating & terminating trains. Platform 3 is generally used by passing-through trains. There are two overbridges, one connecting platform 1 and 2, and another from platform 2 to platforms 3,4,5 and 6. It has 2 entrances-one from Yeshwantapur old area, and another from Tumkur Road. The one on Tumkur Road connects to platform-6. The Yeshwanthpur metro station is at a walkable distance from the station.

Yesvantpur Junction railway station has 6 non-AC retiring rooms and 12 dormitories at a reasonable cost. Other facilities such as AC VIP Lounge, Essential stalls, and an ATM also available in the station. It even provides free Wi-Fi for the people in and nearby the station.

== Proposed expansion ==
A vehicle parking facility is planned to be built in front of the station building in association with Bengaluru Metro Rail Corporation as Yeshwanthpur metro station is opposite to this railway station. Also a connectivity bridge at first floor between the railway station and metro station along with other amenities such as passenger-facilitation centre at the main entry; retiring rooms and a food plaza are also planned.

== Gallery ==
Some of this railway station pictures are shown below:-

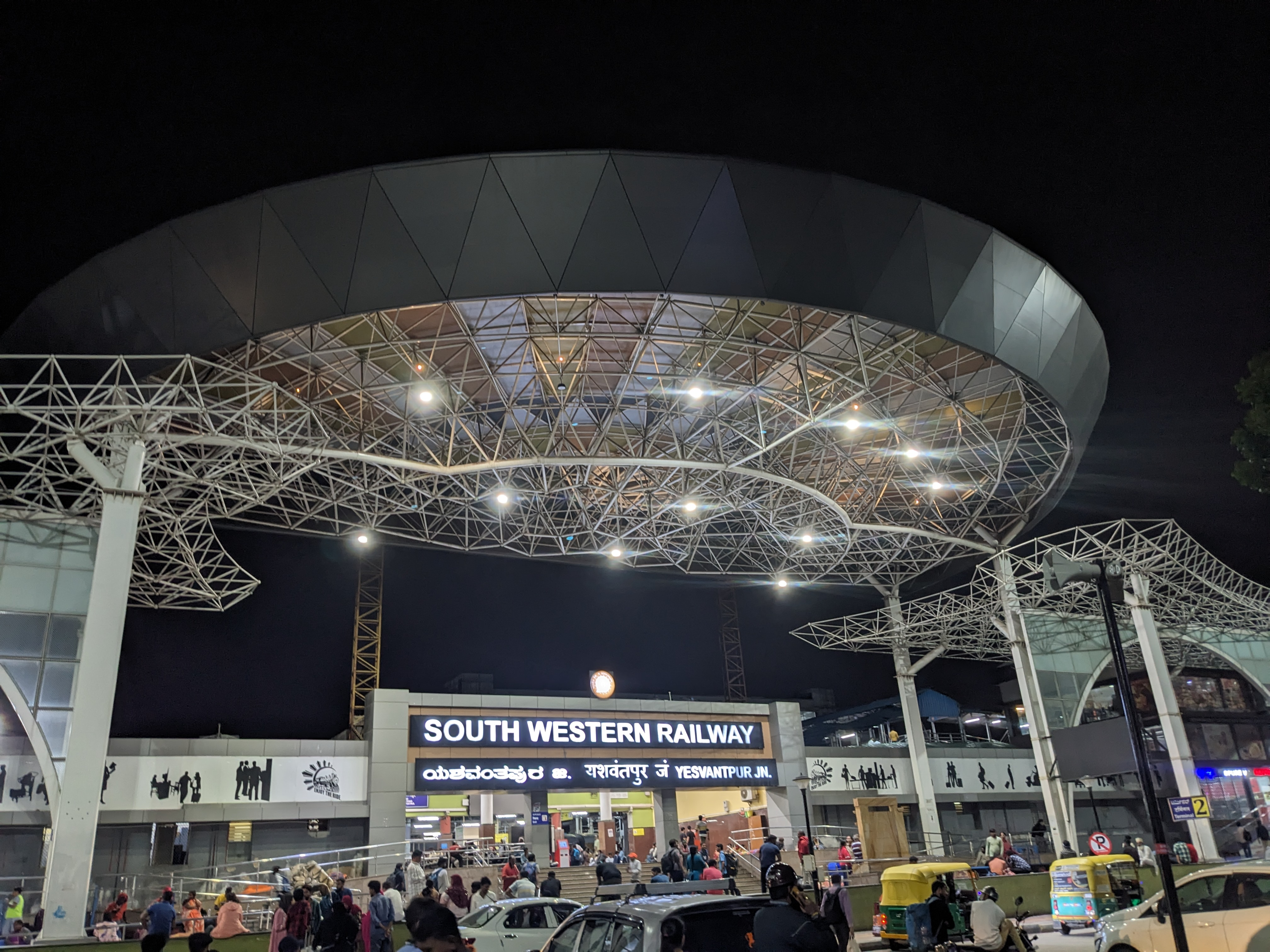
Yesvantpur Station at night

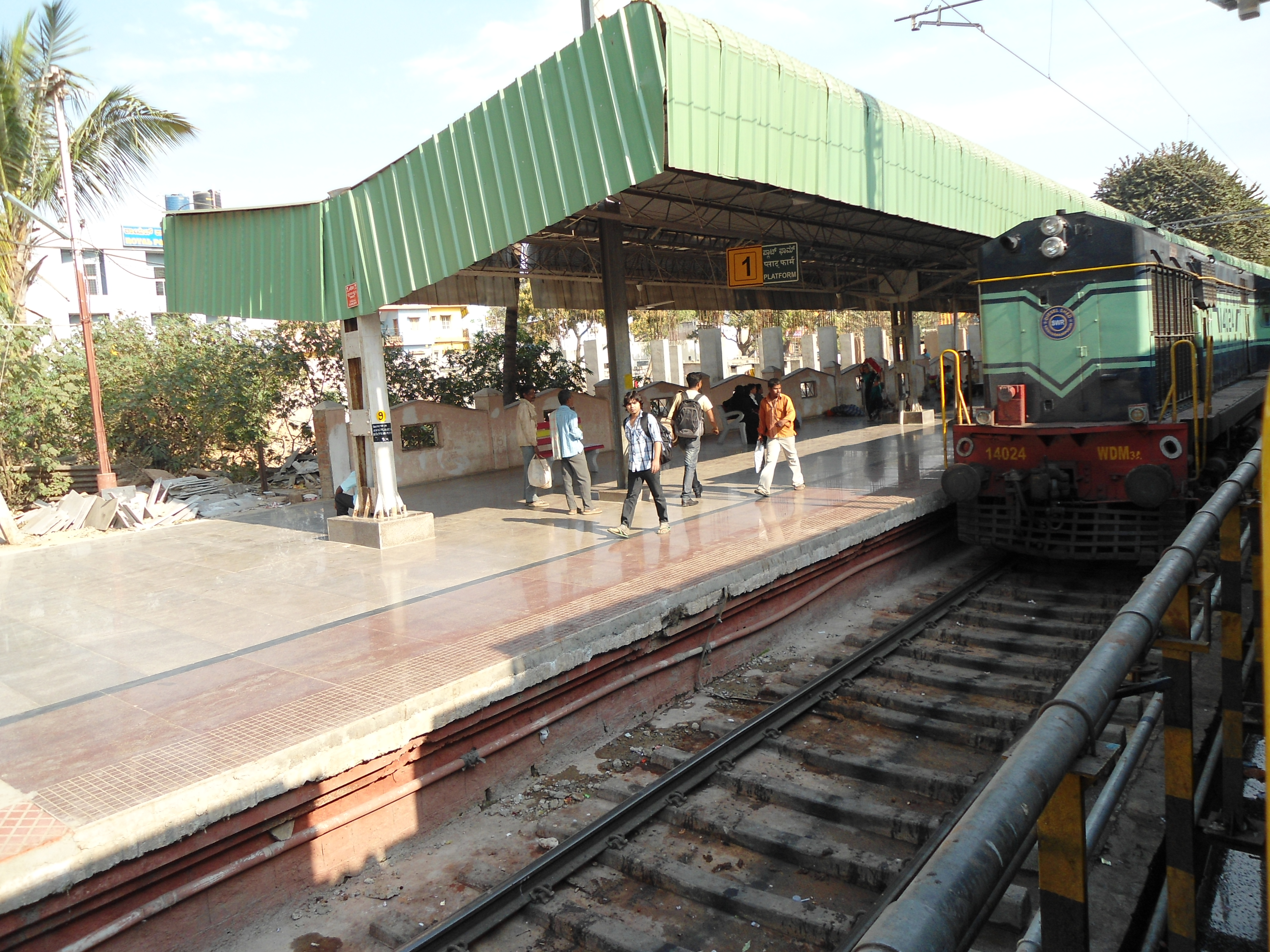
Yeswanthpur railway station

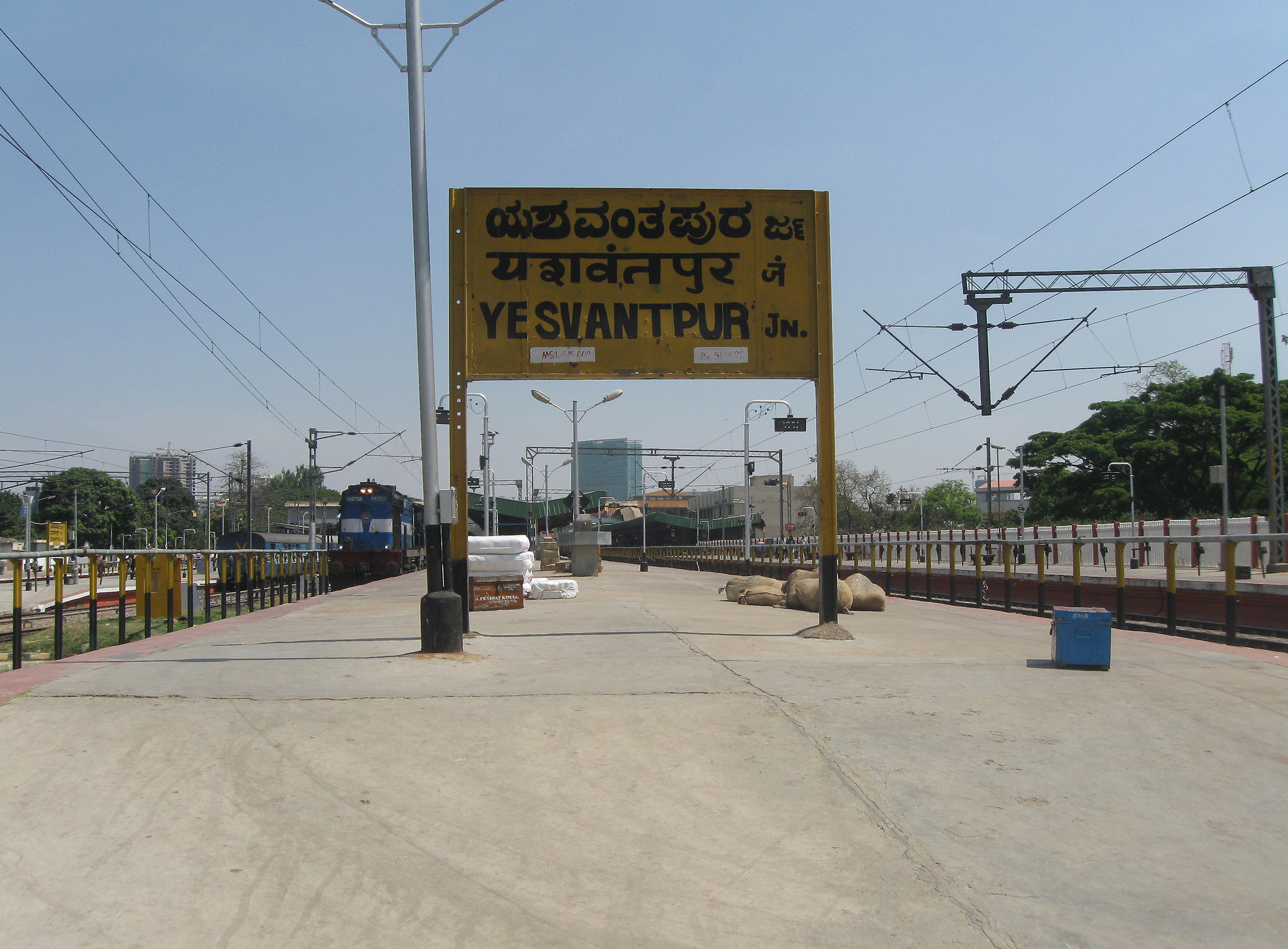
View of nameplate of Yeswanthpur railway station at Platform 5
