= Hazrat Nizamuddin–Thiruvananthapuram Rajdhani Express =

Train in India

Hazrat Nizamuddin-Thiruvananthapuram Rajdhani Express

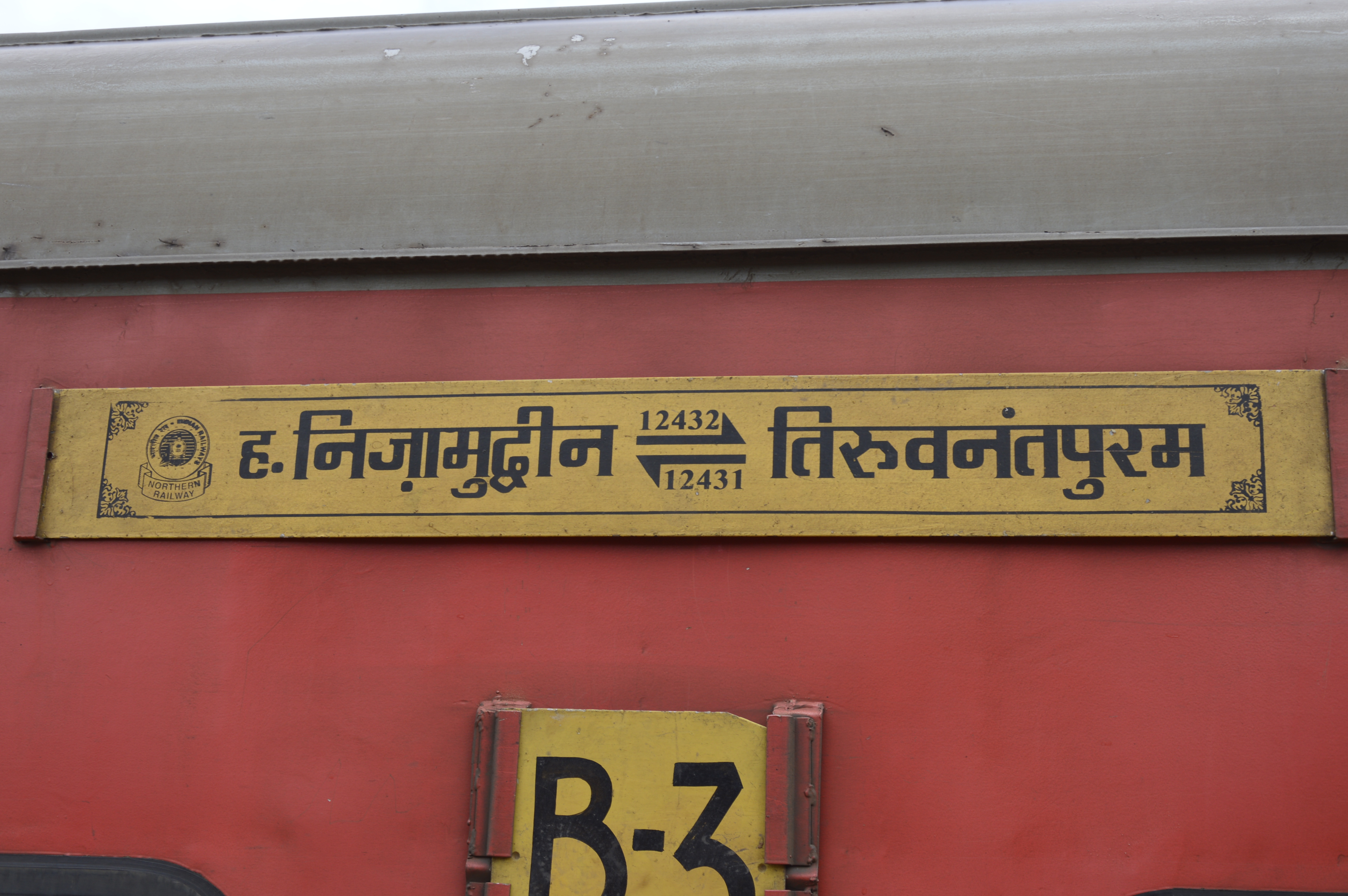
- Train board of the Thiruvananthapuram Rajdhani Express.

Overview
- Service type: Rajdhani Express
- Locale: Kerala, Karnataka, Goa, Maharashtra, Gujarat, Madhya Pradesh, Rajasthan, Uttar Pradesh, Haryana and Delhi
- First service: 3 July 1993; 33 years ago
- Current operator: Northern Railways

Route
- Termini: Thiruvananthapuram Central (TVC); Hazrat Nizamuddin (NZM)
- Stops: 21
- Distance travelled: 2,848.2 km (1,770 mi)
- Average journey time: 41 hrs 30 mins (45 hrs 00 mins in Monsoon)
- Service frequency: Tri-weekly
- Train number: 12431 / 12432

On-board services
- Classes: AC 1st Class; AC 2 Tier; AC 3 Tier
- Seating arrangements: Yes
- Sleeping arrangements: Yes
- Catering facilities: Pantry car On-board catering E-catering
- Observation facilities: Large windows
- Baggage facilities: Luggage Cum Braker van / Generator Car

Technical
- Rolling stock: LHB coach
- Track gauge: 1,676 mm (5 ft 6 in)
- Electrification: 100%
- Operating speed: 69 km/h (43 mph) average including halts (63.5 km/h (39 mph) in Monsoon)
- Rake sharing: Chennai Rajdhani Express; Secunderabad Rajdhani Express; Madgaon Rajdhani Express

The 12431 / 12432 Hazrat Nizamuddin–Thiruvananthapuram Rajdhani Express is a Rajdhani Express train service in India, connecting Hazrat Nizamuddin in the country capital New Delhi to Thiruvananthapuram Central, the capital of Kerala state. It is the Rajdhani Express with the longest route, covering 2,848.2 km (1,770 mi) in about 41 hours 30 mins running at 69 km/h (43 mph) average speed. In the Monsoon Season every year from 1st June to 31st October, this train follows a Monsoon Timetable aimed to ensure passenger safety & less operational problem due to landslides which are very common & quite frequent in occurrence in Konkan Railway route. In Monsoon season the train takes 45 hrs 30 mins as 12431 Rajdhani Express covering 2,848.2 km (1,770 mi) running at 63 km/h (39 mph) average speed and takes 44 hrs 30 mins as 12432 Rajdhani Express covering 2,848.2 km (1,770 mi) running at 64 km/h (40 mph) average speed

The train number is 12431/12432 which runs only on Tuesday, Thursday & Friday from Thiruvananthapuram Central to Hazrat Nizamuddin also it reverse runs in Sunday, Tuesday & Wednesday from Hazrat Nizamuddin to Thiruvananthapuram Central. It connects the states of Kerala, Karnataka, Goa, Maharashtra, Gujarat, Rajasthan & New Delhi.

== History ==
At the time of its introduction it was travelling from Kerala to New Delhi via Ernakulam, Erode, Chennai, Vijayawada, Nagpur, Bhopal, Jhansi & Agra having a longer time table. Timings were Nizamuddin 09.30 am, Agra 11.44 am, Jhansi 14.25 pm, Bhopal 18.05 pm, Nagpur 23.40 pm, Vijayawada 09.25 am, Chennai (Madras) arrival 15.25 pm & departure 15.55 pm, Katpadi passing 17.39 pm, Erode 21.24 pm, Ernakulam (Kochi) 02.25 am, Thiruvananthapuram (Trivandrum) 06.10 am. In return timings were Thiruvananthapuram (Trivandrum) 18.35 pm, Ernakulam (Kochi) 22.25 pm, Erode 03.31 am, Chennai (Madras) arrival 08.45 am & departure 09.10 am, Vijayawada 15.20 pm, Nagpur 01.05 pm, Bhopal 06.40 am, Jhansi 10.20 am, Agra 12.59 am, Nizamuddin 15.15 pm. It used to cover 3,091.2 km (1,921 mi) in 44 hrs 40 mins running at 69 km/h (43 mph) average speed. Until 1998, there were only three Rajdhani Express from Delhi to South India. Trivandrum Rajdhani Express was a weekly train back then having rake sharing agreement with weekly Bangalore Rajdhani Express. But after 1 April 1998, following opening of Konkan Railway it got permanently re-routed via Kota, Vadodara, Vasai, Panvel, Ratnagiri, Madgaon, Karwar, Udupi, Mangalore, Kannur, Kozhikode, Shoranur Junction, Thrissur, Ernakulam, Alappuzha & Kollam route. The timings after permanent diversion in Konkan Railway were Nizamuddin 09.45 am; Kota 14.55 pm; Vadodara 21.41 pm; Vasai Road 01.16 am; Panvel 02.35 am; Ratnagiri 07.15 am; Madgaon 10.35 am; Karwar 11.38 am; Udupi 14.20 pm, Mangalore 15.45 pm, Shoranur 21.20 pm; Ernakulam 23.30 pm; Alappuzha 00.30 am; Kollam 02.00 am, Thiruvananthapuram (Trivandrum) 03.15 am. Return timings were Thiruvananthapuram (Trivandrum) 18.35 pm; Kollam 19.43 pm; Alappuzha 21.12 pm; Ernakulam 22.15 pm; Shoranur 00.15 am; Mangalore 05.45 am; Udupi 06.59 am; Karwar 09.45 am; Madgaon 10.55 am; Ratnagiri 14.10 pm; Panvel 18.50 pm; Vasai Road 20.10 pm; Vadodara 00.55 am; Kota 07.05 am; Nizamuddin 12.05 pm; Later owing to bad timings, in 1999 timings were changed to Nizamuddin 11.15 am; Kota 16.25 pm; Vadodara 22.58 pm; Vasai Road 03.33 am; Panvel 04.53 am; Ratnagiri 09.35 am; Madgaon 12.53 am; Karwar 13.55 am; Udupi 16.38 pm, Mangalore 18.03 pm, Shoranur 23.03 pm; Ernakulam 01.13 pm; Alappuzha 02.13 am; Kollam 03.40 am, Thiruvananthapuram (Trivandrum) 04.45 am. Return timings were made Thiruvananthapuram (Trivandrum) 19.20 pm; Ernakulam 23.00 pm; Mangalore 06.20 am; Madgaon 11.30 am; Panvel 19.25 pm; Vadodara 01.25 am; Kota 07.50 am; Nizamuddin 12.50 pm.

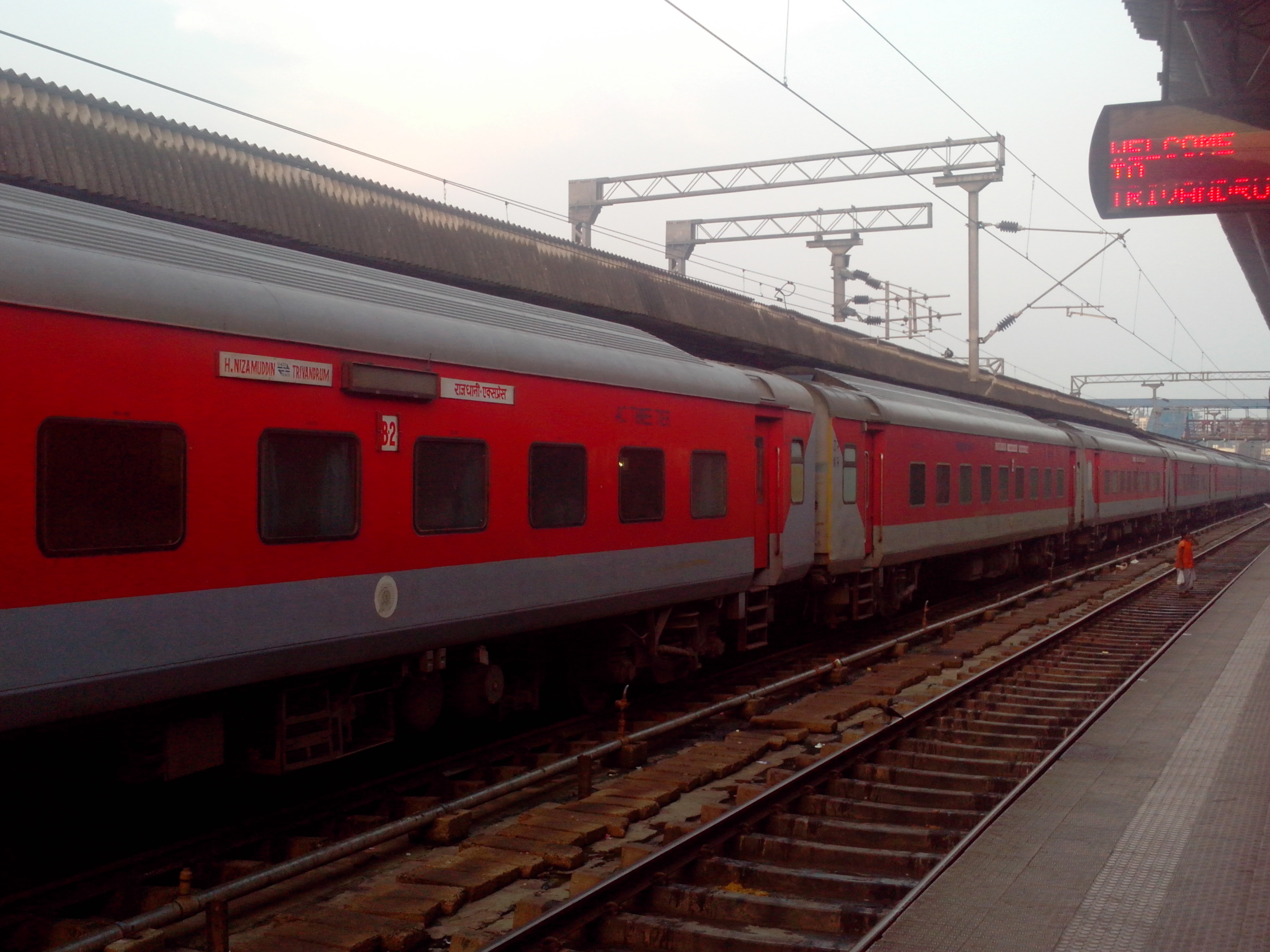
Thiruvananthapuram Rajdhani Express standing at Thiruvananthapuram Central Railway Station.

In initial days the train had very few stops. Until 1999 it was the one-stop Rajdhani between Panvel and Hazrat Nizamuddin stopping at Vadodara only. Thereafter stop of Kota was introduced in this section. Despite this the train runs non-stop between Kota Junction and Vadodara Junction section 528.3 km (328 mi), which is the longest non-stop run in the country. But from 2022 it was provided stoppage at Ratlam Junction, this making it to loose the name longest non-stop train.

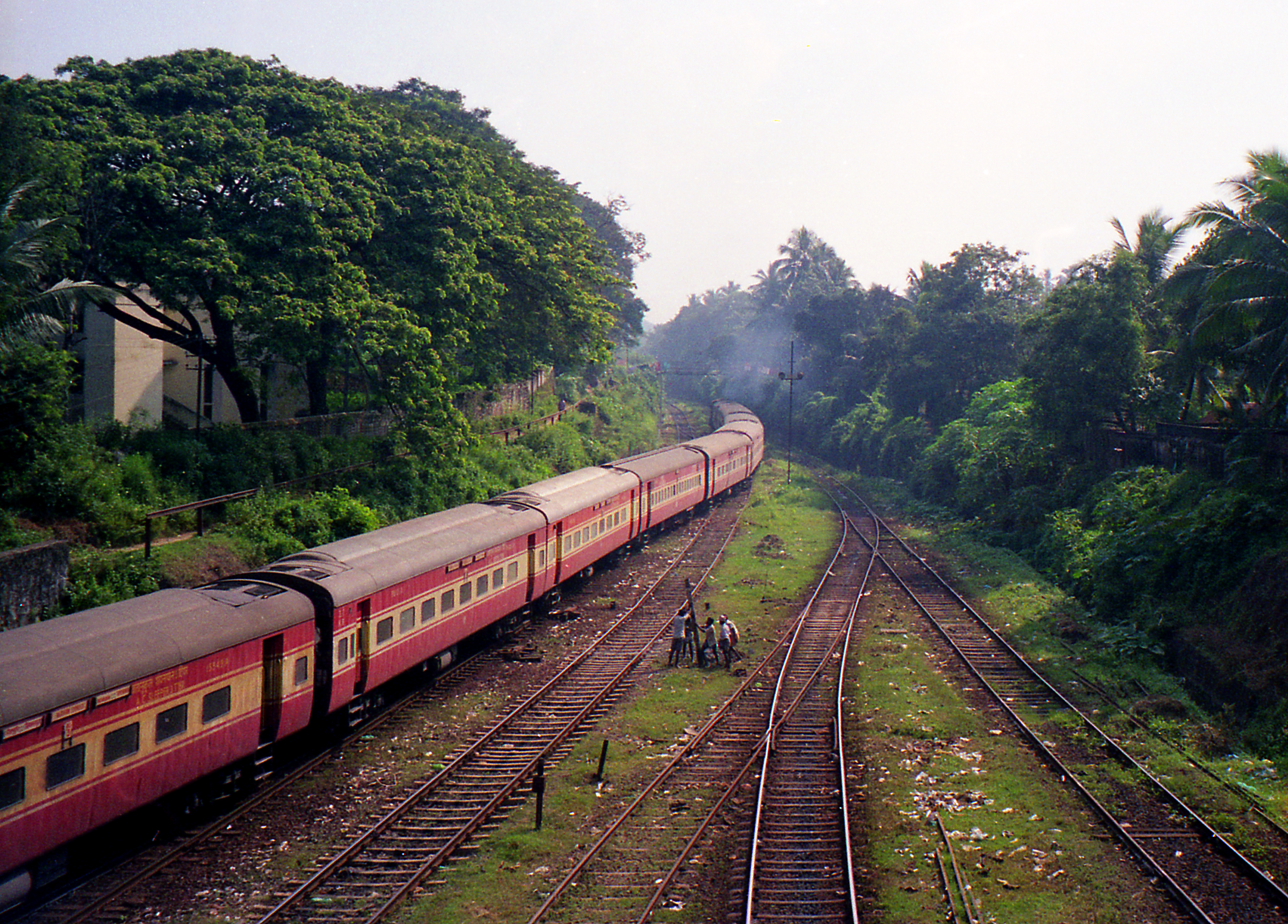
Thiruvananthapuram Rajdhani in its ICF avatar

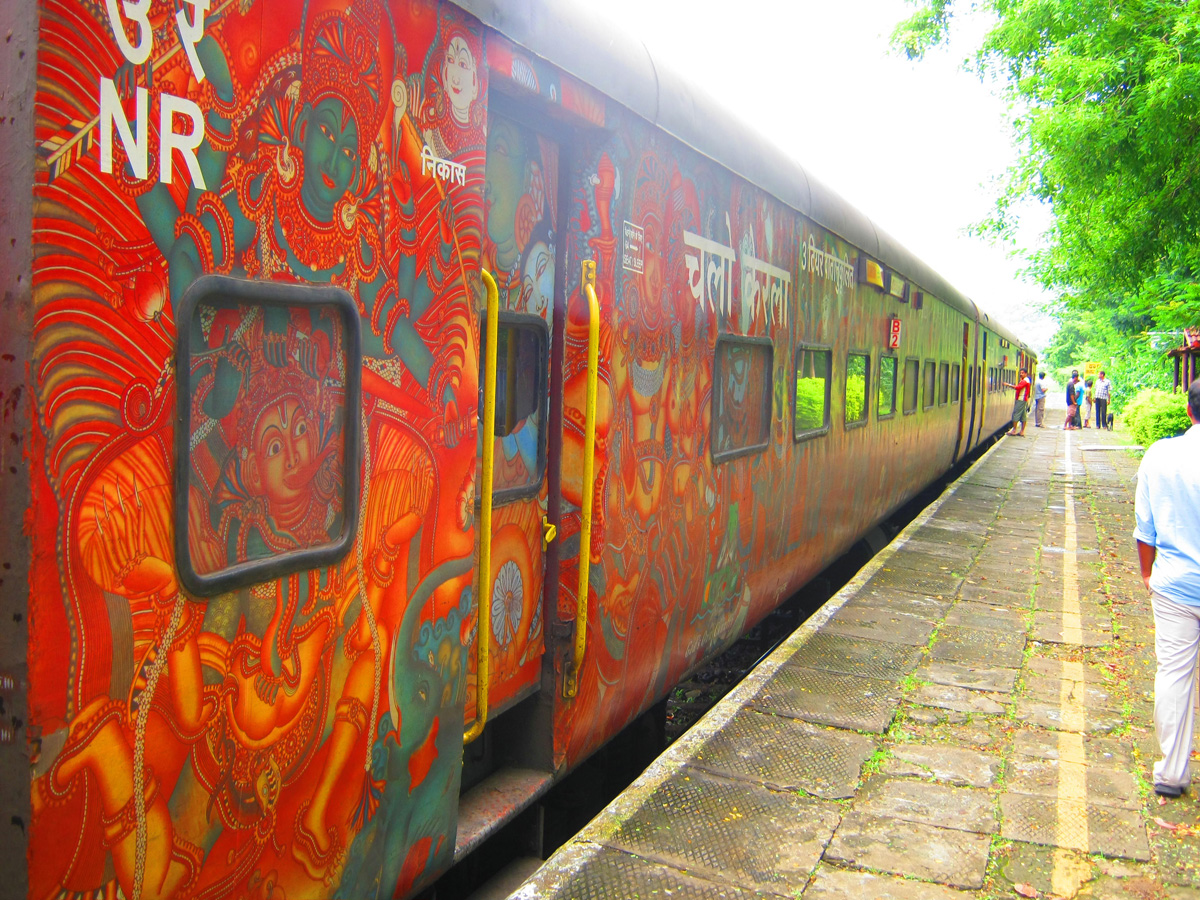
Thiruvananthapuram Rajdhani Express in its iconic Kerala Tourism vinyl wrappings.

It has a record for the highest section speed, reaching 104 km/h (65 mph) between Ratnagiri and Sawantwadi Road (225 km or 140 mi in 2 h 10 min). It also gets a top speed of 130 km/h (81 mph) between Nagda and Hazrat Nizamuddin (267 km). It moves at an average speed of 69 km/h (43 mph) between Nizamuddin and Thiruvananthapuram. In the Monsoon Season every year from 1st June to 31st October, all the trains in Konkan Railway route follows a Monsoon Timetable to ensure passenger safety & less operational problem due to landslides which are very common & quite frequent in occurrence.

Till the introduction of Madgaon Rajdhani Express in 2015, this was the sole Rajdhani Express that traversed through Konkan Railway.

== Coach composition ==
before LHB coach upgrade this train used to run in ICF coach avatar and now LHB coach was given to The Thiruvananthapuram Rajdhani generally has Two AC 1st Class, 3 AC 2 tier, 12 AC 3 tier coaches, 1 pantry car, and 2 luggage cum generator coaches making a total of 23 LHB coach. Back in 1995, the train had 11 coaches only.

It shares its rakes with Chennai Rajdhani Express, Secunderabad Rajdhani Express and Madgaon Rajdhani Express. Earlier, it also shared its rake with the Bangalore Rajdhani Express.

== Coach position ==
This coach positioning is for 12431 at Thiruvananthapuram Central.

Loco	1	2	3	4	5	6	7	8	9	10	11	12	13	14	15	16	17	18	19	20	20	22
WAP 7	EOG	H2	H1	A5	A4	A3	A2	A1	PC	B12	B11	B10	B9	B8	B7	B6	B5	B4	B3	B2	B1	EOG

Rake sharing with

- 12433/34 Chennai Central<-->Hazrat Nizamuddin Chennai Rajdhani Express
- 12437/38 Secunderabad Junction<-->Hazrat Nizamuddin Secunerabad Rajdhani Express
- 22413/14 Madgaon Junction<-->Hazrat Nizamuddin Madgaon Rajdhani Express

== Kerala ==
1. Thiruvananthapuram Central
2. Kollam Junction
3. Alappuzha
4. Ernakulam Junction
5. Thrissur
6. Shoranur Junction
7. Kozhikode
8. Kannur
9. Kasaragod

== Karnataka ==
1. Mangaluru Junction
2. Udupi
3. Karwar

== Goa ==
1. Madgaon Junction

== Maharashtra ==
1. Sawantwadi Road (experimental halt from July 2026)
2. Ratnagiri
3. Panvel
4. Vasai Road

== Gujarat ==
1. Surat Junction
2. Vadodara Junction

== Madhya Pradesh ==
1. Ratlam Junction

== Rajasthan ==
1. Kota Junction

== Delhi ==
1. Hazrat Nizamuddin

== Abstract 12431/12432 Normal Time Table ==
Up Direction:-

Station code	Station name	Arrival	Departure
TVC	Thiruvananthapuram Central		19.15
QLN	Kollam Junction	20.16	20.19
ERS	Ernakulam Junction	22.45	22.55
SRR	Shoranur Junction	00:55	01.00
MAJN	Mangaluru Junction	05.55	06.05
MAO	Madgaon Junction	11.00	11.10
PNVL	Panvel Junction	19.00	19.05
BSR	Vasai Road	20.15	20.20
ST	Surat	23.20	23.24
BRC	Vadodara Junction	00.50	01.00
RTM	Ratlam Junction	04.00	04.03
KOTA	Kota Junction	07.18	07.28
NZM	Hazrat Nizamuddin	12:45	

Down direction:-

Station code	Station name	Arrival	Departure
NZM	Hazrat Nizamuddin		06:15
KOTA	Kota Junction	11.05	11.15
RTM	Ratlam Junction	14.14	14.17
BRC	Vadodara Junction	17.30	17.40
ST	Surat	19.06	19.10
BSR	Vasai Road	22.10	22.15
PNVL	Panvel Junction	23.30	23.35
MAO	Madgaon Junction	07.25	07.35
MAJN	Mangaluru Junction	12.35	12.45
SRR	Shoranur Junction	17:40	17.45
ERS	Ernakulam Junction	19.45	19.55
QLN	Kollam Junction	22.24	22.27
TVC	Thiruvananthapuram Central	23.45	

== Abstract 12431/12432 Monsoon Timetable ==
Up Direction:-

Station code	Station name	Arrival	Departure
TVC	Thiruvananthapuram Central		14.45
QLN	Kollam Junction	15.54	15.57
ERS	Ernakulam Junction	18.25	18.35
SRR	Shoranur Junction	20:35	20.40
MAJN	Mangaluru Junction	01.35	01.45
MAO	Madgaon Junction	07.00	07.10
PNVL	Panvel Junction	16.55	17.00
BSR	Vasai Road	18.15	18.20
ST	Surat	21.53	22.02
BRC	Vadodara Junction	23.30	23.40
RTM	Ratlam Junction	03.00	03.03
KOTA	Kota Junction	06.50	07.00
NZM	Hazrat Nizamuddin	12:15	

Down direction:-

Station code	Station name	Arrival	Departure
NZM	Hazrat Nizamuddin		06:15
KOTA	Kota Junction	11.10	11.20
RTM	Ratlam Junction	14.41	14.44
BRC	Vadodara Junction	17.56	18.06
ST	Surat	19.34	19.42
BSR	Vasai Road	23.15	23.20
PNVL	Panvel Junction	00.35	00.40
MAO	Madgaon Junction	10.10	10.20
MAJN	Mangaluru Junction	15.35	15.45
SRR	Shoranur Junction	20:45	20.50
ERS	Ernakulam Junction	22.50	23.00
QLN	Kollam Junction	01.28	01.31
TVC	Thiruvananthapuram Central	02.45	

== Traction ==
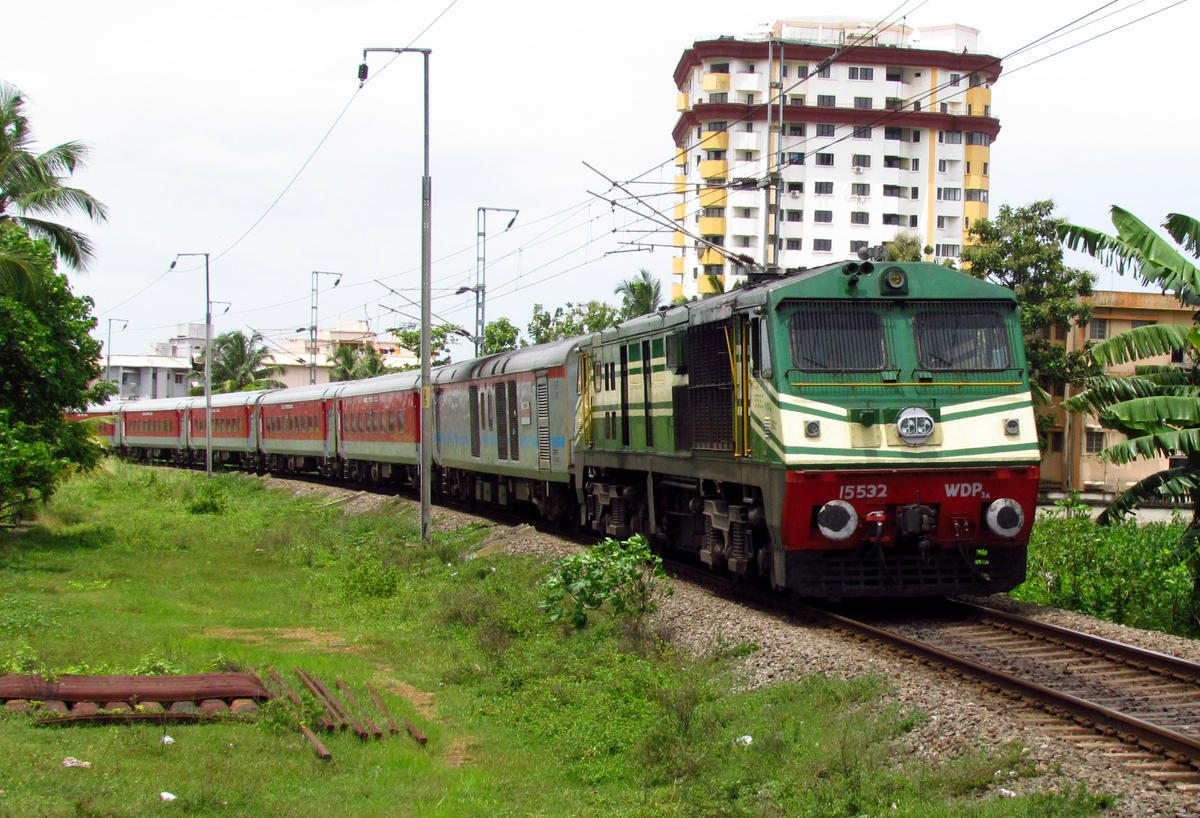
Thiruvananthapuram Rajdhani Express, hauled by the iconic WDP-3A (Toaster) locomotive, prior to the route electrification

Prior to electrification of Konkan railways, this train was hauled by WDP3A/WDP4D from Thiruvananthapuram Central to Vadodara Junction and then by WAP-7 of Vadodara shed till Hazrat Nizamuddin. With the electrification of Konkan railways, the train is end-to-end hauled by WAP-7 and WAP-5 of Ghaziabad/Tuglakabad/Vadodara shed.

== Incidents ==
- On 18 October 2018, two coaches of TVC Rajdhani derailed at a staffed level crossing at Thandla Road railway station near Ratlam when a truck rammed into the train. There were no injuries to train passengers but the truck driver was killed due to the collision. The train continued its journey after a delay of 7 hours towards New Delhi.
- On 17 May 2026, at around 05:15 AM, near Ratlam in Madhya Pradesh, the Delhi-bound Rajdhani's last three-tier AC coach (B1) caught fire and spread into the Luggage cum EOG car (SLR). Both coaches were detached from the train on time, and all the passengers were safely evacuated and accommodated in other coaches. After a delay of around 4:30 hours, the train left at around 09:45 AM towards Kota Junction, and an additional coach was added there to restore the full capacity of the train.

== See also ==
- Rajdhani Express
