= Rajdhani Express =

Series of Express trains in India

- KSR Bangalore Rajdhani Express at Itarsi Junction

Overview
- Service type: Connecting various state capitals with New Delhi
- Status: Active
- First service: 1 March 1969; 57 years ago
- Successor: Vande Bharat Sleeper Express
- Current operator: Indian Railways
- Website: indianrail.gov.in

Route
- Line used: 26

On-board services
- Classes: AC 3 tier; AC 2 tier; AC First Class
- Seating arrangements: Yes
- Sleeping arrangements: Yes
- Catering facilities: On-board catering services
- Observation facilities: Large windows, reading light
- Entertainment facilities: Electric outlets Reading lights
- Baggage facilities: Underseat

Technical
- Rolling stock: LHB; Tejas
- Track gauge: 5 ft 6 in (1,676 mm) broad gauge
- Operating speed: 110–130 km/h (68–81 mph)
- Track owner: Indian Railways
- Rake maintenance: Indian Railways

The Rajdhani Express is a series of passenger train services in India operated by the Indian Railways connecting the national capital New Delhi with the capitals or the largest cities of various states. The Sanskrit word Rajdhani means "capital". Introduced in 1969, the trains are amongst the premium services operated by Indian Railways and regularly get a higher priority on the railway network.

== History ==
In 1960, the Railway Board of India commissioned a study to increase the speed of its trains, which was restricted to 96 km/h (60 mph) on the existent broad gauge lines. A target of 160 km/h (99 mph) with an intermediate stage of 120 km/h (75 mph) was set for passenger trains. Research Design and Standards Organisation (RDSO) started work on the same in 1962 with field trials commencing in 1967. The coaches were manufactured by the Integral Coach Factory at Madras and hauled by diesel locomotives.

Guard S. O. Levi giving the green signal to start the journey of Rajdhani express on 3 March 1969 from Howrah

On 19 February 1969, the Government of India introduced a new express train capable of reaching speeds of up to 120 km/h (75 mph) as announced in the railway budget. On 1 March 1969, the first Rajdhani Express with nine coaches was flagged off from New Delhi to Howrah with the return journey commencing on 3 March. The train completed the 1,450 km (900 mi) trip in 17 hours 20 minutes and was the only such train in operation till 1972, when the second Rajdhani was introduced from Mumbai.

Rajdhani, derived from the Sanskrit means "capital" and later, with subsequent up-gradation of the tracks, new Rajdhani expresses were introduced connecting major cities with the capital New Delhi.

== Rake ==
Rajdhani trains have fully air-conditioned coaches that have to be reserved in advance. While the trains initially had chair car coaches, now the trains exclusively have sleeper coaches in three configurations: first class, two-tier and three-tier. The first class has dedicated coupes, two-tier has open bays containing six berths per bay (four berths in two tiers and two on the side of the aisle) with curtains and three-tier has open bays containing eight berths per bay (six berths in two tiers and two berths on the side of the aisle). The coaches were exclusively manufactured by Integral Coach Factory at Chennai till 2006, when LHB coaches manufactured by Rail Coach Factory, Kapurthala were introduced. As of 2018, each train-set costs ₹75 crore (US$8.0 million). While the trains are capable of running at higher speeds, the maximum speed is often limited to 130 km/h (81 mph) with the fastest Rajdhani permitted to reach a maximum speed of 130 km/h (81 mph) and average speeds being much lesser due to traffic congestion and lack of supporting tracks. earlier some Rajdhani Express trains run by diesel locomotives WDM-2, WDM-3A, WDM-3D and WDP-4/4D or a WDP-3A now the Rajdhani express trains are usually hauled by WAP-7 and WAP-5 electric locomotives.

=== Tejas-Rajdhani express ===
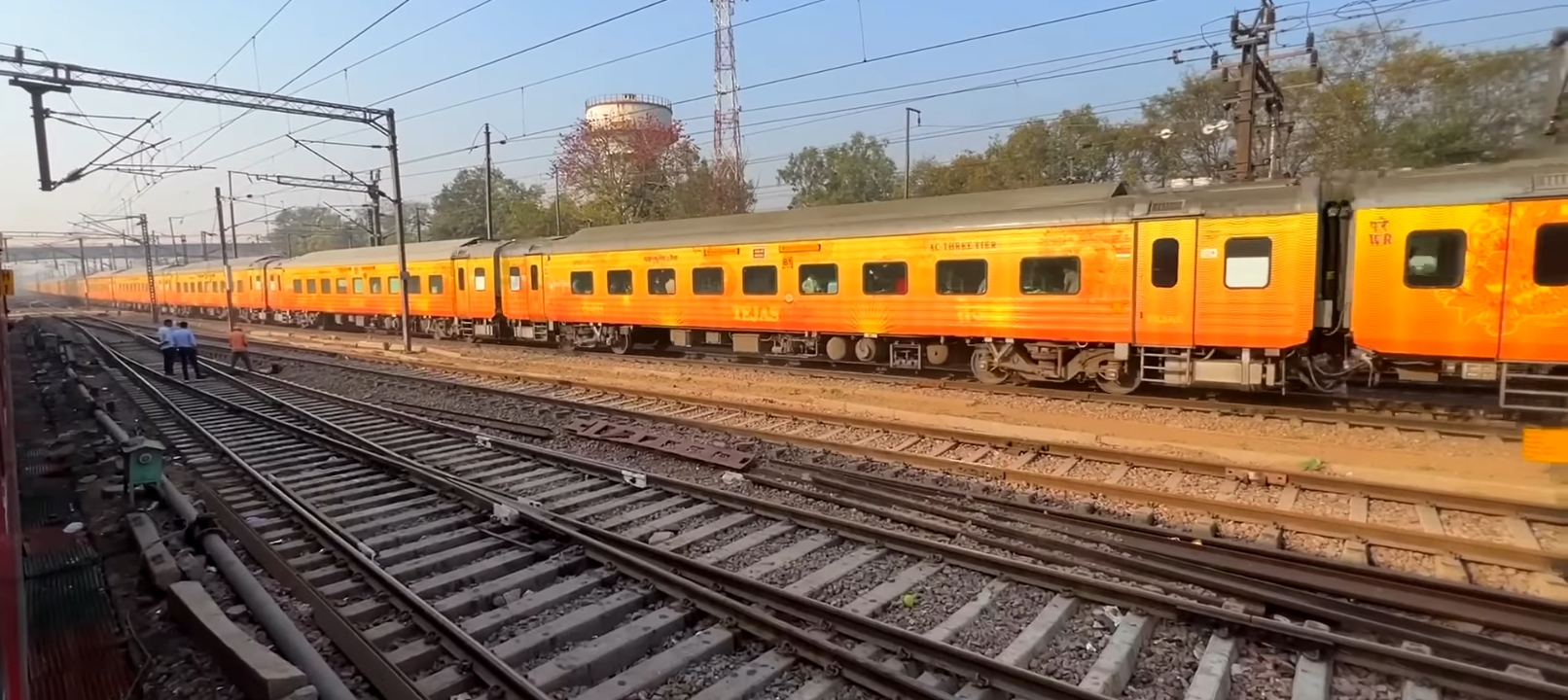
Mumbai Central–New Delhi Tejas Rajdhani Express

In July 2021, Indian railways started upgrading the coaches of Rajdhani express to new Tejas coaches with enhanced features. These coaches are equipped with newer air suspensions, bio-toilets, Wi-Fi, fire alarms, CCTVs, reading lights, dedicated power sockets, automatic doors, passenger information system, improved interior and designed exterior. The trains which are equipped with all new coaches are known as "Tejas Rajdhani" express. Indian Railways plans to introduce Tejas coaches across all Rajdhani trains in a phased manner.

== Facilities ==
The trains are amongst the premium services operated by Indian Railways and regularly gets a higher priority on the railway network. Passengers are served optional meals by Indian Railway Catering and Tourism Corporation (IRCTC), the menu of which could include morning tea, breakfast, lunch, high tea and dinner depending on the duration and timing. These trains have fewer halts than other express trains with stoppages only at prominent stations. Dynamic pricing is applicable on fares across all Rajdhani trains.

== Services ==
As of 13 September 2025, there are currently 26 operational pairs (excluding special services) of ordinary Rajdhani Express, including seven with Tejas-Rajdhani rakes:

S.No.	Train name	Tr.no.	Rake	Origin station	Terminal station	Zone	Halts	Freq.	Distance	Travel time	Speed		Inaugural run	Ref
S.No.	Train name	Tr.no.	Rake	Origin station	Terminal station	Zone	Halts	Freq.	Distance	Travel time	Max	Avg	Inaugural run	Ref
1	Howrah Rajdhani Express (via Gaya)	12301/ 12302	LHB	Howrah	New Delhi	ER	7	6 days/wk	1,451 km (902 mi)	17h 15m	130 km/h (81 mph)	84 km/h (52 mph)	3 March 1969	
2	Mumbai Tejas Rajdhani Express	12951/ 12952	Tejas	Mumbai Central	New Delhi	WR	6	Daily	1,386 km (861 mi)	15h 32m	130 km/h (81 mph)	88 km/h (55 mph)	17 May 1972	
3	August Kranti Tejas Rajdhani Express	12953/ 12954	Tejas	Mumbai Central	Hazrat Nizamuddin	WR	10	Daily	1,378 km (856 mi)	16h 33m	130 km/h (81 mph)	82 km/h (51 mph)	1 January 1992	
4	KSR Bengaluru Rajdhani Express	22691/ 22692	LHB	KSR Bengaluru	Hazrat Nizamuddin	SWR	13	Daily	2,367 km (1,471 mi)	33h 30m	130 km/h (81 mph)	71 km/h (44 mph)	1 November 1992	
5	Thiruvananthapuram Rajdhani Express	12431/ 12432	LHB	Thiruvananthapuram Central	Hazrat Nizamuddin	NR	19	Tri-weekly	2,844 km (1,767 mi)	41h 15m	130 km/h (81 mph)	69 km/h (43 mph)	3 July 1993	
6	Chennai Rajdhani Express	12433/ 12434	LHB	MGR Chennai Central	Hazrat Nizamuddin	NR	8	Bi-weekly	2,175 km (1,351 mi)	28h 25m	130 km/h (81 mph)	74 km/h (46 mph)	3 July 1993	
7	Howrah Rajdhani Express (via Patna)	12305/ 12306	LHB	Howrah	New Delhi	ER	7	Weekly	1,531 km (951 mi)	20h 00m	130 km/h (81 mph)	76 km/h (47 mph)	3 July 1993	
8	Bhubaneswar Tejas Rajdhani Express (via Adra)	22811/ 22812	Tejas	Bhubaneswar	New Delhi	ECoR	13	Bi-weekly	1,730 km (1,070 mi)	23h 20m	130 km/h (81 mph)	74 km/h (46 mph)	1 April 1994	
9	Bhubaneswar Tejas Rajdhani Express (via Tatanagar)	22824/ 22823	Tejas	Bhubaneswar	New Delhi	ECoR	13	4 days/wk	1,801 km (1,119 mi)	24h 30m	130 km/h (81 mph)	73 km/h (45 mph)	1 April 1994	
10	Dibrugarh Town – New Delhi Rajdhani Express	12423/ 12424	LHB	Dibrugarh Town	New Delhi	NR	9	Daily	2,432 km (1,511 mi)	37h 55m	130 km/h (81 mph)	64 km/h (40 mph)	6 July 1994	
11	Jammu Tawi Rajdhani Express	12425/ 12426	LHB	Jammu Tawi	New Delhi	NR	3	Daily	577 km (359 mi)	8h 20m	130 km/h (81 mph)	68 km/h (42 mph)	10 July 1994	
12	Patna Tejas Rajdhani Express	12309/ 12310	Tejas	Rajendra Nagar Terminal	New Delhi	ECR	4	Daily	1,001 km (622 mi)	12h 30m	130 km/h (81 mph)	80 km/h (50 mph)	1 September 1996	
13	Swarna Jayanti Rajdhani Express	12957/ 12958	LHB	Sabarmati Jn.	New Delhi	WR	9	Daily	929 km (577 mi)	12h 10m	130 km/h (81 mph)	77 km/h (48 mph)	1 January 1998	
14	Secunderabad Rajdhani Express	12437/ 12438	LHB	Secunderabad Jn.	Hazrat Nizamuddin	NR	5	Weekly	1,661 km (1,032 mi)	21h 40m	130 km/h (81 mph)	75 km/h (47 mph)	21 January 1998	
15	Diburgarh Rajdhani Express (via Rangapara North)	20505/ 20506	LHB	Dibrugarh	New Delhi	NFR	23	Bi-weekly	2,294 km (1,425 mi)	39h 38m	110 km/h (68 mph)	58 km/h (36 mph)	11 January 1999	
16	Sealdah Rajdhani Express	12313/ 12314	LHB	Sealdah	New Delhi	ER	6	Daily	1,458 km (906 mi)	18h 00m	130 km/h (81 mph)	81 km/h (50 mph)	1 July 2000	
17	Ranchi Rajdhani Express (via Bokaro)	20839/ 20840	LHB	Ranchi	New Delhi	SER	6	Bi-weekly	1,307 km (812 mi)	17h 00m	130 km/h (81 mph)	76 km/h (47 mph)	17 October 2001	
18	Bilaspur Rajdhani Express	12441/ 12442	LHB	Bilaspur Jn.	New Delhi	NR	8	Bi-weekly	1,505 km (935 mi)	20h 40m	130 km/h (81 mph)	73 km/h (45 mph)	28 October 2001	
19	Ranchi Rajdhani Express (via Japla)	20407/ 20408	LHB	Ranchi	New Delhi	NR	6	Weekly	1,251 km (777 mi)	16h 45m	130 km/h (81 mph)	75 km/h (47 mph)	11 June 2006	
20	Ranchi Rajdhani Express (via Chopan)	12453/ 12454	LHB	Ranchi	New Delhi	NR	7	Weekly	1,244 km (773 mi)	17h 55m	130 km/h (81 mph)	69 km/h (43 mph)	11 June 2006	
21	Dibrugarh Rajdhani Express (via Moranhat)	20504/ 20503	LHB	Dibrugarh	New Delhi	NFR	22	5 days/wk	2,471 km (1,535 mi)	41h 15m	110 km/h (68 mph)	59 km/h (37 mph)	6 March 2010	
22	Madgaon Rajdhani Express	22414/ 22413	LHB	Madgaon Jn.	Hazrat Nizamuddin	NR	9	Bi-weekly	1,909 km (1,186 mi)	24h 54m	130 km/h (81 mph)	72 km/h (45 mph)	20 November 2015	
23	Agartala Tejas Rajdhani Express	20501/ 20502	Tejas	Agartala	Anand Vihar Terminal	NFR	14	Weekly	2,594 km (1,612 mi)	43h 15m	130 km/h (81 mph)	59 km/h (37 mph)	28 October 2017	
24	Bhubaneswar Tejas Rajdhani Express (via Sambalpur)	20817/ 20818	Tejas	Bhubaneswar	New Delhi	ECoR	14	Weekly	1,914 km (1,189 mi)	26h 40m	130 km/h (81 mph)	70 km/h (43 mph)	10 February 2018	
25	Mumbai CSMT Rajdhani Express	22221/ 22222	LHB	Mumbai CSMT	Hazrat Nizamuddin	CR	8	Daily	1,537 km (955 mi)	17h 55m	130 km/h (81 mph)	84 km/h (52 mph)	19 January 2019	
26	Sairang Rajdhani Express	20507/ 20508	LHB	Sairang (Aizawl, Mizoram)	Anand Vihar Terminal	NFR	18	Weekly	2,510 km (1,560 mi)	42h 15m	130 km/h (81 mph)	58 km/h (36 mph)	13 September 2025	

== Trivia ==
- The Bilaspur Rajdhani Express is the First Rajdhani Express in India that undergoes loco reversal, which happens at Nagpur Junction railway station.
- The First Rajdhani Express to operate from Anand Vihar Terminal railway station is 20501/20502 Agartala Tejas Rajdhani Express.
- The Second Rajdhani Express to operate from Anand Vihar Terminal railway station is the 20507/20508 Sairang Rajdhani Express. This is also the Second Rajdhani Express in India that undergo loco reversal, which happens at Badarpur Railway Station at Assam.
- 12301/12302 Howrah Rajdhani used to take 16 hrs 55 mins to cover the 1,451 kilometres (902 mi) distance running at 86.22 kilometres per hour (53.57 mph) speed in period from 2006–2016. The train was slowed down by 15 mins due to safety and operational reasons.
- 12951/52 Mumbai Rajdhani is the First Rajdhani Express in India which received LHB coach in late 2003.
- Only Kolkata, Mumbai, Bhubaneswar, Ranchi, Dibrugarh currently has three pairs of end to end (E2E) Rajdhani Express Service.

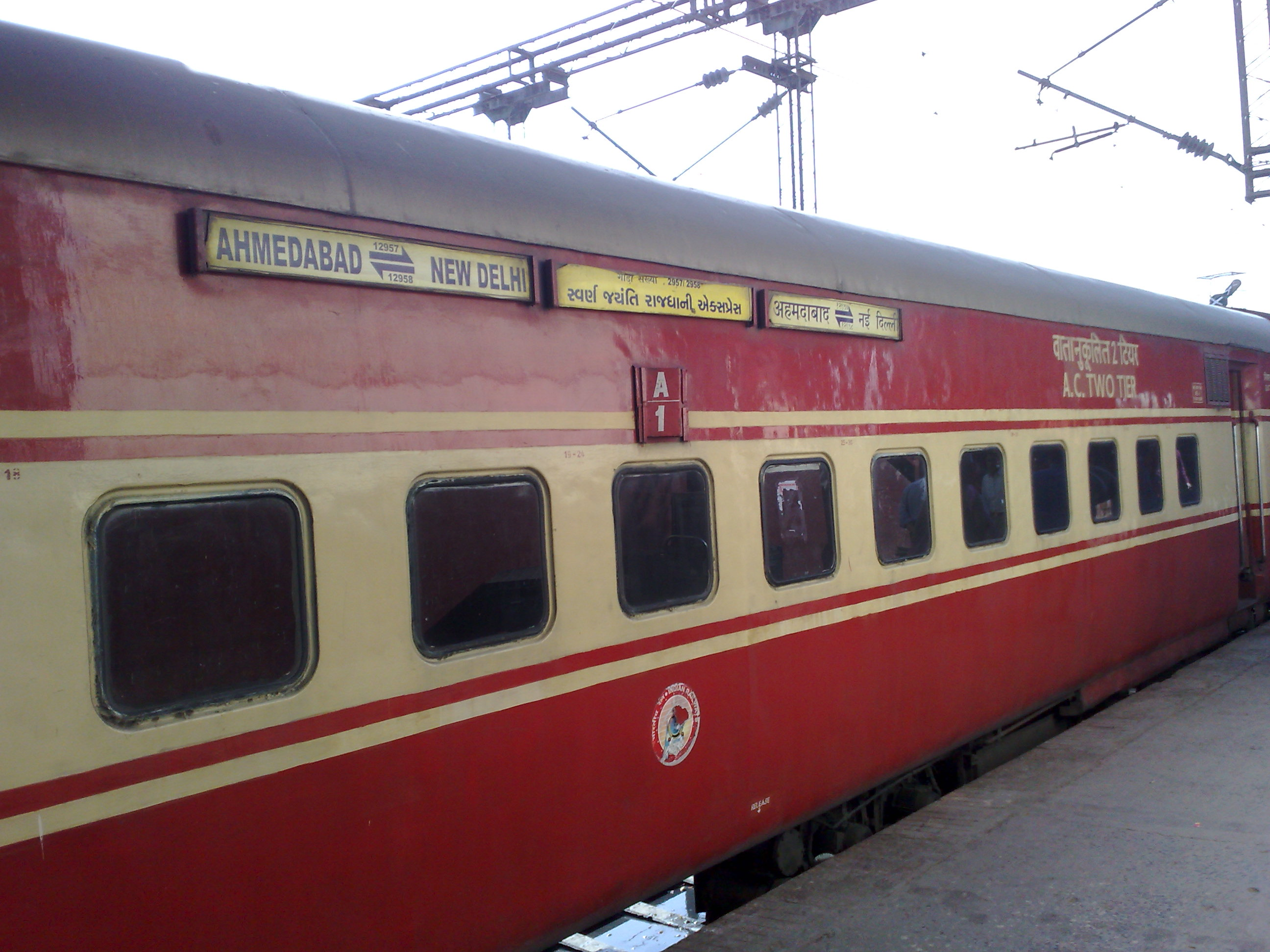
Ahmedabad – New Delhi Rajdhani Express

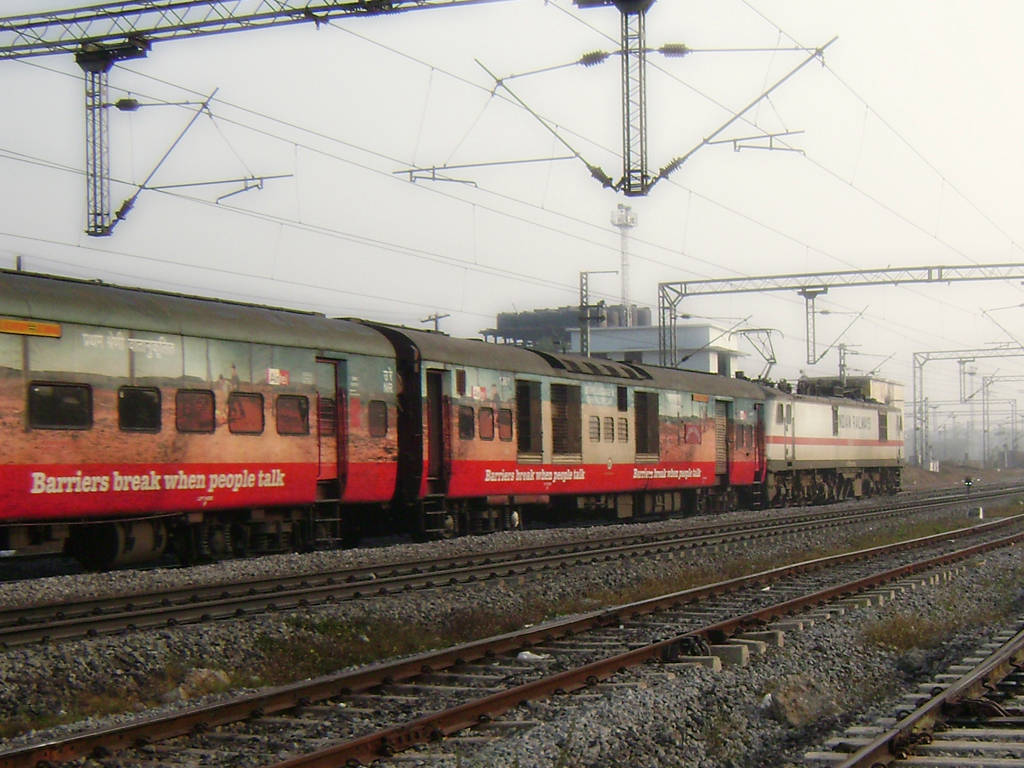
Secunderabad–Hazrat Nizamuddin Rajdhani Express with a WAP-7 at Moula Ali

== Accidents and incidents ==
- On 9 September 2002, at least 140 people were killed when the Howrah–New Delhi Rajdhani Express derailed near Rafiganj, Bihar due to sabotage by Naxalites.
- On 27 October 2009, Bhubaneswar Rajdhani Express was hijacked by hundreds of armed activists of the Maoist-backed People's Committee against Police Atrocities (PCPA) who forced the train to stop at Banshtala near Jhargram in West Midnapore district of West Bengal and demanded the release of Chhatradhar Mahato. The Maoists fled on the arrival of Central Reserve Police Force and all passengers were rescued without any casualties.
- On 18 April 2011, three coaches of Mumbai Rajdhani Express caught fire, including the pantry car, at 2:20 hrs at Thuriya near Ratlam in Madhya Pradesh. Three coaches were written off but there were no casualties.
- On 25 June 2014, at least four passengers were killed and eight injured when the Dibrugarh Rajdhani Express derailed at Goldin Ganj near Chhapra, Bihar in suspected sabotage by Maoists.
- On 7 September 2017, Ranchi Rajdhani Express derailed at New Delhi railway station. No one was injured in the incident.
- On 14 September 2017, Jammu Tawi Rajdhani Express derailed at the New Delhi railway station when entering the platform. No one was injured.
- On 18 October 2018, two coaches of Thiruvananthapuram Rajdhani Express derailed at the staffed level crossing near Ratlam in Madhya Pradesh when a speeding truck collided with train due to brake failure. There were no injuries to the passengers in the train, but the truck driver was killed due to the collision. The train continued the journey after a delay of seven hours.
- On 3 April 2019, two coaches of Bhubaneswar Rajdhani Express uncoupled on the Kathajodi River bridge near Cuttack in Odisha. The train was halted and there were no casualties.
- On 11 May 2019, a fire broke out at the generator car of Bhubaneswar Rajdhani near Balasore in Odisha. There were no casualties and the train continued its journey after a delay of two hours.
- On 20 December 2025, the Sairang-Anand Vihar Terminal Rajdhani Express in Assam's Lumding division hit a herd of elephants which were crossing the railway tracks. Five coaches, including the engine, were derailed. Seven elephants were killed, and one was injured. However, no passengers were injured.
- On 17 May 2026, a fire broke out in the B1 coach and the adjacent generator car of the Thiruvananthapuram–Hazrat Nizamuddin Rajdhani Express between Luni Richha and Vikramgarh Alot stations under the Kota Division of West Central Railway in Madhya Pradesh, approximately 110 kilometres from Ratlam. The fire spread rapidly, engulfing the AC three-tier coach and the adjoining generator car in massive flames that were visible from a considerable distance. Railway authorities halted the train and safely evacuated passengers, and no casualties or injuries were reported.

== In popular culture ==
Being one of the most popular trains in India, the train's name featured as a title of a Bollywood movie, Rajdhani Express. A Bollywood movie titled The Burning Train featuring Dharmendra, Jeetendra and Vinod Khanna.

== See also ==
- Vande Bharat Express
- Vande Bharat Sleeper Express
- Amrit Bharat Express
- Namo Bharat Rapid Rail
- Tejas Express
- Uday Express
- Mahamana Express
- Humsafar Express
- Antyodaya Express
- Sampark Kranti Express
- Jan Shatabdi Express
- Jan Sadharan Express
- Duronto Express
- Vivek Express
- Yuva Express
- Kavi Guru Express
- Garib Rath Express
