= Madgaon–Hazrat Nizamuddin Rajdhani Express =

Train connecting Goa with New Delhi

Madgaon Rajdhani Express

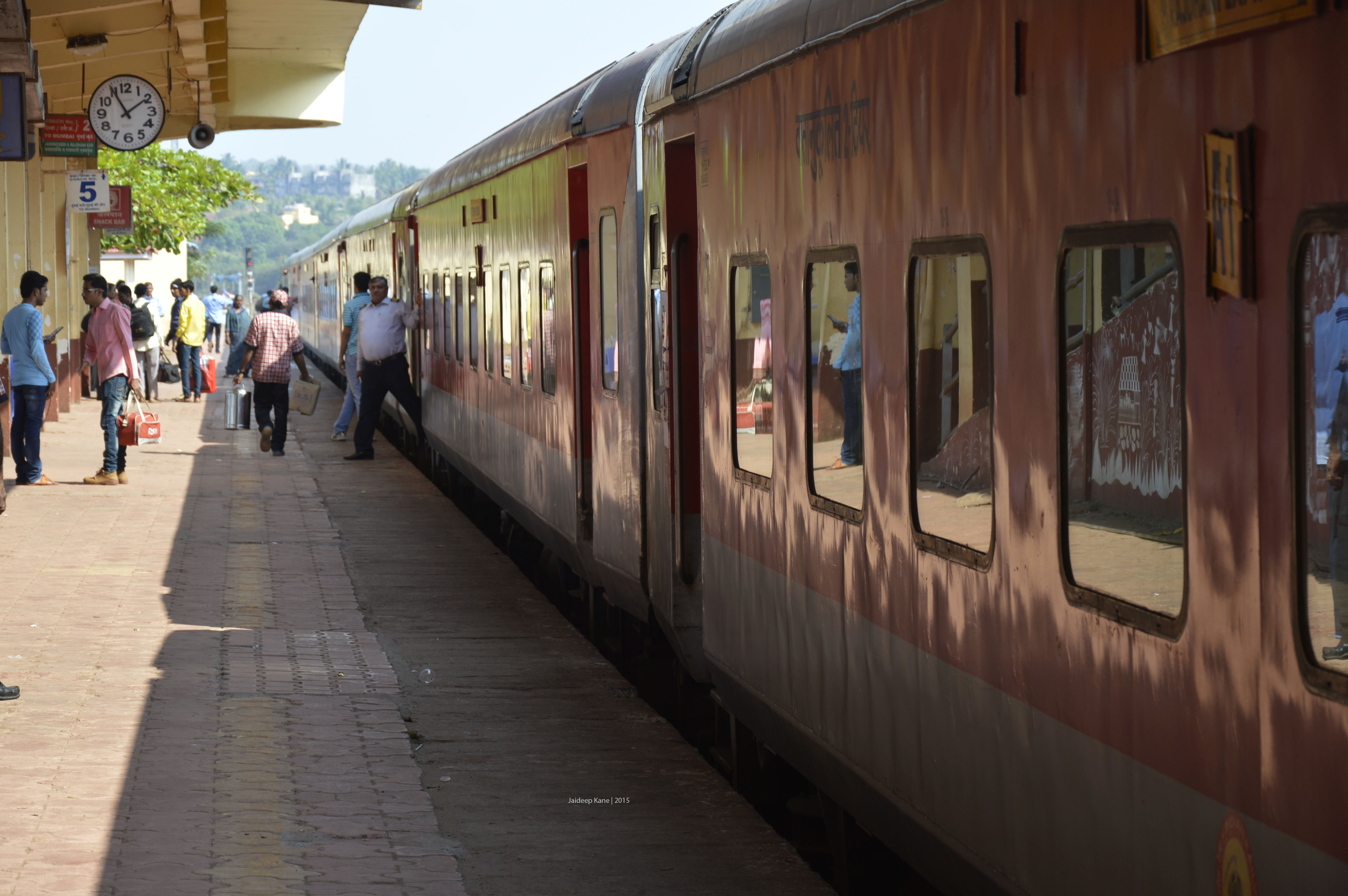

Overview
- Service type: Rajdhani Express
- Locale: Goa, Maharashtra, Gujarat, Rajasthan, Uttar Pradesh, Haryana & Delhi
- First service: 15 November 2015; 11 years ago
- Current operator: Northern Railways

Route
- Termini: Madgaon Junction (MAO); Hazrat Nizamuddin (NZM)
- Stops: 9
- Distance travelled: 1,910.2 km (1,187 mi)
- Average journey time: 26 hours, 35 minutes
- Service frequency: 2 times a week
- Train number: 22413/ 22414

On-board services
- Classes: AC 1st Class, AC 2 Tier, AC 3 Tier
- Seating arrangements: No
- Sleeping arrangements: Yes
- Catering facilities: Pantry car On-board Catering; E-Catering
- Observation facilities: Large windows
- Baggage facilities: Yes

Technical
- Rolling stock: LHB coach
- Track gauge: 1,676 mm (5 ft 6 in)
- Operating speed: 72 km/h (45 mph) average with halts
- Rake sharing: Thiruvananthapuram Rajdhani Express; Chennai Rajdhani Express; Secunderabad Rajdhani Express
Route map
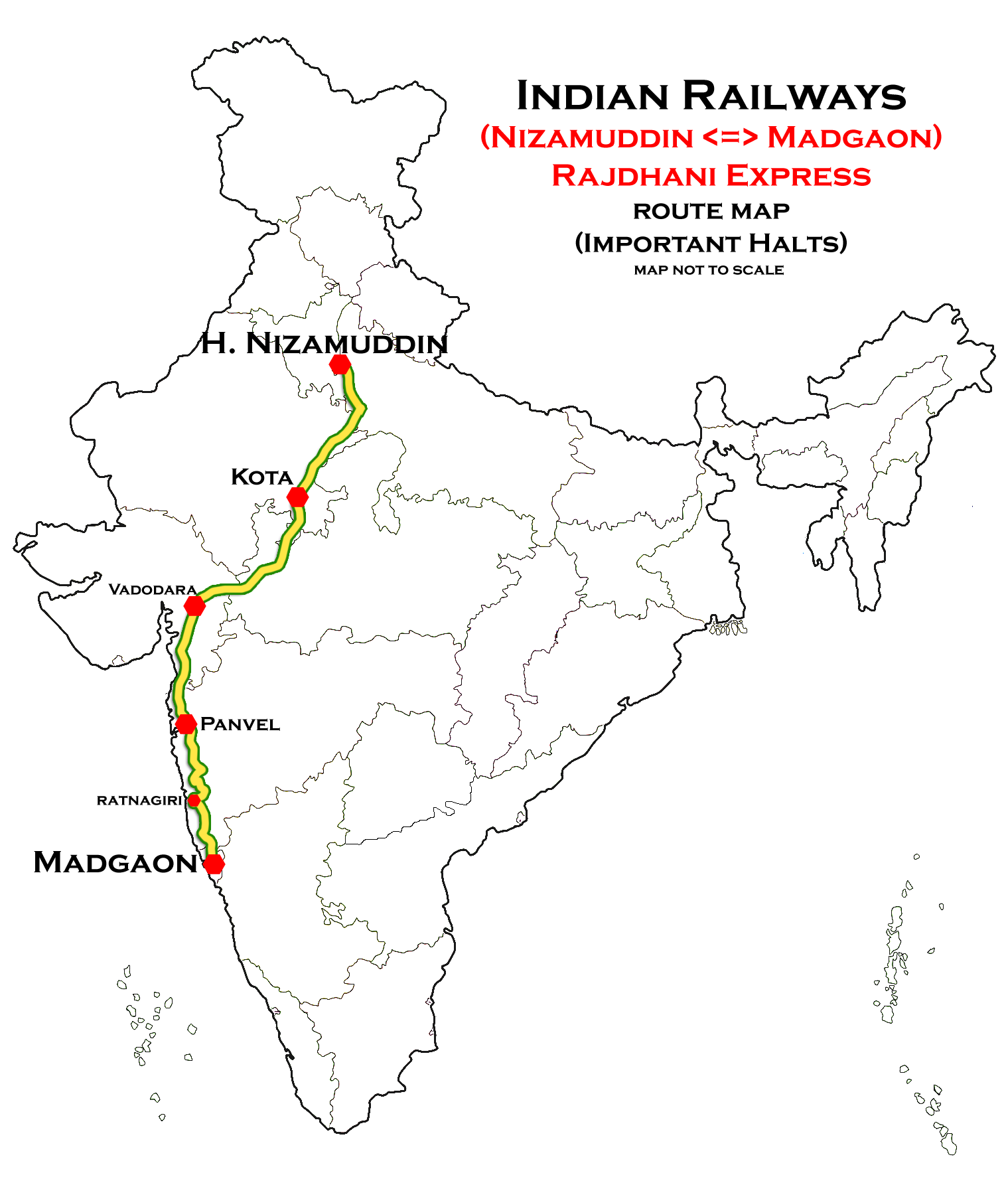

The 22413/22414 Madgaon Rajdhani Express is an express train of Rajdhani class belonging to Indian Railways connecting the national capital New Delhi to Madgaon, in the state of Goa. It was introduced on 15 November 2015 and runs twice a week between Madgaon Junction and Hazrat Nizamuddin.
