= Jammu Tawi Rajdhani Express =

Train in India

Jammu Tawi–New Delhi Rajdhani Express

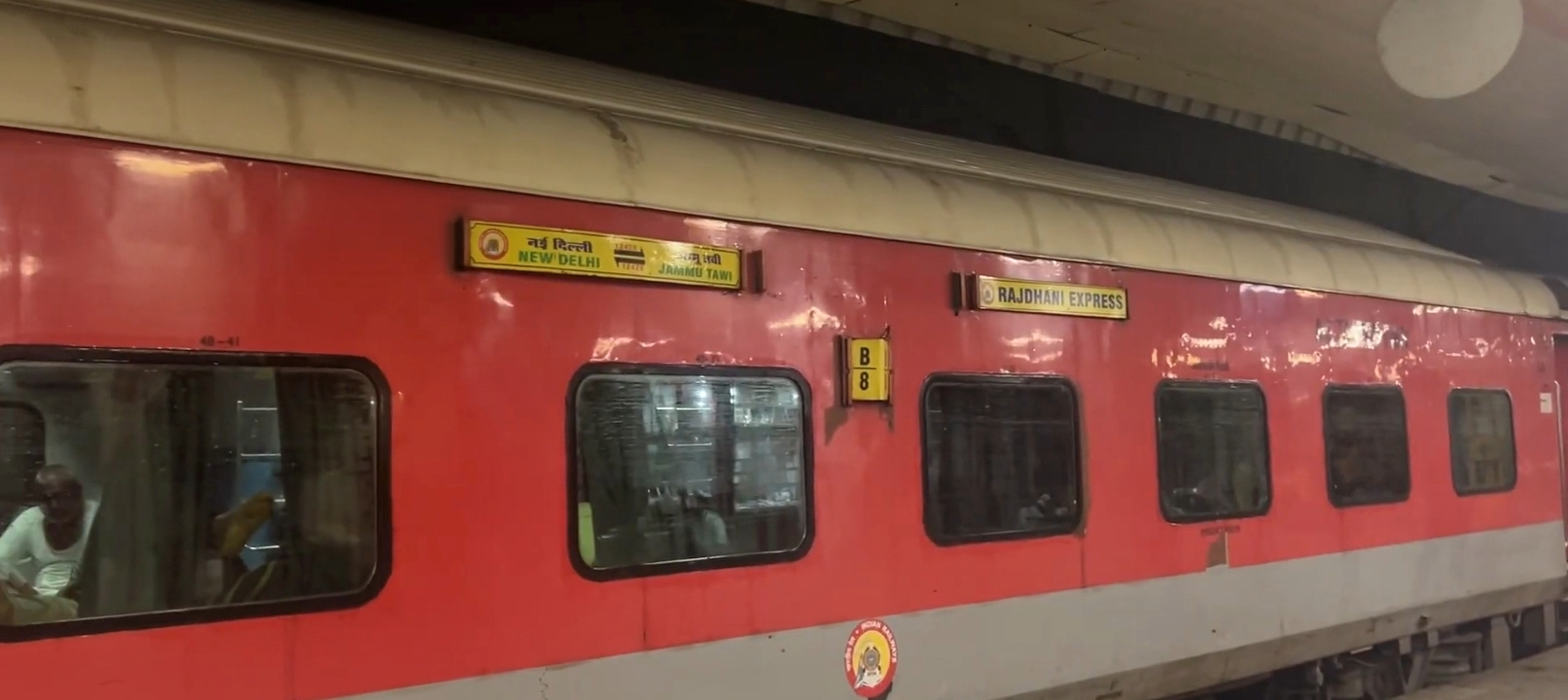
- Jammu Tawi-New Delhi Rajdhani Express Arrived At Ambala cantt Junction

Overview
- Service type: Rajdhani Express
- First service: July 10, 1994; 32 years ago
- Current operator: Northern Railway zone

Route
- Termini: New Delhi (NDLS); Jammu Tawi (JAT)
- Stops: 3
- Distance travelled: 577 km (359 mi)
- Average journey time: 09 hrs 15 mins
- Service frequency: Daily
- Train number: 12425 / 12426
- Lines used: Delhi–Kalka (till Ambala Cantt.); Ambala–Amritsar line (till Jalandhar Cantt. Jn.); Jalandhar–Jammu Tawi line

On-board services
- Classes: AC 1st Class, AC 2 Tier, AC 3 Tier
- Seating arrangements: Yes
- Sleeping arrangements: Yes
- Catering facilities: Pantry car On-board catering E-catering
- Observation facilities: Large windows
- Entertainment facilities: Yes(1A)
- Baggage facilities: Yes

Technical
- Rolling stock: LHB Coaches
- Track gauge: 1,676 mm (5 ft 6 in)
- Electrification: Single-phase 25 kV, 50 Hz AC through overhead catenary
- Operating speed: 69 km/h (43 mph) average with halts, 130 km/h (81 mph)maximum
Route map
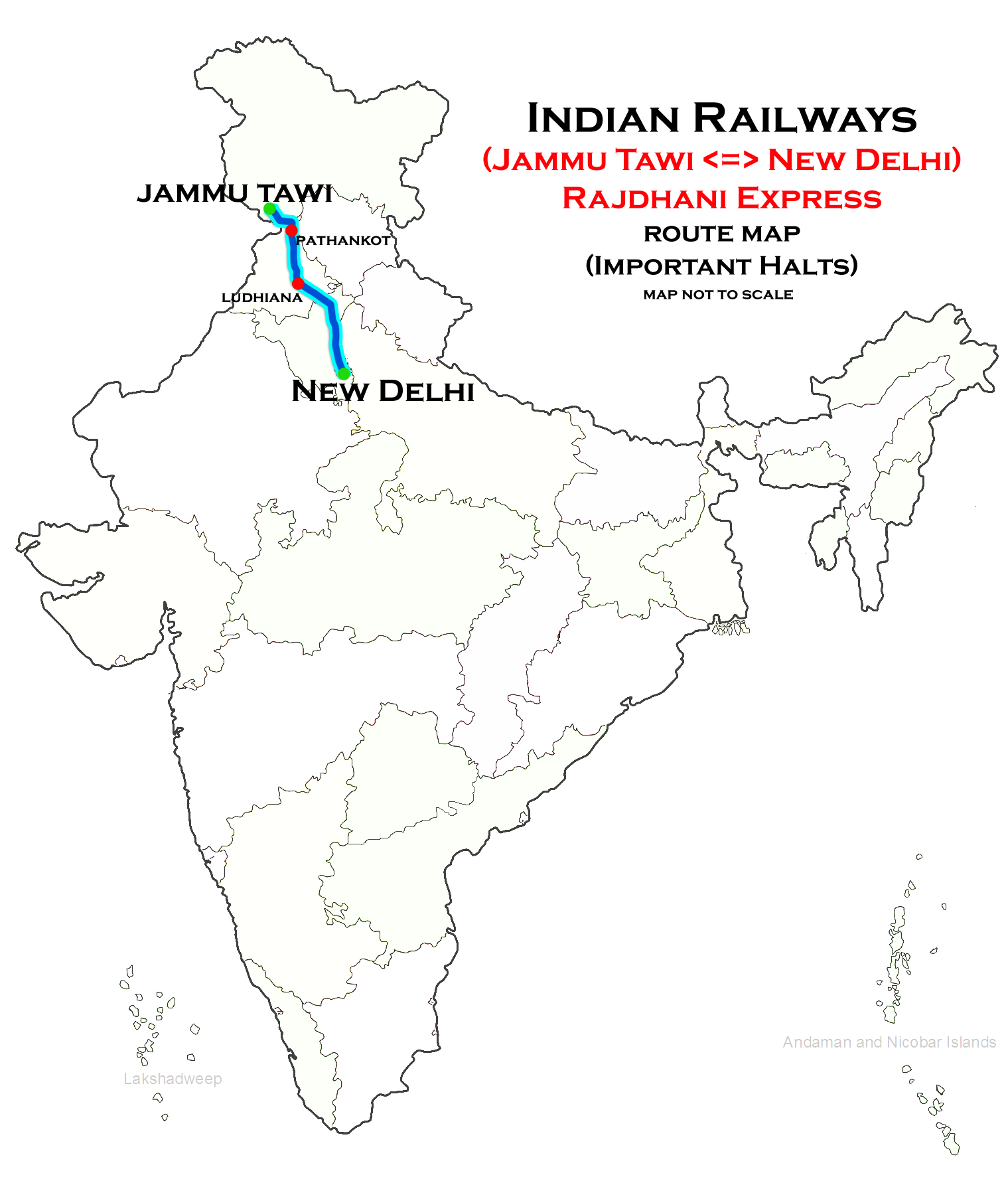
↓ 12426 • 12425 ↑

The New Delhi–Jammu Tawi Rajdhani Express connects New Delhi and Jammu Tawi. It is the Rajdhani Express series train on the New Delhi–Jammu Tawi section. Its number is 12425 / 12426.

== Service ==
This train was introduced on 10 July 1994. The 12425 / 12426 Rajdhani Express is the fastest train on the Jammu Tawi–New Delhi section. It used to run weekly once until 2009. In 2009 its frequency was increased from weekly to daily.

It operates daily as train number 12426 from Jammu Tawi to New Delhi railway station and as train number 12425 in the reverse direction. It covers a distance of 577 kilometres in each direction however it takes 9 hours 15 mins when operating as train number 12426 at an average speed of 75 km/h (excluding halts) while its return journey takes 9 hrs at an average speed of 74 km/h (excluding halts).

== Halts ==
It has 3 halts in either direction at Kathua, Pathankot Cantonment railway station, and Ludhiana.

It is the shortest Rajdhani Express in terms of distance and time. It is also the only Rajdhani Express that travels north from Delhi.

== Loco link and rake ==
This train used to run with ICF coach before 15 June 2013.It now runs with LHB rakes. This train comprises all AC LHB rakes. Jammu Rajdhani Express runs with Ghaziabad-based WAP-7 Tuglakabad-based WAP-7 electric loco.Earlier before electrification this train was hauled by a WDM3A or WDM3D locomotive.

== Gallery ==
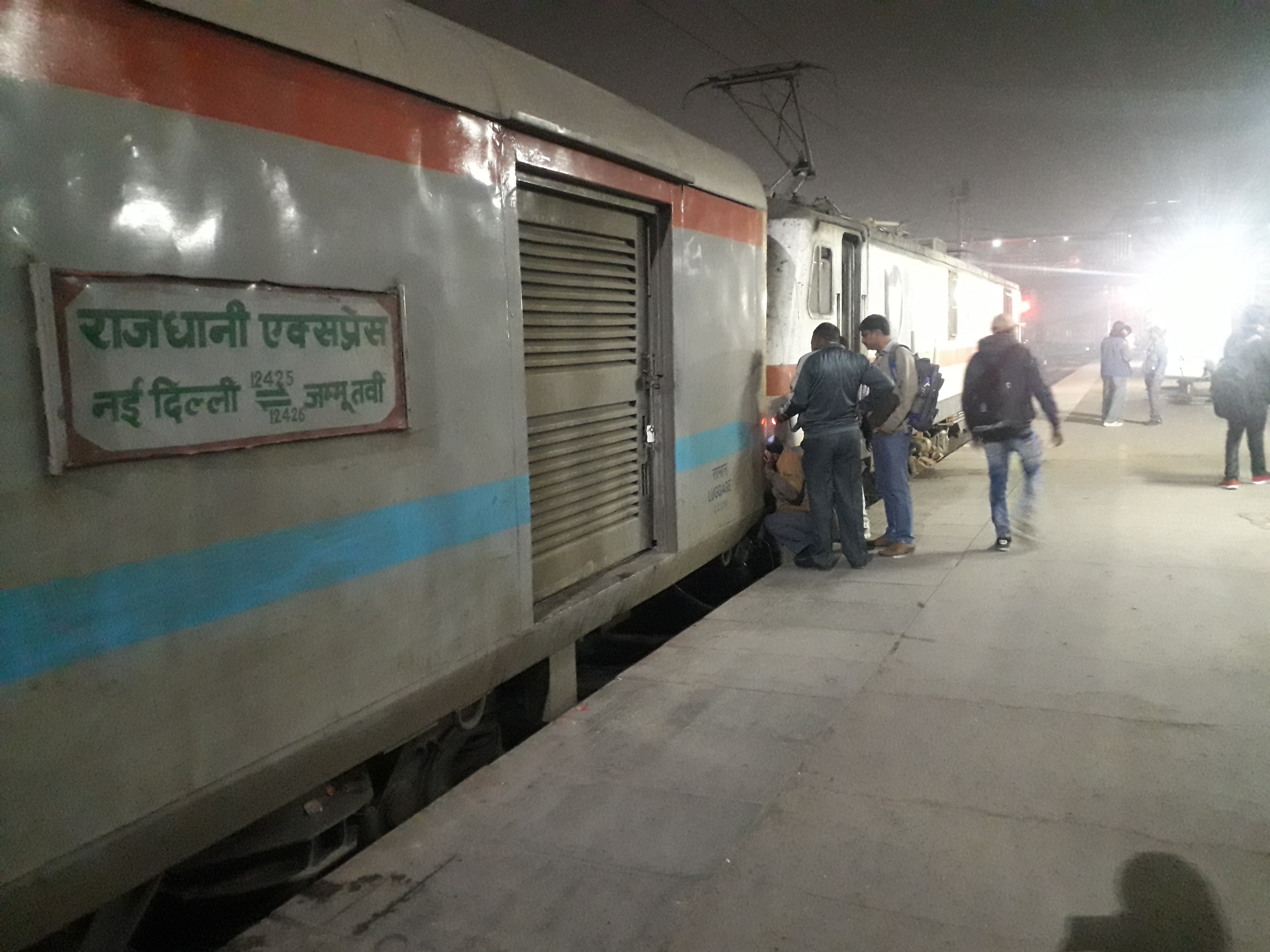
12425 Jammu Rajdhani Express with Ghaziabad Junction WAP-7

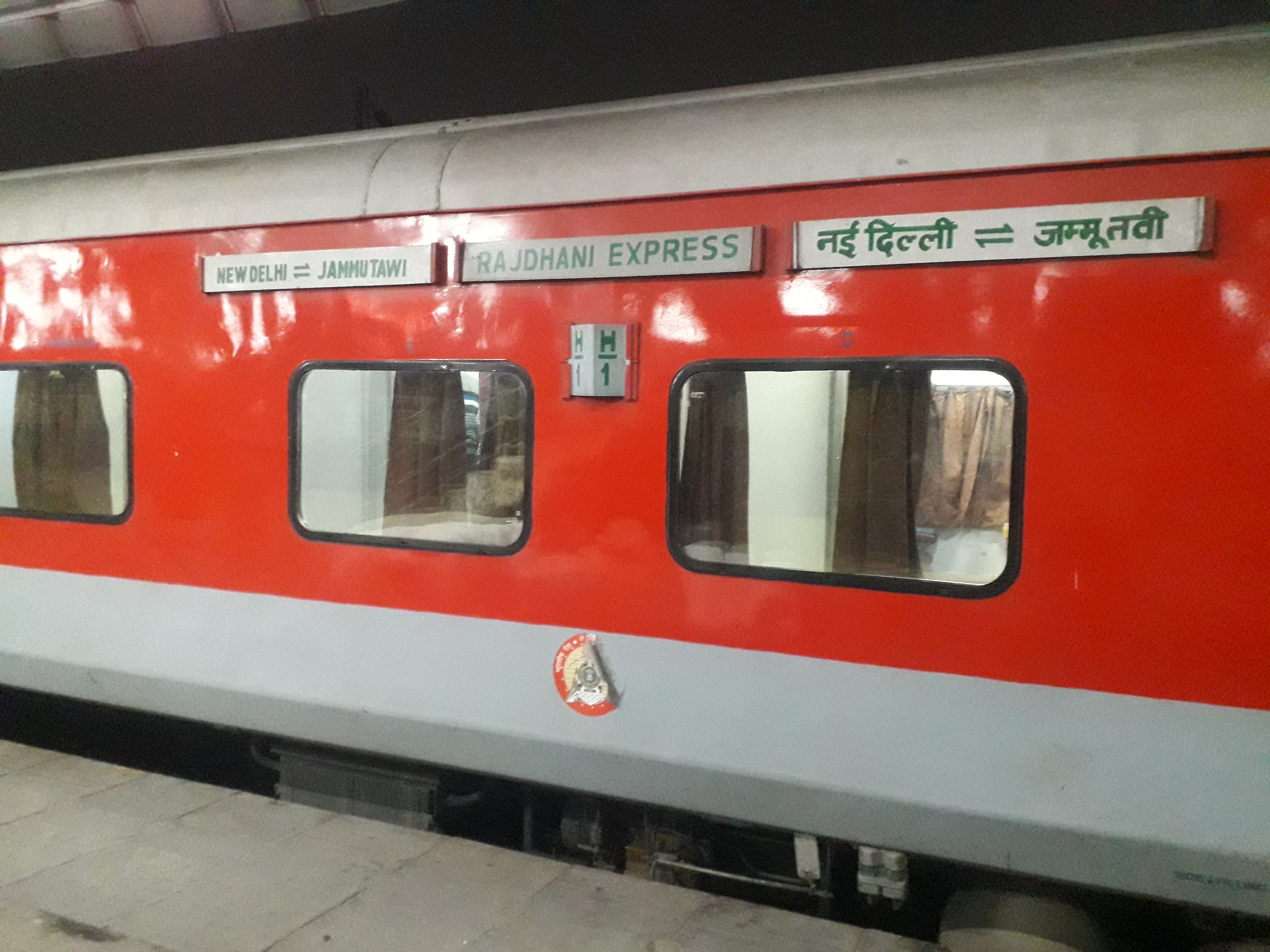
12425 Jammu Rajdhani Express – AC 1st Class coach

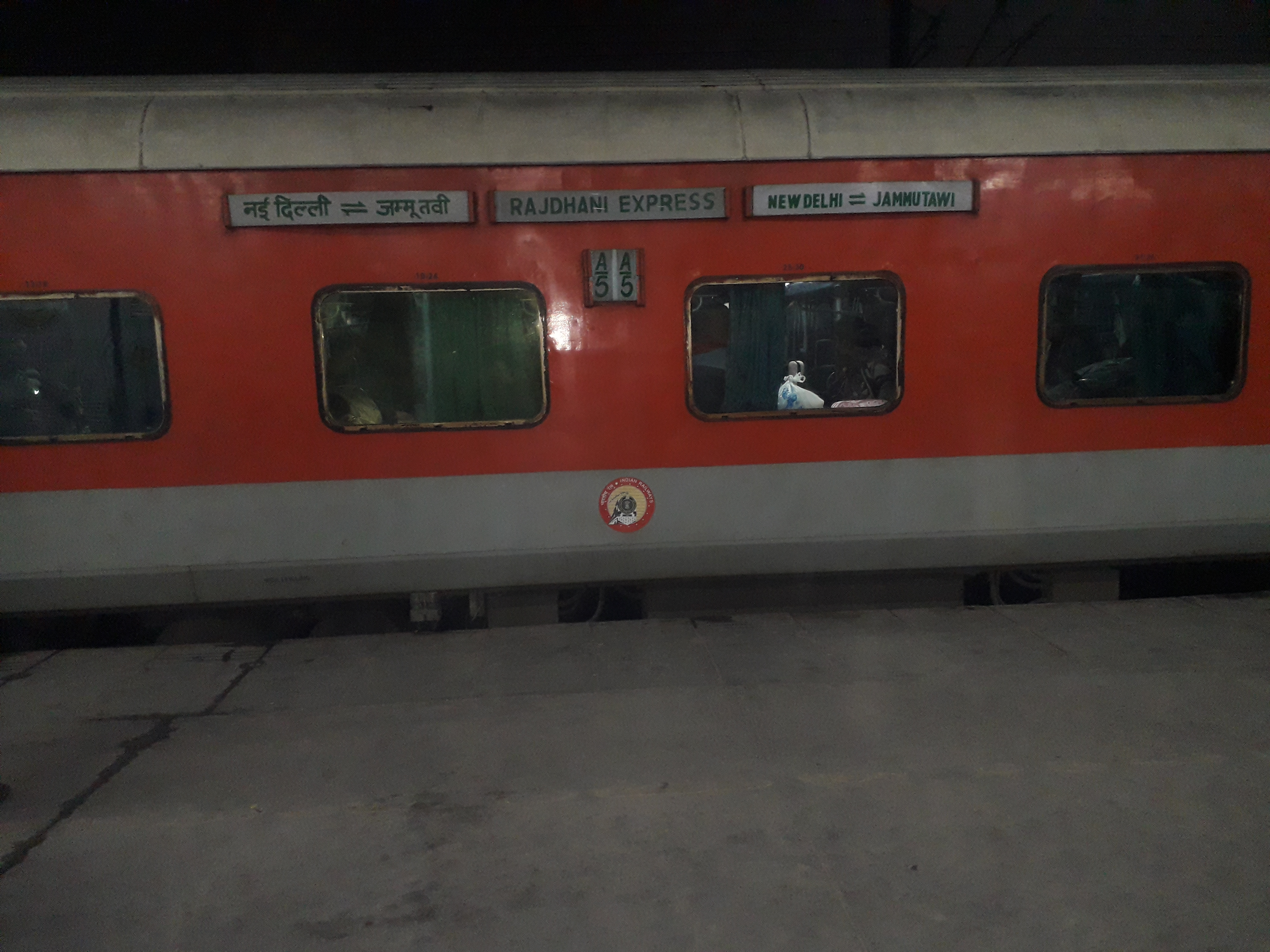
12425 Jammu Rajdhani Express – AC 2 tier coach

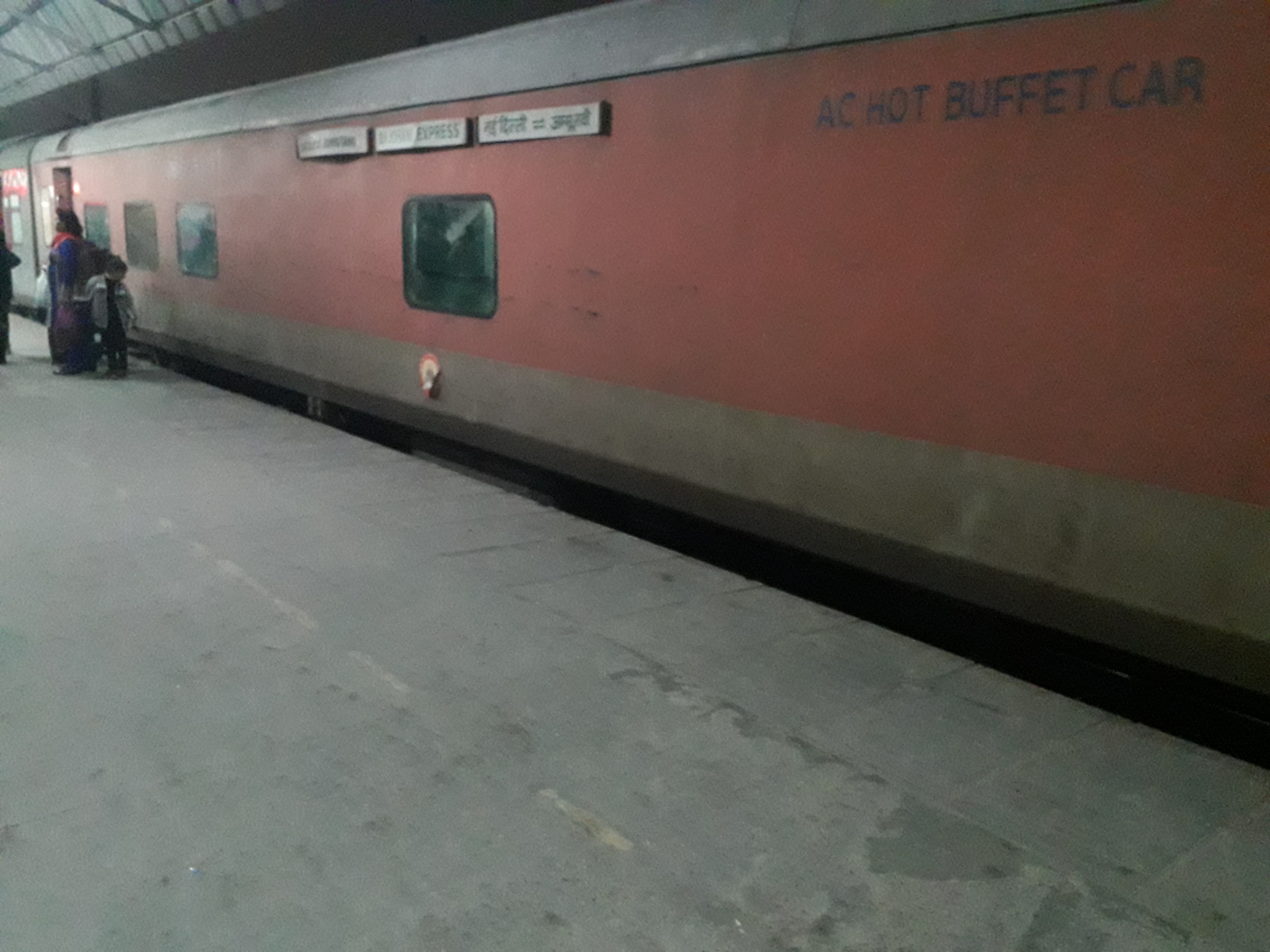
12425 Jammu Rajdhani Express – Pantry car coach

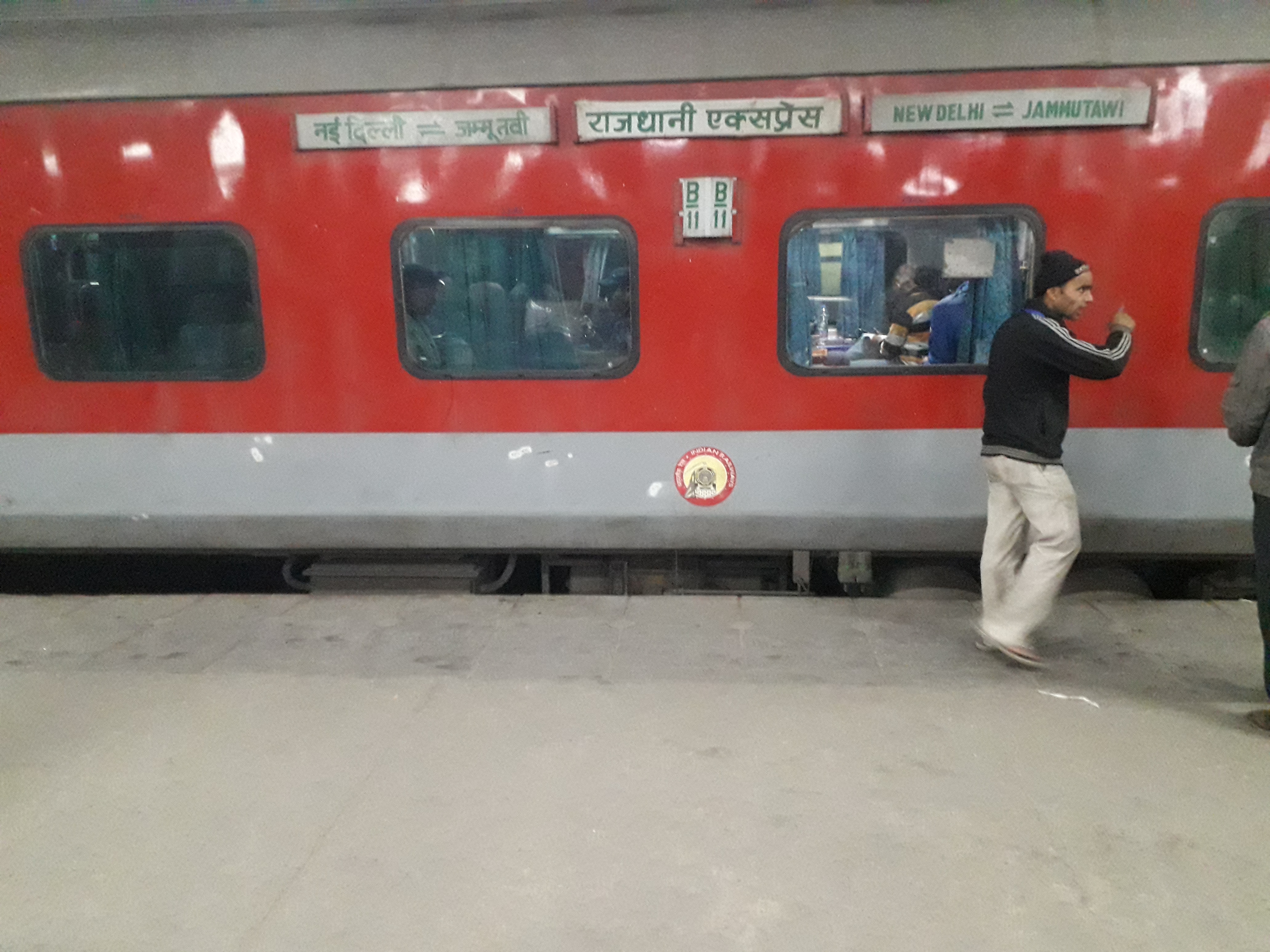
12425 Jammu Rajdhani Express – AC 3 tier coach

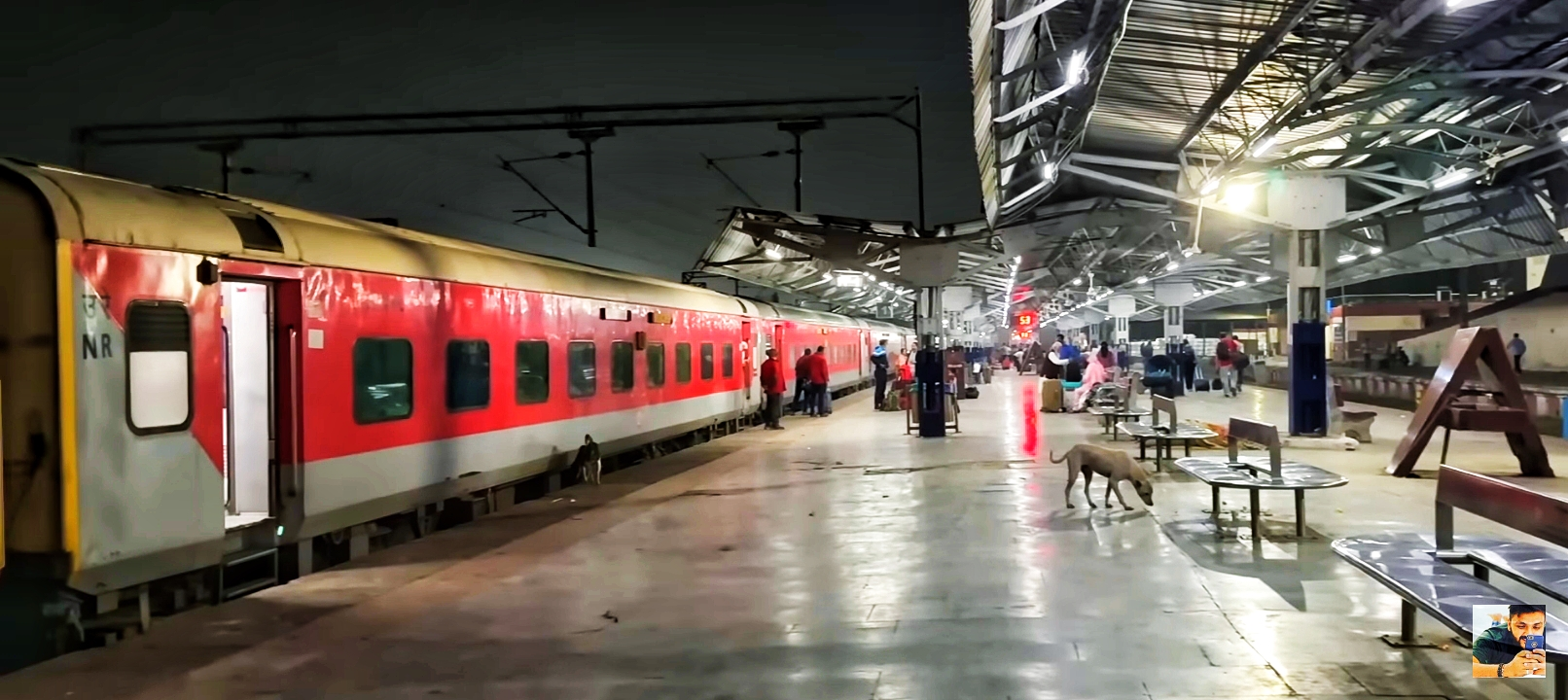
Jammu Rajdhani Express At Jammu Tawi

=== Coach composition ===
Loco	1	2	3	4	5	6	7	8	9	10	11	12	13	14	15	16	17	18	19	20	21
LOCO	EOG	B1	B2	B3	B4	B5	B6	B7	B8	B9	B10	B11	B12	PC	A1	A2	A3	A4	A5	H1	EOG

== See also ==
- Jammu Mail
- Uttar Sampark Kranti Express
- Jammu Tawi
- Jhelum Express
- Shalimar Express
- Jammu–Baramulla line
