= Bangalore Rajdhani Express =

Train in India

KSR Bengaluru - Hazrat Nizamuddin Rajdhani Express
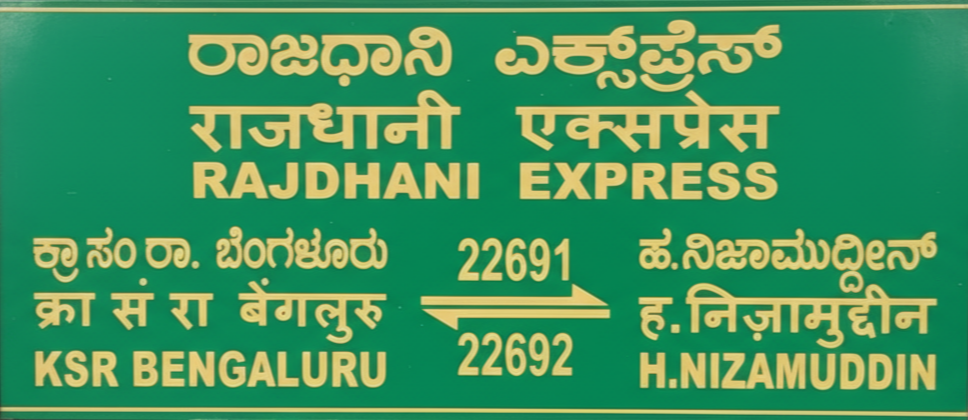

- KSR Bengaluru - Hazrat Nizamuddin Rajdhani Express At Itarsi Junction

Overview
- Service type: Rajdhani Express
- Locale: Karnataka, Andhra Pradesh, Telangana, Maharashtra, Madhya Pradesh, Rajasthan, Haryana, Uttar Pradesh & Delhi
- First service: 1 November 1992; 33 years ago
- Current operator: South Western Railway

Route
- Termini: KSR Bengaluru (SBC); Hazrat Nizamuddin (NZM)
- Stops: 15
- Distance travelled: 2,366.3 km (1,470 mi)
- Average journey time: 33 hours 30 minutes
- Service frequency: Daily
- Train number: 22691 / 22692
- Lines used: Bangalore–Guntakal section; Guntakal–Secunderabad section; Secunderabad–Nagpur line; Nagpur–Bhopal section; Bhopal–Agra section; Agra–New Delhi (till Hazrat Nizamuddin)

On-board services
- Classes: AC 1st Class, AC 2 Tier, AC 3 Tier
- Seating arrangements: No
- Sleeping arrangements: Yes
- Catering facilities: Available
- Observation facilities: Large windows
- Baggage facilities: Available
- Other facilities: Below the seats

Technical
- Rolling stock: LHB coach
- Track gauge: 1,676 mm (5 ft 6 in); Broad Gauge
- Electrification: Fully Electrified
- Operating speed: 130 km/h (81 mph) maximum speed, 71 km/h (44 mph) average including halts.

The 22691 / 22692 KSR Bengaluru City – Hazrat Nizamuddin Rajdhani Express, (often called as Namma Rajdhani Express) is a Rajdhani Express train Daily connecting Karnataka's Capital Bangalore and National Capital Delhi. According to a report, it is the highest revenue-earning express train of the Indian Railways as of 2023.

== History ==
Originally introduced in 1992 after completion of Gauge conversion of 311.3 kilometres (193.4 mi) long Guntakal-Dharmavaram-Puttaparthi-Hindupur-Bangalore Line, it was a weekly train numbered 29/30. It was then converted to bi-weekly, tri-weekly and then four times a week by 2005 as 2429/30. Timings of 2430 Bangalore Rajdhani was:- Nizamuddin 20.50 pm, Agra 23.07; Jhansi 01.44 am, Bhopal 05.21 am, Nagpur 10.56 am, Kazipet 16.58 pm, Secunderabad 19.25 pm, Guntakal 01.55 am & Bangalore 07.25 am. Return timings of 2429 Bangalore Rajdhani was:- Bangalore 18.45 pm, Guntakal 00.15 am, Secunderabad 07.10 am, Kazipet 09.02 am, Nagpur 15.12 pm, Bhopal 20.47 pm, Jhansi 00.25 am & Nizamuddin 05.20 am. The train used to cover 2,383.4 kilometres (1,481.0 mi) in 34 hours 35 mins having average speed of 69 km/h (43 mph). The weekly 2437/2438 Secunderabad Rajdhani Express used to follow this timings of Bangalore Rajdhani in Nizamuddin-Secunderabad stretch until 2010. Number of Bangalore Rajdhani was changed from 2429/2430 to 12429/12430 to 22691/22692 from 2010 to 2020 period. Another Bangalore Rajdhani numbered 22693/22694 via Secunderabad, Kurnool, Dhone, Dharmavaram & Puttaparthi following same timings of 22691/22692 was introduced to run in 2010-2017 period. It was withdrawn & 22691/22692 Bangalore Rajdhani was made into a daily service post 2017 period. Timings were sped up in 2015 with 50 mins speed up in Secunderabad-Bangalore stretch of the train journey with Nizamuddin 20.50 pm, Secunderabad 18.58 pm, Guntakal 01.32 am; Bangalore 06.35 am for Nizamuddin-Bangalore journey & Bangalore 20.00 pm, Guntakal 01.00 am, Secunderabad 07.45 am, Kazipet 09.37 am, Nagpur 15.47 pm, Bhopal 21.22 pm, Jhansi 01.00 am & Nizamuddin 05.45 am.

== Service ==
22691/22692 Bangalore Rajdhani Express is the 2nd fastest train on the Bengaluru (earlier known as Bangalore)–Delhi sector after Yeshvantapur–Delhi Sarai Rohilla AC Duronto Express. It is a daily service. It operates as train number 22691 from Krantivira Sangolli Rayanna (Bangalore) to Hazrat Nizamuddin railway station, and as train number 22692 in the reverse direction. It has been converted into a daily service from 1 July 2017.

== Routes and halts ==
1. KSR Bangalore City
2. Sathya Sai Prasanthi Nilayam
3. Guntakal Junction
4. Raichur
5. Sedam
6. Secunderabad
7. Kazipet
8. Balharshah
9. Nagpur Junction
10. Itarsi Junction
11. Bhopal Junction
12. Jhansi Junction
13. Gwalior
14. Agra Cantonment
15. Hazrat Nizamuddin

== Current timings ==
22692 departs Nizamuddin at 19.45 pm, Agra 22.02; Jhansi 00.40 am, Bhopal 04.19 am, Nagpur 09.54 am, Kazipet 15.56 pm, Secunderabad 18.12 pm, Guntakal 00.12 am, Puttaparthi 02.34 am & arrives Bangalore at 05.15 am. 22691 departs Bangalore at 20.00 pm, Puttaparthi 22.22 pm, Guntakal 00.50 am, Secunderabad 07.05 am, Kazipet 08.57 am, Nagpur 15.17 pm, Bhopal 20.52 pm, Jhansi 00.35 am & Nizamuddin arrival at 05.30 am. The train now covers 2,366.3 kilometres (1,470.4 mi) in 33 hours 30 mins running at 71 km/h (44 mph)

== Traction ==
While earlier, it was run using WDM-2, WDM-3A, from Krishnarajapuram and Kazipet sheds, and then WDP-4 from Krishnarajapuram shed, it is hauled end-to-end by a Lallaguda WAP-7 and so is with WAP-5

== Gallery ==
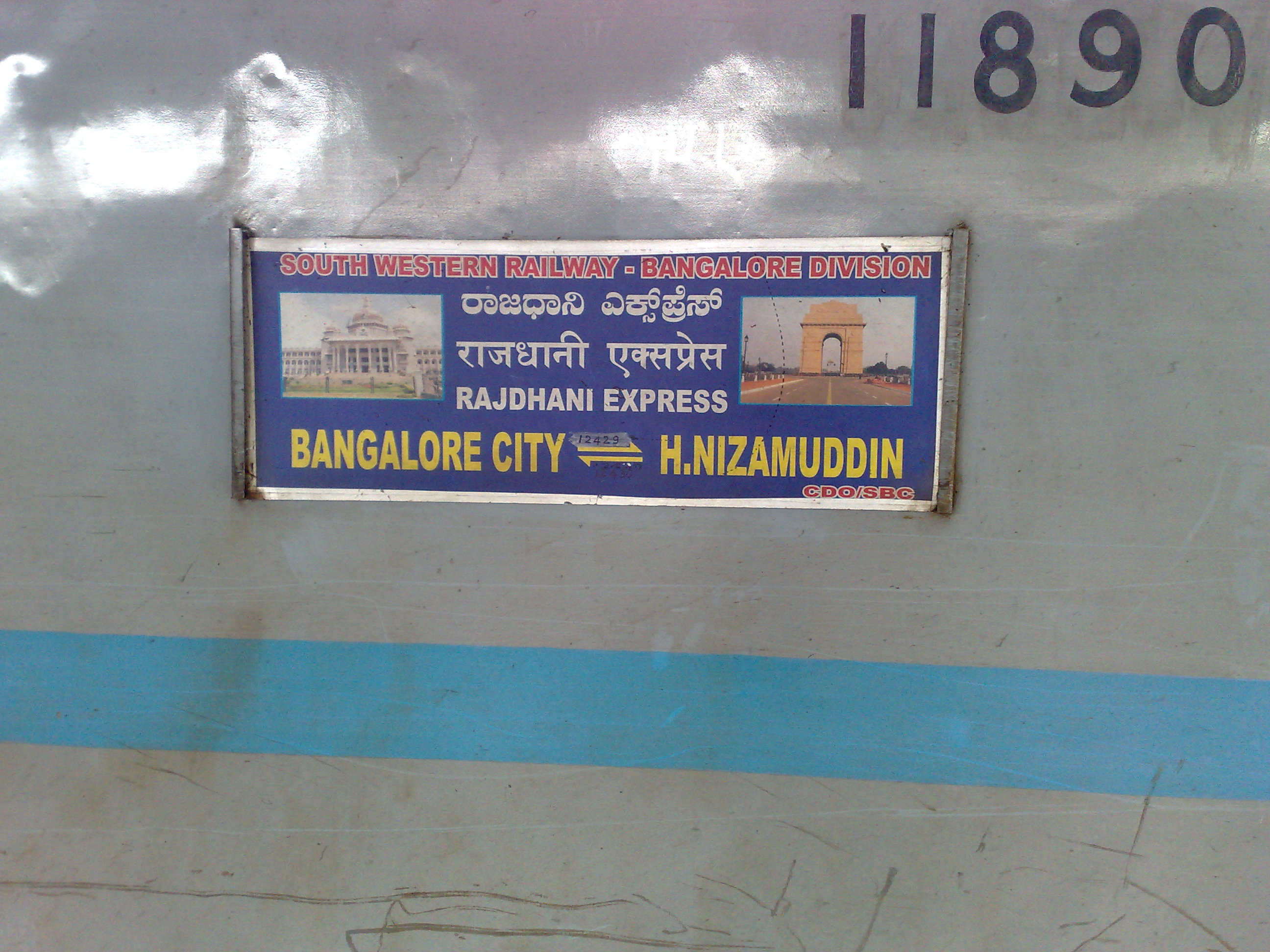

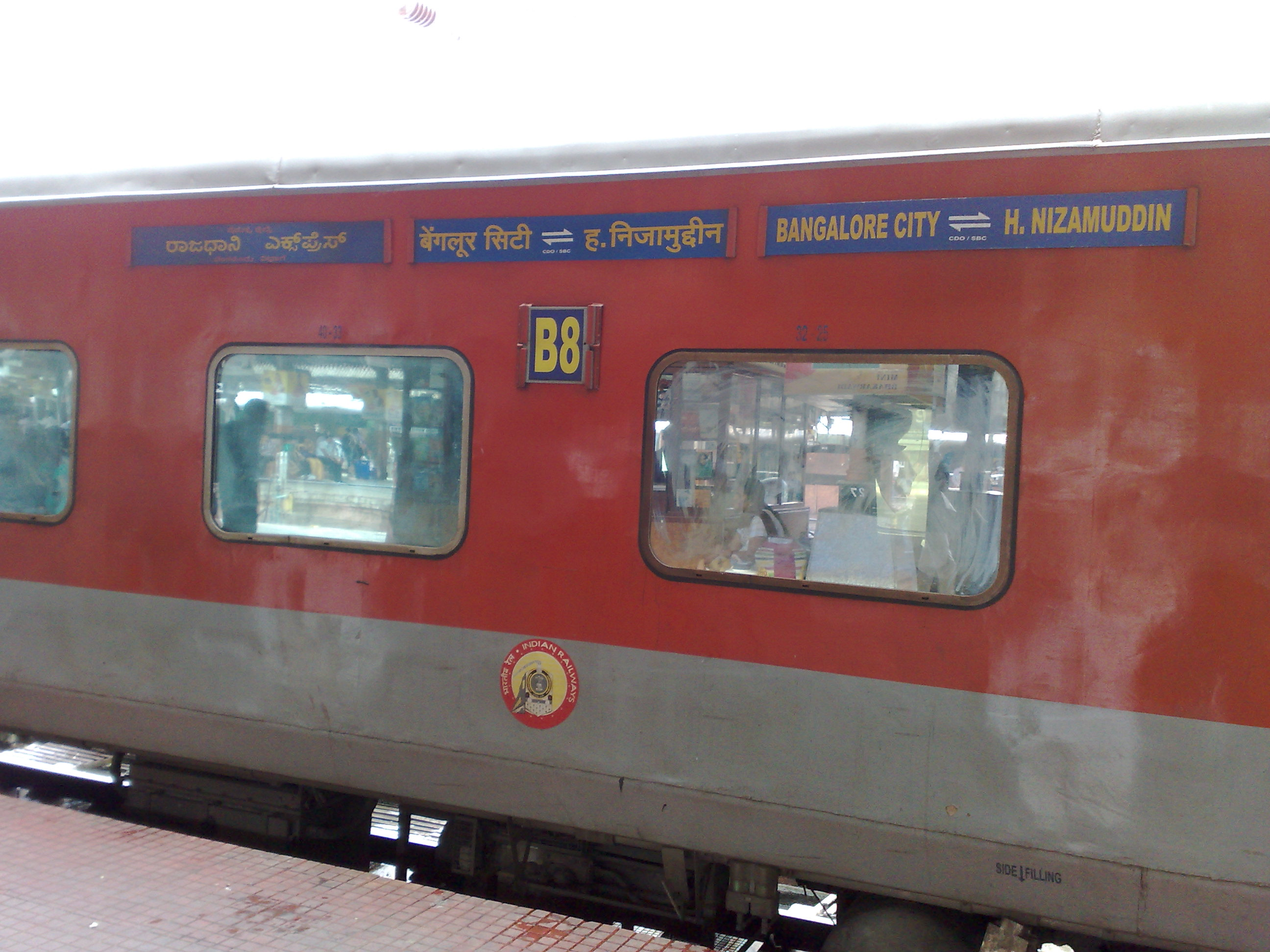
Banglore Rajdhani Express AC 3 tier coach

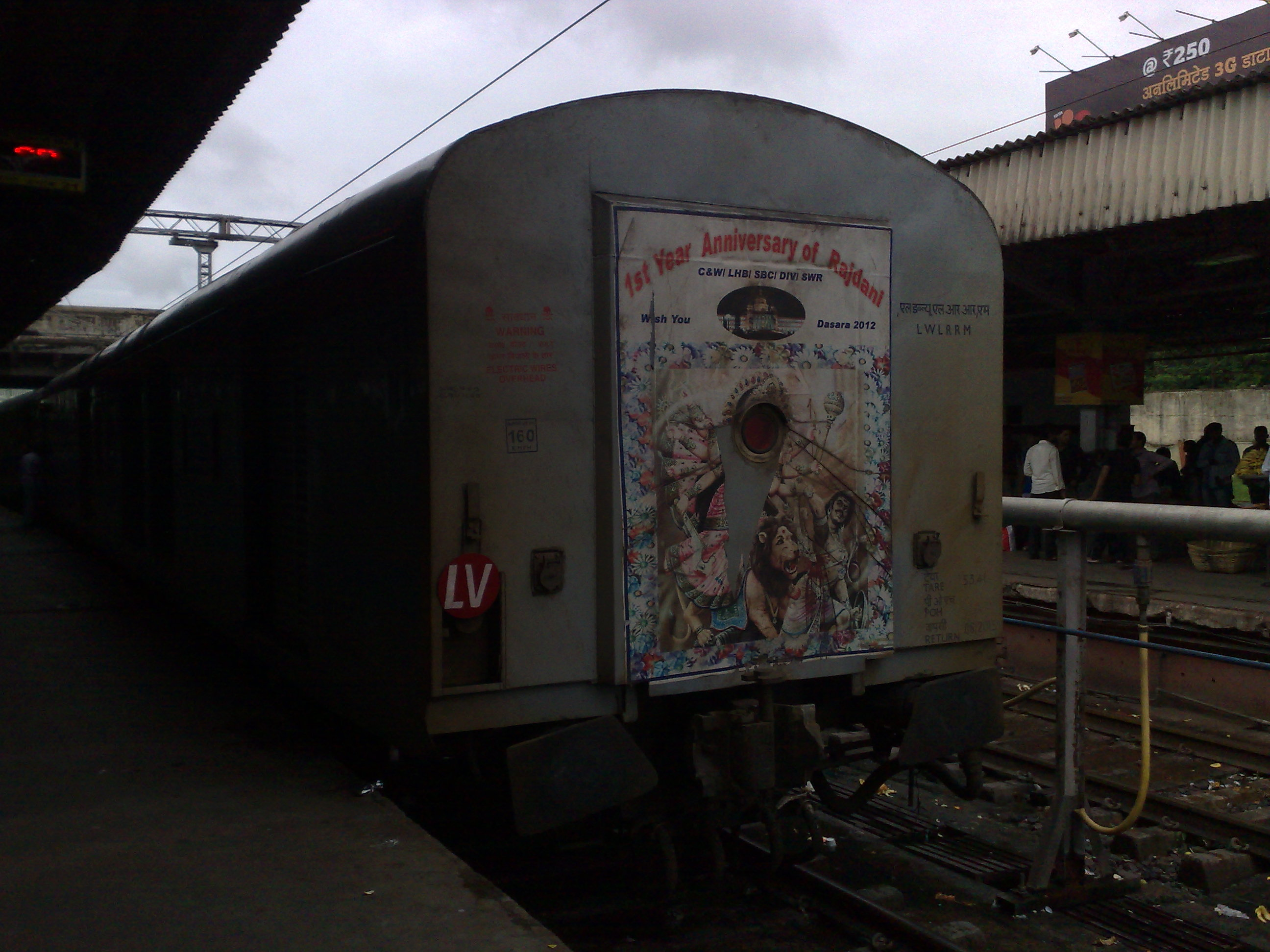
Greeting poster on Banglore Rajdhani

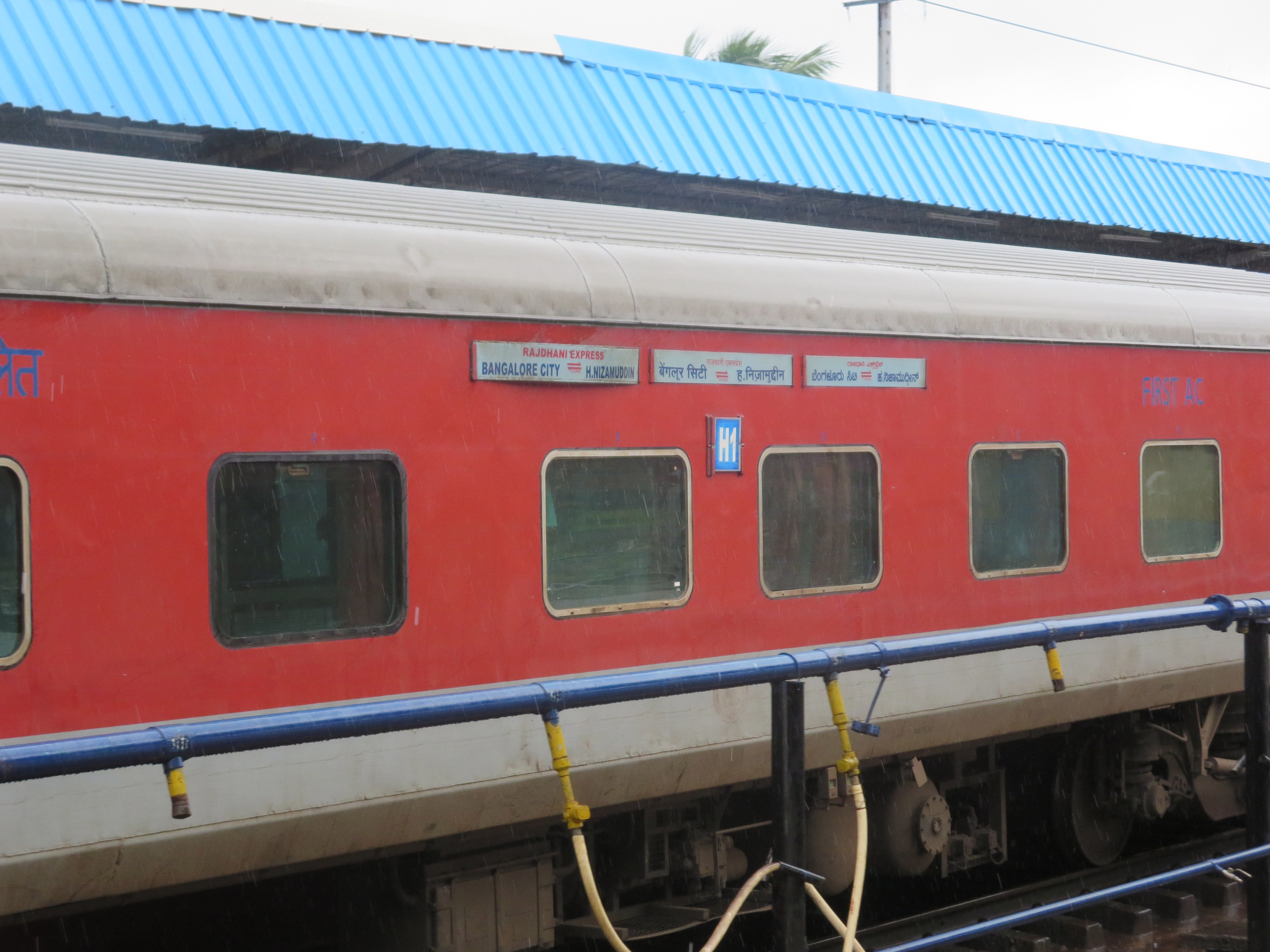
AC 1st Class Bangalore Rajdhani Express
