= Chennai Rajdhani Express =

Train in India

MGR Chennai Central–Hazrat Nizamuddin Rajdhani Express

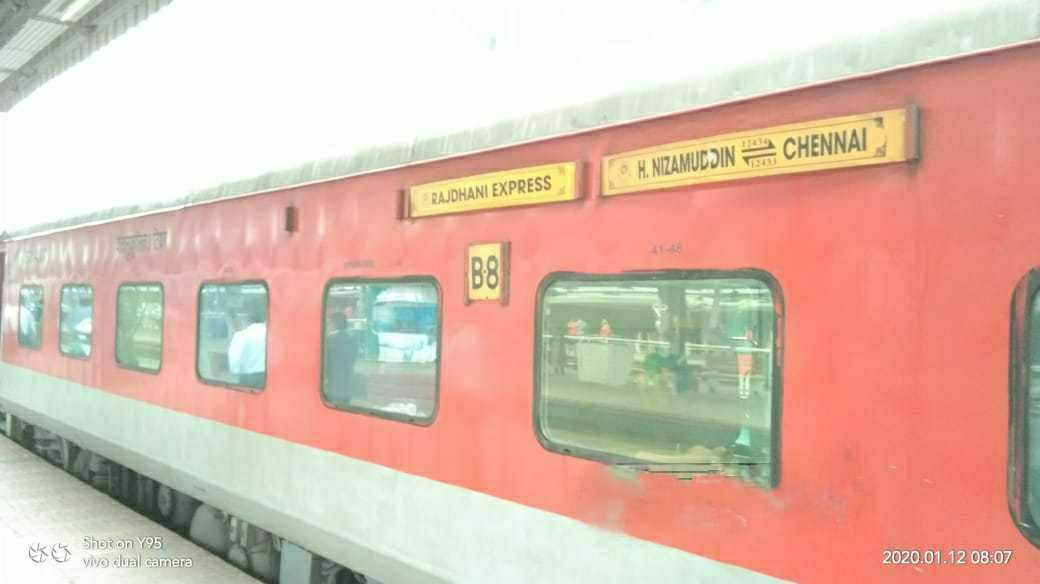
- Rajdhani Express At Mathura Junction

Overview
- Service type: Rajdhani Express
- Locale: Tamil Nadu, Andhra Pradesh, Telangana, Maharashtra, Madhya Pradesh, Uttar Pradesh, Rajasthan, Haryana & Delhi
- First service: 1993; 33 years ago
- Current operator: Northern Railways

Route
- Termini: MGR Chennai Central (MAS); Hazrat Nizamuddin (NZM)
- Stops: 8
- Distance travelled: 2,182 km (1,356 mi)
- Average journey time: 28 hours 15 minutes
- Service frequency: Bi-weekly
- Train number: 12433 / 12434

On-board services
- Classes: AC First Class, AC Two Tier, AC Three Tier
- Seating arrangements: Yes
- Sleeping arrangements: Yes
- Catering facilities: Available
- Observation facilities: Large windows
- Entertainment facilities: Yes

Technical
- Rolling stock: LHB coach
- Track gauge: 1,676 mm (5 ft 6 in)
- Operating speed: 130 km/h (81 mph) Permissible. 77 km/h (48 mph) average with halts
- Rake sharing: Thiruvananthapuram Rajdhani Express; Secunderabad Rajdhani Express; Madgaon Rajdhani Express
Route map
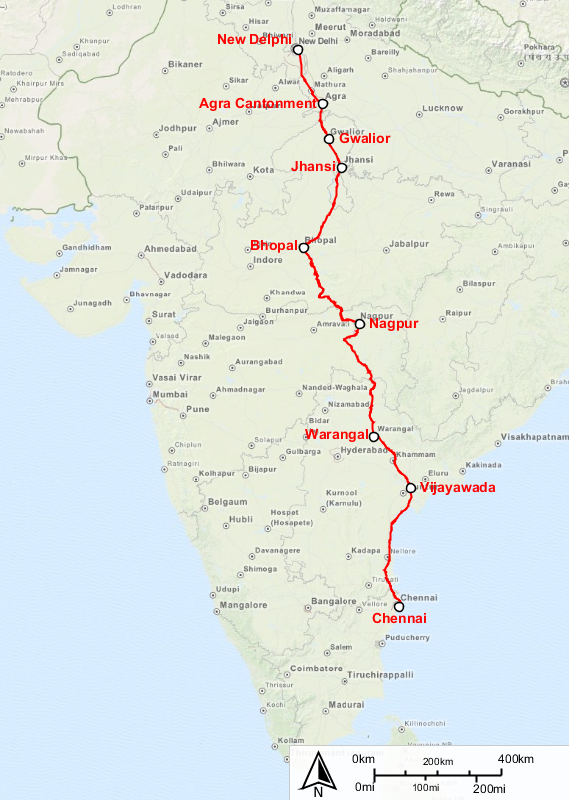
↓ 12434 • 12433 ↑

The 12433 / 12434 MGR Chennai Central–Hazrat Nizamuddin Rajdhani Express is an important train connecting Chennai & New Delhi. According to 1993-94 railway budget, this train service was introduced as 2633/2634 (number of that time) Hazrat Nizamuddin-Chennai Rajdhani Express in 1996-97 and maybe it was introduced then (1996–97). 2619/2620 Thiruvananthapuram Rajdhani Express used to run via Madras (Chennai) Central and presently avoids goes via Konkan Railway and it is older than the current Chennai Rajdhani Express and this Thiruvananthapuram Rajdhani Express was first introduced in 1993 and runs twice a week from Delhi and twice from Thiruvananthapuram Rajdhani via Chennai. Chennai Rajdhani Timings in 1995 were Hazrat Nizamuddin 09.30 am, Agra 11.47 am, Jhansi 14.25 am, Bhopal 18.05 pm, Nagpur 23.40 pm, Vijayawada 09.30 am, Chennai 15.30 pm. In return timings were Chennai 06.30 am,Vijayawada 12.40 pm, Nagpur 22.35 pm, Bhopal 04.10 pm, Jhansi 07.35 pm, Hazrat Nizamuddin 12.30 pm. It was a 30 hours journey to cover the distance of 2,182 km (1,356 mi) running at 73 km/h (45 mph) average speed with halts. Currently the Chennai Rajdhani is a fast alternative to the classic Grand Trunk Express and the modern Superfast Tamil Nadu Express. The Chennai Rajdhani Express covers a huge long distance of 2,182 km (1,356 mi) in 28 hours 15 minutes as compared to 32 Hours 30 mins taken by Tamil Nadu Express and 34 hours and 30 minutes taken by Grand Trunk Express. It shares the record of being the second fastest train between Chennai Central and Hazrat Nizamuddin covering the distance of 2,182 km (1,356 mi) in 28 hours and 15 minutes as Chennai Duronto covering the 2,182 km (1,356 mi) distance journey in 27 hours and 55 minutes but in return it does not happen. It is the second fastest train from Chennai to Delhi after Duronto Express . It covers it's 2,182 km (1,356 mi) in just 28 Hours running at 77 km/h (48 mph) speed

== Train ==
The train get highest priority on the Indian railway network and is fully air-conditioned. Passengers are provided with complimentary meals during the journey. Depending on the timings of the train, lunch, high tea, dinner, morning tea, and breakfast are served. The trains offer three classes of accommodation; First Class AC with 2 or 4 berth lockable bedrooms, AC 2-tier with open system berths (bays of 4 berths + 2 berths on the side) but provided with curtains for privacy, AC 3-tier (bays of 6 berths + 2 berths on the side) without curtains.

Passengers travelling on the First AC class in this train are treated with luxury. They get their own private cabin, music stereos, scent emitters and a four-course dinner.

The Chennai Rajdhani Express runs at an average speed of 77 km/h (48 mph). This train now runs with the new LHB rakes, which were introduced in 2012.

== Traction ==
It is hauled by a Lallaguda or Royapuram based WAP-7 locomotive from end to end.

== Route and halts ==
- Chennai Central
- Vijayawada
- Warangal
- Balharshah
- Nagpur
- Bhopal Junction
- Jhansi Junction
- Gwalior Junction
- Agra Cantonment
- Hazrat Nizamuddin

== Coach composition ==
This train has 11 AC Three tier,5 AC Two Tier,1 AC First Class,1 pantry car & 2 luggage cum generator coaches taking the total to 20 LHB coach. It shares its rake with Thiruvananthapuram Rajdhani Express and Secunderabad Rajdhani Express and Madgaon Rajdhani Express

Loco	1	2	3	4	5	6	7	8	9	10	11	12	13	14	15	16	17	18	19	20
	EOG	H1	A5	A4	A3	A2	A1	PC	B11	B10	B9	B8	B7	B6	B5	B4	B3	B2	B1	EOG

== Timetable ==
The 12433 Rajdhani Express leaves Chennai Central in the morning of Friday and Sunday at 06:10 am, Vijayawada at 11.40 am, Warangal at 14.28 pm, Balharshah at 17.30 pm, Nagpur at 20.20 pm, Bhopal at 01.55 am, Jhansi at 05.25 am, Gwalior at 06.31 am, Agra at 07.58 am and reaches Hazrat Nizamuddin at 10:30 in the morning of the next day. On the return journey, the 12434 Chennai Rajdhani leaves Hazrat Nizamuddin at 15:35 pm on Wednesday and Friday, Agra at 17.47 pm, Gwalior at 19.14 pm, Jhansi at 20.30 pm, Bhopal at 00.01 am, Nagpur at 05.23 am, Balharshah at 08.18 am, Warangal at 11.45 am, Vijayawada at 14.45 pm and reaches Chennai Central at 20:45 in the evening of the next day. covering 2,182 km (1,356 mi) distance in 28 hours 15 mins running at 77 km/h (48 mph) average with halts

== Speed ==
The maximum permissible speed is up to 130 km/h but it is lower in some parts. Its all coaches are of air conditioned LHB coach type which is capable of reaching 160 km/h but it does not touch. Sometimes people become confused because according to Indian Railways Permanent Way Manual (IRPWM) on its website or Indian Railway Institute of Civil Engineering website, the BG (Broad Gauge) lines have been classified into six groups 'A' to 'E' on the basis of the future maximum permissible speeds but it may not be same as present speed.

The maximum permissible speed of the train or the route is 120 km/h between H. Nizamuddin and Tuglakabad where RDSO has been requested to corroborate the track quality fit for raising sectional speed to 130 km/h. The maximum permissible speed of the train is 130 km/h in Tuglakabad (TKD) – Palwal (PWL) – Mathura (MTJ) route where it is slower than the fastest train of the route having speed of 160 km/h. After leaving the common route towards Mumbai, maximum permissible speed of the train is 130 km/h in Mathura (MTJ) – Agra Cantt (AGC) route where it is slower than the fastest train of the route having speed of 160 km/h. The maximum permissible speed of the train or the route is 130 km/h in Agra Cantt (AGC) – DHO – Jhansi – Lalitpur (LAR) route but increasing of speed of H. Nizamuddin – Jhansi Gatimaan Express and Rani Kamalapati (Habibganj)–Hazrat Nizamuddin Vande Bharat Expressup to 160 km/h is planned between Agra Cantt and Jhansi and the proposed speed is higher than this Chennai Rajdhani Express train. The maximum permissible speed of the train or the route is 120 km/h in Lalitpur (LAR) – Bina – Itarsi [near and before Jujharpur (JHP)] route where proposal for raising of speed up to 130 km/h is under preparation. The maximum permissible speed of the train or the route is 130 km/h over Itarsi - Jujharpur (JHP) - Nagpur - Wardha - Ballarshah (BPQ) except Dharakhoh – Maramijhiri, Chichonda – Teegaon hilly areas where it is 65 km/h. The maximum permissible speed of the train or the route will be increased to 130 km/h very soon or it might have been already increased in Ballarshah (BPQ) – Kazipet (KZJ) – Gudur (GDR) route. The maximum permissible speed of the train and the route is increased to 130 km/h from 110 in Gudur (GDR) – Basin bridge – MGR Chennai Central (MAS) (fast lines between Basin Bridge and Chennai Central are taken) route recently (Press Release on Southern Railway website on 07, Oct 2022).

== Gallery ==
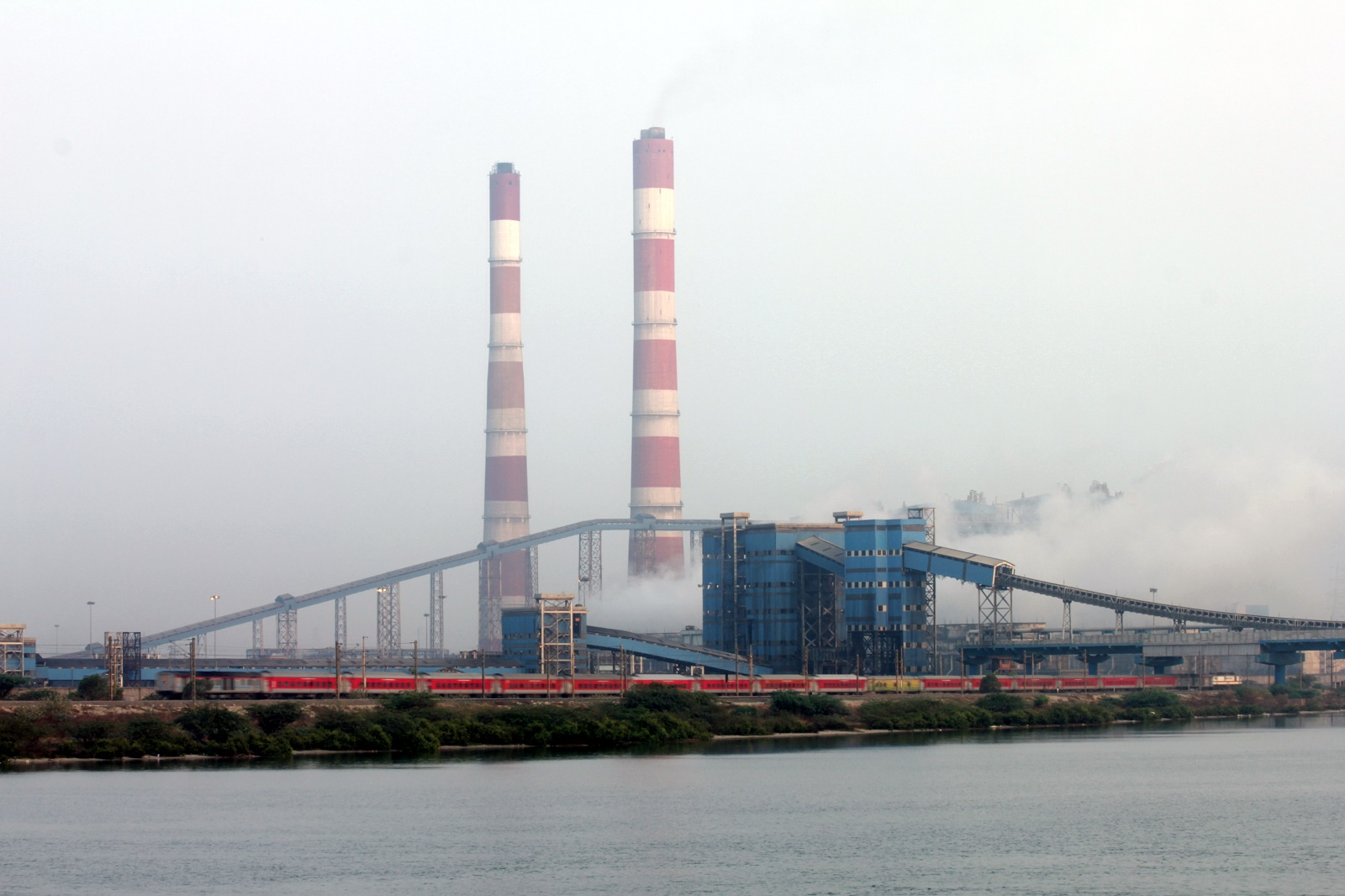
Chennai Rajdhani Express crossing Vallur Thermal Power Station

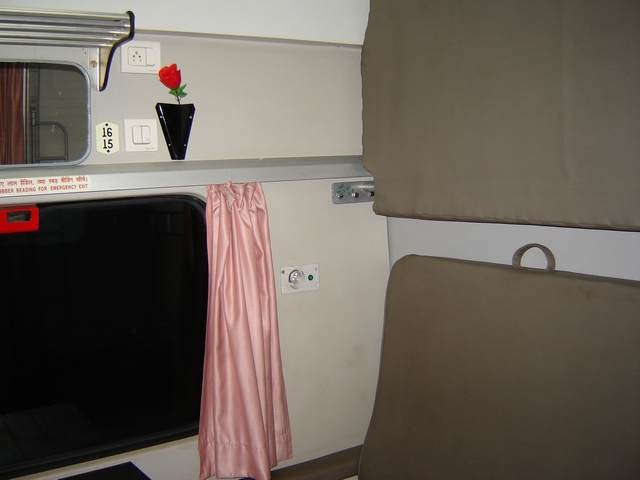
Interior of a First Class AC bedroom
