= Secunderabad – Hazrat Nizamuddin Rajdhani Express =

Train in India

Secunderabad Rajdhani Express

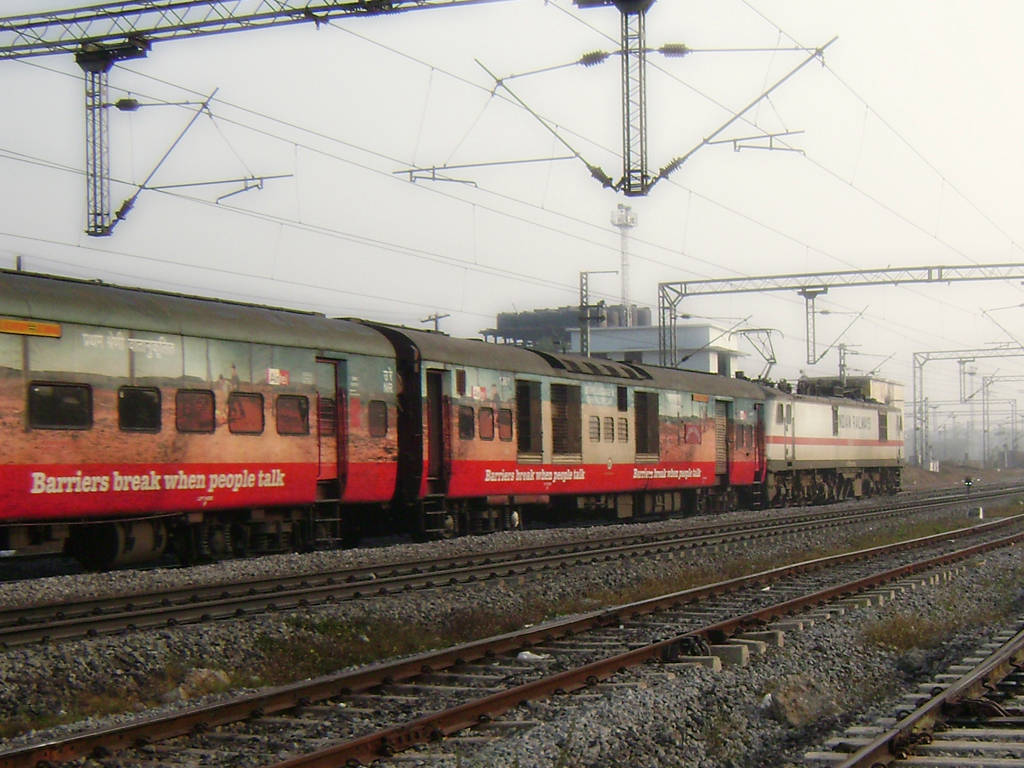
- Secunderabad Rajdhani Express At Itarsi ByPass

Overview
- Service type: Rajdhani Express
- Locale: Telangana, Maharashtra, Madhya Pradesh, Uttar Pradesh, Haryana & Delhi
- First service: 12 February 2002; 24 years ago
- Current operator: Northern Railways

Route
- Termini: Secunderabad (SC); Hazrat Nizamuddin (NZM)
- Stops: 5
- Distance travelled: 1,663.2 km (1,033.5 mi)
- Average journey time: 21 hours 45 minutes
- Service frequency: Weekly
- Train number: 12437 / 12438

On-board services
- Classes: AC 1st Class, AC 2 Tier, AC 3 Tier
- Seating arrangements: No
- Sleeping arrangements: Yes
- Auto-rack arrangements: Available
- Catering facilities: Available (included in the ticket)
- Observation facilities: Large windows
- Baggage facilities: Yes

Technical
- Rolling stock: LHB coach
- Track gauge: 1,676 mm (5 ft 6 in)
- Operating speed: 130 km/h (81 mph) Max Permissible Speed (MPS). 76.50 km/h (48 mph) average including halts
- Rake sharing: Thiruvananthapuram Rajdhani Express; Chennai Rajdhani Express; Madgaon Rajdhani Express

The 12437 / 12438 Secunderabad Rajdhani Express is a Superfast Express train from Indian Railways connecting Hyderabad, the state capital of Telangana and the national capital Delhi. The train runs from Secunderabad Junction to Hazrat Nizamuddin.

== Traction ==
It is hauled by Lallaguda-based WAP-7 locomotive from end to end.

== Schedule and rakes ==
The train numbers are 12437/12438. The train departs every Wednesday at 12:50 hrs from Secunderabad and arrives Hazrat Nizamuddin on Thursday at 10:30 hrs. While from Hazrat Nizamuddin it departs every Sunday at 15:35 hrs and arrives Secunderabad on Monday at 13:25 hrs. It comprises one AC 1st class, 5 AC 2 Tier, 9 AC 3 Tier and 1 pantry car. This train runs with LHB rakes. It shares its rake with Chennai Rajdhani Express and Thiruvananthapuram Rajdhani Express and Madgaon Rajdhani Express

== Rake sharing ==
This train shares its rake with

M.G.R Chennai Central to Hazrat Nizamuddin Rajdhni express

Thiruvananthapuram Central to Hazrat Nizamuddin Rajdhani express

Hazrat Nizamuddin to M.G.R Chennai Central Rajdhani express

Hazrat Nizamuddin to Thiruvananthapuram Central Rajdhani express

== 12437/12438 Time Table before 2010 ==
Down Direction:-

Station code	Station name	Arrival	Departure
NZM	Hazrat Nizamuddin		20:50
JHS	Jhansi Junction	01.44	01.54
BPL	Bhopal Junction	05.11	05.21
NGP	Nagpur Junction	10.46	10.56
BPQ	Balharshah Junction	13:57	14:02
KZJ	Kazipet Junction	16.56	16:58
SC	Secunderabad Junction	19:10	

Up direction:-

Station code	Station name	Arrival	Departure
SC	Secunderabad Junction		07:10
KZJ	Kazipet Junction	09:00	09:02
BPQ	Balharshah Junction	11:56	12:01
NGP	Nagpur Junction	15:02	15:12
BPL	Bhopal Junction	20:37	20:47
JHS	Jhansi Junction	00:15	00:25
NZM	Hazrat Nizamuddin	05:20	

== 12437/12438 Timetable after 2010 ==
Down direction:-

Station code	Station name	Arrival	Departure
NZM	Hazrat Nizamuddin		15:35
JHS	Jhansi Junction	20:15	20:25
BPL	Bhopal Junction	23:46	23:56
NGP	Nagpur Junction	05:21	05:31
BPQ	Balharshah Junction	08:19	08:24
KZJ	Kazipet Junction	11:11	11:13
SC	Secunderabad Junction	13:25	

Up Direction:-

Station code	Station name	Arrival	Departure
SC	Secunderabad Junction		12:50
KZJ	Kazipet Junction	14:29	14:31
BPQ	Balharshah Junction	17:25	17:30
NGP	Nagpur Junction	20:25	20:35
BPL	Bhopal Junction	02:00	02:10
JHS	Jhansi Junction	05:30	05:40
NZM	Hazrat Nizamuddin	10:30	

== Coaches ==
Loco	1	2	3	4	5	6	7	8	9	10	11	12	13	14	15	16	17	18	19	20
	EOG	B1	B2	B3	B4	B5	B6	B7	B8	B9	B10	B11	PC	A1	A2	A3	A4	A5	H1	EOG
