= Alencar =

Alencar is a given name and surname. It can refer to:

== People ==
- Alencar Santana (born 1976), Brazilian politician
- Francisco Paulo de Alencar Filho (born 1975), Brazilian former goalkeeper
- Humberto de Alencar Castelo Branco (1900–1967), Brazilian statesman
- José Alencar (born 1931–2011), Brazilian politician
- José de Alencar (1829–1877), Brazilian novelist
- Otto Alencar (born 1947), Brazilian politician
- Tiago Alencar dos Santos, (born 1986) Brazilian footballer
- Alencar (footballer, born 2002) (Rodrigo Souza Santos) Brazilian footballer
- Manoel Alencar do Monte (born 1892), Brazilian footballer

== Places ==
- Alencar (crater), crater on Mercury
- Alencar Peak, peak in Antarctica
