= July 30 =

July 30 this year in various calendars
- Thursday, 30 July 2026
Akan	Nkyiyaw
Armenian	10 Nawasardi 1476
Aztec	Pānquetzaliztli 1, 7 Ātl
Babylonian	15 Du'uzu, 2337 SE
Balinese pawukon	Luang, Pepet, Kajeng, Jaya, Pon, Urukung, Wraspati of Krulut, Guru, Erangan, Manuh
Bengali	15 Shrabon, BS 1433
Chinese	Yin Wood Snake・Dipper Mansion; Fire Horse Year, Month 6, Day 17 (Dashu, 8 days until Liqiu)
Common Era	30 July 2026 CE
Coptic	23 Epip, AM 1742
Egyptian	15 Choiak, 2775 NE
Ethiopian	23 Ḥamlē, 2018 Amätä Məhrät
French Republican	Décade II, Duodi de Thermidor de l'Année 234 de la République
Gregorian	30 July, AD 2026
Hebrew	16 Av, AM 5786
Hindu	Śravaṇa・Prīti; Solar: 14 Śrāvaṇa, 1948 SE; Lunisolar: Pratipada, Kṛishna pakṣa of Āṣāḍha, 2083 VE; Rāudra・5127 KY・1,872,786
Icelandic	Fimmtudagur, 5 Heyannir 2026
Islamic	14 Safar, AH 1448 (using tabular method)
ISO week date	2026-W31-4
Japanese	17 Minazuki, Reiwa 8 (Taisho, 8 days until Risshū)
Julian	17 July, AD 2026 (AM 7534)
Julian day	2461252
Korean	17 Yangdal, 4359 DE
Maya	13.0.13.14.9; 2 Yaxkin, 7 Muluc
Roman	ante diem XVI Kalendas Augustas, MMDCCLXXIX AUC
Solar Hijri	8 Mordad, SH 1405
Tibetan	16 chu stod, me pho rta 2153 or 1772 or 1000

<<	July					>>
Su	Mo	Tu	We	Th	Fr	Sa
			1	2	3	4
5	6	7	8	9	10	11
12	13	14	15	16	17	18
19	20	21	22	23	24	25
26	27	28	29	30	31
2026

July 30 in recent years
2026 (Thursday)
2025 (Wednesday)
2024 (Tuesday)
2023 (Sunday)
2022 (Saturday)
2021 (Friday)
2020 (Thursday)
2019 (Tuesday)
2018 (Monday)
2017 (Sunday)

July 30 is the 211th day of the year (212th in leap years) in the Gregorian calendar; 154 days remain until the end of the year.

== Events ==
=== Pre-1600 ===
- 30 BC – Mark Antony wins a final cavalry battle against Octavian in the battle of Alexandria, but his infantry is defeated and the next day his fleet and troops start to desert to Octavian.
- 657 – Election of pope Vitalian following the death of pope Eugene I in the previous month.
- 762 – Baghdad is founded.
- 1183 – The Mor Bar Sauma Monastery is destroyed by a fire.
- 1419 – First Defenestration of Prague: A crowd of radical Hussites kill seven members of the Prague city council.
- 1502 – Christopher Columbus lands at Guanaja in the Bay Islands off the coast of Honduras during his fourth voyage.

=== 1601–1900 ===
- 1609 – Beaver Wars: At Ticonderoga (now Crown Point, New York), Samuel de Champlain shoots and kills two Iroquois chiefs on behalf of his native allies.
- 1619 – In Jamestown, Virginia, the first Colonial European representative assembly in the Americas, the Virginia General Assembly, convenes for the first time.
- 1627 – An earthquake kills about 5,000 people in Gargano, Italy.
- 1635 – Eighty Years' War: The Siege of Schenkenschans begins; Frederick Henry, Prince of Orange, begins the recapture of the strategically important fortress from the Spanish Army.
- 1645 – English Civil War: Scottish Covenanter forces under the Earl of Leven launch the Siege of Hereford, a remaining Royalist stronghold.
- 1656 – The Battle of Warsaw ends with a Swedish-Brandenburger victory over a larger Polish-Lithuanian force.
- 1676 – Nathaniel Bacon issues the "Declaration of the People of Virginia", beginning Bacon's Rebellion against the rule of Governor William Berkeley.
- 1729 – Founding of Baltimore, Maryland.
- 1733 – The first Masonic Grand Lodge in the future United States is constituted in Massachusetts.
- 1756 – In Saint Petersburg, Bartolomeo Rastrelli presents the newly built Catherine Palace to Empress Elizabeth and her courtiers.
- 1811 – Father Miguel Hidalgo y Costilla, leader of the Mexican insurgency, is executed by the Spanish in Chihuahua City, Mexico.
- 1859 – First ascent of Grand Combin, one of the highest summits in the Alps.
- 1863 – American Indian Wars: Representatives of the United States and tribal leaders including Chief Pocatello (of the Shoshone) sign the Treaty of Box Elder.
- 1863 – The Valuev Circular bans the publication of religious, educational and training books in Ukrainian in the Russian Empire.
- 1864 – American Civil War: Battle of the Crater: Union forces attempt to break Confederate lines at Petersburg, Virginia by exploding a large bomb under their trenches.
- 1865 – The steamboat Brother Jonathan sinks off the coast of Crescent City, California, killing 225 passengers, the deadliest shipwreck on the Pacific Coast of the U.S. at the time.
- 1866 – Armed Confederate veterans in New Orleans riot against a meeting of Radical Republicans, killing 48 people and injuring another 100.
- 1871 – The Staten Island Ferry Westfield's boiler explodes, killing over 85 people.

=== 1901–present ===
- 1912 – Japan's Emperor Meiji dies and is succeeded by his son Yoshihito, who is now known as the Emperor Taishō.
- 1916 – The Black Tom explosion in New York Harbor kills several people and destroys some $20,000,000 worth of military goods.
- 1930 – In Montevideo, Uruguay wins the first FIFA World Cup by beating Argentina.
- 1932 – Premiere of Walt Disney's Flowers and Trees, the first cartoon short to use Technicolor and the first Academy Award winning cartoon short.
- 1945 – World War II: Japanese submarine I-58 sinks the USS Indianapolis, killing 883 seamen. Most die during the following four days, until an aircraft notices the survivors.
- 1956 – A joint resolution of the U.S. Congress is signed by President Dwight D. Eisenhower, authorizing In God We Trust as the U.S. national motto.
- 1962 – The Trans-Canada Highway, the then-longest national highway in the world, is officially opened.
- 1965 – U.S. president Lyndon B. Johnson signs the Social Security Act of 1965 into law, establishing Medicare and Medicaid.
- 1966 – England defeats West Germany to win the FIFA World Cup at Wembley Stadium 4–2 after extra time.
- 1969 – Vietnam War: U.S. president Richard Nixon makes an unscheduled visit to South Vietnam and meets with President Nguyễn Văn Thiệu and U.S. military commanders.
- 1971 – Apollo program: On Apollo 15, David Scott and James Irwin in the Apollo Lunar Module Falcon land on the Moon with the first Lunar Rover.
- 1971 – An All Nippon Airways Boeing 727 and a Japanese Air Force F-86 collide over Morioka, Iwate, Japan, killing 162.
- 1974 – Watergate scandal: U.S. President Richard Nixon releases subpoenaed White House recordings after being ordered to do so by the Supreme Court of the United States.
- 1975 – Jimmy Hoffa disappears from the parking lot of the Machus Red Fox restaurant in Bloomfield Hills, Michigan, a suburb of Detroit, at about 2:30 p.m. He is never seen or heard from again.
- 1978 – The 730: Okinawa Prefecture changes its traffic on the right-hand side of the road to the left-hand side.
- 1980 – Vanuatu gains independence.
- 1980 – Israel's Knesset passes the Jerusalem Law.
- 1981 – As many as 50,000 demonstrators, mostly women and children, take to the streets in Łódź to protest food ration shortages in Communist Poland.
- 1990 – Ian Gow, Conservative Member of Parliament, is assassinated at his home by the IRA in a car bombing after he assured the group that the British government would never surrender to them.
- 2003 – In Mexico, the last 'old style' Volkswagen Beetle rolls off the assembly line.
- 2003 – Three years after the death of the last Pyrenean ibex, Celia, a clone of her is born only to subsequently die from lung defects. Within minutes, the Pyrenean ibex becomes the first and so far only species to have ever gone de-extinct as well as go extinct twice.
- 2006 – The world's longest running music show Top of the Pops is broadcast for the last time on BBC Two. The show had aired for 42 years.
- 2006 – An Israeli airstrike kills 28 Lebanese civilians, including 16 children.
- 2011 – Marriage of Queen Elizabeth II's eldest granddaughter Zara Phillips to former rugby union footballer Mike Tindall.
- 2012 – A train fire kills 32 passengers and injures 27 on the Tamil Nadu Express in Andhra Pradesh, India.
- 2012 – A power grid failure in Delhi leaves more than 300 million people without power in northern India.
- 2014 – Twenty killed and 150 are trapped after a landslide in Maharashtra, India.
- 2020 – NASA's Mars 2020 mission is launched on an Atlas V rocket from Cape Canaveral Air Force Station.
- 2024 – A series of landslides occurs in Kerala, India, causing over 420 fatalities.
- 2025 – A magnitude 8.8 earthquake hits Russia, causing tsunamis over the Pacific Ocean.
- 2026 – Around 50,000 Moroccan nationals storm the borders of Spanish enclaves in Africa, principally the city of Ceuta. As of August 1, 2026, 67 are confirmed to have died while crossing.

== Births ==
=== Pre-1600 ===
- 1470 – Hongzhi, emperor of the Ming dynasty (died 1505)
- 1511 – Giorgio Vasari, Italian painter, historian, and architect (died 1574)
- 1549 – Ferdinando I de' Medici, Grand Duke of Tuscany (died 1609)

=== 1601–1900 ===
- 1641 – Regnier de Graaf, Dutch physician and anatomist (died 1673)
- 1751 – Maria Anna Mozart, Austrian pianist (died 1829)
- 1763 – Samuel Rogers, English poet and art collector (died 1855)
- 1781 – Maria Aletta Hulshoff, Dutch feminist and pamphleteer (died 1846)
- 1809 – Charles Chiniquy, Canadian-American priest and theologian (died 1899)
- 1818 – Emily Brontë, English novelist and poet (died 1848)
- 1818 – Jan Heemskerk, Dutch lawyer and politician, 16th and 19th Prime Minister of the Netherlands (died 1897)
- 1825 – Chaim Aronson, Lithuanian engineer and author (died 1893)
- 1832 – George Lemuel Woods, American lawyer, judge, and politician, 3rd Governor of Oregon (died 1890)
- 1855 – Georg Wilhelm von Siemens, German-Swiss businessman (died 1919)
- 1857 – Thorstein Veblen, American economist and sociologist (died 1929)
- 1859 – Henry Simpson Lunn, English minister and humanitarian, founded Lunn Poly (died 1939)
- 1862 – Nikolai Yudenich, Russian general (died 1933)
- 1863 – Henry Ford, American engineer and businessman, founded the Ford Motor Company (died 1947)
- 1872 – Princess Clémentine of Belgium (died 1955)
- 1881 – Smedley Butler, American general, Medal of Honor recipient (died 1940)
- 1890 – Casey Stengel, American baseball player and manager (died 1975)
- 1898 – Henry Moore, English sculptor and illustrator (died 1986)
- 1899 – Gerald Moore, English pianist (died 1987)

=== 1901–present ===
- 1901 – Alfred Lépine, Canadian ice hockey player and coach (died 1955)
- 1904 – Salvador Novo, Mexican poet and playwright (died 1974)
- 1909 – C. Northcote Parkinson, English historian and author (died 1993)
- 1910 – Edgar de Evia, Mexican-American photographer (died 2003)
- 1913 – Lou Darvas, American soldier and cartoonist (died 1987)
- 1914 – Michael Morris, 3rd Baron Killanin, Irish journalist and author, 6th President of the International Olympic Committee (died 1999)
- 1920 – Walter Schuck, German lieutenant and pilot (died 2015)
- 1921 – Grant Johannesen, American pianist and educator (died 2005)
- 1922 – Henry W. Bloch, American banker and businessman, co-founded H&R Block (died 2019)
- 1924 – C. T. Vivian, American minister, author, and activist (died 2020)
- 1925 – Stan Stennett, Welsh actor and trumpet player (died 2013)
- 1925 – Alexander Trocchi, Scottish author and poet (died 1984)
- 1926 – Betye Saar, American artist (died 2026)
- 1926 – George Shanard, American politician and businessman (died 2012)
- 1927 – Richard Johnson, English actor, producer, and screenwriter (died 2015)
- 1927 – Pete Schoening, American mountaineer (died 2004)
- 1927 – Victor Wong, American actor (died 2001)
- 1928 – Sulochana Latkar, Indian actress (died 2023)
- 1928 – Joe Nuxhall, American baseball player and sportscaster (died 2007)
- 1929 – Sid Krofft, Canadian-American puppeteer and producer (died 2026)
- 1931 – Dominique Lapierre, French historian and author (died 2022)
- 1931 – Marina Popovich, Soviet pilot, engineer and military officer (died 2017)
- 1934 – Bud Selig, 9th Major League Baseball Commissioner
- 1936 – Buddy Guy, American singer-songwriter and guitarist
- 1936 – Infanta Pilar, Duchess of Badajoz (died 2020)
- 1938 – Hervé de Charette, French politician, French Minister of Foreign Affairs
- 1938 – Terry O'Neill, English photographer (died 2019)
- 1939 – Peter Bogdanovich, American actor, director, producer, and screenwriter (died 2022)
- 1939 – Eleanor Smeal, American activist, founded the Feminist Majority Foundation
- 1940 – Patricia Schroeder, American lawyer and politician (died 2023)
- 1940 – Clive Sinclair, English businessman, founded Sinclair Radionics and Sinclair Research (died 2021)
- 1941 – Paul Anka, Canadian singer-songwriter and actor
- 1942 – Pollyanna Pickering, English environmentalist and painter (died 2018)
- 1943 – Henri-François Gautrin, Canadian physicist and politician
- 1944 – Gerry Birrell, Scottish race car driver (died 1973)
- 1944 – Peter Bottomley, English politician
- 1944 – Jimmy Cliff, Jamaican reggae singer (died 2025)
- 1944 – Frances de la Tour, English actress
- 1945 – Patrick Modiano, French novelist and screenwriter, Nobel Prize laureate
- 1945 – David Sanborn, American saxophonist and composer (died 2024)
- 1946 – Neil Bonnett, American race car driver and sportscaster (died 1994)
- 1946 – Jeffrey Hammond, English bass player
- 1947 – William Atherton, American actor and producer
- 1947 – Françoise Barré-Sinoussi, French virologist and biologist, Nobel Prize laureate
- 1947 – Jonathan Mann, American physician and author (died 1998)
- 1947 – Arnold Schwarzenegger, Austrian-American bodybuilder, actor, and politician, 38th Governor of California
- 1948 – Billy Paultz, American basketball player
- 1948 – Jean Reno, Spanish-French actor
- 1948 – Otis Taylor, American singer-songwriter and guitarist
- 1948 – Julia Tsenova, Bulgarian pianist and composer (died 2010)
- 1949 – Duck Baker, American guitarist
- 1949 – Sonia Proudman, English lawyer and judge (died 2023)
- 1950 – Harriet Harman, English lawyer and politician
- 1950 – Frank Stallone, American singer-songwriter and actor
- 1951 – Alan Kourie, South African cricketer
- 1951 – Gerry Judah, Indian-English painter and sculptor
- 1952 – Stephen Blackmore, English botanist and author
- 1954 – Ken Olin, American actor, director, and producer
- 1955 – Rat Scabies, English drummer and producer
- 1955 – Christopher Warren-Green, English violinist and conductor
- 1956 – Delta Burke, American actress
- 1956 – Réal Cloutier, Canadian ice hockey player
- 1956 – Georg Gänswein, German prelate, Prefect of the Pontifical Household, and former personal secretary to Pope Benedict XVI
- 1956 – Anita Hill, American lawyer and academic
- 1956 – Soraida Martinez, American painter and educator
- 1957 – Antonio Adamo, Italian director and cinematographer
- 1957 – Bill Cartwright, American basketball player and coach
- 1957 – Clint Hurdle, American baseball player and manager
- 1957 – Nery Pumpido, Argentinian footballer, coach, and manager
- 1958 – Kate Bush, English singer-songwriter and producer
- 1958 – Liz Kershaw, English radio broadcaster
- 1958 – Daley Thompson, English decathlete and trainer
- 1960 – Jennifer Barnes, American-English musicologist and academic
- 1960 – Richard Linklater, American director and screenwriter
- 1960 – Brillante Mendoza, Filipino independent film director
- 1961 – Laurence Fishburne, American actor and producer
- 1962 – Alton Brown, American chef, author, and producer
- 1962 – Jay Feaster, American ice hockey player and manager
- 1962 – Yakub Memon, Indian accountant and terrorist (died 2015)
- 1963 – Peter Bowler, English-Australian cricketer
- 1963 – Lisa Kudrow, American actress and producer
- 1963 – Antoni Martí, Andorran architect and politician
- 1963 – Chris Mullin, American basketball player, coach, and executive
- 1964 – Ron Block, American singer-songwriter and banjo player
- 1964 – Vivica A. Fox, American actress
- 1964 – Alek Keshishian, Lebanese-American director, producer, and screenwriter
- 1964 – Jürgen Klinsmann, German footballer and manager
- 1964 – Laine Randjärv, Estonian lawyer and politician, 6th Estonian Minister of Culture
- 1965 – Tim Munton, English cricketer
- 1966 – Kerry Fox, New Zealand actress and screenwriter
- 1966 – Craig Gannon, English guitarist and songwriter
- 1966 – Allan Langer, Australian rugby league player and coach
- 1966 – Sean Patrick Maloney, American politician
- 1966 – Louise Wener, English author and singer-songwriter
- 1968 – Terry Crews, American actor and football player
- 1968 – Robert Korzeniowski, Polish race walker and coach
- 1968 – Sean Moore, Welsh drummer and songwriter
- 1969 – Simon Baker, Australian actor, director, and producer
- 1969 – Errol Stewart, South African cricketer and lawyer
- 1970 – Alun Cairns, Welsh businessman and politician
- 1970 – Dean Edwards, American comedian, actor, and singer
- 1970 – Christopher Nolan, English-American director, producer, and screenwriter
- 1971 – Elvis Crespo, American-Puerto Rican singer
- 1971 – Tom Green, Canadian comedian and actor
- 1971 – Christine Taylor, American actress
- 1972 – Jim McIlvaine, American basketball player and sportscaster
- 1973 – Kenton Cool, English mountaineer
- 1973 – Ümit Davala, Turkish footballer and manager
- 1973 – Anastasios Katsabis, Greek footballer
- 1973 – Markus Näslund, Swedish ice hockey player and manager
- 1973 – Sonu Nigam, Indian playback singer and actor
- 1973 – Clementa C. Pinckney, American minister and politician (died 2015)
- 1974 – Radostin Kishishev, Bulgarian footballer and manager
- 1974 – Jason Robinson, English rugby league footballer, and rugby union footballer and coach
- 1974 – Hilary Swank, American actress and producer
- 1975 – Graham Nicholls, English author and activist
- 1975 – Kate Starbird, American basketball player and computer scientist
- 1977 – Diana Bolocco, Chilean model and journalist;
- 1977 – Misty May-Treanor, American volleyball player and coach
- 1977 – Jaime Pressly, American actress
- 1977 – Bootsy Thornton, American basketball player
- 1977 – Ian Watkins, Welsh former Lostprophets singer-songwriter and convicted child sex offender (died 2025)
- 1979 – Carlos Arroyo, Puerto Rican basketball player and singer
- 1979 – Chad Keegan, South African cricketer and coach
- 1979 – Graeme McDowell, Northern Irish golfer
- 1979 – Maya Nasser, Syrian journalist (died 2012)
- 1980 – Seth Avett, American folk-rock singer-songwriter and musician
- 1980 – Justin Rose, South African-English golfer
- 1981 – Nicky Hayden, American motorcycle racer (died 2017)
- 1981 – Juan Smith, South African rugby union footballer
- 1981 – Hope Solo, American soccer player
- 1981 – Indrek Turi, Estonian decathlete
- 1982 – Jehad Al-Hussain, Syrian footballer
- 1982 – James Anderson, English cricketer
- 1982 – Martin Starr, American actor and comedian
- 1982 – Yvonne Strahovski, Australian actress
- 1983 – Seán Dillon, Irish footballer
- 1984 – Marko Asmer, Estonian race car driver
- 1984 – Gabrielle Christian, American actress and singer
- 1984 – Ása Berglind Hjálmarsdóttir, Icelandic politician
- 1984 – Trudy McIntosh, Australian artistic gymnast
- 1984 – Kevin Pittsnogle, American basketball player
- 1984 – Gina Rodriguez, American actress
- 1985 – Chris Guccione, Australian tennis player
- 1985 – Daniel Fredheim Holm, Norwegian footballer
- 1985 – Luca Lanotte, Italian ice dancer
- 1985 – Matthew Scott, Australian rugby league player
- 1985 – Alex Goligoski, American ice hockey player
- 1986 – Tiago Alencar, Brazilian footballer
- 1986 – William Zillman, Australian rugby league player
- 1987 – Anton Fink, German footballer
- 1987 – Sam Saunders, American golfer
- 1988 – Wen Chean Lim, Malaysian rhythmic gymnast
- 1989 – Aleix Espargaró, Spanish motorcycle racer
- 1989 – Wayne Parnell, South African cricketer
- 1990 – Chris Maxwell, Welsh footballer
- 1990 – Tom Morris, Australian journalist
- 1990 – Shekinna Stricklen, American basketball player
- 1991 – Diana Vickers, English singer-songwriter
- 1992 – Hannah Cockroft, English wheelchair racer
- 1993 – Jake Faria, American baseball player
- 1993 – André Gomes, Portuguese footballer
- 1993 – Margarida Moura, Portuguese tennis player
- 1993 – Miho Miyazaki, Japanese singer
- 1994 – Nelydia Senrose, Malaysian actress
- 1995 – Hirving Lozano, Mexican footballer
- 1996 – Nina Stojanović, Serbian tennis player
- 1996 – Dylan Larkin, American hockey player
- 1996 – Ariel Atkins, American basketball player
- 1999 – Joey King, American actress
- 1999 – Tom Pidcock, professional cyclist and Olympian

== Deaths ==
=== Pre-1600 ===
- 578 – Jacob Baradaeus, Greek bishop
- 579 – Pope Benedict I
- 734 – Tatwine, English archbishop (born 670)
- 829 – Shi Xiancheng, general of the Tang Dynasty
- 1286 – Bar Hebraeus, Syrian scholar and historian (born 1226)
- 1393 – Alberto d'Este, Lord of Ferrara and Modena (born 1347)
- 1516 – John V, Count of Nassau-Siegen (born 1455)
- 1540 – Thomas Abel, English priest and martyr (born 1497)
- 1540 – Robert Barnes, English martyr and reformer (born 1495)
- 1550 – Thomas Wriothesley, 1st Earl of Southampton, English politician, Lord Chancellor of the United Kingdom (born 1505)
- 1566 – Guillaume Rondelet, French doctor (born 1507)

=== 1601–1900 ===
- 1608 – Rory O'Donnell, 1st Earl of Tyrconnell, last King of Tyrconnell (born 1575)
- 1624 – Esmé Stewart, 3rd Duke of Lennox, British nobleman (born 1579)
- 1652 – Charles Amadeus, Duke of Nemours (born 1624)
- 1680 – Thomas Butler, 6th Earl of Ossory, Irish admiral and politician, Lord Lieutenant of Ireland (born 1634)
- 1683 – Maria Theresa of Spain (born 1638)
- 1691 – Daniel Georg Morhof, German scholar and academic (born 1639)
- 1700 – Prince William, Duke of Gloucester, English royal (born 1689)
- 1718 – William Penn, English businessman and philosopher, founded the Province of Pennsylvania (born 1644)
- 1771 – Thomas Gray, English poet (born 1716)
- 1811 – Miguel Hidalgo y Costilla, Mexican priest and soldier (born 1753)
- 1832 – Lê Văn Duyệt, Vietnamese general, mandarin (born 1763–4)
- 1870 – Aasmund Olavsson Vinje, Norwegian poet and journalist (born 1818)
- 1875 – George Pickett, American general (born 1825)
- 1889 – Charlie Absolom, England cricketer (born 1846)
- 1898 – Otto von Bismarck, German lawyer and politician, 1st Chancellor of Germany (born 1815)
- 1900 – Alfred, Duke of Saxe-Coburg and Gotha (born 1844)

=== 1901–present ===
- 1912 – Emperor Meiji of Japan (born 1852)
- 1918 – Joyce Kilmer, American soldier, journalist, and poet (born 1886)
- 1920 – Albert Gustaf Dahlman, Swedish executioner (born 1848)
- 1930 – Joan Gamper, Swiss-Spanish footballer and businessman, founded FC Barcelona (born 1877)
- 1938 – John Derbyshire, English swimmer and water polo player (born 1878)
- 1941 – Hugo Celmiņš, Latvian politician, former Prime Minister of Latvia (born 1877)
- 1947 – Joseph Cook, English-Australian miner and politician, 6th Prime Minister of Australia (born 1860)
- 1965 – Jun'ichirō Tanizaki, Japanese author and playwright (born 1886)
- 1970 – Walter Murdoch, Scottish-Australian academic (born 1874)
- 1970 – George Szell, Hungarian-American conductor and composer (born 1897)
- 1971 – Thomas Hollway, Australian politician, 36th Premier of Victoria (born 1906)
- 1975 – James Blish, American author and critic (born 1921)
- 1977 – Emory Holloway, American scholar, author, and educator (born 1885)
- 1983 – Howard Dietz, American songwriter and publicist (born 1896)
- 1983 – Lynn Fontanne, English actress (born 1887)
- 1985 – Julia Robinson, American mathematician and theorist (born 1919)
- 1989 – Lane Frost, American professional bull rider (born 1963)
- 1990 – Ian Gow, British Member of Parliament who was assassinated by the IRA (born 1937)
- 1992 – Brenda Marshall, Filipino-American actress and singer (born 1915)
- 1992 – Joe Shuster, Canadian-American illustrator, co-created Superman (born 1914)
- 1994 – Konstantin Kalser, German-American film producer and advertising executive (born 1920)
- 1996 – Claudette Colbert, French-American actress (born 1903)
- 1998 – Buffalo Bob Smith, American television host (born 1917)
- 2001 – Anton Schwarzkopf, German engineer (born 1924)
- 2003 – Steve Hislop, Scottish motorcycle racer (born 1962)
- 2003 – Sam Phillips, American record producer, founded Sun Records (born 1923)
- 2005 – Ray Cunningham, American baseball player (born 1905)
- 2005 – John Garang, Sudanese colonel and politician, 6th President of South Sudan (born 1945)
- 2006 – Duygu Asena, Turkish journalist and author(born 1946)
- 2006 – Al Balding, Canadian golfer (born 1924)
- 2006 – Murray Bookchin, American philosopher and author (born 1921)
- 2006 – Anthony Galla-Rini, American accordion player and composer (born 1904)
- 2006 – Akbar Mohammadi, Iranian activist (born 1972)
- 2007 – Michelangelo Antonioni, Italian director and screenwriter (born 1912)
- 2007 – Teoctist Arăpașu, Romanian patriarch (born 1915)
- 2007 – Ingmar Bergman, Swedish director, producer, and screenwriter (born 1918)
- 2007 – Bill Walsh, American football player and coach (born 1931)
- 2008 – Anne Armstrong, American businesswoman and diplomat, United States Ambassador to the United Kingdom (born 1927)
- 2009 – Mohammed Yusuf, Nigerian militant leader, founded Boko Haram (born 1970)
- 2009 – Peter Zadek, German director and screenwriter (born 1926)
- 2011 – Bob Peterson, American basketball player (born 1932)
- 2012 – Maeve Binchy, Irish author, playwright, and journalist (born 1939)
- 2012 – Bill Doss, American singer and guitarist (born 1968)
- 2012 – Stig Ossian Ericson, Swedish actor, director, and screenwriter (born 1923)
- 2012 – Les Green, English footballer and manager (born 1941)
- 2012 – Jonathan Hardy, New Zealand-Australian actor and screenwriter (born 1940)
- 2012 – Bill Kitchen, Canadian ice hockey player (born 1960)
- 2012 – Mary Louise Rasmuson, American colonel (born 1911)
- 2013 – Cecil Alexander, American architect, designed the State of Georgia Building (born 1918)
- 2013 – Berthold Beitz, German businessman (born 1913)
- 2013 – Robert Neelly Bellah, American sociologist and author (born 1927)
- 2013 – Harry F. Byrd Jr., American lieutenant, publisher, and politician (born 1914)
- 2013 – Antoni Ramallets, Spanish footballer and manager (born 1924)
- 2013 – Ossie Schectman, American basketball player (born 1919)
- 2013 – Benjamin Walker, Indian-English author, poet, and playwright (born 1913)
- 2014 – Robert Drew, American director and producer (born 1924)
- 2014 – Harun Farocki, German director, producer, and screenwriter (born 1944)
- 2014 – Julio Grondona, Argentinian businessman (born 1931)
- 2014 – Peter Hall, English geographer, author, and academic (born 1932)
- 2014 – Dick Smith, American make-up artist (born 1922)
- 2014 – Dick Wagner, American singer-songwriter and guitarist (born 1942)
- 2015 – Lynn Anderson, American singer (born 1947)
- 2015 – Stuart Baggs, English businessman (born 1988)
- 2015 – Endel Lippmaa, Estonian physicist (born 1930)
- 2015 – Francis Paul Prucha, American historian and academic (born 1921)
- 2015 – Alena Vrzáňová, Czech figure skater (born 1931)
- 2016 – Gloria DeHaven, American actress, singer, and dancer (born 1925)
- 2018 – Michael A. Sheehan, American author, former government official and military officer (born 1955)
- 2020 – Lee Teng-hui, Taiwanese politician, President (1988–2000), Vice President (1984–1988) and mayor of Taipei (1978–1981) (born 1923)
- 2020 – Herman Cain, American businessman and political activist (born 1945)
- 2021 – Shona Ferguson, Botswana-born, South African actor and executive producer (born 1974)
- 2022 – Pat Carroll, American actress and comedian (born 1927)
- 2022 – Nichelle Nichols, American actress, singer and dancer (born 1932)
- 2023 – Paul Reubens, American actor and comedian (born 1952)
- 2024 – Onyeka Onwenu, Nigerian singer, actress and politician (born 1952)
- 2025 – David Argue, Australian actor (born 1959)
- 2025 – George Nigh, American politician, 17th and 22nd Governor of Oklahoma (born 1927)

== Holidays and observances ==
- Christian feast day:
  - Abdon and Sennen
  - Blessed Edward Powell, Richard Fetherston and Thomas Abel
  - Hatebrand
  - María Natividad Venegas de la Torre
  - Maxima, Donatilla, and Secunda
  - Robert Barnes (Lutheran)
  - Tatwine
  - Ursus of Auxerre
  - Vicenta Chávez Orozco
  - Solanus Casey
  - July 30 (Eastern Orthodox liturgics)
- Feast of the Throne (Morocco)
- Independence Day, celebrates the independence of Vanuatu from the United Kingdom and France in 1980.
- International Day of Friendship (international), and its related observances:
  - Día del Amigo (Paraguay)
- Martyrs Day (South Sudan)
