= Kerala Express =

Train in India

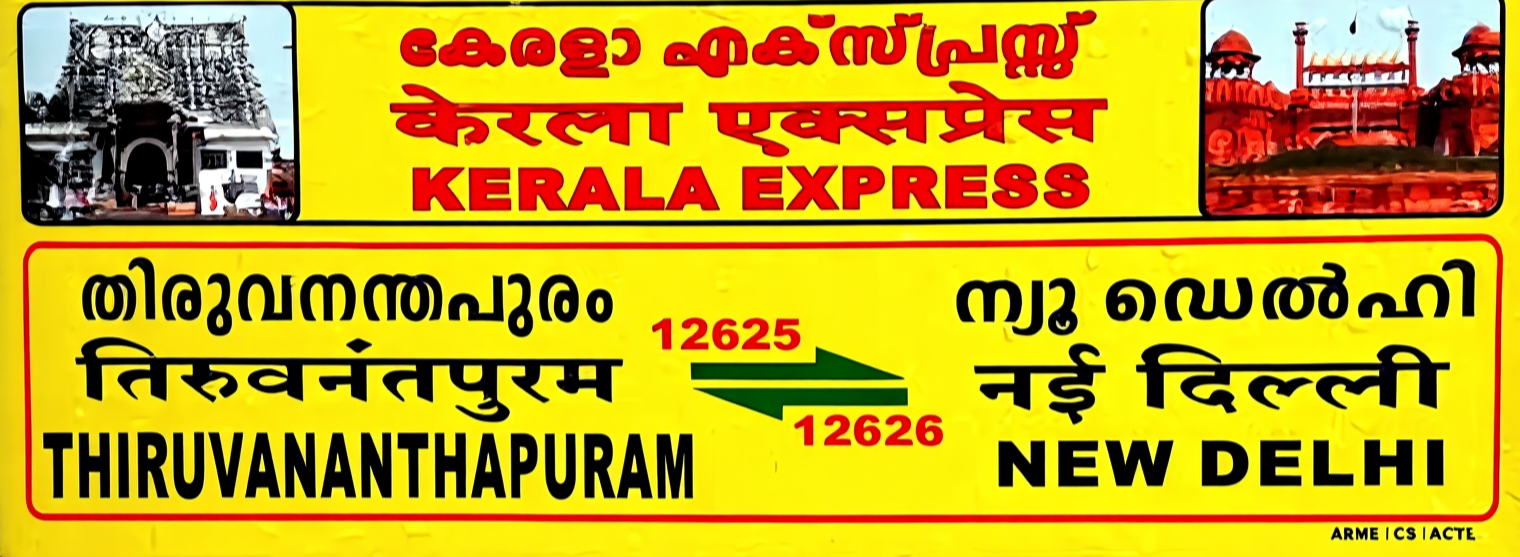

Overview
- Service type: Superfast
- First service: 10 January 1977; 49 years ago (split train as Karnataka–Kerala (KK) Express ) 1983; 43 years ago (as Kerala Express)
- Current operator: Southern Railway

Route
- Termini: New Delhi (NDLS); Thiruvananthapuram Central (TVC)
- Stops: 41
- Distance travelled: 3,031 km (1,883 mi)
- Average journey time: 49 hours 25 minutes
- Service frequency: Daily
- Train number: 12625 / 12626

On-board services
- Classes: AC 2 Tier, AC 3 Tier, AC 3 Tier Economy, Sleeper Class, General Unreserved
- Seating arrangements: Yes
- Sleeping arrangements: Yes
- Catering facilities: Available
- Observation facilities: Large windows
- Baggage facilities: Available
- Other facilities: Below the seats

Technical
- Rolling stock: LHB coach
- Track gauge: 1,676 mm (5 ft 6 in)
- Operating speed: 130 km/h (81 mph) maximum, 61 km/h (38 mph) average including halts.
Route map
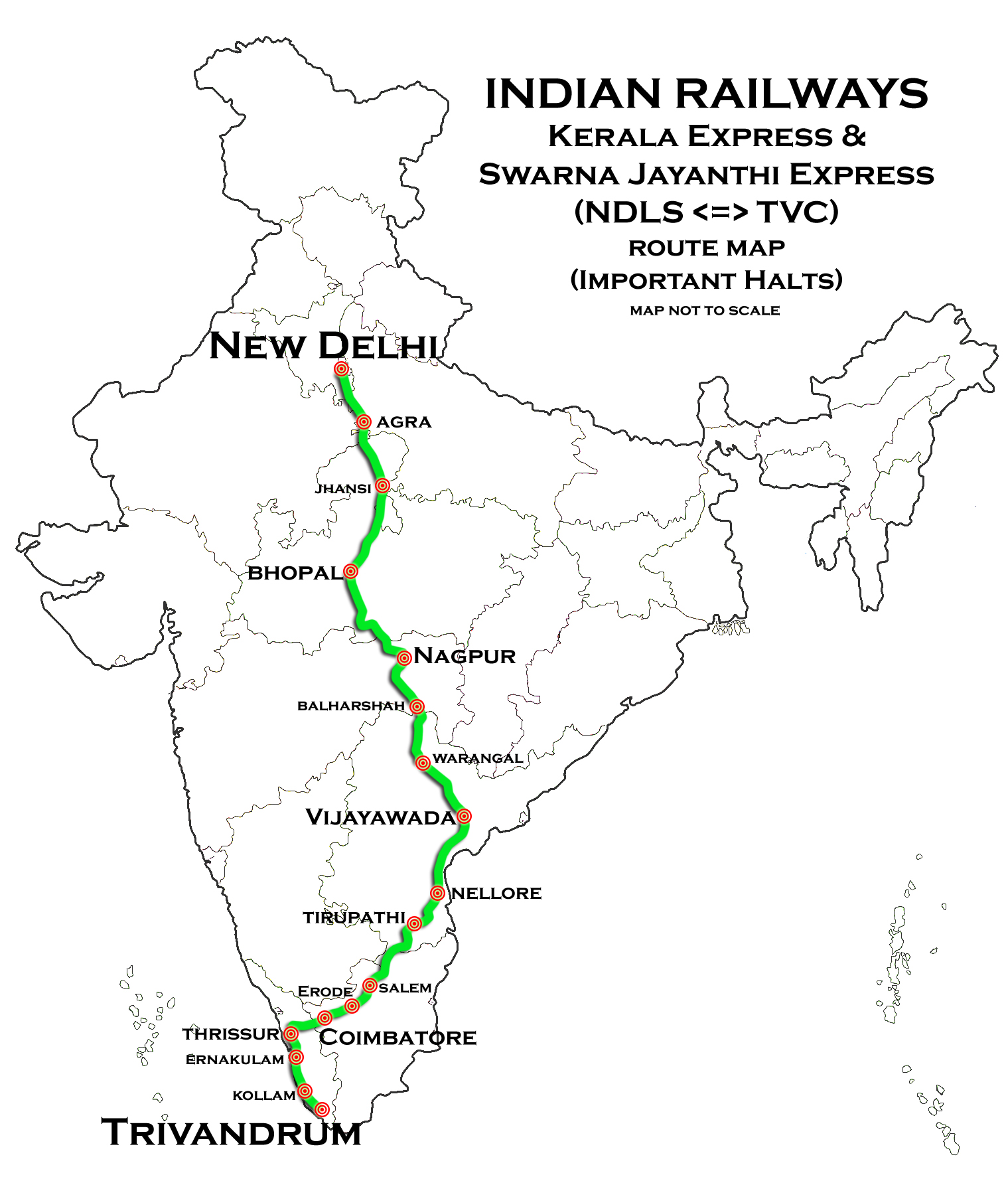

The 12625 / 12626 Kerala Express is a superfast express train of the Indian Railways that connects the National Capital of India New Delhi to State Capital of Kerala Thiruvananthapuram Central. It is the second longest running daily train in India after 22503/22504 Dibrugarh Kanniyakumari Dibrugarh Vivek Superfast Express which runs daily that travels 4139 km in more than 70 hours . The Kerala express travels 3031 km of distance in 51 hours and 10 minutes .

== History ==
The Kerala Express was introduced in 1977 as a split train named Karnataka–Kerala (KK) Express. The composition of Karnataka–Kerala Express has been increased from 14 coaches to 21 coaches with effect from 29 January 1981.

Kerala Exp briefly also had a link portion to Mangalore between 1987 and 1992, where a portion of this train used to bifurcate/amalgamate at Palakkad Junction. It was Christined 2625/2626A Link Mangala Exp. This arrangement continued until Mangala Exp was made an independent train in 1993. That train is now the Mangala-Lakshadweep Express.

The train is running with LHB rakes with effect from 4 November 2018.

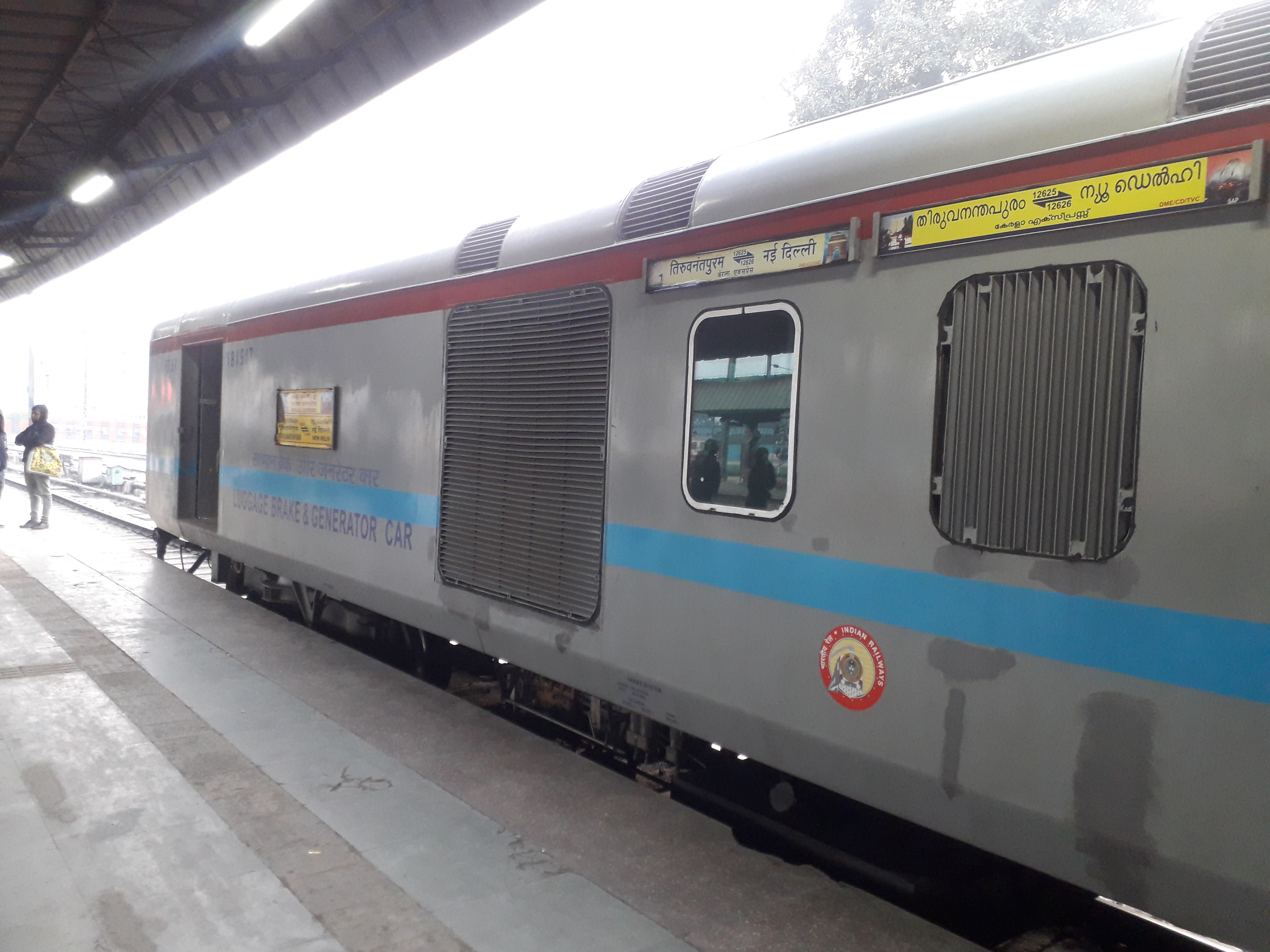
Kerala Express – LHB coach – End on Generator coach

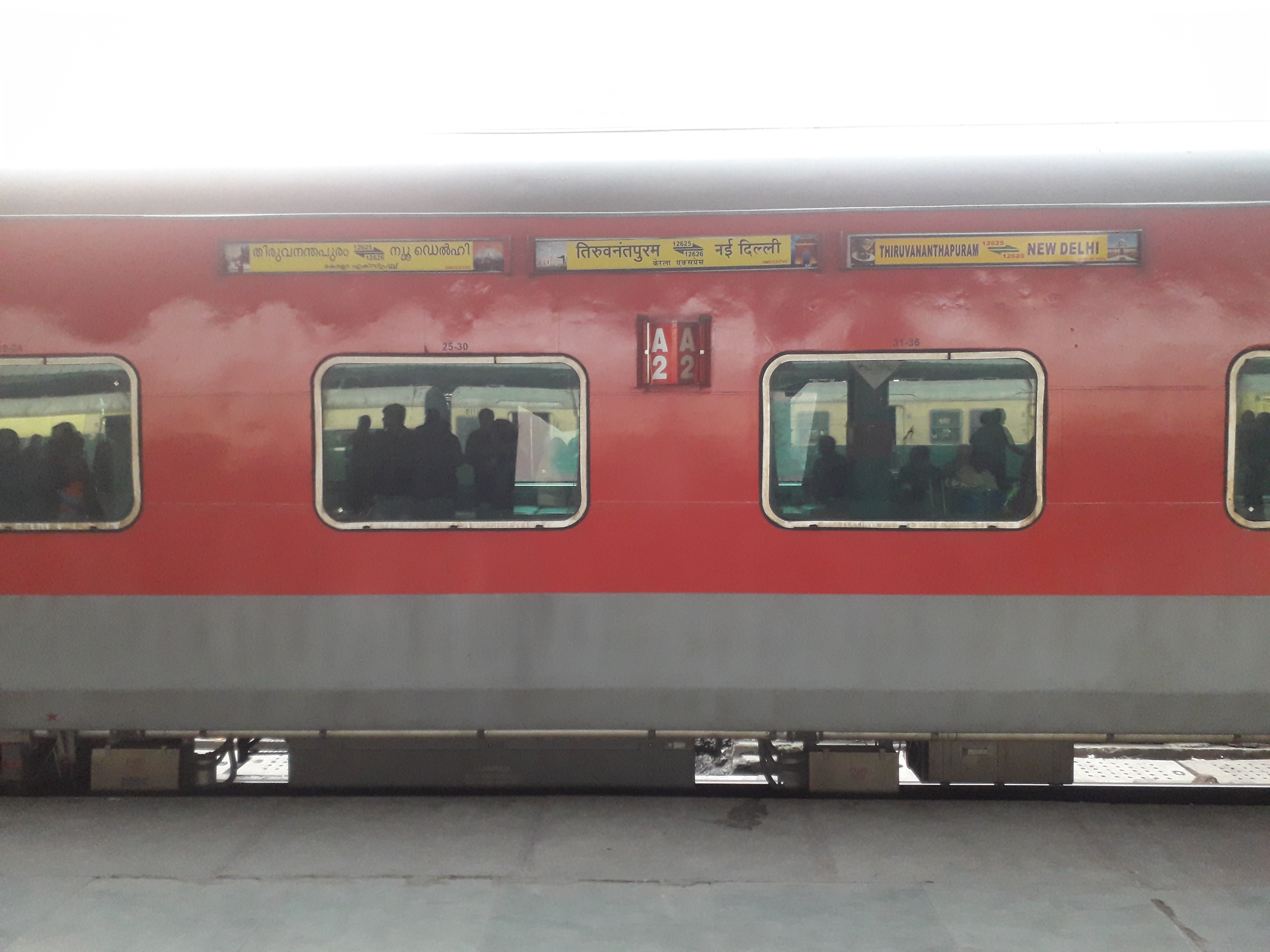
Kerala Express – LHB coach – AC 2 tier

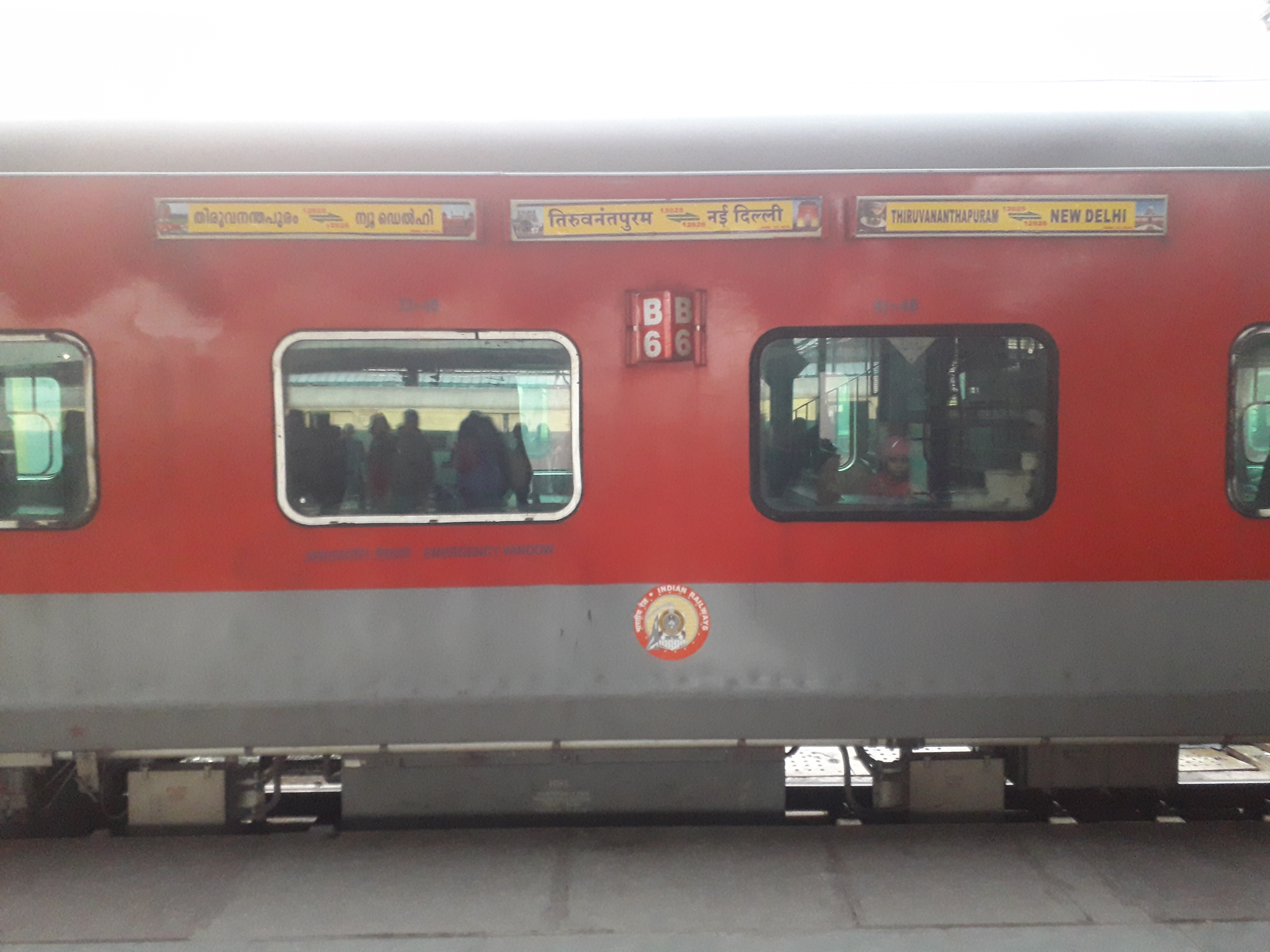
Kerala Express – LHB coach – AC 3 tier

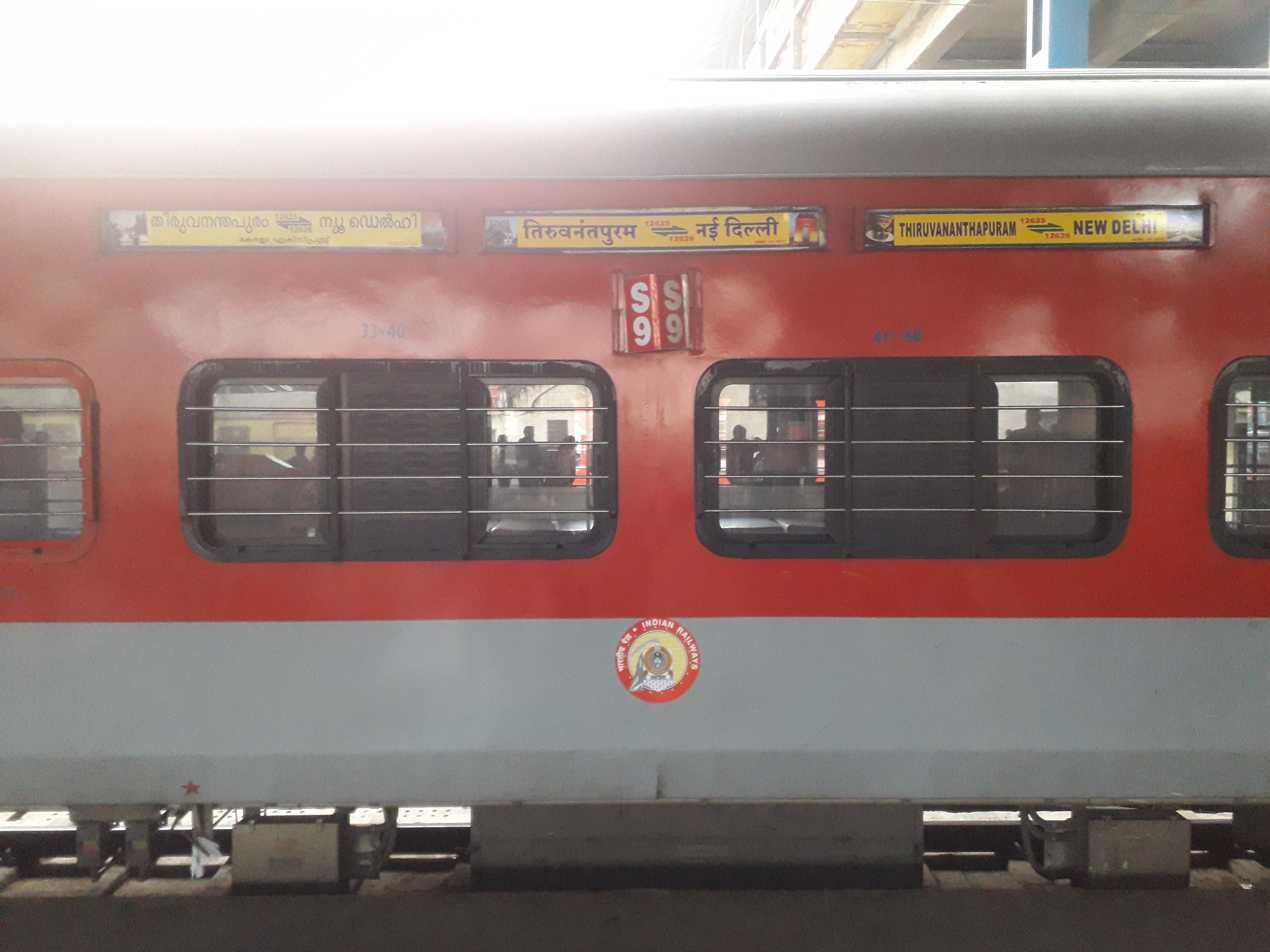
Kerala Express – LHB coach – Sleeper class

== Traction ==
earlier it was WAP-4. It is hauled by a Royapuram Loco Shed / Erode Loco Shed based WAP-7 electric locomotive from end to end.

== See also ==
- Rajdhani Express
- Kerala Sampark Kranti Express
- Mangala Lakshadweep Express
- Vivek Express
- TN Express
- Thiruvananthapuram Central
- New Delhi
