= Vivek Express =

Indian express trains

Overview
- Service type: Vivek Express
- Locale: Assam, Nagaland, West Bengal, Bihar, Jharkhand, Odisha, Andhra Pradesh, Kerala & Tamil Nadu
- First service: 19 November 2011; 14 years ago
- Current operator: Northeast Frontier Railway

Route
- Termini: Dibrugarh (DBRG); Kanniyakumari (CAPE)
- Stops: 57
- Distance travelled: 4,154 km (2,581 mi)
- Service frequency: Daily

On-board services
- Classes: AC 2 Tier, AC 3 Tier, Sleeper Class, General Unreserved
- Disabled access: Disabled access
- Seating arrangements: Yes
- Auto-rack arrangements: Yes
- Catering facilities: Available
- Observation facilities: Large windows
- Entertainment facilities: Yes
- Baggage facilities: Available
- Other facilities: Large windows

Technical
- Rake sharing: N/A (8 dedicated rakes)
Route map
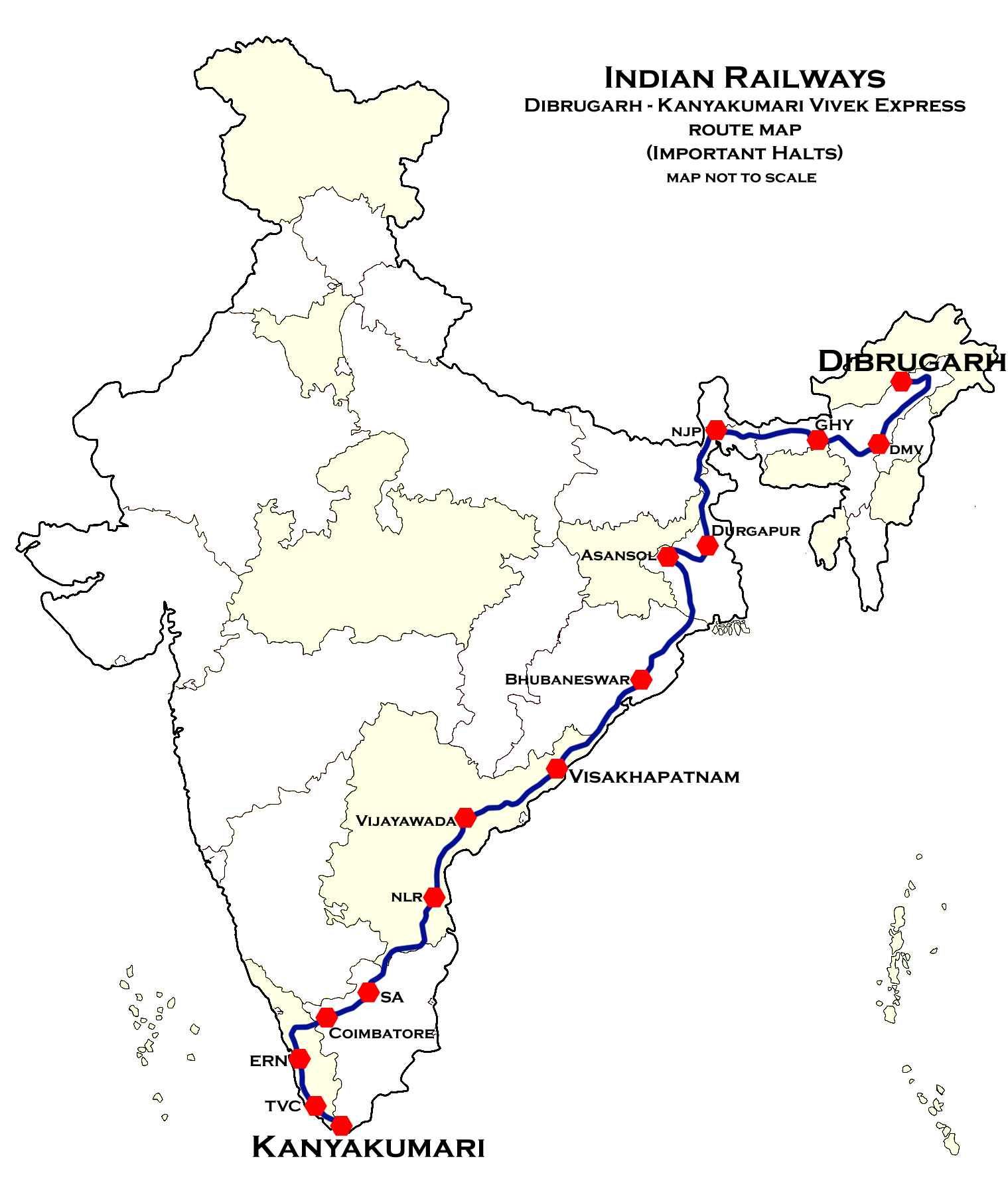
- Dibrugarh - Kanniyakumari Vivek Express Route map

Dibrugarh - Kanyakumari Vivek Express

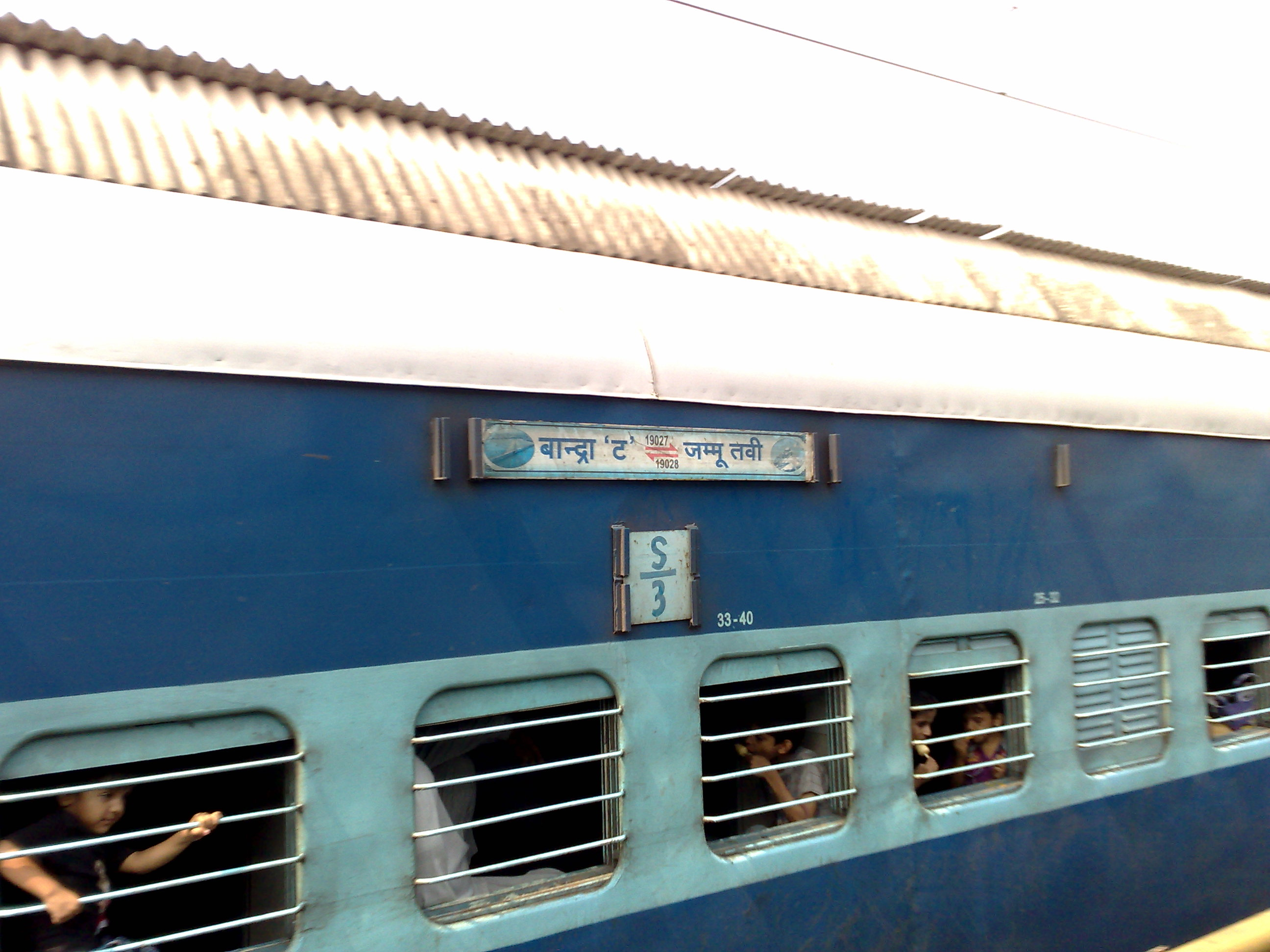
19027 Vivek Express

Vivek Express refers to multiple related express trains on the Indian Railways network. These services were launched in 2013 to commemorate the 150th birth anniversary of Swami Vivekananda. One of the Vivek Express trains, the one from Dibrugarh to Kanyakumari, is the longest route on the Indian Railways network, in terms of distance and time, and is currently the 28th longest in the world.

== Traction ==
Earlier some of the first Vivek Express trains ran with Diesel traction like Vatva-based WDM-3A or WDM-3D and Sabramati-based WDP-4. Now they use Electric traction like WAP-4, WAP-5 and WAP-7.

== List of Vivek Express Trains ==
As of June 2024, there are 4 pairs of Vivek Express trains.

=== Dibrugarh - Kanniyakumari Vivek Superfast Express ===
This Daily Superfast train, numbered 22503 / 22504, is currently the longest train route in the Indian subcontinent. It connects Dibrugarh to Kanniyakumari. It runs 4155 km in 74:20 hours with 57 intermediate stops. This train runs through Assam, Nagaland, West Bengal, Bihar, Odisha, Andhra Pradesh, Kerala and Tamil Nadu. This train also passes through Sahibganj district and Pakur district of Jharkhand but it does not have any stoppages there.

This train covers important cities en route, such as Dimapur, Guwahati, Bongaigaon, Siliguri, Malda, Rampurhat, Kolkata (Dankuni), Cuttack, Bhubaneswar, Berhampur, Visakhapatnam, Vijayawada, Nellore, Tirupati, Salem, Erode, Tiruppur, Coimbatore, Kochi (Ernakulam Town) and Thiruvananthapuram.

=== Okha - Tuticorin Vivek Express ===
This too, is a weekly train, numbered 19567/19568. It connects Okha, Gujarat (which is the westernmost tip of India) to Thoothukudi, the "Pearl City", in Tamil Nadu in South India. This train covers 3043 km in 54:25 hours. It travels through the states of Gujarat, Maharashtra, Andhra Pradesh, Karnataka and Tamil Nadu.

This train is also religiously important, as it joins two places of religious significance, namely Lord Krishna's Dwarka and Rameswaram, which lies close to Thoothukudi.

The train covers important cities en route, namely Rajkot, Ahmedabad, Vadodara, Surat, Mumbai Vasai Road, Kalyan, Pune, Kalaburagi, Raichur, Bangalore (Krishnarajapuram), Salem, Karur and Madurai.

=== Bandra Terminus Jammu Tawi Vivek Express ===
This train seeks its origin from Bandra Terminus, one of the main stations in Mumbai. This train, 19027/19028, like other Vivek Expresses, is also a weekly train from Bandra Terminus, Mumbai to Jammu Tawi in North India. However, unlike other typical North Indian trains, this train bypasses New Delhi or Delhi NCR. It goes via Surat, Vadodara, Ahmedabad, Mehsana, Abu Road, Jodhpur, Degana, Churu, Sadulpur, Hisar, Ludhiana, Jalandhar and Chakki Bank, thus bypassing Delhi NCR.

=== Santragachi - Mangalore Central Vivek Express ===
The 22851/22852 Vivek Express links Santragachhi, a town in the vicinity of Howrah, Kolkata in West Bengal to Mangalore Central in Karnataka. This is also a weekly train, which comes under the Superfast category of the Indian Railways, unlike other Vivek Expresses. This train passes through the states of West Bengal, Odisha, Andhra Pradesh, Tamil Nadu, Kerala and Karnataka. Important cities en route are Odisha {Bhubaneswar, Brahmapur}, Andhra Pradesh {Vizianagaram, Visakhapatnam, Rajahmundry, Eluru, Vijayawada, Nellore, Tirupati}, Tamil Nadu {Salem, Erode, Tiruppur, Coimbatore}, Kerala {Palakkad, Tirur, Kozhikode, Kannur and Kasaragod}.

== Route maps ==
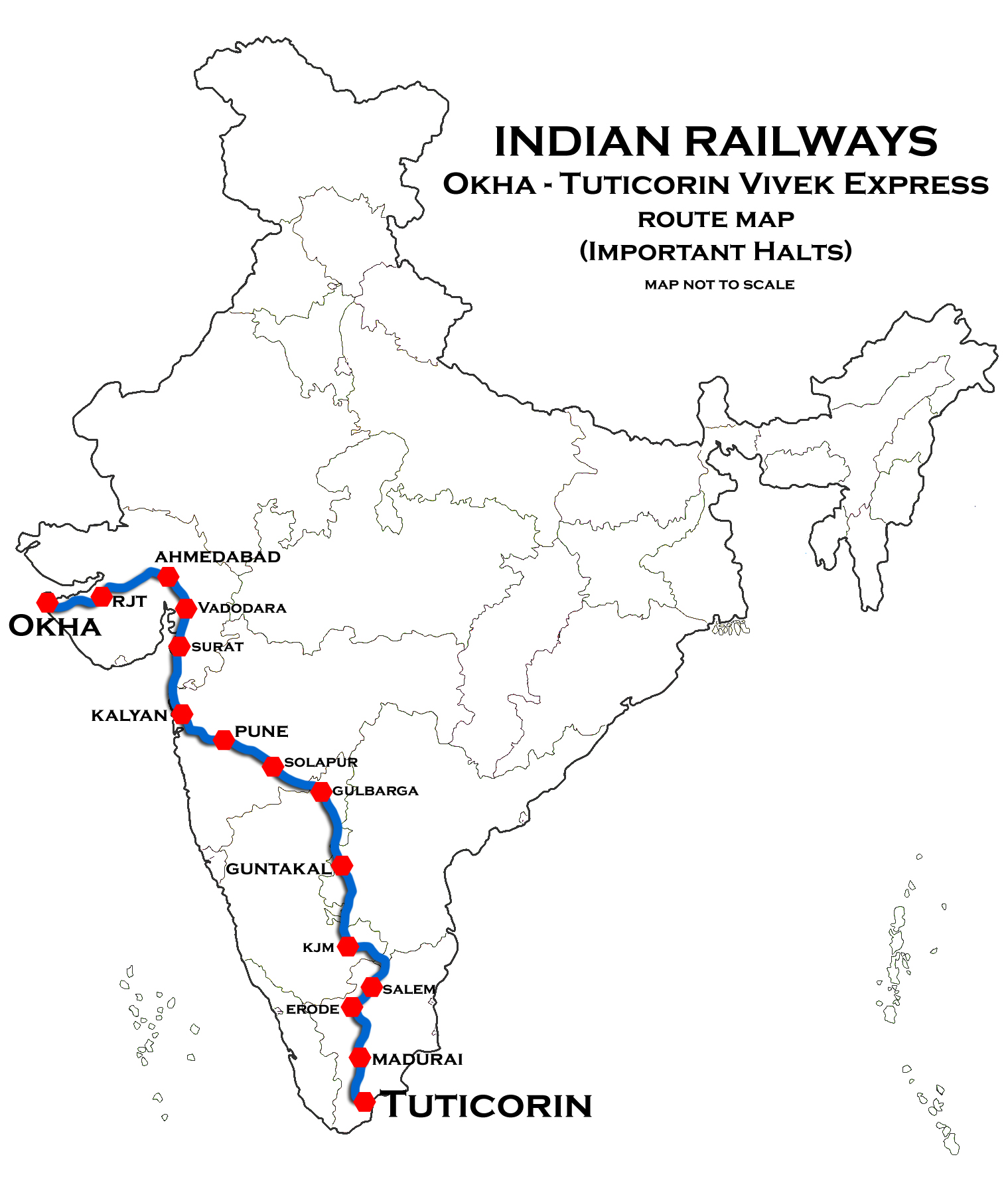
Okha - Tuticorin Vivek Express route map

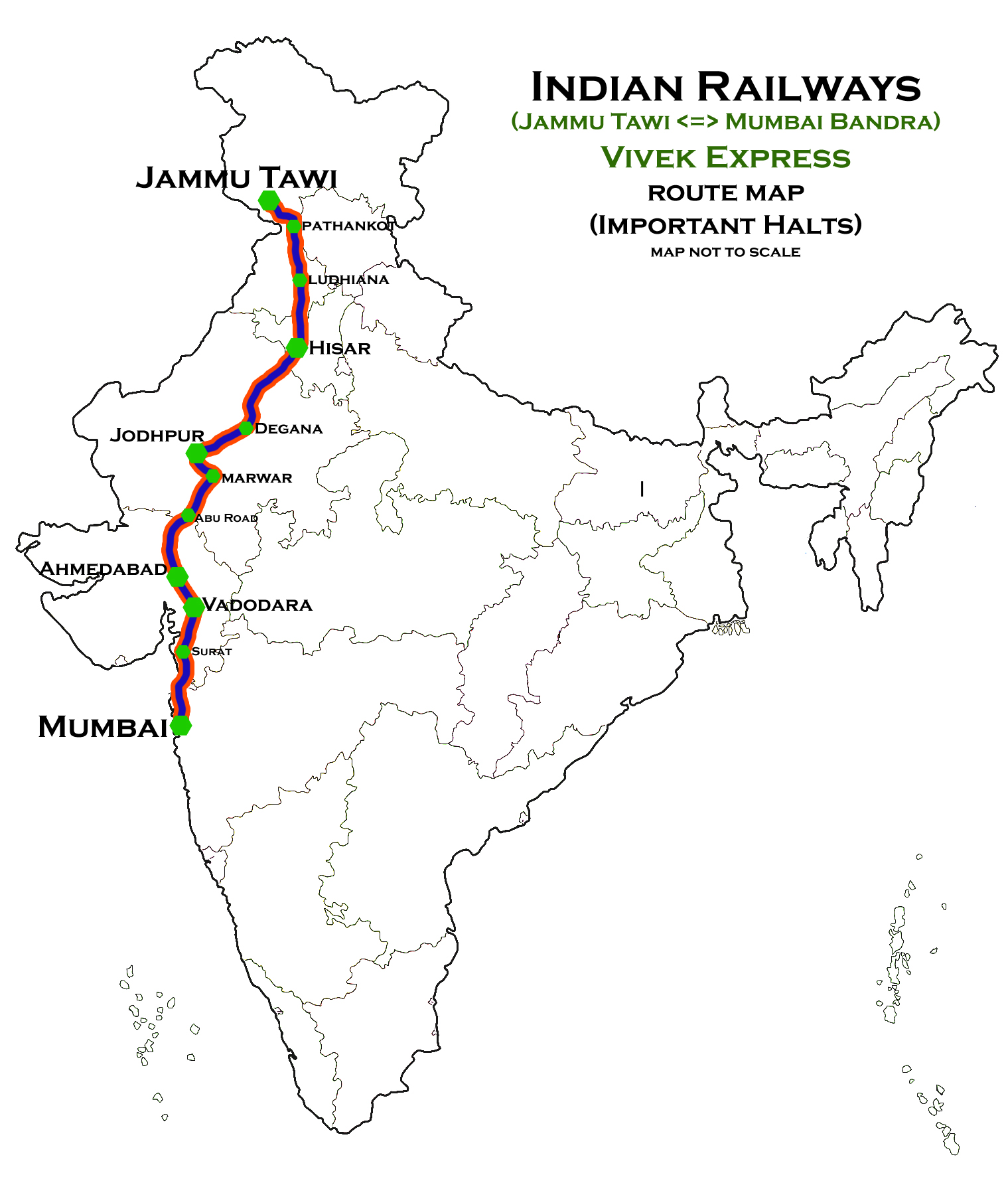
Jammu Tawi - Mumbai Vivek Express route map

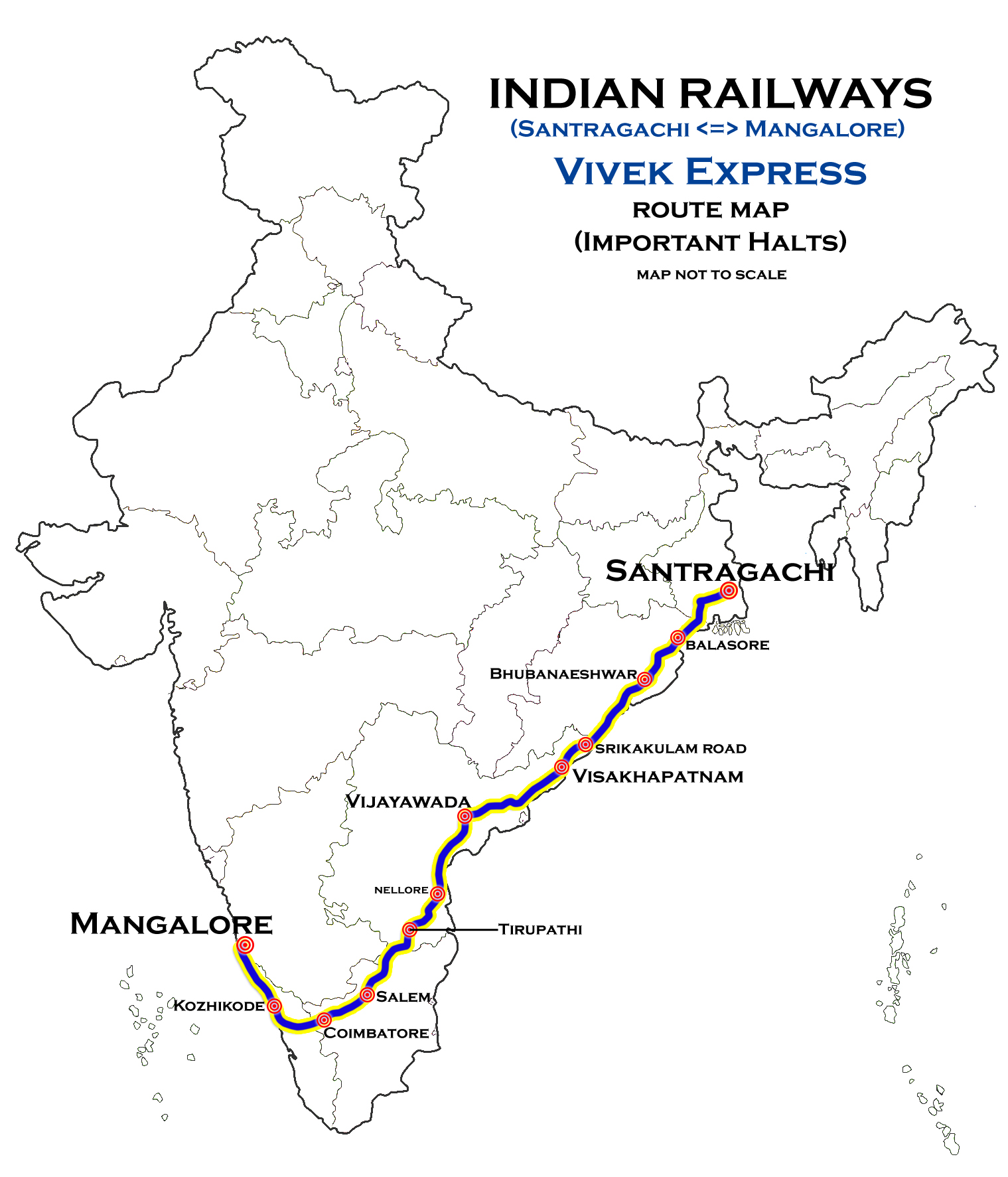
(Santragachi - Mangalore) Vivek Express route map

== Abandoned plans ==
Owing to the positive response to Vivek Express trains by the masses, the Railway Ministry was at one point considering starting a new Vivek Express in the North to East Corridor, between Jammu Tawi and North East India. Vivek Express trains currently run from East to South, South to West, West to North and again East to South India respectively. The proposed fifth North to East Vivek Express would have completed the quadrilateral.

== See also ==
- Himsagar Express
- Tamil Nadu Express
- Video of Vivek Express
- Longest Train ride in India
