= Alencar Santana =

Brazilian politician (born 1976)

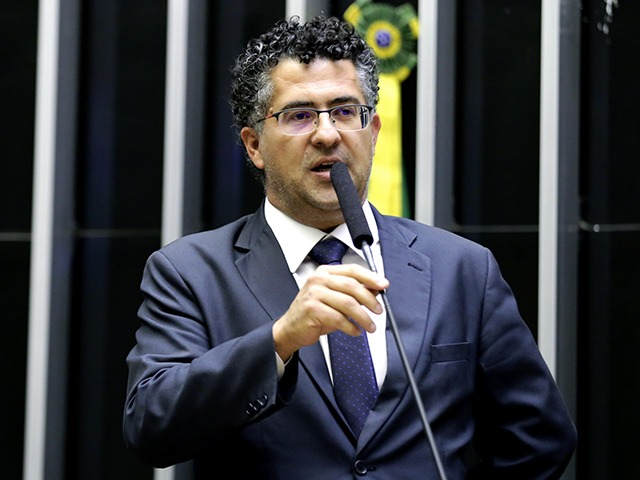

Member of the Chamber of Deputies
- Incumbent
- Assumed office 1 February 2019
- Constituency: São Paulo

Member of the Legislative Assembly of São Paulo
- In office 15 March 2011 – 1 February 2019
- Constituency: At-large

Member of the Municipal Chamber of Guarulhos
- In office 1 January 2005 – 15 March 2011
- Constituency: At-large

Personal details
- Born: Alencar Santana Braga; 14 March 1976 (age 50) São Paulo, Brazil
- Party: PT (1998–present)
- Profession: Lawyer
- Website: www.alencarbraga13.com.br

Alencar Santana Braga (born 14 March 1976) is a Brazilian politician from the Workers' Party. He has been Minority Leader of the Chamber of Deputies since 16 February 2022.
