= Nellore train fire =

2012 public transit disaster in Andhra Pradesh, India

Details
- Date: 04:22, 30 July 2012 (+05:30)
- Location: Nellore, Andhra Pradesh
- Country: India
- Line: Tamil Nadu Express
- Incident type: Fire
- Cause: Under investigation

Statistics
- Trains: 1
- Deaths: 32
- Injured: 27
- Damage: 1 coach burned

On 30 July 2012, the Chennai-bound Tamil Nadu Express train caught fire at 4:22 am near Nellore, Andhra Pradesh, India. At least 32 passengers died and 27 were injured. The fire gutted the S-11 sleeper coach in 20 minutes. A railway emergency crew prevented the fire from spreading to the other coaches.

== The train ==
The fire took place on the Tamil Nadu Express train (No. 12622) that originated in New Delhi and was bound for Chennai, Tamil Nadu. There were 72 passengers in the reserved S-11 sleeper coach and at least 6 unreserved passengers.

== The fire ==
The train passed through the Nellore station at 4:15 am on July 30, 2012, and caught fire at 4:22 am. It was moving at a speed of around 70 kilometres per hour (43 mph). The driver stopped the train after a gateman at a railway crossing spotted smoke and fire from the S-11 coach and alerted authorities. Due to sweeping winds, the coach was quickly engulfed in flames.

Around 25 passengers managed to escape the fire from the rear exit, and 10 others escaped by jumping from the train. At least 15 people died trying to escape from the forward exit, and others died in their sleeping berths. Twenty-seven people were admitted to hospitals in Nellore. A railway emergency crew was on the scene rapidly and detached the burning coach from the other coaches, preventing the fire from spreading to the rest of the train.

== Investigation ==
The local district police believe that the fire was caused by a short circuit, but the railway officials would not rule out possible sabotage. Some passengers reportedly heard an explosion before the flames broke out, while the speed of the fire's spreading and the reported discovery of a kerosene can, has raised further suspicion.

The Indian government announced that the next of kin of passengers who died would receive ₹ 500,000 (US$9,100) as compensation.

== See also ==
- List of Indian rail incidents
- List of rail accidents (2010–2019)
- List of transportation fires
