= Alencar Peak =

Peak in Antarctica

Alencar Peak (65°24′S 63°53′W) is a 1,555-metre (5,100 ft) peak at the head of Lind Glacier, standing 6 nautical miles (11 km) east of Cape Perez on the west side of Graham Land in Antarctica. It was discovered by the French Antarctic Expedition of 1908–10 under Jean-Baptiste Charcot and was named by him for Admiral Alexandrino Faria de Alencar, a Brazilian Navy Minister at the time.
