= Alencar (crater) =

Crater on Mercury

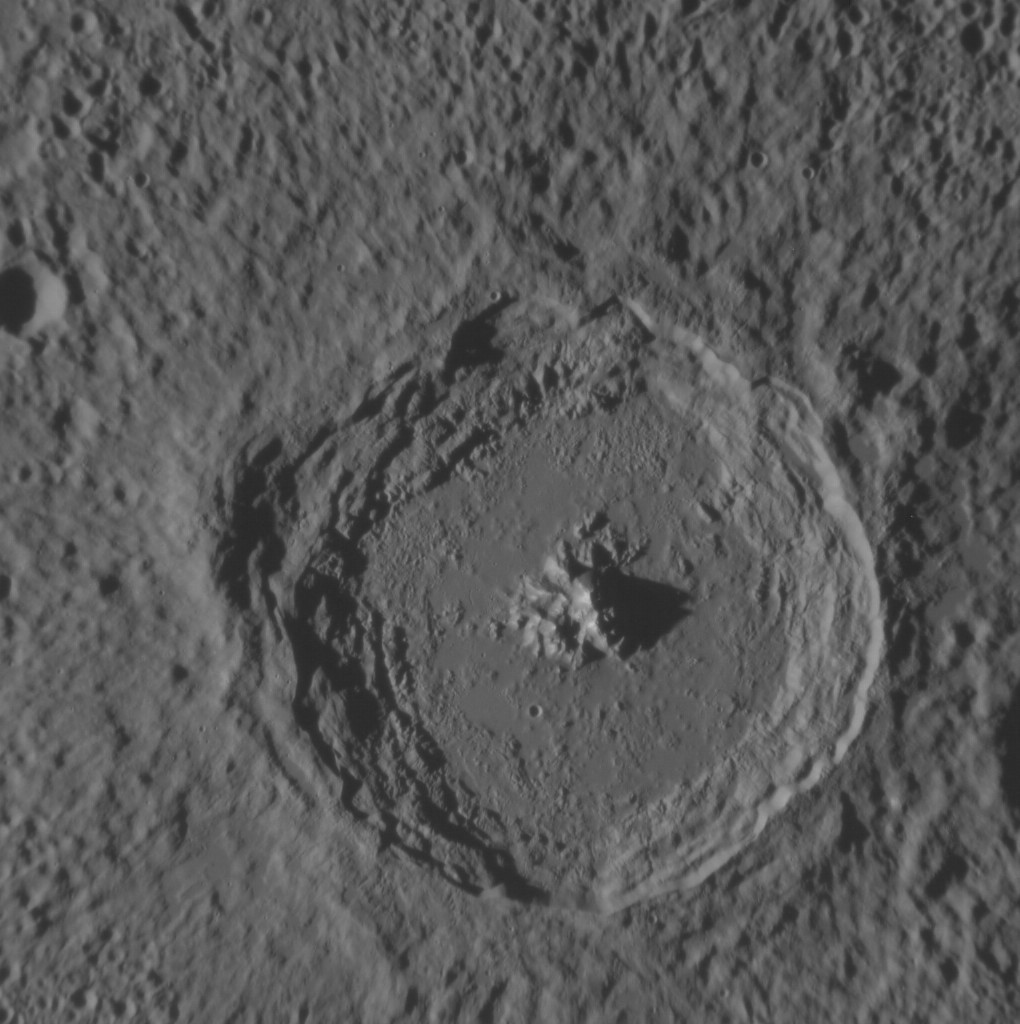
- MESSENGER NAC image of Alencar
- Feature type: Central-peak impact crater
- Location: Michelangelo quadrangle, Mercury
- Coordinates: 63.5°S 103.5°W
- Diameter: 120 km
- Eponym: José de Alencar

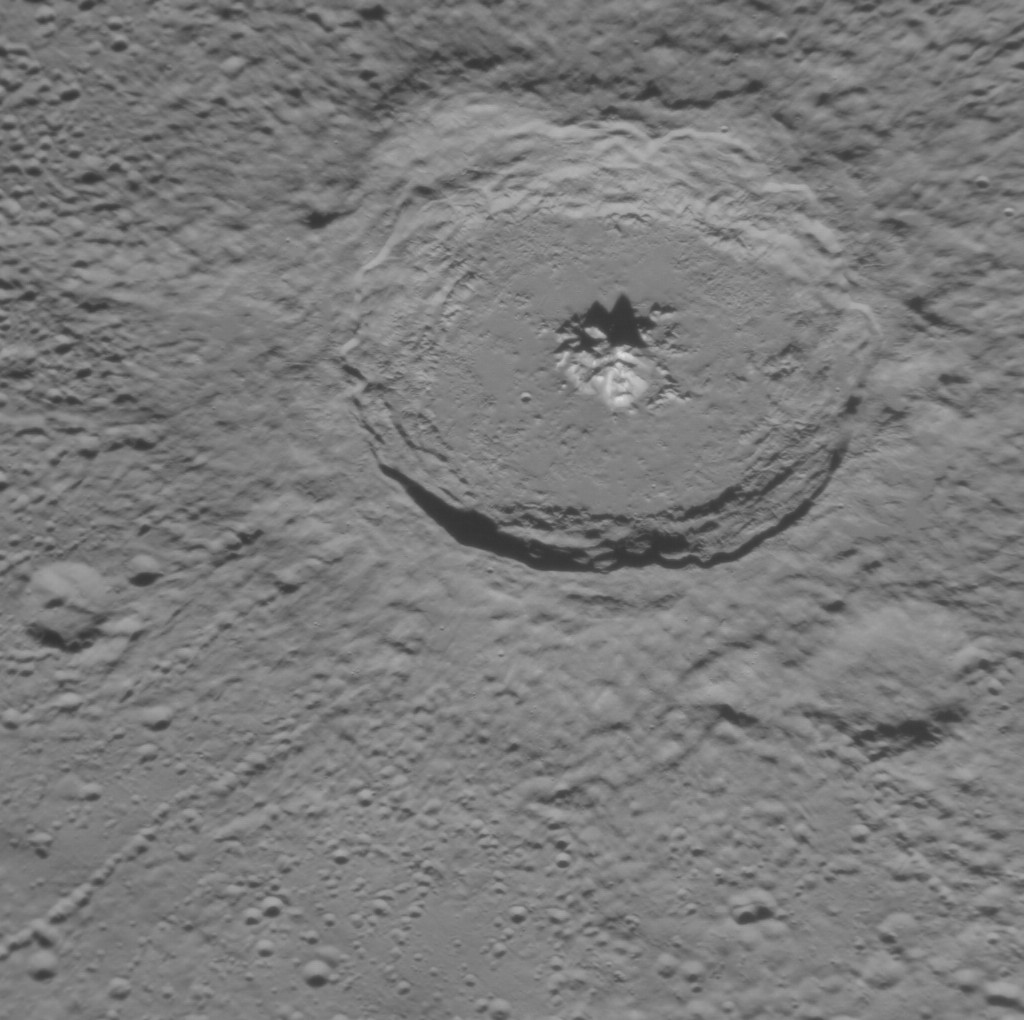
Oblique view of Alencar crater

Alencar is a crater on Mercury. It has a diameter of 120 kilometers. Its name was adopted by the International Astronomical Union (IAU) in 1979. Alencar is named for the Brazilian novel writer José de Alencar, who lived from 1829 to 1877. The crater was first imaged by Mariner 10 in 1974.

Alencar has a complex central peak. On the west side of the central peak complex is a dark spot of low reflectance material (LRM), closely associated with hollows.

Alencar is located to the north of the larger crater Bach.
