= Tamil Nadu Express =

Train in India

Tamil Nadu Superfast Express
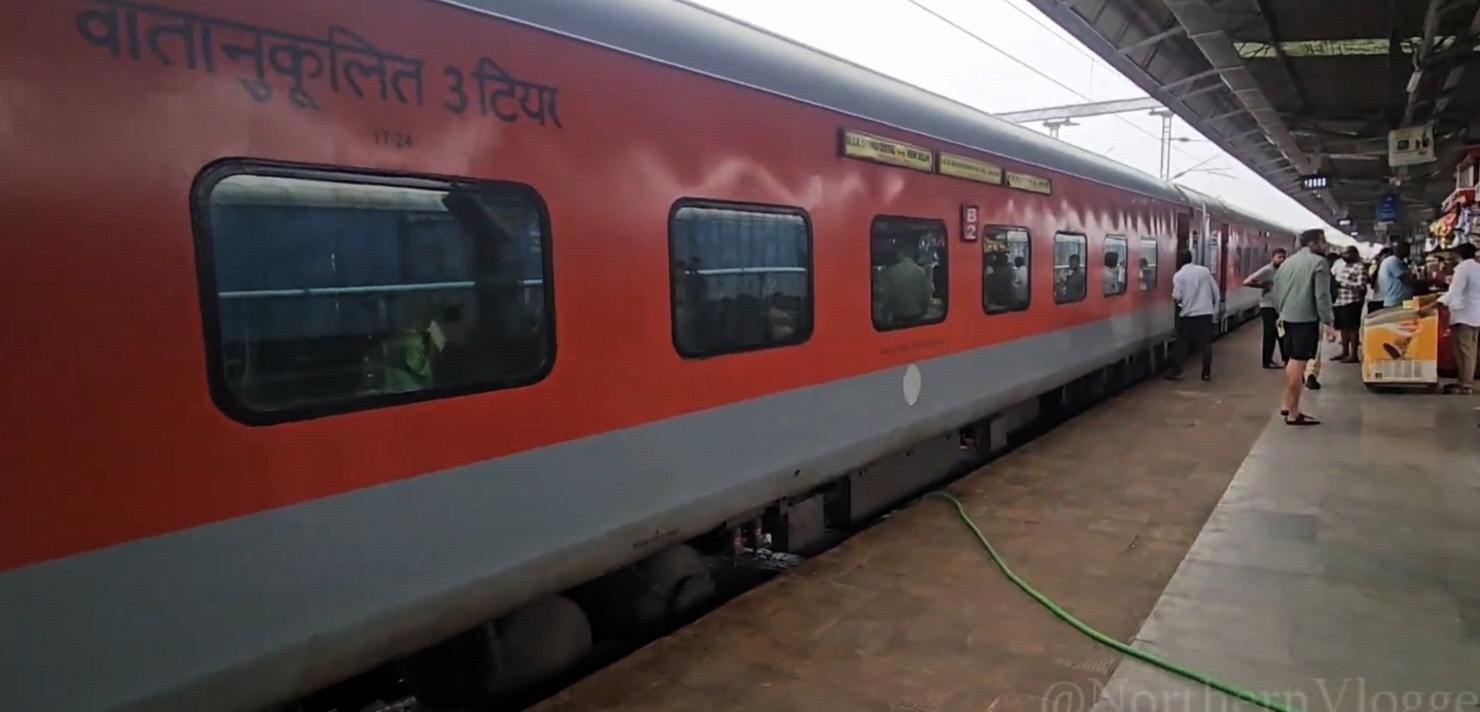
- Tamil Nadu Superfast Express At Itarsi Junction

Overview
- Service type: Superfast Express
- First service: 7 August 1976; 50 years ago
- Current operator: Southern Railway

Route
- Termini: MGR Chennai Central (MAS); New Delhi (NDLS)
- Stops: 10
- Distance travelled: 2,182 km (1,356 mi)
- Average journey time: 32 hours (Approx.)
- Service frequency: Daily
- Train number: 12621 / 12622

On-board services
- Classes: AC First Class, AC 2 Tier, AC 3 Tier, AC 3 Tier Economy, Sleeper Class, General Unreserved
- Seating arrangements: Yes
- Sleeping arrangements: Yes
- Catering facilities: Available
- Observation facilities: Large windows
- Baggage facilities: Available
- Other facilities: Below the seats

Technical
- Rolling stock: LHB coach
- Track gauge: Broad Gauge; 1,676 mm (5 ft 6 in)
- Operating speed: 70 km/h (43 mph) average including halts.
Route map
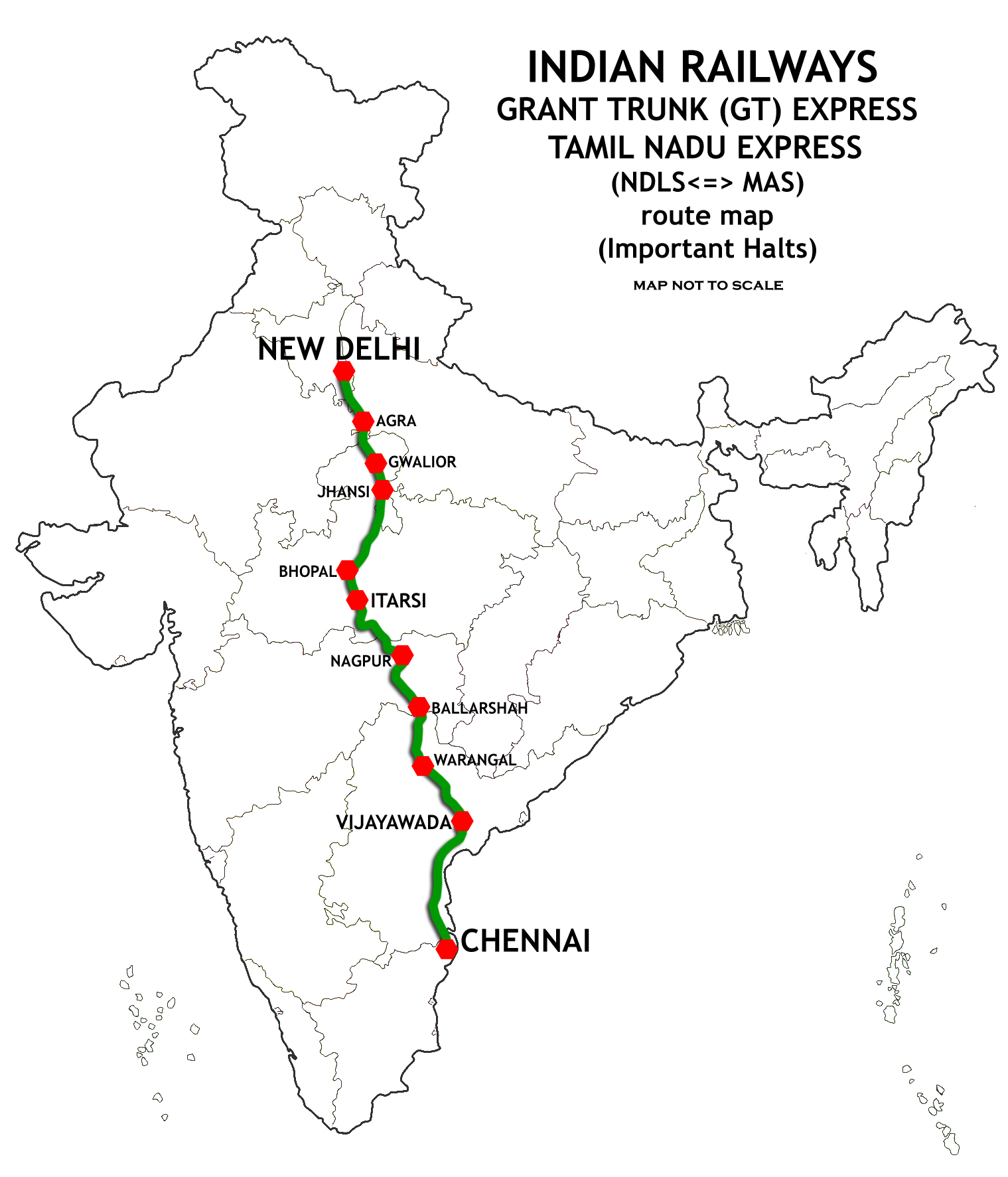
- Tamil Nadu Express route map

The 12621 / 12622 Tamil Nadu Express is a superfast express train of the Indian Railways connecting M.G. R Chennai Central - New Delhi . It is the fastest Non - AC train between New Delhi and Chennai covering the distance in 32 hours.

It only stops at Agra, Gwalior, Jhansi, Bhopal, Itarsi, Nagpur, Balharshah, Warangal, Khammam (since 09.10.2023) and Vijayawada.

It has the non-stop continuous run between Vijayawada and Chennai Central of 431 kilometres (268 mi).

earlier it was being hauled by WAP-4 with ICF rakes. Now It is hauled by a WAP-7 and so was WAP-4 from Royapuram shed end to end, since the whole route is electrified.

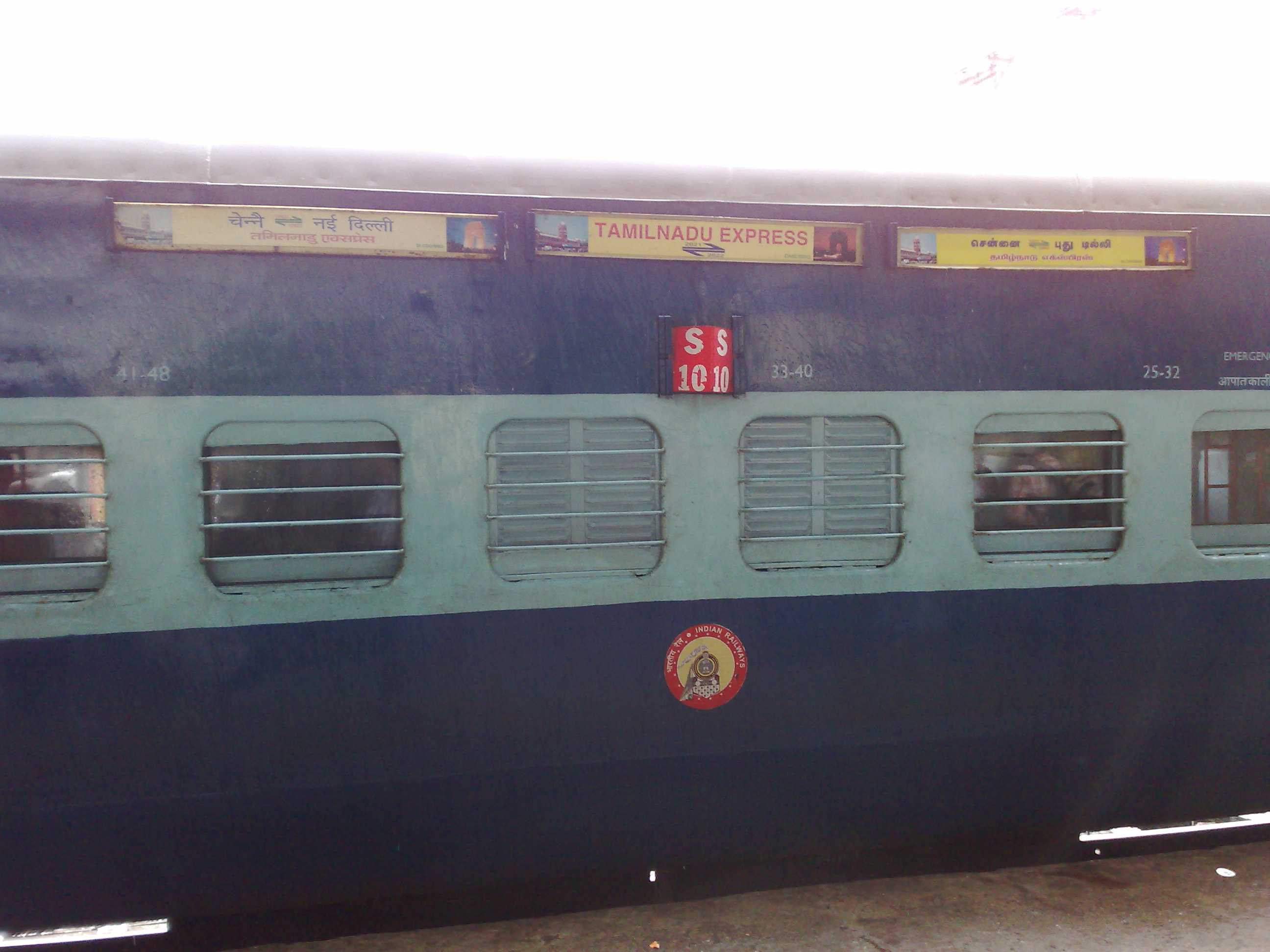
Tamil Nadu Express sleeper coach

== Accidents ==
Tamil Nadu Express has traditionally been accident-prone, with many accidents occurring due to its speed. The top speed of the train was reduced after series of derailments and after major derailment of 14 coaches on 31 August 1981 at Asifabad Road Station in Telangana, in which 15 persons were killed and 39 injured. The following table enlists the accidents that happened on Tamil Nadu Express.

List of Accidents on Tamil Nadu Express
Year	Location	Cause of Accident	Casualties
1977	Vijayawada	Derailment	none
1978	Nagpur-Itarsi section	Derailment	none
1981	Asifabad Road Station	Derailment	15 killed 39 injured
1983	Kazipet	Derailment	none
1984	Vijayawada	Derailment	none
1984	Delhi	Fire in one of the coaches	Two coaches partially damaged
1986	Agra-Gwalior Section	Fire in one of the first class coaches	3 injured
1987	Amla-Nagpur	Derailment of 13 coaches	2 killed 30 injured
1990	Mathura	Collision with an empty train	none
2012	Nellore	Fire in S11 coach	32 killed 27 injured

== See also ==
- Dedicated Intercity trains of India
- The Grand Trunk Express
- Chennai Duronto Express
- Chennai Rajdhani Express
- Kerala Express
- Karnataka Express
- Andhra Pradesh Express
