= Tiago Alencar =

Brazilian footballer

Personal information
- Full name: Tiago Alencar dos Santos
- Date of birth: 30 July 1986 (age 40)
- Place of birth: Curitiba, Brazil
- Height: 1.87 m (6 ft 1 1/2 in)
- Position: Centre-back

Team information
- Current team: Ipatinga

Youth career
- J. Malucelli
- 2005–2006: → Coritiba (loan)

Senior career*
| Years | Team | Apps | (Gls) |
| 2007–2009 | Corinthians Paranaense | 5 | (0) |
| 2009 | Vitória Guimarães | 0 | (0) |
| 2010 | Mirassol | 0 | (0) |
| 2010 | Paraná | 5 | (0) |
| 2011– | Corinthians Paranaense | 0 | (0) |
| 2012 | → Mogi Mirim (loan) | 0 | (0) |
| 2012– | → Ipatinga (loan) | 0 | (0) |
- * Club domestic league appearances and goals

Tiago Alencar dos Santos known as Tiago or Tiago Alencar (born 30 July 1986) is a Brazilian footballer who plays for Ipatinga on loan from Corinthians Paranaense.

== Biography ==
Born in Curitiba, Paraná, Tiago signed a contract with J. Malucelli in December 2004 but immediately loaned to Coritiba for 2-year.

He then returned to J. Malucelli and played for the team at 2007 Campeonato Paranaense and 2007 Copa Paraná, which the team won the latter and qualified to 2008 Campeonato Brasileiro Série C. At Série C, he played 5 games, and sent off in the 5th game. In 2009 season, he played once at 2009 Copa do Brasil and also played in the state league, which the team finished as the runner-up in the latter.

In August 2009 he was signed by Portuguese Primeira Liga club Vitória Guimarães. He failed to play any match and returned to Brazil for Mirassol until the end of 2010 Campeonato Paulista.

In July he was signed by Paraná until the end of 2010 Campeonato Brasileiro Série B.

He returned to Corinthians Paranaense (ex-J.Malucelli) in January 2011

In 2012, he was loaned to Mogi Mirim. On 30 May he was signed by Ipatinga FC.

== Honours ==
- Copa Paraná: 2007
