= Ateshkadeh =

Ateshkadeh or Atashkadeh (Persian: اتشكده) may refer to:

- Fire temple, a Zoroastrian place of worship.
- Ateshkadeh-ye Olya
- Ateshkadeh-ye Sofla
- William Atashkadeh - Swedish-Iranian footballer

== See also ==
- Atashgah (disambiguation)
