= Atashgah =

Atashgah or Ateshgah (Persian: آتشگاه) may refer to:

- Fire temple, a Zoroastrian worship place
- Atashgah, Alborz, a village in Iran
- Atashgah, Ardabil, a village in Iran
- Atashgah-e Jadid, a village in Ardabil Province, Iran
- Atashgah, Chaharmahal and Bakhtiari, a village in Iran
- Ateshgah, Gilan, a village in Iran
- Ateshgah-e Bozorg, a village in Kohgiluyeh and Boyer-Ahmad Province, Iran
- Atashgah of Isfahan, a tower-like construction located in Iran
- Ateshgah of Baku, also known as Fire Temple of Baku, is a museum now in Baku Azerbaijan
- Atashgah of Tbilisi, also known as Fire Temple of Tbilisi, is a museum now in Tbilisi Georgia
- Atashgah Castle, a castle in the city of Kashmar
- Atashgah Manmade-Cave, a Cave in the city of Kashmar

== See also ==
- Ateshkadeh (disambiguation)
