= Deh Morgh =

Deh Morgh ده مرغ
- Village
- Location within Iran
- Coordinates: 31°34′55″N 59°15′31″E
- Country: Iran
- Province: South Khorasan
- County: Nehbandan
- Bakhsh: Central
- Rural District: Meyghan

Population (2006)
  - Total: 55
- Time zone: UTC+3:30 (IRST)
  - Summer (DST): UTC+4:30 (IRDT)

Deh Morgh (Persian: ده مرغ, also Romanized as Deh-e Morgh and Deh Margh; also known as Deh Marg) is a village in Meyghan Rural District, in the Central District of Nehbandan County, South Khorasan Province, Iran. At the 2006 census, its population was 55, in 13 families.
