= Kalateh-ye Hoseyn Mohammad Qasem =

Kalateh-ye Hoseyn Mohammad Qasem كلاته حسين محمدقاسم
- Village
- Country: Iran
- Province: South Khorasan
- County: Nehbandan
- Bakhsh: Central
- Rural District: Meyghan

Population (2006)
  - Total: 14
- Time zone: UTC+3:30 (IRST)
  - Summer (DST): UTC+4:30 (IRDT)

Kalateh-ye Hoseyn Mohammad Qasem (Persian: كلاته حسين محمدقاسم, also Romanized as Kalāteh-ye Ḩoseyn Moḩammad Qāsem; also known as Kalāteh-ye Rostam) is a village in Meyghan Rural District, in the Central District of Nehbandan County, South Khorasan Province, Iran. At the 2006 census, its population was 14, in 4 families.
