= Golanjak =

Golanjak گلنجك
- Village
- Location within Iran
- Coordinates: 31°31′19″N 59°17′29″E
- Country: Iran
- Province: South Khorasan
- County: Nehbandan
- Bakhsh: Central
- Rural District: Meyghan

Population (2006)
  - Total: 21
- Time zone: UTC+3:30 (IRST)
  - Summer (DST): UTC+4:30 (IRDT)

Golanjak (Persian: گلنجك) is a village in Meyghan Rural District, in the Central District of Nehbandan County, South Khorasan Province, Iran. At the 2006 census, its population was 21, in 7 families.
