= Khunjuk Sukhteh =

Khunjuk Sukhteh خنجوك سوخته
- Village
- Country: Iran
- Province: South Khorasan
- County: Nehbandan
- Bakhsh: Central
- Rural District: Meyghan

Population (2006)
  - Total: 24
- Time zone: UTC+3:30 (IRST)
  - Summer (DST): UTC+4:30 (IRDT)

Khunjuk Sukhteh (Persian: خنجوك سوخته, also Romanized as Khunjūḵ Sūkhteh) is a village in Meyghan Rural District, in the Central District of Nehbandan County, South Khorasan Province, Iran. At the 2006 census, its population was 24, in 5 families.
