= Arviz =

Arviz (Persian: ارويز) may refer to:

- Arviz, Birjand
- Arviz, Nehbandan
