= Ali Rais =

Ali Rais علي رئيس
- Village
- Location within Iran
- Coordinates: 31°45′23″N 59°49′16″E
- Country: Iran
- Province: South Khorasan
- County: Nehbandan
- Bakhsh: Central
- Rural District: Neh

Population (2006)
  - Total: 431
- Time zone: UTC+3:30 (IRST)
  - Summer (DST): UTC+4:30 (IRDT)

Ali Rais (Persian: علي رئيس, also Romanized as ‘Alī Ra’īs) is a village in Neh Rural District, in the Central District of Nehbandan County, South Khorasan Province, Iran. At the 2006 census, its population was 431, in 110 families.
