= Kal-e Hoseyna =

Kal-e Hoseyna كال حسينا
- Village
- Country: Iran
- Province: South Khorasan
- County: Nehbandan
- Bakhsh: Central
- Rural District: Neh

Population (2006)
  - Total: 63
- Time zone: UTC+3:30 (IRST)
  - Summer (DST): UTC+4:30 (IRDT)

Kal-e Hoseyna (Persian: كال حسينا, also Romanized as Kāl-e Ḩoseynā) is a village in Neh Rural District, in the Central District of Nehbandan County, South Khorasan Province, Iran. At the 2006 census, its population was 63, in 16 families.
