= Bichand =

Village in South Khorasan province, Iran

Bichand Persian: بيچند
- Village
- Location within Iran
- Coordinates: 31°47′14″N 59°48′06″E
- Country: Iran
- Province: South Khorasan
- County: Nehbandan
- District: Central
- Rural District: Neh

Population (2016)
  - Total: 826
- Time zone: UTC+3:30 (IRST)

Bichand (Persian: بيچند) (Note: Also romanized as Biçand, and Bīchand; also known as Beshand, Beshnad, Biahand, Biehand, Bījend, and Bīūhand) is a village in Neh Rural District of the Central District in Nehbandan County, South Khorasan province, Iran.

== Demographics ==
=== Population ===
At the time of the 2006 National Census, the village's population was 1,297 in 290 households. The following census in 2011 counted 850 people in 266 households. The 2016 census measured the population of the village as 826 people in 247 households.
