= Banaji =

Banaji is a surname. Notable people with the surname include:

- Framji Cowasji Banaji (1767–1851), Indian merchant
- Mahzarin Banaji (born 1956), American psychologist
