= Heydarabad, Nehbandan =

Village in South Khorasan province, Iran

Heydarabad Persian: حيدراباد
- Village
- Location within Iran
- Coordinates: 31°01′39″N 60°05′17″E
- Country: Iran
- Province: South Khorasan
- County: Nehbandan
- District: Central
- Rural District: Neh

Population (2016)
  - Total: 351
- Time zone: UTC+3:30 (IRST)

Heydarabad (Persian: حيدراباد) (Note: Also romanized as Ḩeydarābād; also known as Haidarābād) is a village in Neh Rural District of the Central District in Nehbandan County, South Khorasan province, Iran.

== Demographics ==
=== Population ===
At the time of the 2006 National Census, the village's population was 418 in 87 households. The following census in 2011 counted 381 people in 83 households. The 2016 census measured the population of the village as 351 people in 89 households.
