= Rumeh =

Village in South Khorasan province, Iran

Rumeh Persian: رومه
- Village
- Location within Iran
- Coordinates: 31°54′12″N 59°24′58″E
- Country: Iran
- Province: South Khorasan
- County: Nehbandan
- District: Central
- Rural District: Meyghan

Population (2016)
  - Total: 187
- Time zone: UTC+3:30 (IRST)

Rumeh (Persian: رومه) (Note: Also romanized as Roomeh and Rūmeh; also known as Rameh) is a village in Meyghan Rural District of the Central District in Nehbandan County, South Khorasan province, Iran.

== Demographics ==
=== Population ===
At the time of the 2006 National Census, the village's population was 341 in 103 households. The following census in 2011 counted 318 people in 112 households. The 2016 census measured the population of the village as 187 people in 68 households.
