= Chah Dashi =

Village in South Khorasan province, Iran

Chah Dashi Persian: چاه داشي
- Village
- Location within Iran
- Coordinates: 31°29′02″N 59°41′21″E
- Country: Iran
- Province: South Khorasan
- County: Nehbandan
- District: Central
- Rural District: Neh

Population (2016)
  - Total: 2,473
- Time zone: UTC+3:30 (IRST)

Chah Dashi (Persian: چاه داشي) (Note: Also romanized as Chāh Dāshī) is a village in Neh Rural District of the Central District in Nehbandan County, South Khorasan province, Iran.

== Demographics ==
=== Population ===
At the time of the 2006 National Census, the village's population was 1,703 in 381 households. The following census in 2011 counted 2,509 people in 639 households. The 2016 census measured the population of the village as 2,473 people in 676 households. It was the most populous village in its rural district.
