= Miqan =

Miqan or Meyqan or Miyqan (Persian: ميقان) may refer to:

- Meyqan, Markazi
- Miqan, Semnan

== See also ==
- Meyghan
