= Asadabad, South Khorasan =

Village in South Khorasan province, Iran

Asadabad Persian: اسداباد
- Village
- Location within Iran
- Coordinates: 31°40′00″N 60°02′47″E
- Country: Iran
- Province: South Khorasan
- County: Nehbandan
- District: Central
- Rural District: Neh

Population (2016)
  - Total: 694
- Time zone: UTC+3:30 (IRST)

Asadabad (Persian: اسداباد) (Note: Also romanized as Asadābād; also known as Hasadābād) is a village in Neh Rural District of the Central District in Nehbandan County, South Khorasan province, Iran.

== Demographics ==
=== Population ===
At the time of the 2006 National Census, the village's population was 823 in 179 households. The following census in 2011 counted 906 people in 232 households. The 2016 census measured the population of the village as 694 people in 196 households.
