= Chahar Farsakh =

Village in South Khorasan province, Iran

Chahar Farsakh Persian: چهارفرسخ
- Village
- Location within Iran
- Coordinates: 31°41′45″N 59°50′21″E
- Country: Iran
- Province: South Khorasan
- County: Nehbandan
- District: Central
- Rural District: Neh

Population (2016)
  - Total: 580
- Time zone: UTC+3:30 (IRST)

Chahar Farsakh (Persian: چهارفرسخ) (Note: Also romanized as Chahār Farsakh and Chehār Farsakh; also known as Chahār Farsang and Chehār Farsang) is a village in Neh Rural District of the Central District in Nehbandan County, South Khorasan province, Iran.

== Demographics ==
=== Population ===
At the time of the 2006 National Census, the village's population was 656 in 178 households. The following census in 2011 counted 949 people in 267 households. The 2016 census measured the population of the village as 580 people in 187 households.
