= Deh Now, Nehbandan =

Village in South Khorasan province, Iran

Deh Now Persian: ده نو
- Village
- Location within Iran
- Coordinates: 31°50′56″N 59°21′17″E
- Country: Iran
- Province: South Khorasan
- County: Nehbandan
- District: Central
- Rural District: Meyghan

Population (2016)
  - Total: 167
- Time zone: UTC+3:30 (IRST)

Deh Now (Persian: ده نو) (Note: Also romanized as Deh-e Now; also known as Deh Nau) is a village in Meyghan Rural District of the Central District in Nehbandan County, South Khorasan province, Iran.

== Demographics ==
=== Population ===
At the time of the 2006 National Census, the village's population was 277 in 83 households. The following census in 2011 counted 243 people in 80 households. The 2016 census measured the population of the village as 167 people in 57 households.
