= Kalateh-ye Sorkh =

Village in South Khorasan province, Iran

Kalateh-ye Sorkh Persian: كلاته سرخ
- Village
- Location within Iran
- Country: Iran
- Province: South Khorasan
- County: Nehbandan
- District: Central
- Rural District: Meyghan

Population (2016)
  - Total: 99
- Time zone: UTC+3:30 (IRST)

Kalateh-ye Sorkh (Persian: كلاته سرخ) (Note: Also romanized as Kalāteh Sorkh and Kalateh-ye Sorkh; also known as Kalāteh-i-Surkh) is a village in Meyghan Rural District of the Central District in Nehbandan County, South Khorasan province, Iran.

== Demographics ==
=== Population ===
At the time of the 2006 National Census, the village's population was 86 in 23 households. The following census in 2011 counted 70 people in 22 households. The 2016 census measured the population of the village as 99 people in 32 households.
