= Khansharaf =

Village in South Khorasan province, Iran

Khansharaf Persian: خوان شرف
- Village
- Location within Iran
- Coordinates: 31°33′54″N 60°06′16″E
- Country: Iran
- Province: South Khorasan
- County: Nehbandan
- District: Central
- Rural District: Neh

Population (2016)
  - Total: 2,173
- Time zone: UTC+3:30 (IRST)

Khansharaf (Persian: خوان شرف) (Note: Also romanized as Khān Sharaf and Khvānsharaf; also known as Khāneh Sharīf, Khushara, Khūshāreh, and Khvoshāreh) is a village in, and the capital of, Neh Rural District in the Central District of Nehbandan County, South Khorasan province, Iran.

== Demographics ==
=== Population ===
At the time of the 2006 National Census, the village's population was 1,879 in 430 households. The following census in 2011 counted 2,548 people in 634 households. The 2016 census measured the population of the village as 2,173 people in 574 households.
