= Dehu, Meyghan =

Village in South Khorasan province, Iran

Dehu Persian: دهو
- Village
- Location within Iran
- Coordinates: 31°37′10″N 59°26′44″E
- Country: Iran
- Province: South Khorasan
- County: Nehbandan
- District: Central
- Rural District: Meyghan

Population (2016)
  - Total: 184
- Time zone: UTC+3:30 (IRST)

Dehu (Persian: دهو) (Note: Also romanized as Dehoo and Dehū; also known as Dahūr, Dehau, and Dehūr) is a village in Meyghan Rural District of the Central District in Nehbandan County, South Khorasan province, Iran.

== Demographics ==
=== Population ===
At the time of the 2006 National Census, the village's population was 147 in 36 households. The following census in 2011 counted a population below the reporting threshold. The 2016 census measured the population of the village as 184 people in 53 households.
