= Ateshkadeh-ye Sofla =

Ateshkadeh-ye Sofla اتشكده سفلي
- Village
- Location within Iran
- Coordinates: 31°38′15″N 59°28′27″E
- Country: Iran
- Province: South Khorasan
- County: Nehbandan
- Bakhsh: Central
- Rural District: Meyghan

Population (2006)
  - Total: 45
- Time zone: UTC+3:30 (IRST)
  - Summer (DST): UTC+4:30 (IRDT)

Ateshkadeh-ye Sofla (Persian: اتشكده سفلي, also Romanized as Āteshkadeh-ye Soflá; also known as Āteshkadeh-ye Pā’īn, Ātashkadeh and Āteshkadeh) is a village in Meyghan Rural District, in the Central District of Nehbandan County, South Khorasan Province, Iran. At the 2006 census, its population was 45, in 11 families.
