= Gownd =

Village in South Khorasan province, Iran

Gownd Persian: گوند
- Village
- Location within Iran
- Coordinates: 31°39′17″N 59°59′24″E
- Country: Iran
- Province: South Khorasan
- County: Nehbandan
- District: Central
- Rural District: Neh

Population (2016)
  - Total: 300
- Time zone: UTC+3:30 (IRST)

Gownd (Persian: گوند) (Note: Also known as Jownd) is a village in Neh Rural District of the Central District in Nehbandan County, South Khorasan province, Iran.

== Demographics ==
=== Population ===
At the time of the 2006 National Census, the village's population was 261 in 80 households. The following census in 2011 counted 549 people in 167 households. The 2016 census measured the population of the village as 300 people in 106 households.
