= Arviz, Nehbandan =

Arviz ارويز
- Village
- Location within Iran
- Coordinates: 31°41′42″N 60°02′38″E
- Country: Iran
- Province: South Khorasan
- County: Nehbandan
- Bakhsh: Central
- Rural District: Neh

Population (2006)
  - Total: 365
- Time zone: UTC+3:30 (IRST)
  - Summer (DST): UTC+4:30 (IRDT)

Arviz (Persian: ارويز, also Romanized as Ārvīz; also known as Ābrīz and Arbīz) is a village in Neh Rural District, in the Central District of Nehbandan County, South Khorasan Province, Iran. At the 2006 census, its population was 365, in 88 families.
