= Deh-e Salam =

Village in South Khorasan province, Iran

Deh-e Salam Persian: دهسلم
- Village
- Location within Iran
- Coordinates: 31°11′54″N 59°19′17″E
- Country: Iran
- Province: South Khorasan
- County: Nehbandan
- District: Central
- Rural District: Neh

Population (2016)
  - Total: 406
- Time zone: UTC+3:30 (IRST)

Deh-e Salam (Persian: دهسلم) is a village in Neh Rural District of the Central District in Nehbandan County, South Khorasan province, Iran.

== Demographics ==
=== Population ===
At the time of the 2006 National Census, the village's population was 370 in 88 households. The following census in 2011 counted 326 people in 99 households. The 2016 census measured the population of the village as 406 people in 111 households.
