= Kalateh-ye Ryisi =

Village in South Khorasan province, Iran

Kalateh-ye Ryisi Persian: كلاته رئيسي
- Village
- Location within Iran
- Coordinates: 31°39′06″N 59°22′35″E
- Country: Iran
- Province: South Khorasan
- County: Nehbandan
- District: Central
- Rural District: Meyghan

Population (2016)
  - Total: 76
- Time zone: UTC+3:30 (IRST)

Kalateh-ye Ryisi (Persian: كلاته رئيسي) (Note: Also romanized as Kalāteh-ye Ryīsī; also known as Kalāt-e Ra’īs, Kalāteh, Kalāteh Rāīs (كلاته رئيس), Kalāteh-ye Ra’īs, Ra’īs, and Re’īs Kalāteh) is a village in Meyghan Rural District of the Central District in Nehbandan County, South Khorasan province, Iran.

== Demographics ==
=== Population ===
At the time of the 2006 National Census, the village's population was 57 in 18 households. The following census in 2011 counted 59 people in 16 households. The 2016 census measured the population of the village as 76 people in 22 households.
