= Ateshkadeh-ye Olya =

Village in South Khorasan province, Iran

Ateshkadeh-ye Olya Persian: اتشكده عليا
- Village
- Location within Iran
- Country: Iran
- Province: South Khorasan
- County: Nehbandan
- District: Central
- Rural District: Meyghan

Population (2016)
  - Total: 94
- Time zone: UTC+3:30 (IRST)

Ateshkadeh-ye Olya (Persian: اتشكده عليا) (Note: Also romanized as Āteshkadeh-ye ‘Olyā; also known as Āteshkadeh-ye Bālā) is a village in Meyghan Rural District of the Central District in Nehbandan County, South Khorasan province, Iran.

== Demographics ==
=== Population ===
At the time of the 2006 National Census, the village's population was 77 in 18 households. The following census in 2011 counted 84 people in 25 households. The 2016 census measured the population of the village as 94 people in 27 households.
