= Nehbandan =

City in South Khorasan province, Iran

Nehbandan Persian: نهبندان
- City
- Location within Iran
- Coordinates: 31°32′28″N 60°02′23″E
- Country: Iran
- Province: South Khorasan
- County: Nehbandan
- District: Central

Population (2016)
  - Total: 18,304
- Time zone: UTC+3:30 (IRST)

Nehbandan (Persian: نهبندان) (Note: Also romanized as Nahbandan and Nehbandān; also known as Neh) is a city in the Central District of Nehbandan County, South Khorasan province, Iran, serving as capital of both the county and the district.

== Demographics ==
=== Population ===
At the time of the 2006 National Census, the city's population was 15,998 in 3,817 households. The following census in 2011 counted 18,827 people in 4,524 households. The 2016 census measured the population of the city as 18,304 people in 4,755 households.

== Geography ==
=== Topography ===
Nehbandan is at an altitude of 1196 meters above sea level, and the heights of the north of this city reach 2500 meters above sea level. The city is near the central desert of Iran.

=== Resources ===
Precious stones in mines along with agriculture is another reason for the importance of Nehbandan.

=== Climate ===
Nehbandan has a hot desert climate (BWh) in the Köppen climate classification. The city is generally hot and dry due to its proximity to the central desert of Iran.

Climate data for Nehbandan (1991–2020)
Month	Jan	Feb	Mar	Apr	May	Jun	Jul	Aug	Sep	Oct	Nov	Dec	Year
Record high °C (°F)	23.4 (74.1)	27.6 (81.7)	36.0 (96.8)	39.0 (102.2)	42.5 (108.5)	45.1 (113.2)	45.3 (113.5)	45.9 (114.6)	41.6 (106.9)	35.5 (95.9)	33.1 (91.6)	28.8 (83.8)	45.9 (114.6)
Mean daily maximum °C (°F)	13.2 (55.8)	16.2 (61.2)	21.6 (70.9)	28.3 (82.9)	34.1 (93.4)	37.8 (100.0)	38.7 (101.7)	37.3 (99.1)	34.3 (93.7)	29.0 (84.2)	21.3 (70.3)	15.8 (60.4)	27.3 (81.1)
Daily mean °C (°F)	6.6 (43.9)	9.5 (49.1)	14.8 (58.6)	21.2 (70.2)	26.9 (80.4)	30.9 (87.6)	32.2 (90.0)	30.4 (86.7)	26.3 (79.3)	20.5 (68.9)	13.5 (56.3)	8.4 (47.1)	20.1 (68.2)
Mean daily minimum °C (°F)	0.7 (33.3)	3.4 (38.1)	8.2 (46.8)	13.8 (56.8)	18.9 (66.0)	23.7 (74.7)	26.2 (79.2)	24.2 (75.6)	18.0 (64.4)	11.8 (53.2)	6.0 (42.8)	1.8 (35.2)	13.1 (55.6)
Record low °C (°F)	−12.4 (9.7)	−9.0 (15.8)	−4.4 (24.1)	1.0 (33.8)	7.2 (45.0)	15.4 (59.7)	18.8 (65.8)	13.6 (56.5)	7.0 (44.6)	2.6 (36.7)	−4.8 (23.4)	−8.8 (16.2)	−12.4 (9.7)
Average precipitation mm (inches)	25.3 (1.00)	26.8 (1.06)	33.0 (1.30)	12.2 (0.48)	2.8 (0.11)	0.4 (0.02)	0.2 (0.01)	0.1 (0.00)	0.2 (0.01)	1.8 (0.07)	4.7 (0.19)	12.9 (0.51)	120.4 (4.74)
Average precipitation days (≥ 1.0 mm)	3.7	3.5	4.3	1.9	0.8	0.1	0.1	0.0	0.1	0.5	1.2	1.8	18.0
Average relative humidity (%)	51	45	39	29	20	15	14	14	16	22	35	44	28.7
Average dew point °C (°F)	−8.0 (17.6)	−7.5 (18.5)	−5.6 (21.9)	−3.6 (25.5)	−3.4 (25.9)	−4.0 (24.8)	−3.5 (25.7)	−4.8 (23.4)	−7.0 (19.4)	−6.9 (19.6)	−7.1 (19.2)	−8.5 (16.7)	−5.8 (21.6)
Mean monthly sunshine hours	214	213	236	268	315	344	366	358	320	297	246	228	3,405
Source 1: NOAA
Source 2: Ogimet
