= Seth Cowasji Behramji Banaji Atash Behram =

Zoroastrian fire temple in Mumbai, India

Religion
- Affiliation: Zoroastrianism (Kadmi)
- Ecclesiastical or organisational status: Active
- Leadership: Trustees of the Banaji Atash Behram
- Year consecrated: 13 December 1845

Location
- Location: Thakurdwar, Charni Road, Mumbai, Maharashtra, India

The Seth Cowasji Behramji Banaji Atash Behram, also known as the Banaji Atash Behram or Cawasjee Byramjee Atash Behram, is a historic Zoroastrian fire temple (Atash Behram) in Mumbai, India. It houses one of the highest-ranking sacred fires in India's Zoroastrian tradition.

== History ==
Consecrated in 1845, it is one of eight Atash Behrams in India and serves the Parsi community from both Kadmi and Shahenshahi calendars. The temple was built by Framji Cowasji Banaji, a Parsi merchant and philanthropist in memory of his parents, Seth Cowasji Behramji Banaji (also spelled Cawasjee Byramjee Banaji) and Bai Jaiji. It was co-funded with his brothers Curshedji and Rustomji and his nephew Dadabhai. IThe Banaji family, originally from the Surat region funded the project with a reported expenditure of around Rs. 1.5 lakhs.

Elaborate consecration rituals, including one year of ''eejashne-vendidad'' ceremonies, were performed under the leadership of Dasturji Jamshedji Edulji Jamaspasa (Shahenshahi) and Dasturji Bejonji Rustamji (Kadmi). The first ''buoi'' (offering) was made by Vada Dasturji Bejonji Rustamji. The fire was consecrated on 13 December 1845 (Roz Sarosh, Mah Khordad/Teshtar Tir, 1215 A.Y.)

The temple completed its 175th year in 2019.

== See also ==
- List of fire temples in India
