= Meyghan =

Village in South Khorasan province, Iran

Meyghan Persian: ميغان
- Village
- Location within Iran
- Coordinates: 31°49′00″N 59°27′58″E
- Country: Iran
- Province: South Khorasan
- County: Nehbandan
- District: Central
- Rural District: Meyghan

Population (2016)
  - Total: 664
- Time zone: UTC+3:30 (IRST)

Meyghan (Persian: ميغان) (Note: Also romanized as Meyghān and Mīghān; also known as Maikhan, Maiqān, Maiqhān, and Meyqān) is a village in, and the capital of, Meyghan Rural District in the Central District of Nehbandan County, South Khorasan province, Iran.

== Demographics ==
=== Population ===
At the time of the 2006 National Census, the village's population was 609 in 157 households. The following census in 2011 counted 616 people in 177 households. The 2016 census measured the population of the village as 664 people in 182 households. It was the most populous village in its rural district.
