= Ateshgah-e Bozorg =

Ateshgah-e Bozorg اتشگاه بزرگ
- Village
- Location within Iran
- Coordinates: 30°58′40″N 50°22′16″E
- Country: Iran
- Province: Kohgiluyeh and Boyer-Ahmad
- County: Landeh
- Bakhsh: Central
- Rural District: Tayebi-ye Garmsiri-ye Shomali

Population (2006)
  - Total: 104
- Time zone: UTC+3:30 (IRST)
  - Summer (DST): UTC+4:30 (IRDT)

Ateshgah-e Bozorg (Persian: اتشگاه بزرگ, also Romanized as Āteshgāh-e Bozorg; also known as Ātashgāh-e Vosţá, Āteshgāh-e Vasaţ, and Āteshgāh Vasaţ) is a village in Tayebi-ye Garmsiri-ye Shomali Rural District, in the Central District of Landeh County, Kohgiluyeh and Boyer-Ahmad Province, Iran. At the 2006 census, its population was 104, in 20 families.
