= Arviz, Birjand =

Arviz ارويز
- Village
- Location within Iran
- Coordinates: 33°05′39″N 59°15′59″E
- Country: Iran
- Province: South Khorasan
- County: Birjand
- Bakhsh: Central
- Rural District: Alqurat

Population (2006)
  - Total: 41
- Time zone: UTC+3:30 (IRST)
  - Summer (DST): UTC+4:30 (IRDT)

Arviz (Persian: ارويز, also Romanized as Ārvīz) is a village in Alqurat Rural District, in the Central District of Birjand County, South Khorasan Province, Iran. At the 2006 census, its population was 41, in 25 families.
