= Framji Cowasji Banaji =

Indian cotton merchant (1767–1851)

Framji Cowasji Banaji, Esq. (3 April 1767 – 12 February 1851) was born in Bombay (now Mumbai) to a Parsi family. His father, Cowasji Byramji (1744-1834), was a merchant, trading in cotton and had trading links with China, England and various Indian cities. He was the lease holder of Poway estate (now Powai). During his lifetime he did much for the city and his country and its people for which a Framji Cawasji Institute (now Framji Cowasji Hall) was built after his death. Among his notable accomplishments:-

- First Justice of Peace of Bombay.
- First to introduce engineering contrivances in the matter of carrying water from one place to another by means of pipes.
- Sent native fruit Mango that was grown in his estate of Powai as a present to the Queen of the United Kingdom on 18 May 1838.
- He rebuilt a Tank at Dhobi Talao at his own expense. In recognition of this noble act, the well was henceforth known as The Framji Cowasji Tank.
- He funded building of the Tower of Silence at Chowpati hill (now Malabar Hill) in the memory of his beloved daughter Dinbai.
- He along with his brothers and nephew funded building of Banaji Atash Behram at Churney road (now Charni Road) in the memory of his parents Cowasji and Bai Jaiji in 1845.
- He was instrumental in the success of the Elphinstone College, Bombay (now Mumbai).
- He was also a benefactor of the student's Literary and Scientific Society (LSS) in India.

== Commemoration ==
Post his death The Education Board under the presidency of eminent educationist and Judge, Sir Erskine Perry, put below resolution before the committee and passed:

Framji Cowasji, Esq. decided to step down from his position because he was getting older. After he resigned Framji Cowasji, Esq. passed away. When the Board heard about the death of Framji Cowasji, Esq. they took a moment to think about all the things he had done for the community. They remembered that Framji Cowasji, Esq. always tried to help make things better for everyone. The Board wanted to show respect, for the work of Framji Cowasji, Esq.. The memories people had of him.

ON the evening of 22 September 1852, The Framjee Cowasji Testimonial gathering was called to discuss a suitable memorial to erect in his name. P LeGreyt who was chairing the testimonial, termed it an "extraordinary occasion" and said:

“This is the first instance that has been known in which persons of the classes and denominations, of both natives and Europeans, have come forward to raise posthumous testimonial in honour of a native of this presidency”.

In 1862, Foundation stone was laid in his honour by Honorable Juggonnath Sunkersett to build Framji Cawasji Institute (now Framji Cowasji Hall).

In 1892, Memoirs of the late Framji Cowasji Banaji were published by Bombay Gazette Steam Printing Works. It was written by his great-grandson Khoshru Navrosji Banaji.
