= Fire Temple of Isfahan =

Sasanian era archaeological complex in Iran

Coordinates: 32°38′53″N 51°34′13″E

Fire Temple of Isfahan آتشگاه اسپهان
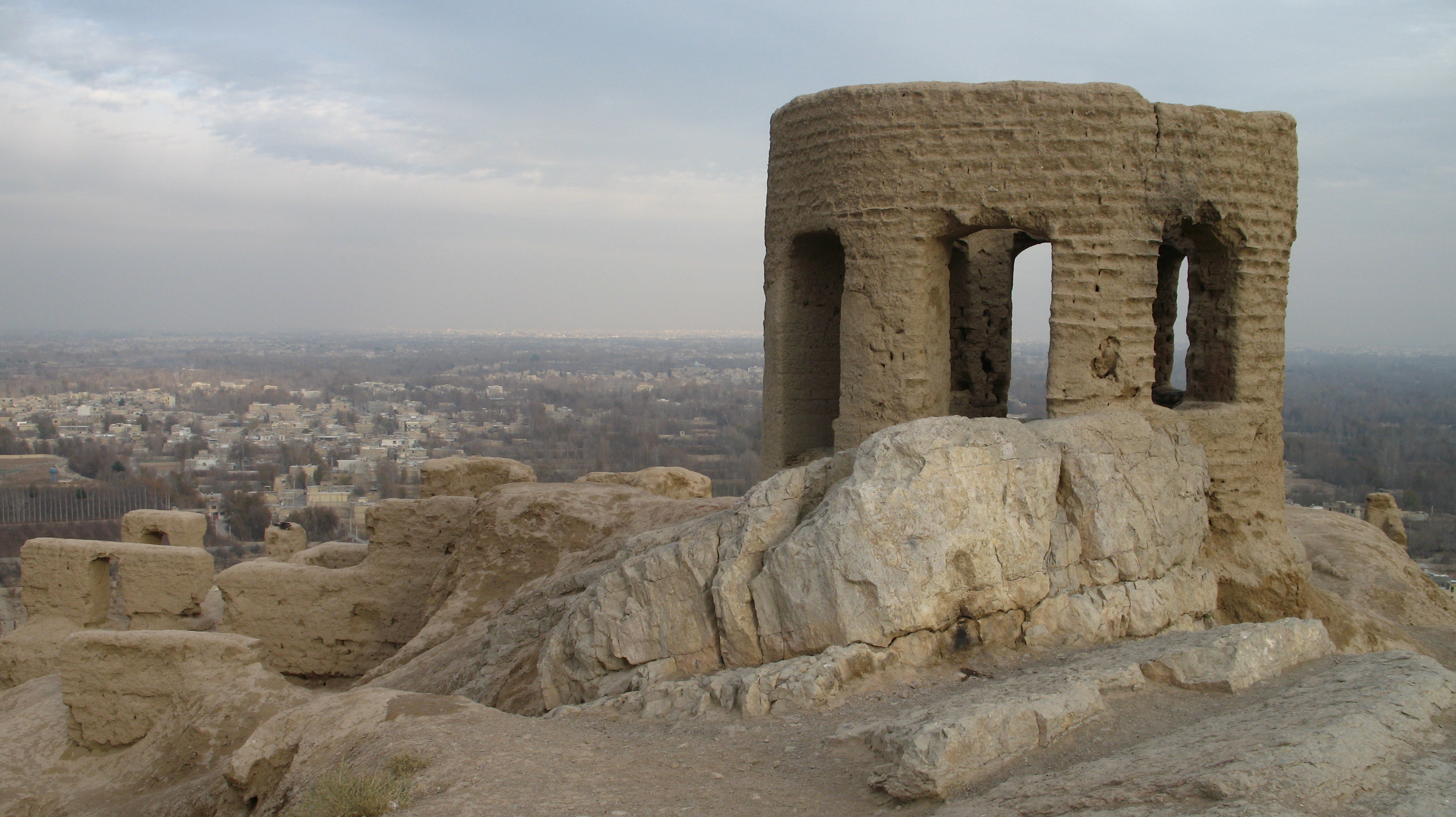
- Picture of the fire temple in 2007

Religion
- Affiliation: Zoroastrianism
- Province: Isfahan province
- Region: Iran

Location
- Location: Isfahan, Iran
- Municipality: Isfahan
- State: Isfahan, Iran
- Interactive map of Fire Temple of Isfahan آتشگاه اسپهان
- Territory: Iran

Architecture
- Style: Sasanian style
- Materials: Stone
- Designated as NHL

Iran National Heritage List
- Official name: Fire Temple of Isfahan
- Type: Fire Temple
- Designated: 1949
- Reference no.: 380
- Conservation organization: Cultural Heritage, Handicrafts and Tourism Organization of Iran

The Fire Temple of Isfahan (Persian: آتشگاه اسپهان, romanized: Âtašgâh-e Esfahân or Ātashgāh-e Esfahān) is a Sasanian era archaeological complex located on a hill of the same name about 8 kilometers west of the city center of Isfahan, Iran.

The hill, which rises about 210 meters above the surrounding plain, was previously called Maras or Marabin after a village near there, and it is by that name that the site is referred to by Arab historians.

== Description ==
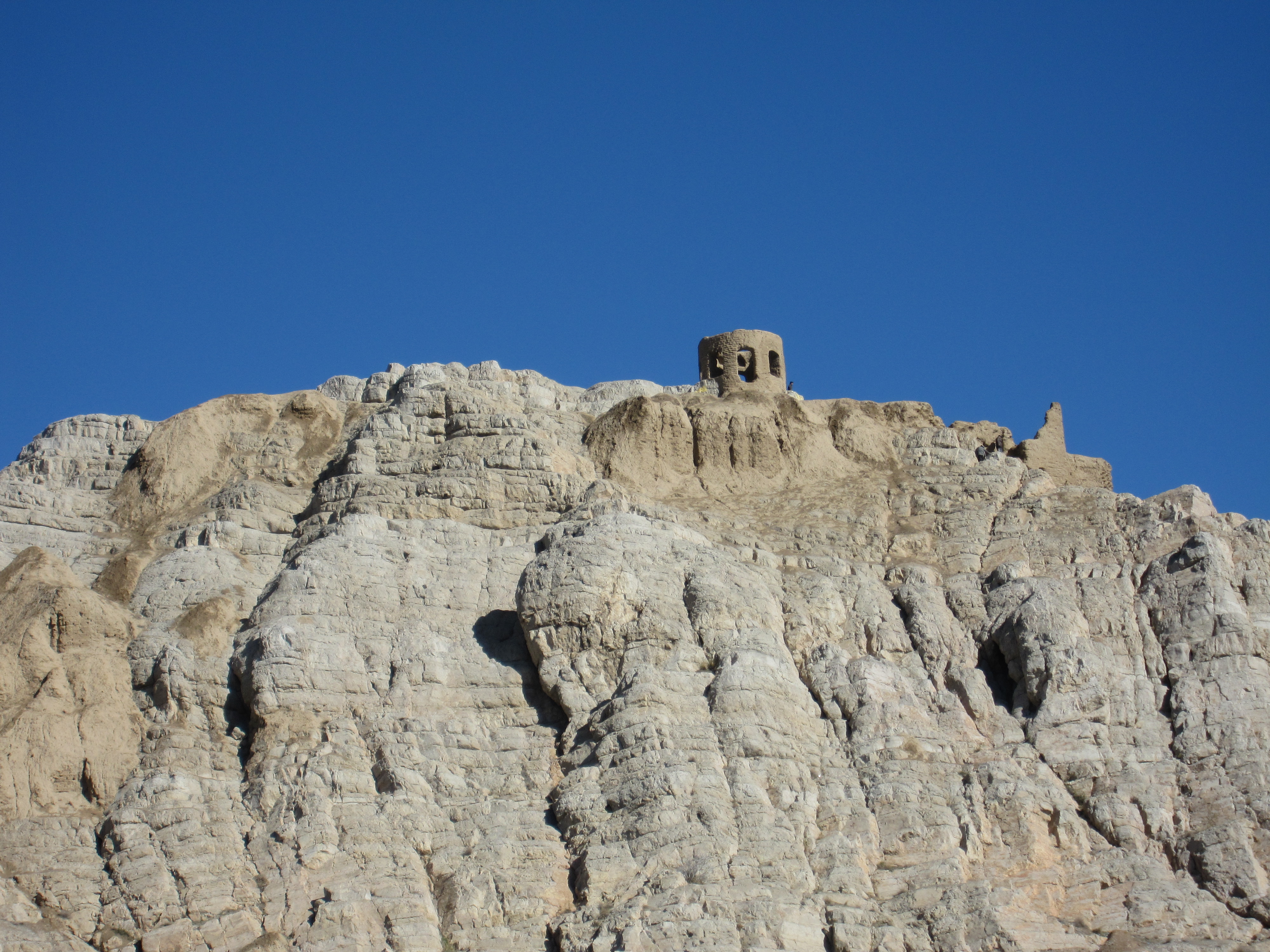
A view of the fire temple structure on the top of the hill

One part of the complex, on the southern flank of the hill, are the remains of a citadel of about twenty buildings (or rooms within buildings), many of which—particularly those in the lower half of cluster—are however only evident as foundation traces. Several buildings in the cluster have a classic chahartaq "four arch" floor-plan, characteristic of Zoroastrian fire-temples of the 3rd century onwards and that are the actual atashgahs that housed sacred fires. Other buildings include what may have been storage rooms and living quarters for priests and affluent pilgrims. A tentative identification of the purpose of the ruins was first made in 1937 by Andre Godard, but it was not until 1960, when architect Maxine Siroux made the first drawings, that the site could be properly studied. Godard's identifications were subsequently confirmed by Klaus Schippman in 1971.

Another feature of the complex are the remains of a tower-like circular building on the very top of the same hill. This structure, which was once at least twenty meters high, is known by the local populace as the Burj-i Gurban, or Burj-i Kurban, "Tower of Sacrifice", and appears to have been a military watch-tower with a flare that could be lit to warn of an approaching enemy (i.e. a beacon).

In both cases, the remaining walls are of baked brick, held together with a clay-reed mixture. In the 10th century, the buildings were used by the Esmā'ili inhabitants of Isfahan to hide from tax collectors. The Arab historian Masudi visited the site around the same time, and recorded local tradition as having believed that the site was converted from one of idol worship to one of fire by "King Yustasf (i.e. Vishtaspa, the patron of Zoroaster) when he adopted the religion of the Magi."

== Reviews ==
Andre Godard in 1938, in one of the volumes of "Iranian works" which was dedicated to fire buildings, gives a short but principled and accurate account about the Isfahan fire temple. Then, in the early 1960s, Maxime Siroux carried out detailed surveys of the fire temple. It was the first time someone attempted to make accurate architectural plans of the temple. Shortly afterwards, Klaus Shipmann studied the fire temple closely and published his report in a book, in German language, on Iranian fire buildings.

Alireza Jafari Zand published his collection of reports and studies on "Isfahan before Islam" in the form of a book of the same name in 2002. In this book, the religious use of the temple is emphasized and based on the results of years of carbon 14 experiments, this fire temple is considered an Elamite temple that later becomes a Mehri temple.

Mitra Azad "by completing the report of Mubad Shah Mardan in mentioning the fire temples of Iran, and using the studies of" Dietrich Hoff "on the typology of the four Sasanian Persians and also the studies of" Sheep Man "in the process of transformation and development of fire temples. The idea of having a circular plan is comparable to a building called "Chahak Fire Station" in Qom province.

== Location ==
Isfahan Fire Palace is located in the west of Isfahan, 8 km from the city center on Atashgah Street. This building is located on a mountain near the river Zayanderud. From the height of this hill, up to kilometers on all four main sides can be seen well.

== Current situation ==
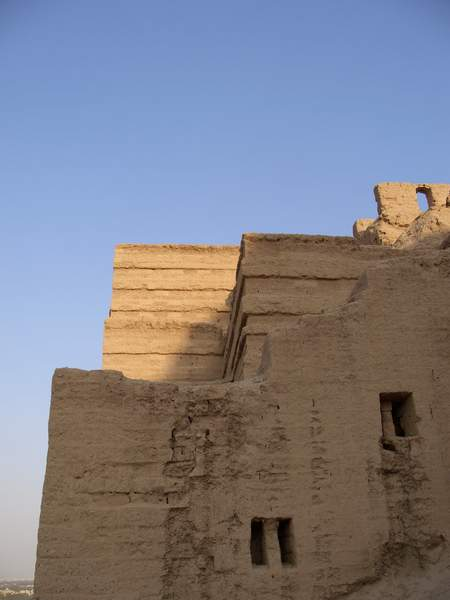
A view of the north side

Today, no attention is paid to the maintenance of this collection. Inside different parts of the temple, you can see many holes that have been dug by the treasure finders. There is not a suitable paved way and visitors have to choose their own way to climb, which due to the clay structure of the hill, the speed of destruction by visitors increases - especially on rainy days.

== Publications on the structure ==
In 2002, archaeologist Alireza Jafari Zand published a report on pre-Islamic Isfahan in which he emphasizes the religious role of the complex, and with reference to radiocarbon dating suggests that the construction was Elamite (pre-6th century). A doctoral thesis suggests a "similarity" between the tower and an edifice in Qom known as the Chahak fire temple; the similarity being that the building in Qom has a cylindrical structure at the top while the tower in Isfahan is based on a circular plan.

== Gallery ==
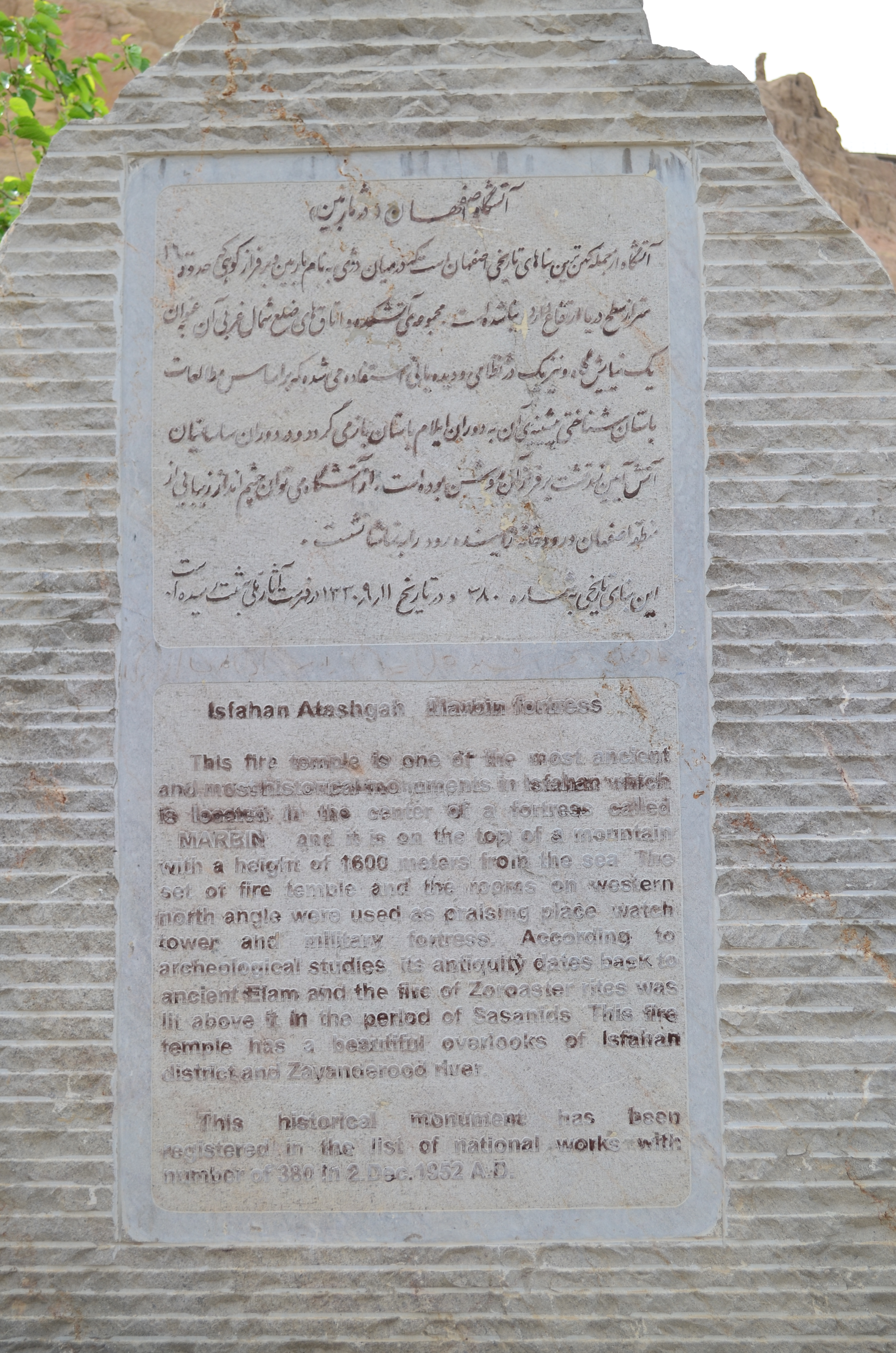

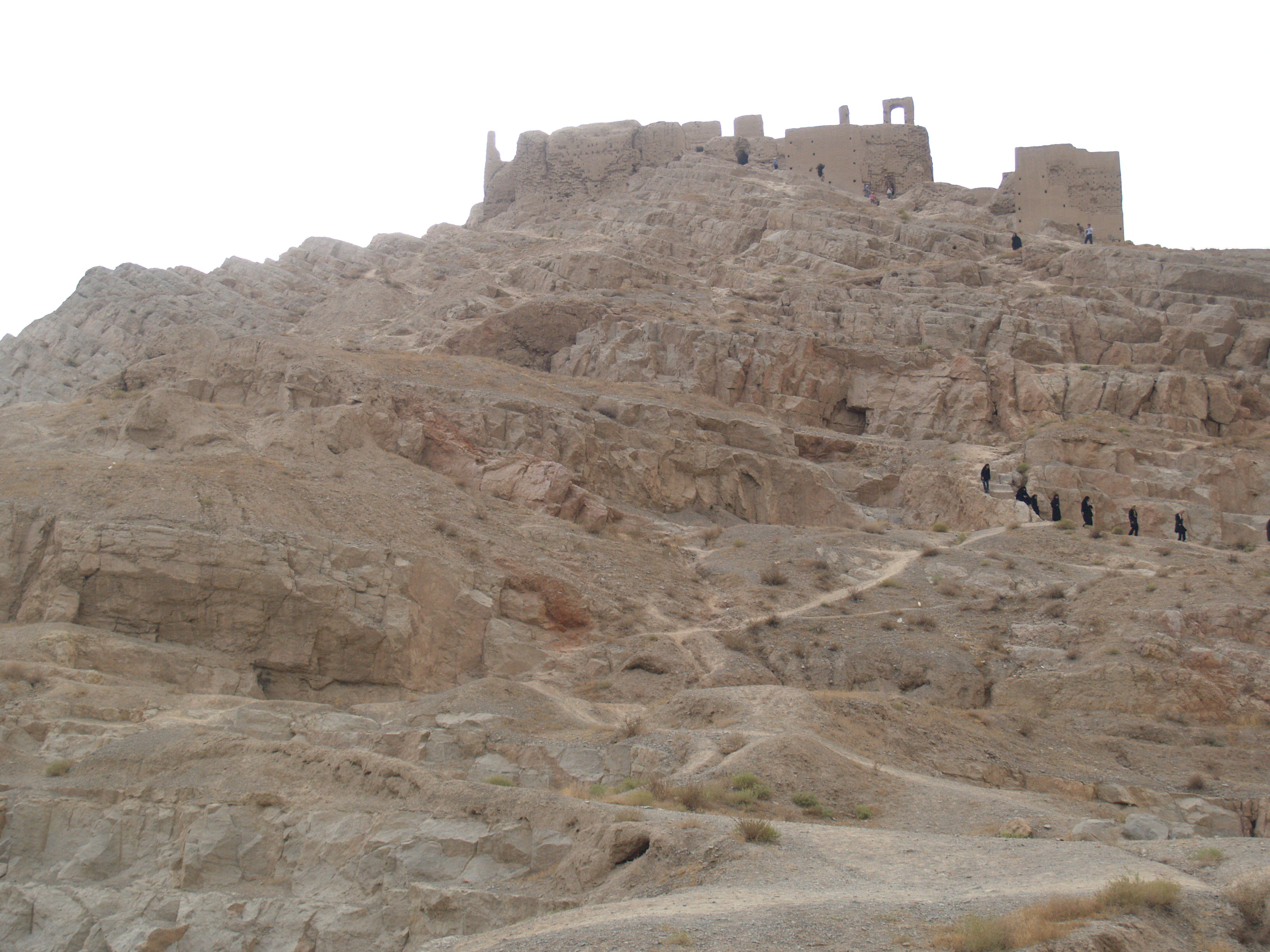

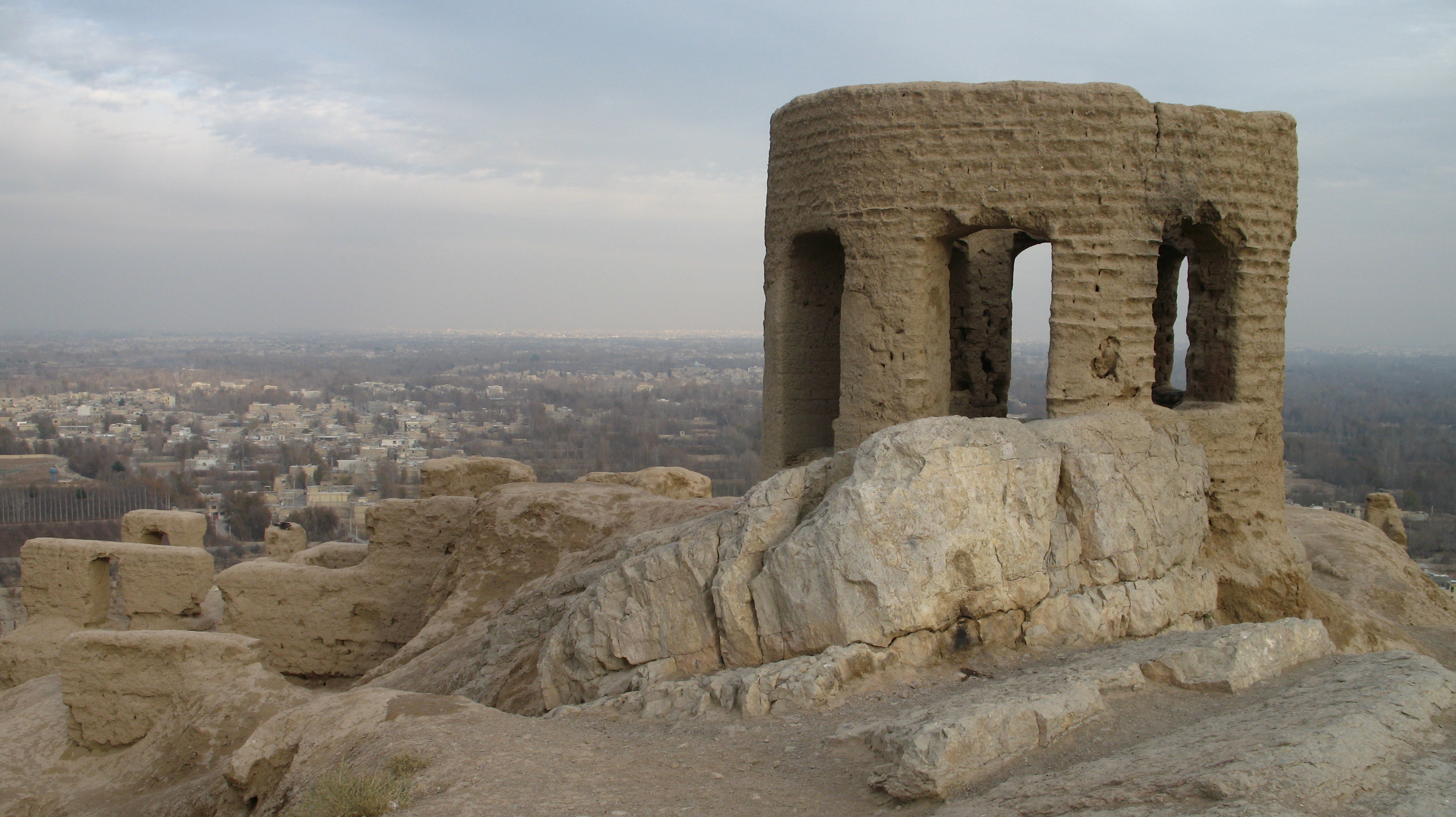

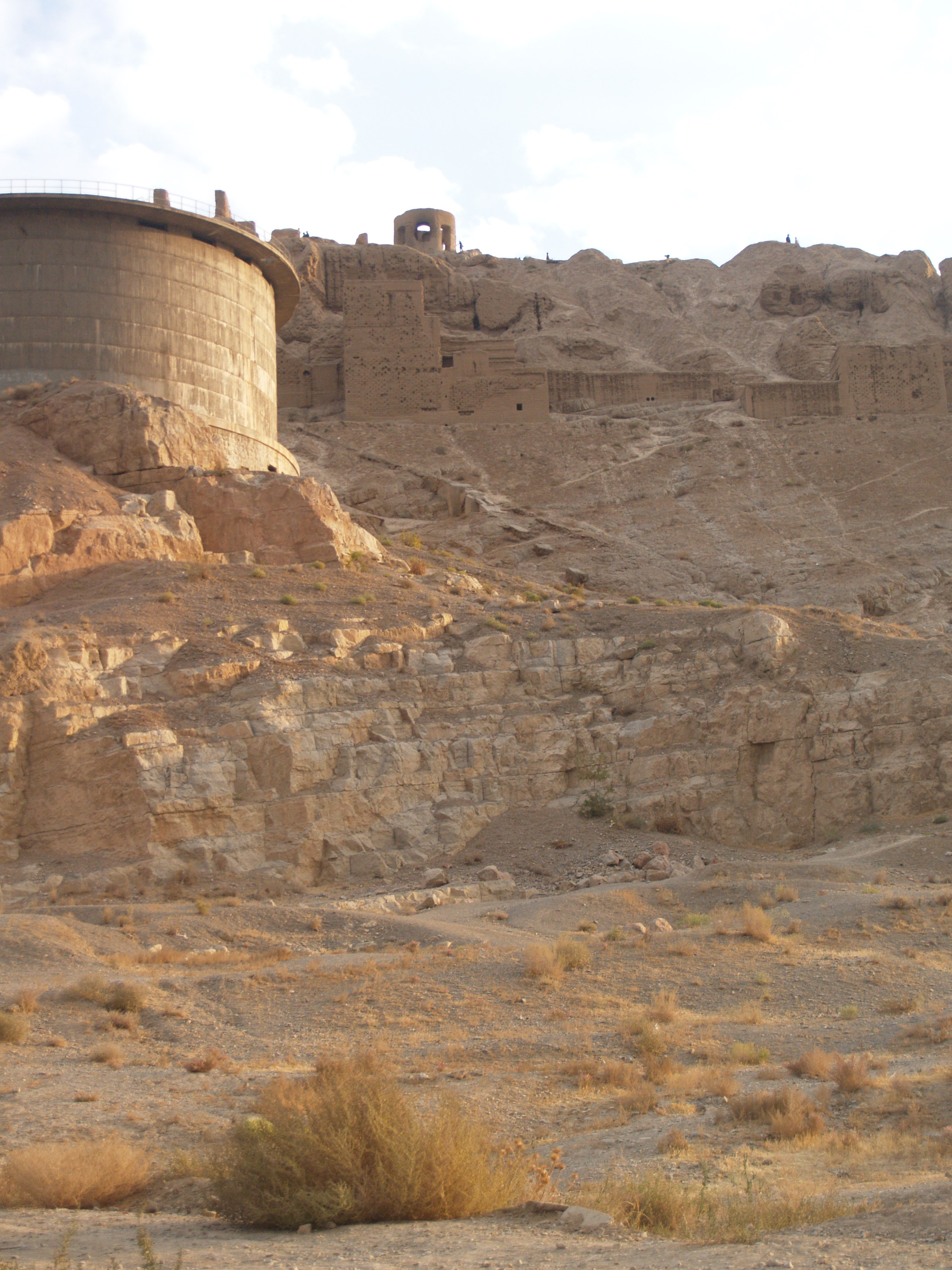

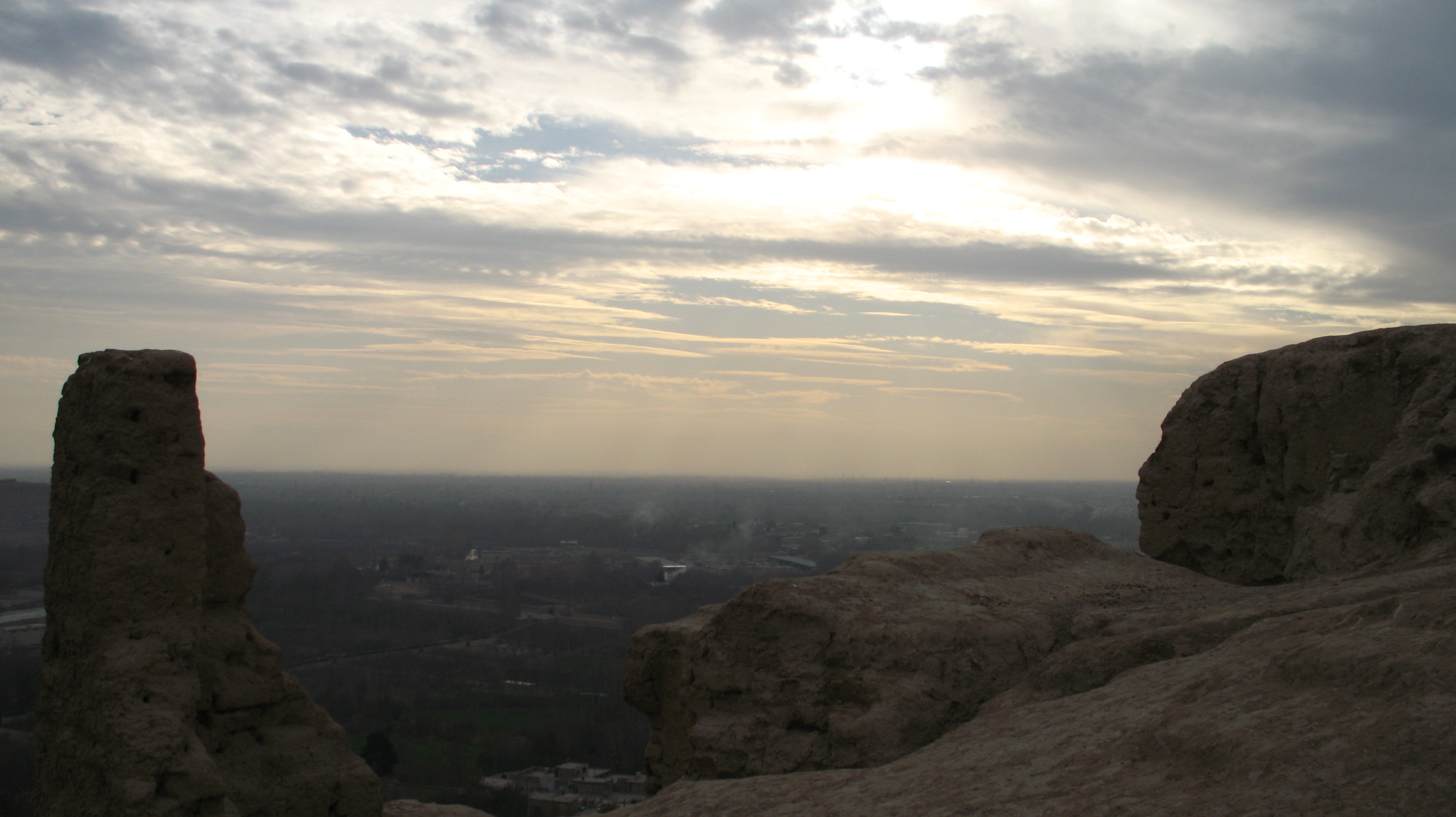

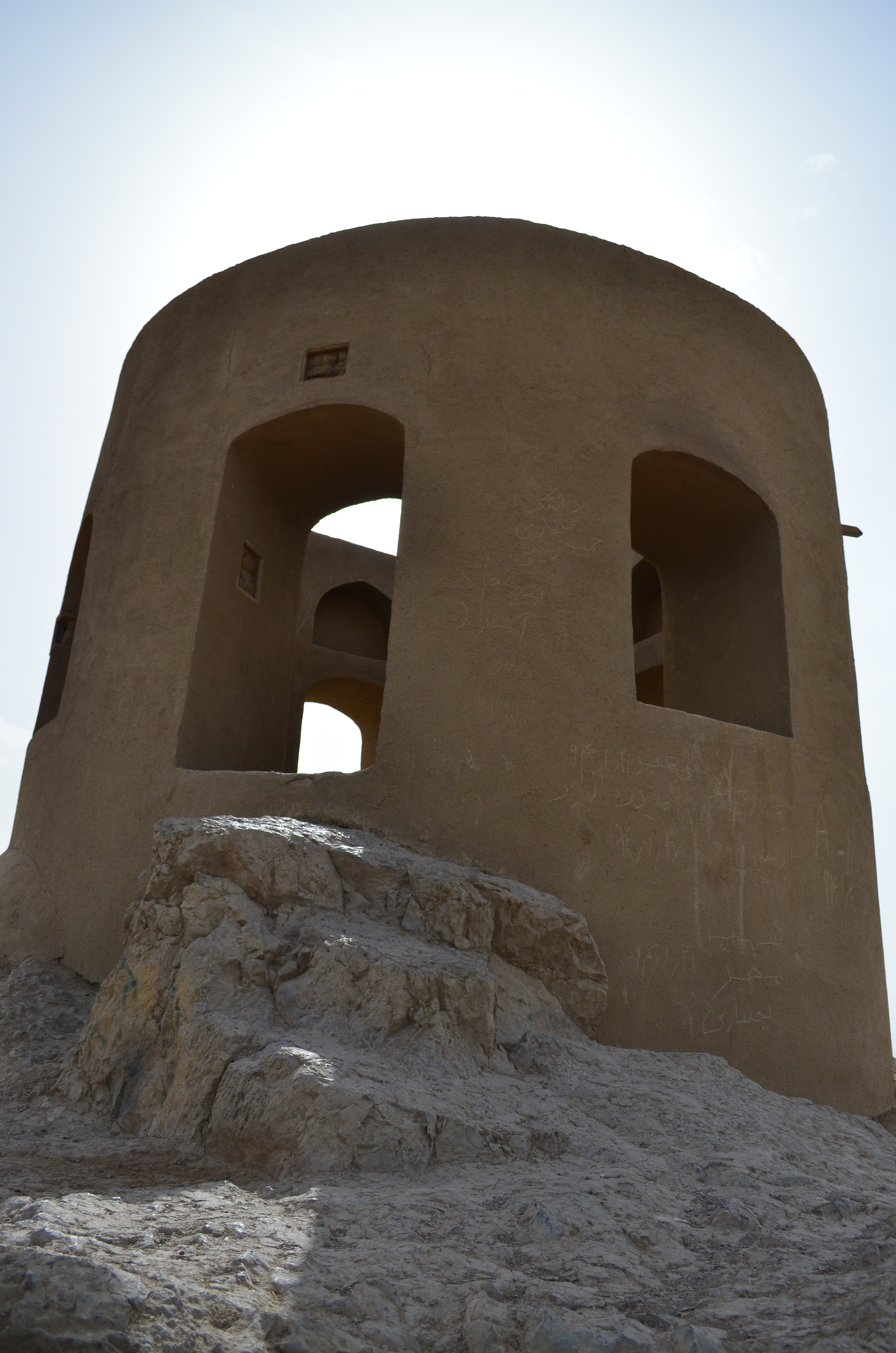

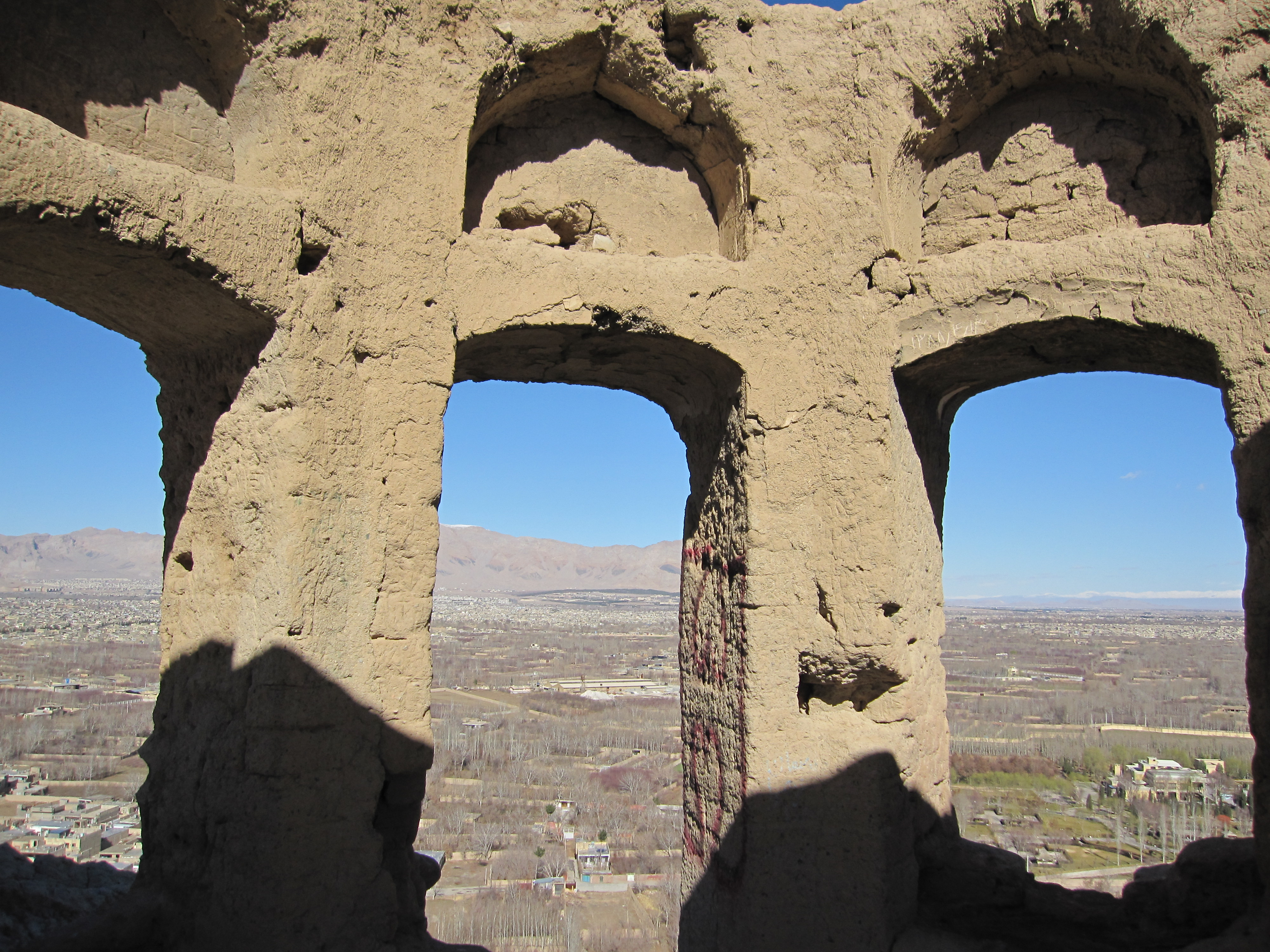

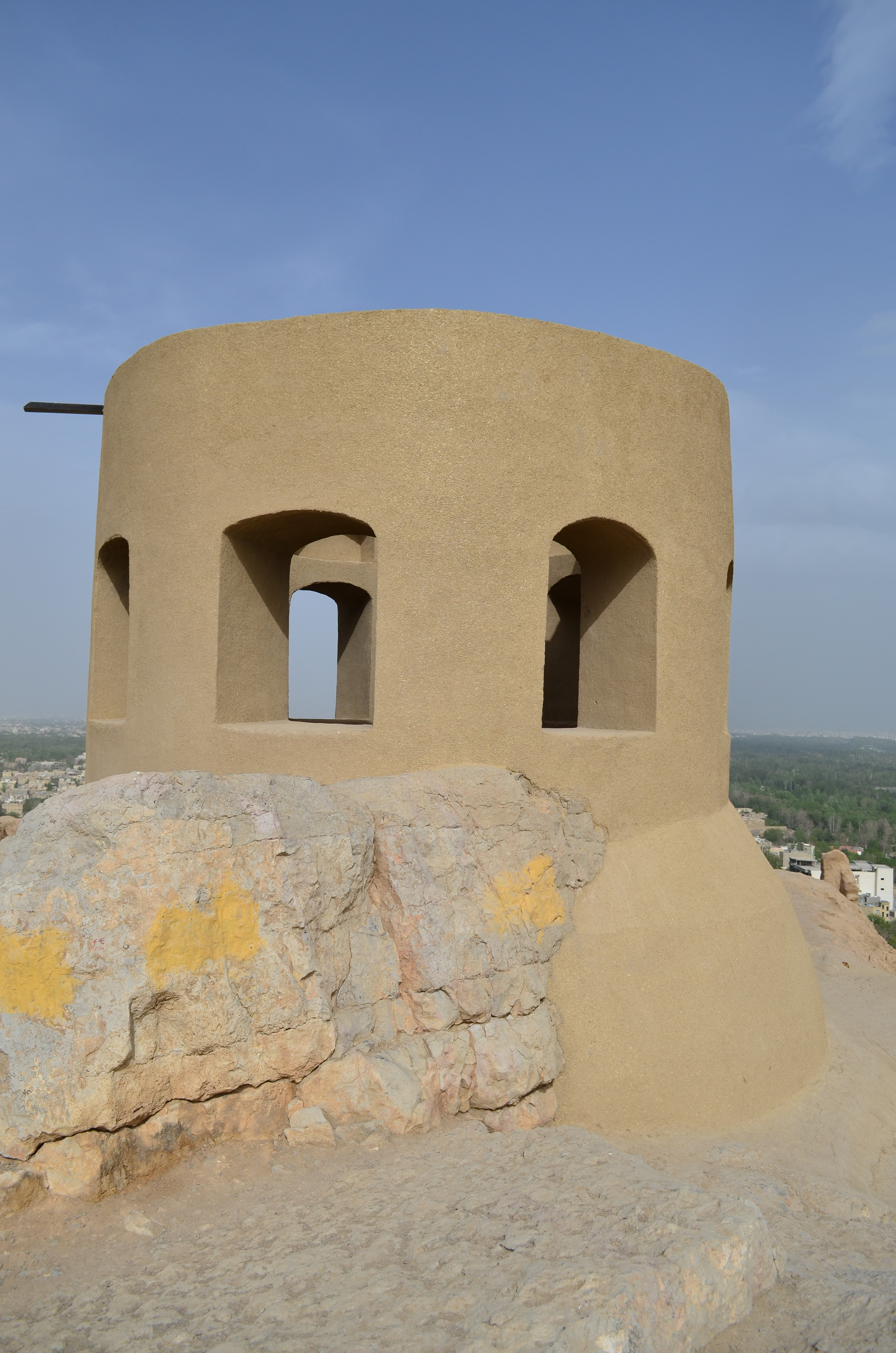

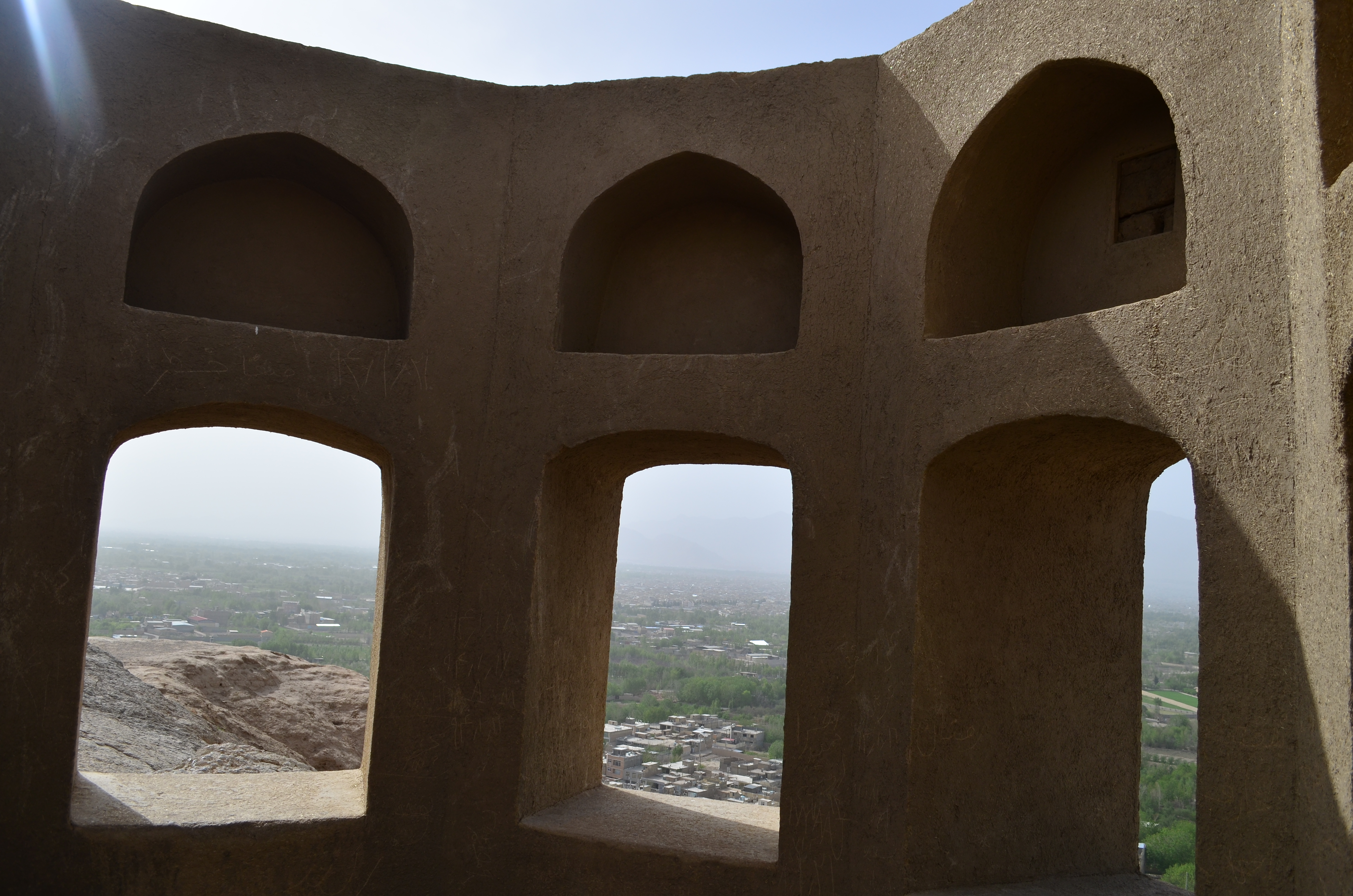

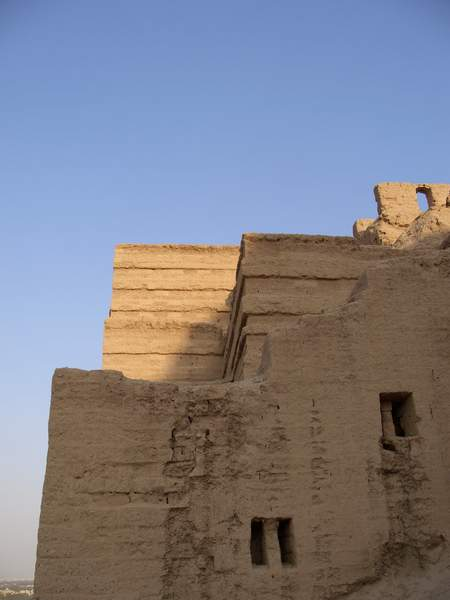

== Pictures ==
- Soltani, Abbas (2005), The tower-like structure on the hill, iranian.com
- Kazemi, Yaghesh (2004), Southern flank of Atashgah hill, pardis.150m.com, archived from the original on 2011-07-07
- More Photos in Tishineh
