= Neh Rural District =

Rural district in South Khorasan province, Iran

Neh Rural District Persian: دهستان نه
- Rural District
- Location within Iran
- Coordinates: 31°13′N 59°51′E
- Country: Iran
- Province: South Khorasan
- County: Nehbandan
- District: Central
- Established: 1987
- Capital: Khansharaf

Population (2016)
  - Total: 10,356
- Time zone: UTC+3:30 (IRST)

Neh Rural District (Persian: دهستان نه) is in the Central District of Nehbandan County, South Khorasan province, Iran. Its capital is the village of Khansharaf.

== Demographics ==
=== Population ===
At the time of the 2006 National Census, the rural district's population was 11,478 in 2,769 households. There were 12,433 inhabitants in 3,377 households at the following census of 2011. The 2016 census measured the population of the rural district as 10,356 in 2,988 households. The most populous of its 128 villages was Chah Dashi, with 2,473 people.

=== Other villages in the rural district ===
- Asadabad
- Bichand
- Chahar Farsakh
- Deh-e Salam
- Gownd
- Heydarabad
