= Meyghan Rural District =

Rural district in South Khorasan province, Iran

Meyghan Rural District Persian: دهستان ميغان
- Rural District
- Location within Iran
- Coordinates: 31°27′N 59°13′E
- Country: Iran
- Province: South Khorasan
- County: Nehbandan
- District: Central
- Established: 1987
- Capital: Meyghan

Population (2016)
  - Total: 3,614
- Time zone: UTC+3:30 (IRST)

Meyghan Rural District (Persian: دهستان ميغان) is in the Central District of Nehbandan County, South Khorasan province, Iran. Its capital is the village of Meyghan.

== Demographics ==
=== Population ===
At the time of the 2006 National Census, the rural district's population was 4,936 in 1,306 households. There were 4,026 inhabitants in 1,192 households at the following census of 2011. The 2016 census measured the population of the rural district as 3,614 in 1,091 households. The most populous of its 97 villages was Meyghan, with 664 people.

=== Other villages in the rural district ===
- Ateshkadeh-ye Olya
- Deh Now
- Dehu
- Kalateh-ye Ryisi
- Kalateh-ye Sorkh
- Rumeh
