= Central District (Nehbandan County) =

District in South Khorasan province, Iran

Central District (Nehbandan County) Persian: بخش مرکزی شهرستان نهبندان
- District
- Location within Iran
- Coordinates: 31°14′N 59°43′E
- Country: Iran
- Province: South Khorasan
- County: Nehbandan
- Capital: Nehbandan

Population (2016)
  - Total: 39,010
- Time zone: UTC+3:30 (IRST)

The Central District of Nehbandan County (Persian: بخش مرکزی شهرستان نهبندان) is in South Khorasan province, Iran. Its capital is the city of Nehbandan.

== Demographics ==
=== Population ===
At the time of the 2006 National Census, the district's population was 41,906 in 9,772 households. The following census in 2011 counted 42,979 people in 10,870 households. The 2016 census measured the population of the district as 39,010 inhabitants in 10,459 households.

=== Administrative divisions ===
Central District (Nehbandan County) Population
Administrative Divisions	2006	2011	2016
Bandan RD	9,494	7,693	6,736
Meyghan RD	4,936	4,026	3,614
Neh RD	11,478	12,433	10,356
Nehbandan (city)	15,998	18,827	18,304
Total	41,906	42,979	39,010
RD = Rural District
