= Battle of Sanjan =

Battle in Gujarat, India

Date	1465/1490 (disputed)
Location	Sanjan, Gujarat 20°12′4″N 72°48′4″E
Result	Gujarat Sultanate victory
Territorial changes	Sanjan sacked by Gujarat Sultanate

Belligerents
Gujarat Sultanate	Rana of Sanjan; Parsis of Sanjan

Commanders and leaders
Alp Khan	Ardeshir †

Strength
30,000 cavalry	1400 cavalry

Casualties and losses
Heavy	Heavy
- Location within Gujarat Battle of Sanjan (India)

The Battle of Sanjan was a decisive conflict between allied Parsi-Hindu forces and the Gujarat Sultanate's army under Alp Khan at Sanjan in 1465 or 1490 AD. (Note: Although date is disputed it is mostly believed to be either 1465 or 1490 while 1507 is considered largely inaccurate.: 1465; 1490 AD; 1507) Documented in the Qissa-i Sanjan, the battle took place centuries after Parsi refugees were granted asylum in Gujarat by King Jadi Rana. Despite an initial successful defense, the allied forces were completely defeated. Both the local Hindu Raja and the Parsi commander Ardeshir were killed. Following the town's sack the surviving Parsis fled to Bahrot hills.

== Background ==
Following the fall of Persia's Sassanian Empire under the last Emperor Yezdegard III, Zoroastrian (Parsi) refugees fled Arab religious persecution and sought asylum in India. Upon arrival, the local Hindu ruler, Jadi Rana, welcomed the exiles and granted them permission for conditional settlements in his territory. They first stayed at the port of Diu for 19 years before migrating to Sanjan, Gujarat. The Parsi colony of Sanjan bears the name of their ancient town of Sanjan, Khorasan.

== Battle ==
Mahmud Begada learned of a Hindu Raja ruling near Sanjan and decided to conquer the territory. He ordered his general Alp Khan to march with an army and capture the land. Alp Khan quickly assembled a force of 30,000 chosen horsemen, each with two mounts, and advanced to the town of Sanjan. When the Raja received news of the approaching army, he was terrified and sought help from the Zoroastrian priests of the Parsi community. He reminded them that his ancestors had long protected and patronized their people and asked them to fight in his service as repayment. The leading Mobed assured the Raja that the Parsis would not abandon him and would fight to the death without retreating. In response, 1,400 Parsis mobilized and joined the Raja’s forces. The combined Hindu and Parsi army then fought Alp Khan’s troops in battle. The fighting lasted three days with very heavy casualties on both sides. At one point the Hindu troops broke and fled the field, leaving the Parsis to continue fighting on their own. Ardeshir took a leading role of commander. He attacked into the enemy ranks with his comrades. Despite being heavily outnumbered, the Parsis repulsed Alp Khan’s army. Alp Khan fled during the night, abandoning his baggage and losing his way. Ardeshir captured the enemy’s tents, baggage, and other possessions.

The battle continued the next morning. Alp Khan had received a large number of fresh reinforcements. Ardeshir went to the Raja and pointed out that they were heavily outnumbered saying they would either fight or die. He then prepared himself and charged into the Gujarati lines. He challenged the sultanate's warriors. One such champion came forward and the two fought in single combat. Ardeshir defeated him then dragged him off his horse with the lasso and beheaded him. When Alp Khan saw his champion killed, he became furious and ordered his troops to slaughter all the Parsis and the Raja’s men. The fighting continued. Ardeshir was struck by an arrow that passed right through his body. He fell from his horse and died from the wounds. His death caused disorder and panic among his men. The Raja was also killed during the battle. Many soldiers and leaders died on both sides. In the end, Alp Khan’s forces won.

== Aftermath ==
The town of Sanjan was sacked by the Gujarati army. After losing many lives in battle, the Parsis of Sanjan fled with their sacred Zoroastrian fire (Atar) named Iranshah to the Bahrot hill. After few years they migrated to Bansda and finally Navsari.

== See also ==
- Battle of Variav
- Qissa-i Sanjan
- Jadi Rana

== Bibliography ==
- Commissariat, M. S. (1938). A History of Gujarat. Vol. I. Ahmadabad: Longmans Green & Co. Ltd.
- Hodivala, Shahpurshah Hormasji (2016) [1920]. Studies in Parsi History. Creative Media Partners, LLC. ISBN 978-1-372-07329-8.
- Paymaster, Rustom Burjorji (1954). Early History of the Parsees in India from Their Landing in Sanjan to 1700 A.D. Zartoshti Dharam Sambandhi Kelavni Apnari Ane Dnyan Felavnari Mandli.
- Dosabhai, Edalji (1986) [1894]. A History of Gujarat (PDF). Kessinger Publishing. ISBN 978-1-4367-3303-8.
- Modi, Jivanji Jamshedji (2004) [1905]. A Few Events in the Early History of the Parsis and Their Dates. K.R. Cama Oriental Institute.
- Unvala, J. M. (1947). "Political and Cultural Relations Between Iran and India". Annals of the Bhandarkar Oriental Research Institute. 28 (3/4): 165–189. ISSN 0378-1143.
