= Persecution of Zoroastrians =

The persecution of Zoroastrians is a significant aspect of the later part of the community's history. It is speculated that religious strife existed between Zoroastrians and early Christians, particularly within the context of the Roman–Persian Wars, though the extent of this phenomenon remains unclear. While it was a widespread religion in West Asia for over a millennium, Zoroastrianism began to decline drastically in the aftermath of the Muslim conquest of Persia. The conquest of the Sasanian Empire by the Rashidun Caliphate marked a monumental shift for the former's Zoroastrian-majority society, which was eventually subsumed by the ensuing process of Islamization. During this period, discrimination and harassment against Zoroastrians typically took place in the form of forced conversions and sparse violence. Early Muslims who arrived in the region are recorded to have destroyed Zoroastrian temples or repurposed them as mosques. Zoroastrian practices gradually became circumscribed under Islamic law, which included the levying of the jizya, a tax on non-Muslims.

Early Muslim behaviour with Zoroastrians may have been motivated in part by the fact that they are not explicitly classified as "People of the Book" in the Quran. Although some interpretations do extend this status to the community, the wider consensus among Muslim scholars is that "People of the Book" only identifies the followers of pre-Islamic Abrahamic religions—chiefly Judaism and Christianity—and consequently excludes Zoroastrianism, which is classified as an Iranian religion. Thus, the relative lack of amnesty and privileges for Zoroastrians at this time prompted a large part of the community to flee from Persia to neighbouring India, where they were granted asylum by local kings. The descendants of these Zoroastrian refugees of the early Muslim conquests are known as the Parsi people, who comprise the most prominent community of Indian Zoroastrians today.

Amidst the waves of exoduses, numerous Zoroastrians stayed in Persia and converted to Islam, primarily to integrate and gain full social status under the reign of the caliphates. For approximately 200 years after the collapse of the Sasanian Empire, Persia was ruled by Arab Muslims, but the impact of Arabization was ultimately not as widespread as the rest of West Asia due to Persian not being an Afroastiaic language, and the Iranian Intermezzo, which marked the resurgence of both Iranian self-governance and the Persian language, albeit with an Arabic script. Nevertheless, conditions failed to improve for the community, which continued to intermittently experience persecution as a religious minority under successive Muslim dynasties, such as the Safavids and the Qajars.

Beyond India, the global Zoroastrian population is largely concentrated in Iran, the Kurdistan Region of Iraq, and North America. In modern Iran, the religion was held in particularly high esteem under the Pahlavi dynasty, which sought to assert pre-Islamic Iranian nationalism throughout the country. Since the Islamic Revolution in 1979, it remains formally recognized by the Iranian government, which has allocated one seat in the Islamic Consultative Assembly for the Iranian Zoroastrian community.

== Persecution of Zoroastrians by Christians ==
=== in the Byzantine Empire ===
While the presence of a Zoroastrian community in the Byzantine Empire is not widely known, historical records such as those by the Roman historian Priscus in 456 indicate their existence. Priscus noted that a Sassanid ambassador condemned the harassment of Zoroastrians and attempts to force them to abandon their faith and sacred fire rituals. During conflicts between the Sassanids and the Byzantines, stipulations were sometimes made that Zoroastrians should not be persecuted; however, the very existence of such conditions implies the presence of Zoroastrians within the Byzantine realm.

During Emperor Heraclius's war against the Sassanids, the Adur Gushnasp fire temple was looted, demolished, and burned, and everyone inside was killed.

According to Mary Boyce, Zoroastrians living under Christian rule in Asia Minor were noted to have undergone hardship, notably during the long conflict between the Roman Empire and Persia. Christians living in Sassanian-held territory were noted to have destroyed many fire-temples and Zoroastrian places of worship. Christian priests deliberately extinguished the sacred fire of the Zoroastrians and characterized adherents as "followers of the wicked Zardusht (Zoroaster), serving false gods and the natural elements."

=== Zoroastrianism in Armenia ===
Zoroastrianism was the official religion of the Armenians prior to the adoption of Christianity. War subsequently broke out between the Sassanids and the Armenians. During the conflict, Mushegh I Mamikonian demolished Zoroastrian temples and burned Zoroastrians alive; the Sassanids, in turn, flayed Armenians and hung their skins on walls Following the execution of Mehruzhan Artsruni, a spear—heated until it turned red was driven into his head.

== Persecution by Muslims ==
=== Arab conquest of Persia ===
Until the Arab invasion and subsequent Muslim conquest, in the mid-7th century Persia (modern-day Iran) was a politically independent state, spanning from Mesopotamia to the Hindu Kush and dominated by a Zoroastrian majority. Zoroastrianism was the official state religion of four pre-Islamic Persian empires, the last being the Sassanian empire that passed a decree solidifying this in 224 CE. The Arab invasion abruptly brought to an end the religious domination of Zoroastrianism in Persia and instituted Islam as the official religion of the state.

Yemen's Zoroastrians who had the jizya imposed on them after being conquered by Muhammad are mentioned by the Islamic historian al-Baladhuri.

After the Muslim conquest of Persia, Zoroastrians were given dhimmi status and subjected to persecutions; discrimination and harassment began in the form of regular physical violence. Those paying Jizya were subjected to insults and humiliation by the tax collectors. Zoroastrians who were captured as slaves in wars were given their freedom if they converted to Islam.

Many fire temples, with their four axial arch openings, were usually turned into mosques simply by setting a mihrab (prayer niche) on the place of the arch nearest to qibla (the direction of Mecca). Zoroastrian temples converted into mosques in such a manner could be found in Bukhara, as well as in and near Istakhr and other Persian cities. Urban areas where Arab governors made their quarters were most vulnerable to such religious persecution, great fire temples were turned into mosques, and the citizens were forced to conform or flee. Many libraries were burnt and much cultural heritage was lost.

Gradually there were increased number of laws regulating Zoroastrian behavior, limiting their ability to participate in society, and making their life difficult in the hope that they would convert to Islam. Over time, persecution of Zoroastrians became more common and widespread, and the number of believers decreased significantly. Many converted, some superficially, to escape the systematic abuse and discrimination by the law of the land. According to Thomas Walker Arnold, Muslim missionaries did not encounter difficulty in explaining Islamic tenets to Zoroastrians, as there were many similarities between the faiths. According to Arnold, for the Persian, he would meet Ahura Mazda and Ahriman under the names of Allah and Iblis.

Once a Zoroastrian family converted to Islam, the children had to go to a madrasa to learn Arabic along with the teachings of the Quran, and these children lost their Zoroastrian identity. These factors continued to contribute to increasing rates of conversion from Zoroastrianism to Islam. A Persian scholar commented, "Why so many had to die or suffer? Because one side was determined to impose his religion upon the other who could not understand."

In the mid-7th century CE, Persia succumbed to the invading Arabs. With the death of Yazdegerd III, who was slain in 651 after being defeated in battle, the Sassanid line came to an end and the Zoroastrian faith was replaced by Islam as the national religion of Persia.

In the following centuries, Zoroastrians faced much religious discrimination and persecution, harassments, as well as being identified as najis (polluted) and impure to Muslims, making them unfit to live alongside Muslims, and therefore forcing them to evacuate from cities and face major sanctions in all spheres of life. Zoroastrians have been subject to public humiliation through dress regulations, to being labeled as najis and to exclusion in the fields of society, education and work.

==== Rashidun Caliphate ====
Under the first four (the 'Rashidun') caliphs, Persia remained predominantly Zoroastrian. Zoroastrians were given the status of 'People of the Book' or dhimmi by the Arabs, although some practices contrary to Islam were prohibited. Many libraries were burnt and much cultural heritage was lost.

==== Umayyad Caliphate ====
The Rashidun were followed by the Umayyads, who ruled from Syria. The persecution increased in the 8th century. The jizya tax was imposed upon Zoroastrians, and the official language of Persia became Arabic instead of the local Persian. In 741, the Umayyads officially decreed that non-Muslims be excluded from governmental positions.

The Iranian Muslims at this time started a new tradition, which made Islam appear as a partly Iranian religion. They pointed out that an Iranian, Salman the Persian, had a great influence on the prophet Muhammad. They also pointed out the legend that Husayn, the son of Ali the fourth caliph, had married a Sassanian princess named Shahrbanu (lit. 'Lady of the Land'), whose son, Ali al-Sajjad, later became the fourth Shi'a Imam. The Iranian Muslims thus believed that the Shia imams descended from Sasanian royalty. These two beliefs made it easier for Zoroastrians to convert. An instance of religious oppression is recorded when an Arab governor appointed a commissioner to supervise the destruction of shrines throughout Iran, regardless of treaty obligations. The Umayyad caliph Sulayman ibn Abd al-Malik was quoted saying, "milk the Persians and once their milk dries, suck their blood".

Although the Umayyads were harsh when it came to defeating their Zoroastrian adversaries, claiming responsibility for many of the atrocities towards the Zoroastrian population during warfare, they did offer protection and relative religious tolerance to the Zoroastrians who accepted their authority. Caliph Umar II was reported to have said in one of his letters commanding not to "destroy a synagogue or a church or temple of fire worshippers (meaning the Zoroastrians) as long as they have reconciled with and agreed upon with the Muslims". Fred Donner says that Zoroastrians in the northern parts of Iran were hardly penetrated by the "believers", winning virtually complete autonomy in-return for tribute-tax (jizya)). Donner goes on to say that "Zoroastrians continued to exist in large numbers in northern and western Iran and elsewhere for centuries after the rise of Islam, and indeed, much of the canon of Zoroastrian religious texts was elaborated and written down during the Islamic period".

==== Abbasid Caliphate ====
The Umayyads were followed by the Abbasid Caliphate, which came to power with the help of Iranian Muslims in the Abbasid Revolution. The persecution of Zoroastrians increased significantly under the Abbasids, temples and sacred-fire shrines were destroyed. Also during Abbasid rule, the status of Zoroastrians in Persian lands was reduced from dhimmi—people who were protected by the state and generally considered 'People of the Book'—to 'kafirs' (non-believers). As a result, Zoroastrians were not granted the same rights and status as Jews and Christians. Iranian Muslims were welcomed to the court, but not Zoroastrians. Zoroastrians were denied access to bathhouses on the grounds that their bodies were najis (ritually unclean). Hardly any Zoroastrian family was able to avoid conversion to Islam when employed by the Abbasids. Because of their harshness towards unbelievers, and due to their lavish patronage of Persian Muslims, the Abbasids proved to be deadly foes of Zoroastrianism.

Nevertheless, there were many cases of toleration during the Abbasid era, particularly under the reign of al-Mu'tasim, who flogged an imam and muezzin for destroying a fire-temple and replacing it with a mosque. Al-Mu'tasim allowed rebuilding and the establishment of Zoroastrian fire temples in many places within the borders of the Abbasid Caliphate. It was reported that there were still a significant strength of strongholds of the Zoroastrian communities in places such as Kerman, Qom, Sistan, Fars and more that were surviving under the Abbasid regime. This is not only attested by European explorers of later times, but also the Muslim historians who were present.

=== Iranian Intermezzo ===
==== Saffarid dynasty ====
The Abbasids were followed by the Saffarids. Zoroastrians lived under the leadership of their High Priest, since they had no king. In Iraq, the political center of the Sassanian state, Zoroastrian institutions were viewed as appendages of the royal government and family, and suffered much destruction and confiscation. Closely associated with the power structures of the Persian Empire, Zoroastrian clergy quickly declined after it was deprived of the state support.

==== Samanid dynasty ====
The Samanids were of Zoroastrian theocratic nobility who voluntarily converted to Sunni Islam. During their reign, approximately 300 years after the Arab conquest, fire temples were still found in almost every province of Persia including Khorasan, Kirman, Sijistan and other areas under Samanid control. According to Al-Shahrastani, there were fire-temples even in Baghdad at the time. The historian Al-Masudi, a Baghdad-born Arab, who wrote a comprehensive treatise on history and geography in about 956, records that after the conquest:

Zoroastrianism, for the time being, continued to exist in many parts of Iran. Not only in countries which came relatively late under Muslim sway (e.g., Tabaristan) but also in those regions which early had become provinces of the Muslim empire. In almost all the Iranian provinces, according to Al Masudi, fire temples were to be found – the Madjus he says, venerate many fire temples in Iraq, Fars, Kirman, Sistan, Khurasan, Tabaristan, al Djibal, Azerbaijan and Arran.

He also added Sindh and Sin of the Indian subcontinent (Al-Hind) to the list. This general statement of al Masudi is fully supported by the medieval geographers who make mention of fire temples in most of the Iranian towns.

=== 10th–20th centuries ===
==== Continued Zoroastrian exodus to India ====
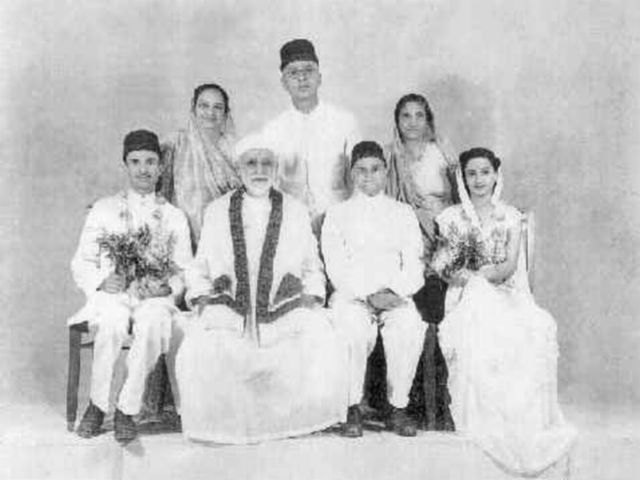
A Parsi wedding portrait, 1948

The Zoroastrians moved to India in successive migrations in the Islamic period. The generally accepted narrative of migration emphasises religious persecution by invading Muslims, while identifying Parsis as religious refugees. According to the account, the Zoroastrians suffered at their hands and in order to protect themselves and safeguard their religion, fled first to northern Iran, then to the island of Hormuz and finally to India. Recently, scholars have questioned this explanation of Iranian origins. There is a scarcity of sources about the migration. Historians are forced to rely exclusively on Qissa-i Sanjan written in 1599 by a Parsi priest and Qissah-ye Zartushtian-e Hindustan written more than 200 years later. This is complicated by the fact that there were already Zoroastrians in India in the Sasanian period. According to the legend, at the beginning of the 10th century a small group of Zoroastrians living around the town of Nyshapour and Fort of Sanjan in the province of (greater) Khorasan, decided that Iran was no longer safe for Zoroastrians and their religion. The refugees accepted the conditions and founded the settlement of Sanjan (Gujarat), which is said to have been named after the city of their origin (Sanjan, near Merv, in present-day Turkmenistan).

Iranian Zoroastrians are known to have been trading with India for centuries before the dates calculated for arrival of Parsis per Qissa-i Sanjan. Ruksana Nanji and Homi Dhalla while discussing archaeological evidence for 'The Landing of Zoroastrians at Sanjan', conclude that the most likely date for the migration at the start of the middle phase of their chronology, namely the early-to-mid-eighth century. Nevertheless, they express their general skepticism about the Qissa-i Sanjan account. Scholar Andre Wink has theorized that Zoroastrian immigrants to India, both before and after the Muslim conquest of Iran, were primarily merchants, since evidence suggests it was only some time after their arrival that religious experts and priests were sent for to join them. He argues that the competition over trade routes with Muslims may also have contributed to their immigration.

Although historically unsubstantiated, the story of how Zoroastrians gained permission to step on the shores of Gujarat continues to be critical to the self-identity of the group. Per the commonly told narrative, the Rajah of Sanjan, summoned them and demanded to know how they would not be a burden on or a threat to the indigenous communities. Replying to their request of practising their religion and till the land, he showed them a jug full of milk, saying Sanjan like it was full. In one version, a dastur added a coin to the milk, saying like the coin, no one would be able to see that they were there but they would enrich the milk nonetheless. In another version, he added sugar instead and claimed that like it, they would sweeten lands of Sanjan. In both of them their settlement is approved by the Rajah who addresses certain conditions for it: they would explain their religion, promise not to proselytise, adopt Gujarati speech and dress, surrender their weapons and only conduct their rituals after nightfall.

One of the dates that can be fixed with certainty is the arrival of Parsees in Navsari when a mobed named Kamdin Zarthost arrived there in 1142 CE to perform religious ceremonies for Zoroastrians settled there. Traditionally, the Parsee settlers had named it Navsari after Sari in Iran. However this was considered wrong by the Gazetteer of the Bombay Presidency who noted that the town was already shown in Ptolemy's map.

Apart from two accounts of confrontation in the Qissa, Parsi lore presents a smooth integration into the local culture of first their Hindu, and then Muslim neighbors. The community still exists in western India, and it currently contains the largest concentration of Zoroastrians in the world. "Parsi legends regarding their ancestors' migration to India depict a beleaguered band of religious refugees escaping the harsh rule of fanatical Muslim invaders in order to preserve their ancient faith." The epic poem Qissa-i-Sanjan (Story of Sanjan) is an account of the early years of Zoroastrian settlers on the Indian subcontinent. It is only in recent times that Parsis have become aware of the extent of the oppression that their ancestors in Iran had to endure.

==== Safavid dynasty ====
Zoroastrians had difficult time during the Safavid period and faced repeated persecution and forced conversion. Safavid kings sought to compel them to accept Shia Islam, Sunnis too were forced to convert to Shia or were persecuted, imprisoned, exiled, or killed. Zoroastrians were also branded as impure, in addition to being infidels. As earlier in the century, so this period also witnessed sporadic campaigns for the conversion of Armenians and Zoroastrians, focusing blame for economic and other ills on these and other minorities whose involvement in the spice export, for example, was well known.

In the early 16th century the great Safavid king, Shah Abbas I settled a number of Zoroastrians in a suburb of his new capital, Isfahan. The suburb of Isfahan where the Zoroastrians lived was called Gabr-Mahal, Gabristan or Gabrabad, derived from the word Gabr. Europeans who visited his court left accounts of the 'Gabars' or 'Gabrs' (an insulting term used for Zoroastrians by the Muslims), agree on the poverty and simplicity of their lives. Fearing desecration by Muslims, Zoroastrians hid the sacred fires, and conversed in a newly invented dialect called Dari. Later Safavid kings were not as tolerant as Shah Abbas. Muhammad Baqir Majlisi persuaded Sultan Husayn (1688–1728 CE) to decree the forcible conversion of Zoroastrians; those who refused were killed.

The accounts in Mino Khirad, written during the Safavid period, demonstrate that the Zoroastrians were subjected to harassment by the Shi'ite majority, their places of worship were under a constant threat of being destroyed. By 1707, when Le Bruyn visited Isfahan, the Zoroastrians were no longer able practice their religion freely. He notes that the most deprived Zoroastrians had been brought to Isfahan, and had been forced to become Muslim three years earlier. In 1821, Ker Porter visiting Isfahan notes that there were hardly any Zoroastrians left in Isfahan and Gabrabad was in ruins.

==== Qajar dynasty ====
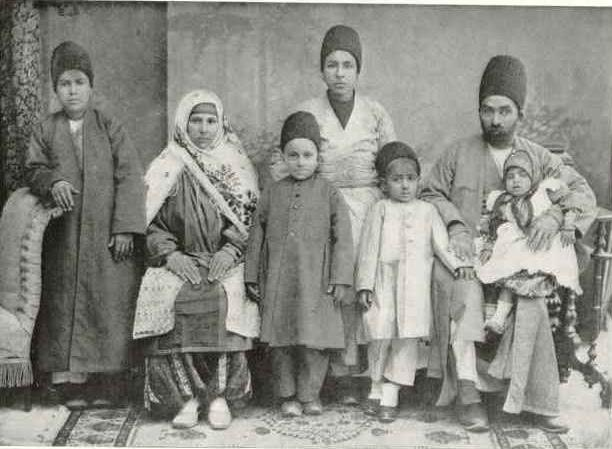
A Zoroastrian family in Qajar Iran, circa 1910

A Zoroastrian astrologer named Mulla Gushtasp predicted the fall of the Zand dynasty to the Qajar army in Kerman. Because of Gushtasp's forecast, the Zoroastrians of Kerman were spared by the conquering army of Agha Mohammad Khan Qajar. Despite the aforementioned favorable incident, the Zoroastrians during the Qajar dynasty remained in agony and their population continued to decline. Even during the rule of Agha Mohammad Khan, the founder of the dynasty, many Zoroastrians were killed and some were taken as captives to Azerbaijan. Zoroastrians regard the Qajar period as one of their worst.

Many foreign visitors to Iran of the time had commented on their pitiful situation. Traveller A.V.W. Jackson noted that Zoroastrians lived in constant fear of persecution by Muslim extremists and their lives were in danger whenever the fanatical spirit of Islam broke out, such as the one witnessed by him in Yazd. According to Edward Browne, the wall of Zoroastrian houses had to be lower than that of the Muslims and prohibited from marking their houses with distinctive signs. Zoroastrians were forbidden from erecting new houses and repairing old ones.

Various methods were used to proselytize the minorities. According to a law, if any member of family converted to Islam, he/she was entitled to all inheritance. They were forbidden from taking up lucrative occupations. The community was regarded as outcast, impure and untouchable. The Zoroastrians and their food was considered impure and many public places refused to serve them. When they shopped in the bazaar, they were not allowed to touch any food or fruits. They were threatened with forced conversions, beaten up and fleeced, and their religious sanctuaries were regularly desecrated. Harassments and persecution were the norms of daily life. Zoroastrians were often attacked and beaten by Muslims in the streets. The murders of Zoroastrians were not punished. At times, Zoroastrian girls were kidnapped and forcefully converted and married to Muslims and brought to town in fanfare.

Zoroastrians were subjected to public discrimination through dress regulations – not allowed to wear new or white clothes, and compelled by enactments to wear the dull yellow raiment already alluded to as a distinguishing badge. They were not allowed to wear overcoats but were compelled to wear long robes called qaba and cotton geeveh on their feet even in winter. Wearing eyeglasses, long cloak, trousers, hat, boots, socks, winding their turbans tightly and neatly, carrying watches or rings, were all forbidden to Zoroastrians. During the rainy days they were not allowed carry umbrellas or to appear in public, because the water that had run down through their bodies and cloths could pollute the Muslims. Zoroastrian men in Yazd would carry a large shawl that they would place under their feet when visiting a Muslim's home so as to prevent the carpet from being polluted. Forbidden from riding horses and only allowed to ride mules or donkeys, upon facing a Muslim they had to dismount. The general proscription against Zoroastrians' riding horses and donkeys was lifted by Reza Shah in 1923.

On top of all the misery the Zoroastrians had to pay a heavy religious tax known as Jizya. Zoroastrian sources record the method of extracting this as designed to humiliate the dhimmi, the taxed person, who was compelled to stand while the officer receiving the money sat on a high throne. Upon receiving the payment, the officer gave the dhimmi a blow on the neck and drove him roughly away. The public was invited to watch the spectacle. Arab tax collectors would mock Zoroastrians for wearing Kushti and would rip it off, hanging the cord around the necks of the beleaguered faithful. Due to corruption of the tax officials, at times twice and even three times the official figure would be collected, because every intermediary had to receive his share. If the families could not afford paying the Jizya, their children were beaten and even tortured and their religious books were thrown in fire. That is how the term "the bookless" came about. Under the woeful conditions, some had to convert and there were those who declared themselves Muslims, picked up Islamic names, but in secret continued Zoroastrian practices. Today the latter group among the Zoroastrians is known as Jaddid. In response to persecution and segregation policies, the Zoroastrians community became closed, introverted, and static.

Zoroastrian massacres did not cease during the Qajar rule. The last two are recorded at the villages surrounding the city of Boarzjan and Turkabad near Yazd. Today, the village of Maul Seyyed Aul near Borazjan, among the local people is known as "killing site" (Ghatl-Gauh), and Zoroastrian surnames of Turk, Turki, Turkian and Turkabadi reflect lineage to the survivors of Turkabad. In the 1850s, Comte de Gobineau, the French Ambassador to Iran, wrote: "Only 6000 of them are left and just a miracle may save them from extinction. These are the descendants of the people who one day ruled the world."

Due to the extent of oppression, and destitution, many Zoroastrians ventured to the hazardous journey to India. Those who could not afford the voyage aboard the ships, risked their lives by crossing the hostile desert on donkeys or even on foot. In India, they were recognized for Sedreh and Kushti and were sheltered by their Parsi brethren. There, they formed the second major Indian Zoroastrian community known as the Iranis.

===== Indian Zoroastrian aid efforts =====
When the news of their plight reached the Parsis, who by this time had become quite prosperous, Parsi funds were set up to help the Iranian Zoroastrians and emissaries were dispatched to Iran. A Parsi philanthropist, Maneckji Limji Hataria, was sent to help them. He found only 7711 Zoroastrians in Kerman, Yazd and Tehran (now the capital of Iran). Using his influence with the British government he managed to get some of the repression against Zoroastrians removed. Jizya was paid by the Zoroastrian minority until 1882, when it was removed by pressure on the Qajar government from the Persian Zoroastrian Amelioration Fund.

The Zoroastrian Trust Funds of Europe (ZTFE), also attempted to alleviate the conditions of their Iranian brethren. Both Dadabhai Naoroji and Mancherjee Bhownagree, as presidents of the ZTFE and Members of Parliament addressed the House of Commons of the United Kingdom on the issue of the persecution of Zoroastrians in Iran. On the six occasions, Shah Naser al-Din Shah Qajar visited London; Parsi delegations from the ZTFE were present to advocate for their Iranian co-religionists suffering the intense persecution of the Qajar dynasty.

==== Islamic Republic of Iran ====
The 1979 Islamic revolution was equally traumatic for the remaining Zoroastrians, and their numbers reduced drastically. Immediately after the revolution, during Bazargan's premiership, Muslim revolutionaries "walked into the main Zoroastrian fire temple in Tehran and removed the portrait of the Prophet Zoroaster and replaced it with one of [Ayatollah] Khomeini".

However, just like the Armenian, Assyrian and Persian Jewish communities, Zoroastrians are officially recognized and on the grounds of the 1906 Constitution allocated one seat in the Iranian Parliament, formerly held by Esfandiar Ekhtiari Kassnavieh and currently held by Behshid Barkhodar. Out-marriage and low birth rates affect the growth of Iran's Zoroastrian population which, according to Iran's 2012 census results, stood at 25,271, though this represented an increase of 27.5% on the 2006 population.

In 2013, Sepanta Niknam was elected to the city council of Yazd and became the first Zoroastrian councillor in Iran.

== Sectarianism in medieval Zoroastrianism ==
Mazdakism was viewed by the Zoroastrian hierarchy as a heresy and its followers were persecuted by Zoroastrian Sassanian leaders. The Sassanian ruler Khosrau I launched a campaign against the Mazdakis in 524 or 528, culminating in a massacre which killed most of them, including Mazdak himself and restored orthodox Zoroastrianism as the state religion.

Various accounts specify the way of death: for example, the Shahnameh states that the three thousand Mazdakis were buried alive with the feet upwards in order to present Mazdak with the spectacle of a "human garden", whereas Mazdak himself was hanged upside down and shot with countless arrows; other stories specify other torturous methods of execution. In any case, Anushiravan then proceeded to implement his own far-reaching social and administrative reforms. Mazdakism almost disappeared after the massacre. Later, there were instances in which Zoroastrian clergy were assisted by Muslims against Zoroastrians whom the Zoroastrian clergy considered to be heretics or separatists.

== See also ==
- Parsis of India
- Iranis of India
- Zoroastrianism in Iran
- Qissa-i Sanjan (Story of Sanjan)
- Conversion of non-Islamic places of worship into mosques
- History of Bukhara
- Persecution of Buddhists by Zoroastrians

== Bibliography ==
- Abisaab, Rula Jurdi (2004), Converting Persia: religion and power in the Safavid Empire, I.B.Tauris, p. 243, ISBN 9781860649707
- Akram, A. I. (1970), The sword of Allah, Khalid bin al-Waleed: his life and campaigns, National Pub. House, p. 504
- al-Tabari, Muhammad ibn Jarir, Tarikh al-Tabari [History of the Prophets and Kings] (in Persian), vol. II
- Amighi, Janet Kestenberg (1990), The Zoroastrians of Iran: conversion, assimilation, or persistence (illustrated ed.), AMS Press, p. 416, ISBN 9780404626037
- Arnold, Sir Thomas Walker (1896), The preaching of Islam: a history of the propagation of the Muslim faith, A. Constable and co., p. 388
- Becci, Irene; Burchardt, Marian; Casanova, Jose (2013), "Excarnation and the City: The Tower of Silence in Mumbai", Topographies of Faith: Religion in Urban Spaces, Brill, p. 75, ISBN 978-9004249073
- Bleeker, Claas Jouco; Widengren, Geo (1971), Historia Religionum: Religions of the present, vol. II, Brill, p. 715, ISBN 9789004025981
- Berkey, Jonathan Porter (2003), The formation of Islam: religion and society in the Near East, 600–1800, vol. II, Cambridge University Press, p. 286, ISBN 9780521588133
- Bonner, Michael (7 March 2020), Last empire of Iran
- Boyce, Mary (2001), Zoroastrians, their religious beliefs and practices (2 ed.), New York: Routledge & Kegan Paul, p. 252, ISBN 9780415239028
- Boyce, Mary (1975), "Iconoclasm among the Zoroastrians", Studies for Morton Smith at Sixty, IV, J. Neusner, Leiden: 93–111
- Boyle, Kevin; Sheen, Juliet (1997), Freedom of religion and belief: a world report (2 ed.), Psychology Press, p. 475, ISBN 9780415159784
- Browne, Edward Granville (1893), A year amongst the Persians, Adam and Charles Black, p. 594
- Choksy, Jamsheed K. (1997), Conflict and Cooperation: Zoroastrian Subalterns and Muslim Elites in Medieval Iranian Society (Illustrated ed.), Columbia University Press, p. 207, ISBN 9780231106849
- Choksy, Jamsheed K. (1987), "Zoroastrians in Muslim Iran: Selected Problems of Coexistence and Interaction during the Early Medieval Period", Iranian Studies, 20 (1), Taylor & Francis Ltd.: 17–30, doi:10.1080/00210868708701689, ISSN 1475-4819
- Comte de Gobineau (1869), Histoire des Perses (History of the Persians) [History of the Persians] (in French), vol. II
- Fischer, Michael M. J. (2003), Iran: from religious dispute to revolution (illustrated ed.), Univ of Wisconsin Press, p. 314, ISBN 9780299184742
- Gordon, Matthew (2005), The rise of Islam (Illustrated ed.), Greenwood Publishing Group, p. 180, ISBN 9780313325229
- Hillenbrand, R, Bearman, P.J.; Bosworth, C.E. (eds.), Masdjid. I. In the central Islamic lands, Encyclopaedia of Islam, Brill Academic Publishers, ISSN 1573-3912
- Hinnells, John R. (1996), Zoroastrians in Britain: the Ratanbai Katrak lectures, University of Oxford 1985 (Illustrated ed.), Oxford University Press, p. 336, ISBN 9780198261933
- Hodivala, Shahpurshah Hormasji (1920), Studies in Parsi History, Bombay: Captain Print Works, p. 349
- Houtsma, Martijn Theodoor (1936), First Encyclopaedia of Islam 1913-1936: E.J.Brill's, BRILL, ISBN 90-04-09796-1, 9789004097964
- Ibn Balkhi (1934), Farsnameh (Epic of the Persians) [Epic of the Persians] (in Persian)
- Ibn Esfandiar (1941), Tarikh-e Tabarestan (History of Tabarestan) [History of Tabarestan] (in Persian)
- Jackson, Abraham Valentine Williams (1906), Persia past and present: a book of travel and research, with more than two hundred illustrations and a map, The Macmillan Company, p. 471
- Karaka, Dosabhai Framji (1884), History of the Parsis: including their manners, customs, religion, and present position, vol. I, Macmillan and co., ISBN 0-404-12812-2
- Lambton, Ann K. S. (1981), State and government in medieval Islam: an introduction to the study of Islamic political theory: the jurists (reprint ed.), Routledge, p. 364, ISBN 9780197136003
- Lapidus, Ira Marvin (2002), A history of Islamic societies (2 ed.), Cambridge University Press, p. 970, ISBN 9780521779333
- Khanbaghi, Aptin (2006), The fire, the star and the cross: minority religions in medieval and early (reprint ed.), I.B.Tauris, p. 268, ISBN 9781845110567
- Lewis, Bernard (1984), The Jews of Islam, Princeton: Princeton University Press, p. 280, ISBN 0-691-00807-8
- Maneck, Susan Stiles (1997), The Death of Ahriman: Culture, Identity, and Theological Change Among the Parsis of India, Bombay: University of Arizona, p. 446
- Meri, Josef W.; Bacharach, Jere L. (2006), Medieval Islamic Civilization: L-Z, index, Medieval Islamic Civilization: An Encyclopedia, vol. II (illustrated ed.), Taylor & Francis, p. 878, ISBN 9780415966924
- Newman, Andrew J. (2006), Safavid Iran: rebirth of a Persian empire (Illustrated ed.), I.B.Tauris, p. 281, ISBN 9781860646676
- Nigosian, Solomon Alexander (1993), The Zoroastrian faith: tradition and modern research, Montreal: McGill-Queen's Press, p. 154, ISBN 9780773511446
- Stillman, Norman (1979), The Jews of Arab Lands: A History and Source Book, Philadelphia: Jewish Publication Society of America, p. 473, ISBN 1-82760-198-1
- Paymaster, Rustom Burjorji (1954), Early History of the Parsees in India, Bombay: Zarthoshti Dharam Sambandhi, p. 151
- Price, Massoume (2005), Iran's diverse peoples: a reference sourcebook (Illustrated ed.), ABC-CLIO, p. 376, ISBN 9781576079935
- Ramazani, Nesta (2002), The dance of the rose and the nightingale (illustrated ed.), Syracuse University Press, p. 302, ISBN 9780815607274
- Ringer, Monica M. (2011), Pious Citizens: Reforming Zoroastrianism in India and Iran, Syracuse University Press, pp. 25, 26, ISBN 978-0815650607
- Rose, Jenny (2011), Zoroastrianism: An Introduction, I.B. Tauris, p. 194, ISBN 978-1848850880
- Sanasarian, Eliz (2000), Religious minorities in Iran (Illustrated ed.), Cambridge University Press, p. 228, ISBN 9780521770736
- Selbie, John Alexander (1914), "GABARS", in Hastings, James; Gray, Louis Herbert; Selbie, John Alexander (eds.), Encyclopædia of religion and ethics, vol. VI, T. & T. Clark, ISBN 0-567-06512-X
- Shahmardan, Rashid, History of Zoroastrians past Sasanians
- Shojaeddin Shaffa, Tavalodī Dīgar (Another Birth) [Another Birth] (in Persian) (3 ed.)
- Spuler, Bertold (1994), A History of the Muslim World: The age of the caliphs (Illustrated ed.), Markus Wiener Publishers, p. 138, ISBN 9781558760950
- Stepaniants, Marietta (2002), "The Encounter of Zoroastrianism with Islam", Philosophy East and West, 52 (2), University of Hawai'i Press: 159–172, doi:10.1353/pew.2002.0030, ISSN 0031-8221, JSTOR 1399963, S2CID 201748179
- Wherry, Rev. Elwood Morris (1896), A Comprehensive Commentary on the Quran: Comprising Sale's Translation and Preliminary Discourse, K. Paul, Trench, Trübner & co.
- Williams, Alan (2009), The Zoroastrian Myth of Migration from Iran and Settlement in the Indian Diaspora: Text, Translation and Analysis of the 16th Century Qesse-ye Sanjān 'The Story of Sanjan, Brill, pp. 205, 206, ISBN 978-9047430421
- Writer, Rashna (1989), "Parsi Identity", Iran, 27, British Institute of Persian Studies: 129–131, doi:10.2307/4299826, JSTOR 4299826, archived from the original on 29 April 2007
- Yarshater, Ehsan, The Cambridge history of Iran, vol. 2
- Zeidan, Georgie, The History of the Islamic Civilization, vol. III
