= Sanjan Stambh =

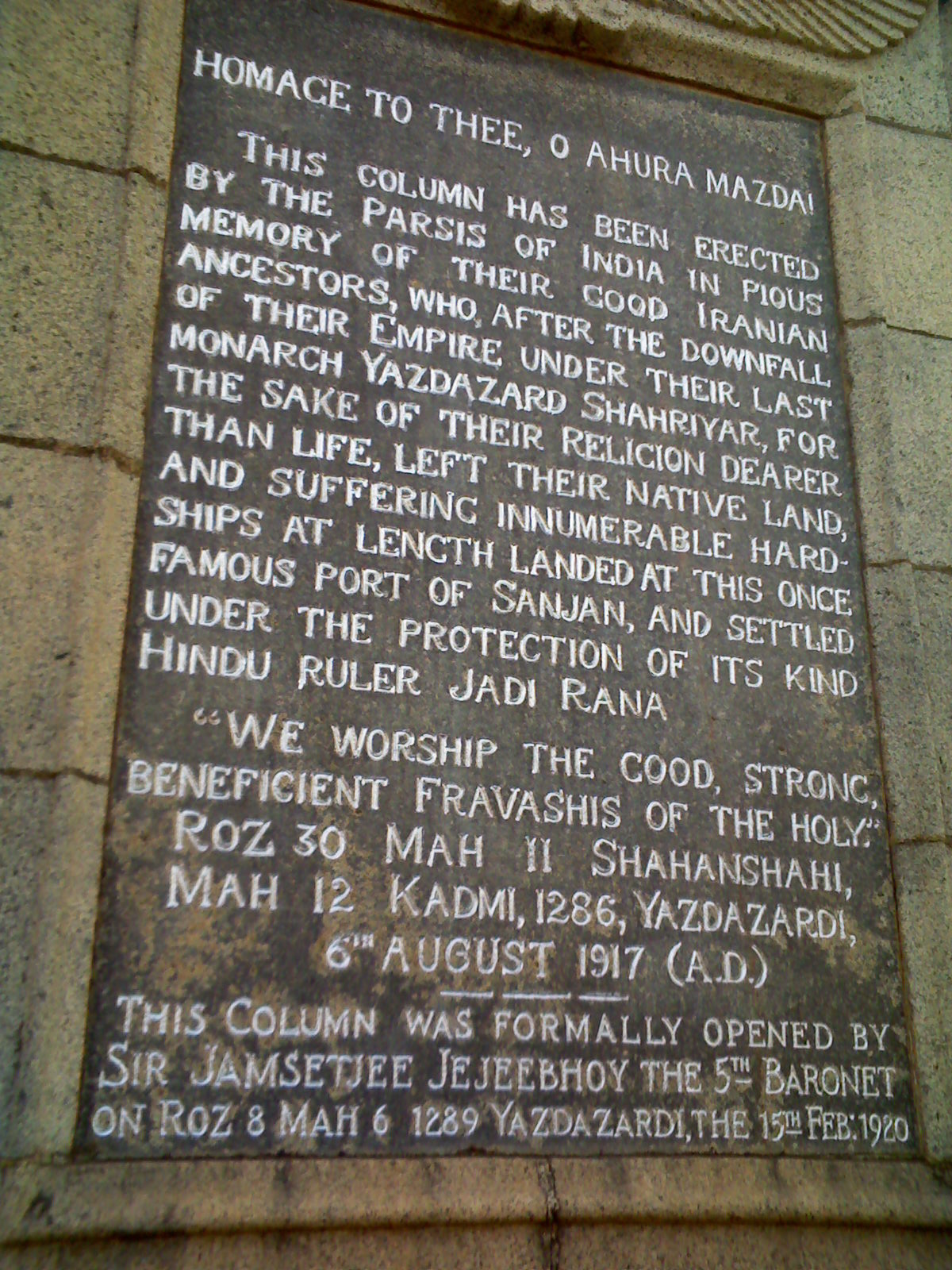
Plaque on the monument

Sanjan Stambh is a memorial column at Sanjan in Gujarat, which commemorates the arrival of Zoroastrians there eleven centuries ago as a group of shipwrecked migrants who had fled Muslim persecution after the downfall of the Persian Empire and were welcomed to India by Hindu king Jadi Rana.

It states the date of arrival at 936 CE. It was constructed in the year 1920 to perpetuate the memory of the arrival of the Zoroastrians in India. There is a Parsi dharamshala in the complex. The local Parsis of Sanjan celebrate the arrival of the community by celebrating Sanjan Day in November. The 'Stambh' is made of Vadodara granite. Its height, including the leaping flames of fire is 50 feet. The column rests on a square platform. There are 23 decorative rosettes.
