= Mahanid Emirate =

Arab state in India from 813 to 841

The Mahanid Emirate, also known as the Mahanid State or Māhāniyyah Kingdom, was an Arab state that existed in India from 813 to 841. It was established during the reign of Abbasid caliph al-Ma'mun and continued to exist until the reign of al-Mu'tasim. It was reportedly the first Arab state to become administratively independent from the Abbasid Caliphate while continuing to acknowledge Abbasid authority through the khutba and allegiance. The Mahanid State was established in Sandān or Sindān in 813 by its founder, al-Fadl ibn Māhān. Sandan, an Arabized form of Sanjan was a town in Gujarat, north of present-day Mumbai.

== History ==
The Mahanid Emirate in Sandan was established in 813, during the reign of Abbasid caliph al-Ma'mun (r. 813–833), making it one of the earliest independent Arab emirates in the Indian subcontinent. It was founded by al-Fadl ibn Māhān, a mawla (freedman) of the Banu Sama ibn Lu'ayy. After conquering Sandan, he built a congregational mosque there, informed Calip al-Ma'mun of his conquest, and had prayers said for him in the congregational mosque he had established in the city. Al-Ma'mun subsequently sent him a gifts. As a result, Sandan's administrative dependence on the Kingdom of Ballhara came to end. Following the death of Emir al-Fadl ibn Mahan, he was succeeded by his son Muhammad, who dispatched a naval expedition of seventy warships against the pirates to suppress their activities off the coast of the emirate. During the campaign, he succeeded in killing a large number of them and captured the city of Palithana (in Saurashtra). According to the account of Ibn Khordadbeh, the territory under the rule of Sandan extended as far as Dahanj, Pali, Bharuch. Pali was situated near the port of Ghogha, where a Jain temple associated with the Palithana was also well known. When Emir Muhammad returned to Sandan after suppressing the pirates, he found that his brother Mahan ibn al-Fadl had already taken control of Sandan. Muhammad was removed, and because of the support of the people, he was executed by crucifixion. Mahan also sent a number of gifts to the Caliph al-Mu'tasim (r. 833–842). The newly established emirate could not withstand this internal dispute, and the local Indians again took control of Sandan in 841. They nevertheless left the congregational mosque and its internal administration intact.
