= Parsis =

Zoroastrian community in the Indian subcontinent

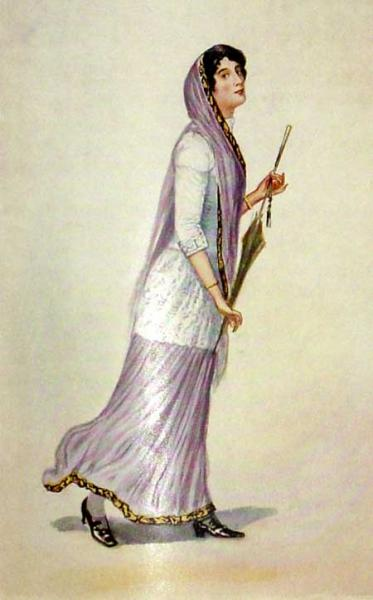
- A Parsi Lady (c. 1928); Mahadev V. Dhurandhar

Regions with significant populations
- India: 57,264
- Canada: 3,630 (Note: Total population of Zoroastrian religion respondents of South Asian descent.)
- Pakistan: 2,348

Languages
- Gujarati, Marathi, Hindi–Urdu, English, Avestan (liturgical)

Religion
- Zoroastrianism

Related ethnic groups
- Iranis, Gujaratis, Marathis

The Parsis or Parsees (/ˈpɑːrsiz/) are an ethnoreligious community in the Indian subcontinent. They are descended from Persian refugees who migrated to the subcontinent during and after the Arab conquest of Iran in the 7th century, when Zoroastrians were persecuted by the early Muslims. Parsis are the elder of the Indian subcontinent's two Zoroastrian communities, being culturally, linguistically, and socially distinct from Iranis, Zoroastrians who migrated from Qajar Iran. The word Parsi is derived from the Persian language, and literally translates to Persian (پارسی, Pārsi). Parsi communities have settled in India, Pakistan, China, Bangladesh, Sri Lanka, the United States, the United Kingdom, and Canada.

According to the 16th-century Parsi epic Qissa-i Sanjan ("Sugar in the Milk"), fleeing persecution, the Zarthushti (Zoroastrian) Persians, citizens of the Sassanian Empire, sought refuge in India. This migration from different parts of the empire continued between the 7th century and the 10th century. The earliest of these migrants settled among the Hindus of present-day Gujarat after being granted refuge by Jadi Rana, the Rajput king of Sanjan. When Rana feared his kingdom was full and could not accommodate them, a Parsi priest added sugar to a vessel of milk, demonstrating they would blend in and enrich the local culture without causing disruption.

Zoroastrianism (Zarathushti Pantha) had served as Iran's state religion since at least the time of the Achaemenid Empire. However, the conquest of the Sasanian Empire by the Rashidun Caliphate marked the beginning of the Islamisation of Iran, which prompted much of the Zoroastrian-majority population to either convert to Islam or flee, though a number of Iranian figures stayed in active revolt against the Rashidun army and the later Islamic caliphates for almost 500 years after the collapse of the Sasanian Empire. Nevertheless, Zoroastrianism continued to decline, and most Iranians had become Muslims by the 10th century, shifting the concentration of the religion's followers away from the Iranian plateau for the first time in recorded history.

The Gujarati-speaking and Marathi-speaking Parsi community accounts for the oldest sustained presence of Zoroastrianism in India, and is legally differentiated from the Dari-speaking Irani community on the basis of their origin (Sanjan and Navsari in Central Asia) and the era of their migration to the country. Despite this legal distinction, the terms "Parsi" and "Zoroastrian" are commonly used interchangeably to denote both communities, which make up the world's largest Zoroastrian population. Notably, no substantial differences exist between Parsi and Irani religious principles, convictions, and customs.

The Parsis became highly influential in trade, industry, culture, and philanthropy. Icons from the Parsis include Jamsetji Tata, Homi Bhabha, Zubin Mehta, Rohinton Mistry, and Dadabhai Naoroji.

== Definition and identity ==
According to the Encyclopædia Britannica,

Parsi, also spelled Parsee, member of a group of followers in India of the Persian prophet Zoroaster. The Parsis, whose name means "Persians", are descended from Persian Zoroastrians who emigrated to India to avoid religious persecution by the Muslims. They live chiefly in Mumbai and in a few towns and villages mostly to the south of Mumbai, but also a few minorities nearby in Karachi (Pakistan) and Chennai. There is a sizeable Parsee population in Pune as well in Bangalore. A few Parsee families also reside in Kolkata and Hyderabad. Although they are not, strictly speaking, a caste, since they are not Hindus, they form a well-defined community. The exact date of the Parsi migration is unknown. According to tradition, the Parsis initially settled at Hormuz on the Persian Gulf but finding themselves still persecuted they set sail for India, arriving in the 8th century. The migration may, in fact, have taken place as late as the 10th century, or in both. They settled first at Diu in Kathiawar but soon moved to South Gujarāt, where they remained for about 800 years as a small agricultural community.

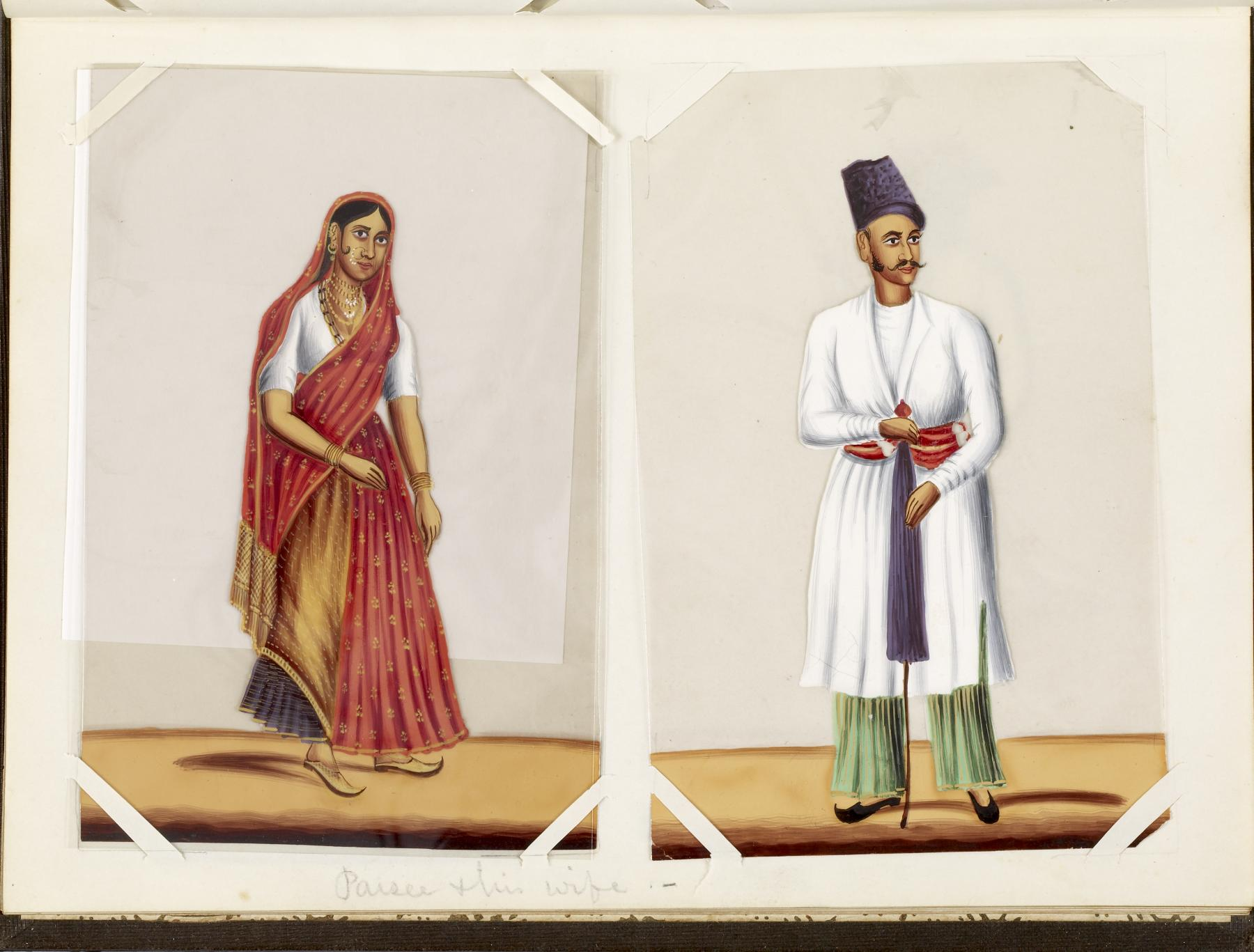
Parsis from India, c. 1870

The term Pārsi, which in the Persian language is a demonym meaning "inhabitant of Pārs" and hence "ethnic Persian", is not attested in Indian Zoroastrian texts until the 17th century. Until that time, such texts consistently use the Persian-origin terms Zartoshti "Zoroastrian" or Vehdin "[of] the good religion". The 12th-century Sixteen Shlokas, a Sanskrit text in praise of the Parsis, is the earliest attested use of the term as an identifier for Indian Zoroastrians.

The first reference to the Parsis in a European language is from 1322, when a French monk, Jordanus, briefly refers to their presence in Thane and Bharuch. Subsequently, the term appears in the journals of many European travelers, first French and Portuguese, later English, all of whom used a Europeanized version of an apparently local language term. For example, Portuguese physician Garcia de Orta observed in 1563 that "there are merchants ... in the kingdom of Cambaia ... known as Esparcis. We Portuguese call them Jews, but they are not so. They are Gentios." In an early 20th-century legal ruling (see self-perceptions, below), Justices Davar and Beaman asserted (1909:540) that "Parsi" was also a term used in Iran to refer to Zoroastrians. notes that in much the same way as the word "Hindu" was used by Iranians to refer to anyone from the Indian subcontinent, "Parsi" was used by the Indians to refer to anyone from Greater Iran, irrespective of whether they were actually ethnic Persian people. In any case, the term "Parsi" itself is "not necessarily an indication of their Iranian or 'Persian' origin, but rather as indicator – manifest as several properties – of ethnic identity". Moreover, if heredity were the only factor in a determination of ethnicity, the Parsis would count as Parthians according to the Qissa-i Sanjan.

The term "Parseeism" or "Parsiism", is attributed to Abraham Hyacinthe Anquetil-Duperron, who in the 1750s, when the word "Zoroastrianism" had yet to be coined, made the first detailed report of the Parsis and of Zoroastrianism, therein mistakenly assuming that the Parsis were the only remaining followers of the religion.

Some older texts also refer to Parsis as "Persees".

In addition to above, the term "Parsi" (Persian) existed even before they moved to India:

- The earliest reference to the Persians is found in the Assyrian inscription of Shalmaneser III (c. 854-824 BC).
- Darius the Great (521–486 BC) establishes this fact when he records his Parsi ancestry for posterity, "parsa parsahya puthra ariya ariyachitra", meaning, "a Persian, the son of a Persian, an Aryan, of Aryan family" (Inscription at Naqsh-i-Rustam, near Persepolis, Iran).
- In Outlines of Persian History, Dasturji Hormazdyar Dastur Kayoji Mirza, Bombay 1987, pp. 3–4 writes, "According to the Pahlavi text of Karnamak i Artakhshir i Papakan, the Indian astrologer refers to Artakhshir (Sasanian king, and the founder of the Empire) as khvatay parsikan 'the king of the Persians'.
- Herodotus and Xenophon, the two great historians who lived in the third and fourth centuries BC, referred to Iranians as Persians.

== Origin ==
In ancient Persia, Zarathushtra taught that good (Ohrmazd) and evil (Angra Mainyu) were opposite forces and the battle between them is more or less evenly matched. A person should always be vigilant to align with forces of light. According to the asha or the righteousness and druj or the wickedness, the person has chosen in their life they will be judged at the Chinvat bridge to grant passage to Paradise, Hammistagan (A limbo area) or Hell by the bridge remaining wide for a righteous soul and turning narrow as a sword for the wicked. Goddess Daena, personification of the soul that represents the person's deeds takes the adjudged to their destination and they will abide there until the final apocalypse. After the final battle between good and evil, every soul's walk through a river of fire ordeal for burning of their dross and together they receive a post resurrection paradise. The Zoroastrian holy book, called the Avesta, was written in the Avestan language, which is closely related to Vedic Sanskrit.

The Qissa-i Sanjan is a tale of the journey of the Parsis to India from Iran. It says they fled for reasons of religious freedom and they were allowed to settle in India thanks to the goodwill of a local prince. However, the Parsi community had to abide by three rules: they had to speak the local language, follow local marriage customs, and not carry any weapons. After showing the many similarities between their faith and local beliefs, the early community was granted a plot of land on which to build a fire temple.

=== As an ethnic community ===
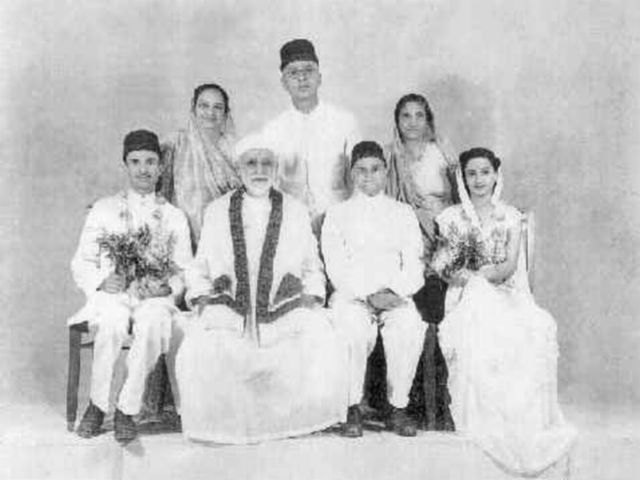
Wedding portrait, 1948

Over the centuries since the first Zoroastrians arrived in India, the Parsis have integrated themselves into Indian society while simultaneously maintaining or developing their own distinct customs and traditions (and thus ethnic identity). This in turn has given the Parsi community a rather peculiar standing: they are mostly Indians in terms of national affiliation, language and history, but not typically Indian in terms of consanguinity or ethnicity, cultural, behavioural and religious practices.

=== Self-perceptions ===
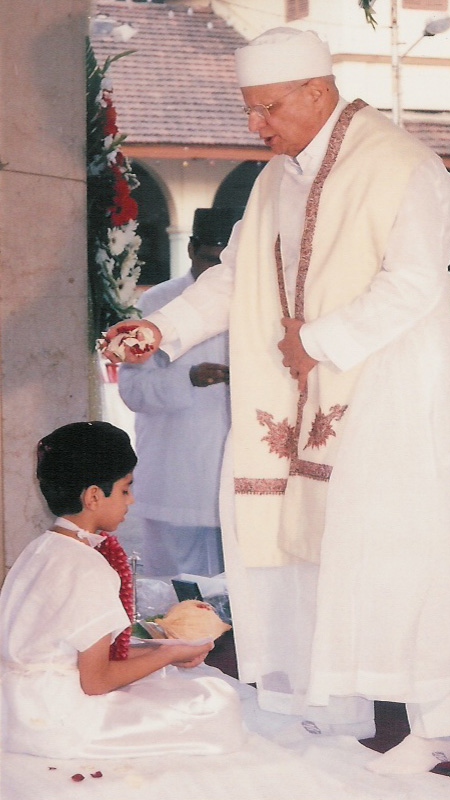
Parsi Navjote ceremony (rites of admission into the Zoroastrian faith)

The definition of who is, and is not, a Parsi is a matter of great contention within the Zoroastrian community in India. It is generally accepted that a Parsi is a person who:

(a) is directly descended from the original Persian refugees, and
(b) has been formally admitted into the Zoroastrian religion, through the navjote ceremony.

In this sense, Parsi is an ethnoreligious designator, whose definition is of contention among its members, similar to the identity question among Jews.

Some members of the community additionally contend that a child must have a Parsi father to be eligible for introduction into the faith, but this assertion is considered by most to be a violation of the Zoroastrian tenets of gender equality and may be a remnant of an old legal definition of the term Parsi.

An oft-quoted legal definition of Parsi is based on a 1909 ruling (since nullified) that not only stipulated that a person could not become a Parsi by converting to the Zoroastrian faith but also noted:

the Parsi community consists of: a) Parsis who are descended from the original Persian emigrants and who are born of both Zoroastrian parents and who profess the Zoroastrian religion; b) Iranis [here meaning Iranians, not the other group of Indian Zoroastrians] professing the Zoroastrian religion; c) the children of Parsi fathers by alien mothers who have been duly and properly admitted into the religion.

This definition was overturned several times. The equality principles of the Indian Constitution void the patrilineal restrictions expressed in the third clause. The second clause was contested and overturned in 1948. On appeal in 1950, the 1948 ruling was upheld and the entire 1909 definition was deemed an obiter dictum – a collateral opinion and not legally binding (re-affirmed in 1966).

== Population ==
Historical population of Parsis in India
Year	Pop.	±% p.a.
1872	69,476	—
1881	85,397	+2.32%
1891	89,904	+0.52%
1901	94,190	+0.47%
1911	100,096	+0.61%
1921	101,778	+0.17%
1931	109,752	+0.76%
1941	114,890	+0.46%
1971	91,266	−0.76%
1981	71,630	−2.39%
2001	69,601	−0.14%
2011	57,264	−1.93%

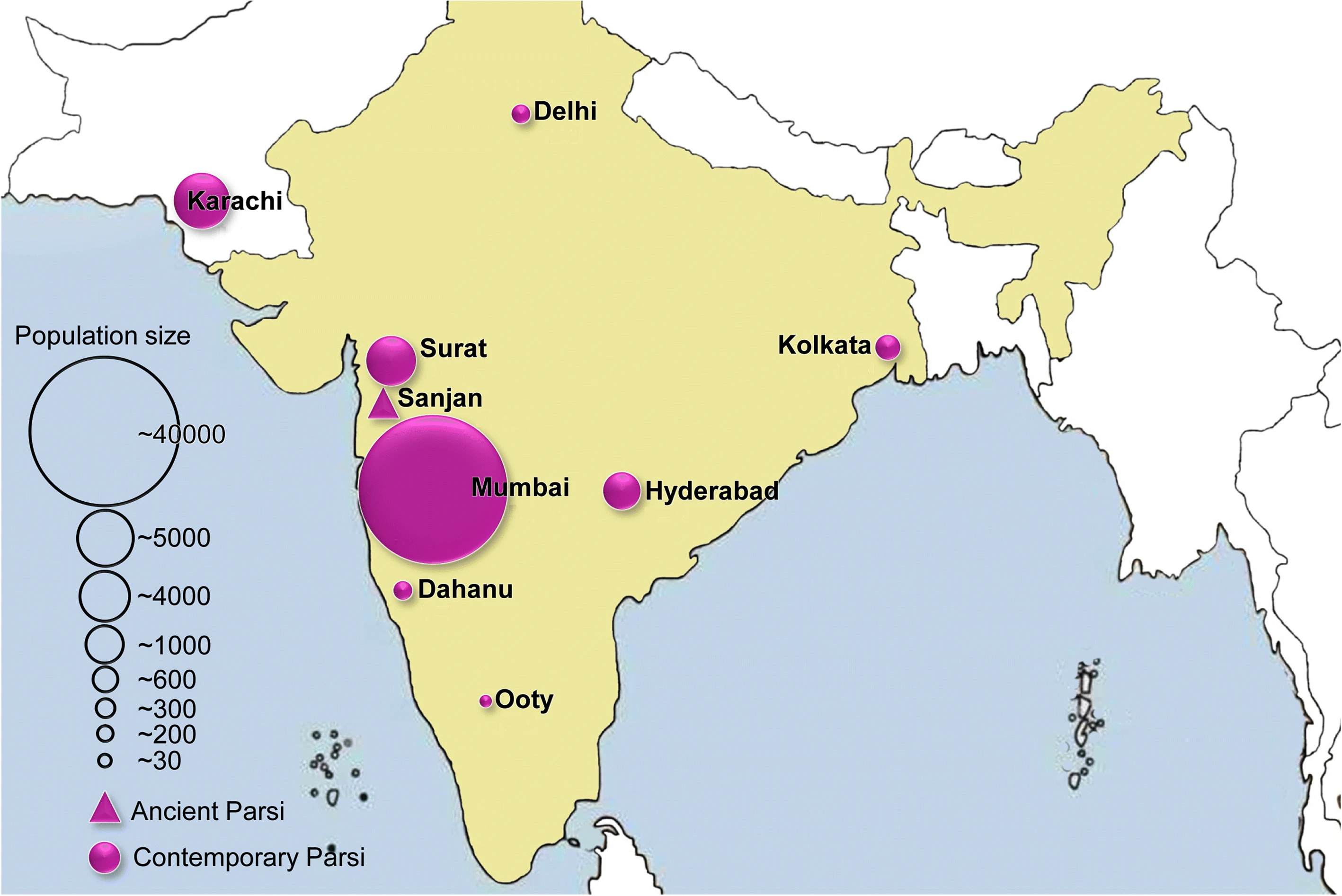
The geographical distribution of modern and ancient Parsis in India and Pakistan.

According to the 2011 census of India, there are 57,264 Parsis in India. According to the National Commission for Minorities, there are a "variety of causes that are responsible for this steady decline in the population of the community", the most significant of which were childlessness and migration.

The Parsi population increased by 233 between 2013 and 2020. As per Parsiana the deaths in the community outnumber births by a ratio of approximately four to one, with roughly 600 deaths annually against 150 births in India.

One-fifth of the decrease in population is attributed to migration. There are sizeable Parsi communities in the United Kingdom, Australia, Canada, and the United States. A slower birthrate than deathrate accounts for the rest: as of 2001, Parsis over the age of 60 make up for 31% of the community. Only 4.7% of the Parsi community are under 6 years of age, which translates to 7 births per year per 1,000 individuals. Concerns have been raised in recent years over the rapidly declining population of the Parsi community in India.

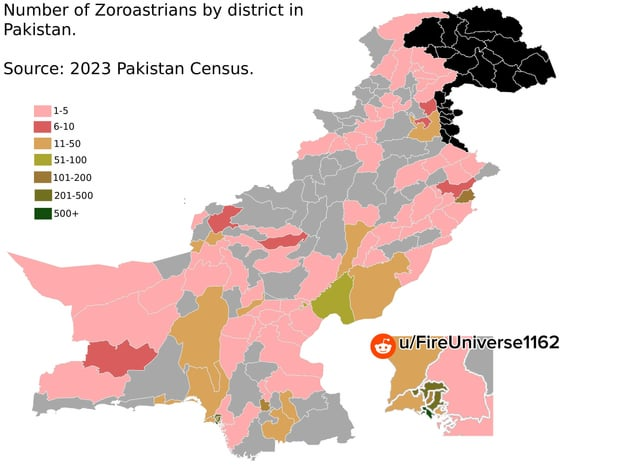
Number of Zoroastrians in Pakistan by district in 2023

=== Ties to modern-day Iran ===
Parsis have also been migrating to the traditional homeland of Iran and while the number of Parsis who have returned to Iran is small compared to the overall Zoroastrian community in Iran, their presence has helped to strengthen the ties between the Iranian and Indian Zoroastrian communities. The Parsis played a significant role in the modernization of Iran, particularly in the 20th century. They served as a reminder of Iran's ancient heritage, which was crucial to Iranians. The Parsis also demonstrated to Iranians that it was possible to be both modern and culturally authentic, and that the revival of Zoroastrianism could be a way of modernizing Iranian culture while retaining its original identity.

Both Reza Shah and Muhammad Reza Shah played an active role in encouraging Parsis to invest in Iran and contribute to its economic development by inviting them to return to their homeland. During the Pahlavi dynasty in Iran, the relationship between Zoroastrianism and Iranian national identity was blurred. This was exemplified by Reza Shah's adoption of Zoroastrian calendar names and placement of the Fravahar symbol on prominent government buildings. Additionally, he maintained a close relationship with the Zoroastrian parliamentary representative, Keikhosrow Shahrokh, who was entrusted by him with important governmental tasks.

Reza Shah was also sympathetic to Indian Zoroastrians (Parsis) and actively encouraged their return to Iran to invest and help develop the country's economy. In 1932, he invited Dinshah Irani, a Parsi leader and founder of the Iranian Zoroastrian Anjoman and the Iran League in India, to visit Iran as part of a Parsi delegation. Irani was awarded honours by Reza Shah and entrusted with a message to take back to the Parsi community in India.

You Parsis are as much the children of this soil as any other Iranis, and so you are as much entitled to have your proper share in its development as any other nationals.

We estimate Our Empire's resources to be even greater than those of America, and in tapping them you can take your proper part. We do not want you to come all bag and baggage; just wait a little and watch.

If you find the proposition beneficial both to yourselves and to this land, then do come and We shall greet you with open arms, as We might.

Our dear brothers and sisters.

Iran is a vast country pregnant with many advantages and fresh fields waiting for development. We suggest that the Parsis, who are still the sons of Iran, though separated from her, should look upon this country of to-day as their own, and differentiate it from its immediate past, and strive to derive benefit from her developments.

In the 1930s, Parsis discussed the idea of buying land in Iran to create a Parsi colony. Sir Hormusji C. Adenwala proposed raising funds in Bombay for this purpose, with support from the Iranian government and Reza Shah. Some Parsis had already resettled in Iran earlier since the time of Maneckji Hataria. The Iran League Quarterly provided information on legal and economic aspects of land purchase. Land near Bandar-e Shapur was suggested as particularly valuable due to government plans for the port. Similar plans were considered for other Parsi colonies in Iran, including Yazd and Kerman. Textile manufacturing was seen as a potential area for Parsi investment, leading to the establishment of the Khorsovi Textile Mill in Mashhad (based on joint Parsi and Iranian ownership agreements). There was also discussion of combining industrial and agricultural ventures in such colonies.

=== Other demographic statistics ===
As of 2001, the ratio of males to females was 1,000 males to 1,050 females (up from 1,024 in 1991), due primarily to the high median age of the population (elderly women are more common than elderly men), while the national average in India was 1,000 males to 933 females.

Parsis have a high literacy rate; as of 2001, the literacy rate is 99.1%, the highest of any Indian community (the national average was 78.5%). 97.1% of Parsis reside in urban areas (the national average is 27.8%). Parsis mother tongue is Gujarati or Marathi. In the Greater Mumbai area, where the density of Parsis is highest, about 13% of Parsi females and about 24% of Parsi males do not marry.

In 1891, according to the British Census, there was 89,904 Parsis in India, which were geographically distributed as the following: 47,458 in Bombay (52%), 5,893 in Surat, 4,452 in Navsari, 2,243 in Bharuch, 1,695 in Poona, 1,375 in Karachi, 726 in Bandra, 723 in Ahmedabad, 616 in Hyderabad, 582 in Baroda and 24,141 elsewhere (26%).

== History ==
=== Arrival in the Indian subcontinent ===
According to the Qissa-i Sanjan, the only existing account of the early years of Zoroastrian refugees in India composed at least six centuries after their tentative date of arrival, the first group of immigrants originated from Khorasan. This historical region of Central Asia is in part in northeastern Iran, where it constitutes modern Khorasan province, part of western/northern Afghanistan, and in part in three Central-Asian republics namely Tajikistan, Turkmenistan and Uzbekistan.

According to the Qissa, the immigrants were granted permission to stay by the local ruler, Jadi Rana, on the condition that they adopt the local language (Gujarati) and that their women adopt local dress (the sari). The refugees accepted the conditions and founded the settlement of Sanjan, which is said to have been named after the city of their origin (Sanjan, near Merv, modern Turkmenistan). This first group was followed by a second group from Greater Khorasan within five years of the first, and this time having religious implements with them (the alat). In addition to these Khorasanis or Kohistanis "mountain folk", as the two initial groups are said to have been initially called, at least one other group is said to have come overland from Sari, Iran.

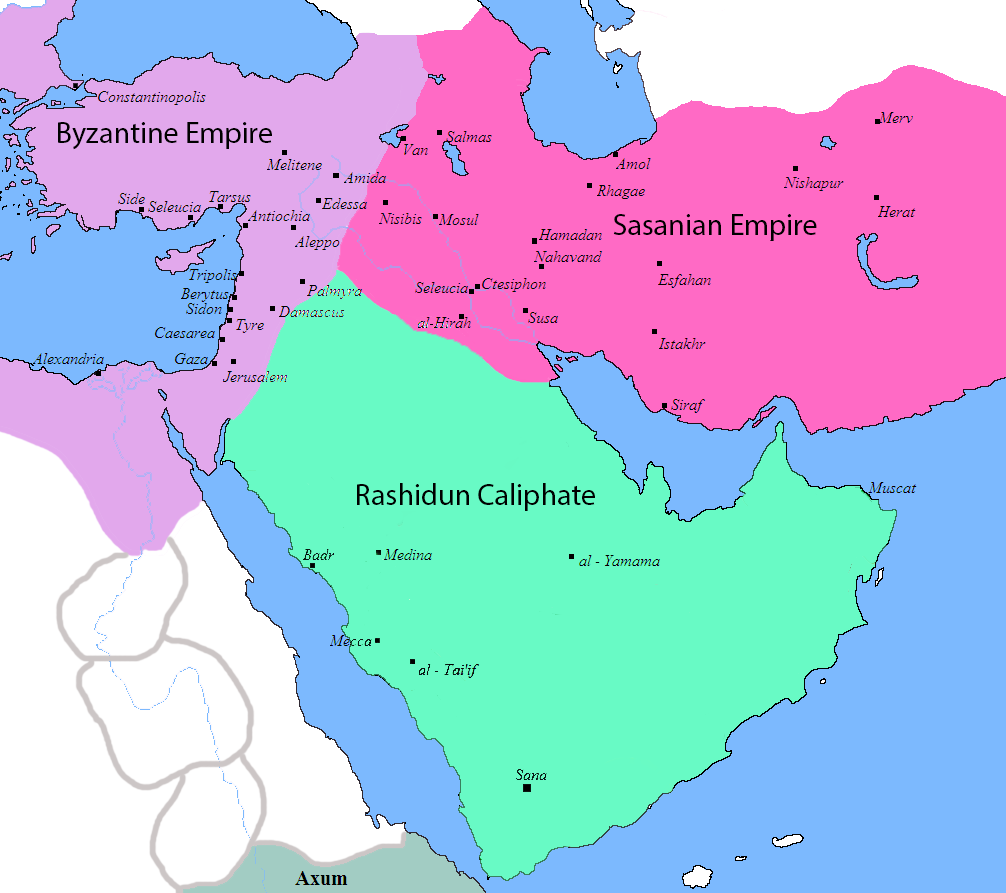
Map of the Sasanian Empire and its surrounding regions on the eve of the Muslim conquest of Persia

Although the Sanjan group are believed to have been the first permanent settlers, the precise date of their arrival is a matter of conjecture. All estimates are based on the Qissa, which is vague or contradictory with respect to some elapsed periods. Consequently, three possible dates – 716, 765, and 936 – have been proposed as the year of landing, and the disagreement has been the cause of "many an intense battle ... amongst Parsis". Since dates are not specifically mentioned in Parsi texts prior to the 18th century, any date of arrival is perforce a matter of speculation. The importance of the Qissa lies in any case not so much in its reconstruction of events than in its depiction of the Parsis – in the way they have come to view themselves – and in their relationship to the dominant culture. As such, the text plays a crucial role in shaping Parsi identity. But, "even if one comes to the conclusion that the chronicle based on verbal transmission is not more than a legend, it still remains without doubt an extremely informative document for Parsee historiography."

The Sanjan Zoroastrians were certainly not the first Zoroastrians on the subcontinent. Sindh touching Balochistan, the easternmost periphery of the Iranian world, too had once been under coastal administration of the Sasanian Empire (224–651), which consequently maintained outposts there. Even following the loss of Sindh, the Iranians continued to play a major role in the trade links between the east and west. The 9th-century Arab historiographer Al-Masudi briefly notes Zoroastrians with fire temples in al-Hind and in al-Sindh. There is evidence of individual Parsis residing in Sindh in the tenth and twelfth centuries, but the current modern community is thought to date from British arrival in Sindh. Moreover, for the Iranians, the harbours of Gujarat lay on the maritime routes that complemented the overland Silk Road and there were extensive trade relations between the two regions. The contact between Iranians and Indians was already well established even prior to the Common Era, and both the Puranas and the Mahabharata use the term Parasikas to refer to the peoples west of the Indus River.

"Parsi legends regarding their ancestors' migration to India depict a beleaguered band of religious refugees escaping the new rule post the Muslim conquests in order to preserve their ancient faith." However, while Parsi settlements definitely arose along the western coast of the Indian subcontinent following the Arab conquest of Iran, it is not possible to state with certainty that these migrations occurred as a result of religious persecution against Zoroastrians. If the "traditional" 8th century date (as deduced from the Qissa) is considered valid, it must be assumed "that the migration began while Zoroastrianism was still the predominant religion in Iran and economic factors predominated the initial decision to migrate." This would have been particularly the case if – as the Qissa suggests – the first Parsis originally came from the north-east (i.e. Central Asia) and had previously been dependent on Silk Road trade. Even so, in the 17th century, Henry Lord, a chaplain with the English East India Company, noted that the Parsis came to India seeking "liberty of conscience" but simultaneously arrived as "merchantmen bound for the shores of India, in course of trade and merchandise."

=== Early years ===
The Qissa has little to say about the events that followed the establishment of Sanjan, and restricts itself to a brief note on the establishment of the "Fire of Victory" (Middle Persian: Atash Bahram) at Sanjan and its subsequent move to Navsari. According to Dhalla, the next several centuries were "full of hardships" (sic) before Zoroastrianism "gained a real foothold in India and secured for its adherents some means of livelihood in this new country of their adoption".

Two centuries after their landing, the Parsis began to settle in other parts of Gujarat, which led to "difficulties in defining the limits of priestly jurisdiction". These problems were resolved by 1290 through the division of Gujarat into five panthaks (districts), each under the jurisdiction of one priestly family and their descendants. (Continuing disputes regarding jurisdiction over the Atash Bahram led to the fire being moved to Udvada in 1742, where today jurisdiction is shared in rotation among the five panthak families.)

Inscriptions at the Kanheri Caves near Mumbai suggest that at least until the early 11th century, Middle Persian was still the literary language of the hereditary Zoroastrian priesthood. Nonetheless, aside from the Qissa and the Kanheri inscriptions, there is little evidence of the Parsis until the 12th and 13th century, when "masterly" Sanskrit translations and transcriptions of the Avesta and its commentaries began to be prepared. From these translations Dhalla infers that "religious studies were prosecuted with great zeal at this period" and that the command of Middle Persian and Sanskrit among the clerics "was of a superior order".

From the 13th century to the late 16th century, the Zoroastrian priests of Gujarat sent (in all) twenty-two requests for religious guidance to their co-religionists in Iran, presumably because they considered the Iranian Zoroastrians "better informed on religious matters than themselves, and must have preserved the old-time tradition more faithfully than they themselves did". These transmissions and their replies – assiduously preserved by the community as the rivayats (epistles) – span the years 1478–1766 and deal with both religious and social subjects. From a superficial 21st century point of view, some of these ithoter ("questions") are remarkably trivial – for instance, Rivayat 376: whether ink prepared by a non-Zoroastrian is suitable for copying Avestan language texts – but they provide a discerning insight into the fears and anxieties of the early modern Zoroastrians. Thus, the question of the ink is symptomatic of the fear of assimilation and the loss of identity, a theme that dominates the questions posed and continues to be an issue into the 21st century. So also the question of conversion of Juddins (non-Zoroastrians) to Zoroastrianism, to which the reply (R237, R238) was: acceptable, even meritorious.

Nonetheless, "the precarious condition in which they lived for a considerable period made it impracticable for them to keep up their former proselytizing zeal. The instinctive fear of disintegration and absorption in the vast multitudes among whom they lived created in them a spirit of exclusiveness and a strong desire to preserve the racial characteristics and distinctive features of their community. Living in an atmosphere surcharged with the Hindu caste system, they felt that their own safety lay in encircling their fold by rigid caste barriers". Even so, at some point (possibly shortly after their arrival in India), the Zoroastrians – perhaps determining that the social stratification that they had brought with them was unsustainable in the small community – did away with all but the hereditary priesthood (called the asronih in Sassanid Iran). The remaining estates – the (r)atheshtarih (nobility, soldiers, and civil servants), vastaryoshih (farmers and herdsmen), hutokshih (artisans and labourers) – were folded into an all-comprehensive class today known as the behdini ("followers of daena", for which "good religion" is one translation). This change would have far reaching consequences. For one, it opened the gene pool to some extent since until that time inter-class marriages were exceedingly rare (this would continue to be a problem for the priesthood until the 20th century). For another, it did away with the boundaries along occupational lines, a factor that would endear the Parsis to the 18th- and 19th-century colonial authorities who had little patience for the unpredictable complications of the Hindu caste system (such as when a clerk from one caste would not deal with a clerk from another).

=== Age of opportunity ===
Following the commercial treaty in the early 17th century between Mughal emperor Jahangir and James I of England, the East India Company obtained the exclusive rights to reside and build factories in Surat and other areas. Many Parsis, who until then had been living in farming communities throughout Gujarat, moved to the English-run settlements to take the new jobs offered. In 1668 the English East India Company leased the Seven Islands of Bombay from Charles II of England. The company found the deep harbour on the east coast of the islands to be ideal for setting up their first port in the sub-continent, and in 1687 they transferred their headquarters from Surat to the fledgling settlement. The Parsis followed and soon began to occupy posts of trust in connection with government and public works.

Where literacy had previously been the exclusive domain of the priesthood, in the era of the British Raj, the British schools in India provided the new Parsi youth with the means not only to learn to read and write but also to be educated in the greater sense of the term and become familiar with the quirks of the British establishment. These capabilities were enormously useful to Parsis since they allowed them to "represent themselves as being like the British," which they did "more diligently and effectively than perhaps any other South Asian community". While the colonial authorities often saw the other Indians "as passive, ignorant, irrational, outwardly submissive but inwardly guileful", the Parsis were seen to have the traits that the authorities tended to ascribe to themselves. Johan Albrecht de Mandelslo (1638) saw them as "diligent", "conscientious", and "skillful" in their mercantile pursuits. Similar observations would be made by James Mackintosh, Recorder of Bombay from 1804 to 1811, who noted that "the Parsees are a small remnant of one of the mightiest nations of the ancient world, who, flying from persecution into India, were for many ages lost in obscurity and poverty, till at length they met a just government under which they speedily rose to be one of the most popular mercantile bodies in Asia".

One of these was an enterprising agent named Rustom Maneck. In 1702, Maneck, who had probably already amassed a fortune under the Dutch and Portuguese, was appointed the first broker to the East India Company (acquiring the name "Seth" in the process), and in the following years "he and his Parsi associates widened the occupational and financial horizons of the larger Parsi community". Thus, by the mid-18th century, the brokerage houses of the Bombay Presidency were almost all in Parsi hands. As James Forbes, the Collector of Broach (now Bharuch), would note in his Oriental Memoirs (1770): "many of the principal merchants and owners of ships at Bombay and Surat are Parsees." "Active, robust, prudent and persevering, they now form a very valuable part of the Company's subjects on the western shores of Hindustan where they are highly esteemed".In the 18th century, Parsis with their skills in ship building and trade greatly benefited with trade between India and China. The trade was mainly in timber, silk, cotton and opium. For example Jamsetjee Jejeebhoy acquired most of his wealth through trade in cotton and opium Gradually certain families "acquired wealth and prominence (Sorabji, Modi, Cama, Wadia, Jeejeebhoy, Readymoney, Dadyseth, Petit, Patel, Mehta, Allbless, Tata, etc.), many of which would be noted for their participation in the public life of the city, and for their various educational, industrial, and charitable enterprises.").

Through his largesse, Maneck helped establish the infrastructure that was necessary for the Parsis to set themselves up in Bombay and in doing so "established Bombay as the primary centre of Parsi habitation and work in the 1720s". Following the political and economic isolation of Surat in the 1720s and 1730s that resulted from troubles between the (remnant) Mughal authorities and the increasingly dominant Marathas, a number of Parsi families from Surat migrated to the new city. While in 1700 "fewer than a handful of individuals appear as merchants in any records; by mid-century, Parsis engaged in commerce constituted one of important commercial groups in Bombay". Maneck's generosity is incidentally also the first documented instance of Parsi philanthropy. In 1689, Anglican chaplain John Ovington reported that in Surat the family "assist the poor and are ready to provide for the sustenance and comfort of such as want it. Their universal kindness, either employing such as are ready and able to work, or bestowing a seasonable bounteous charity to such as are infirm and miserable, leave no man destitute of relief, nor suffer a beggar in all their tribe".

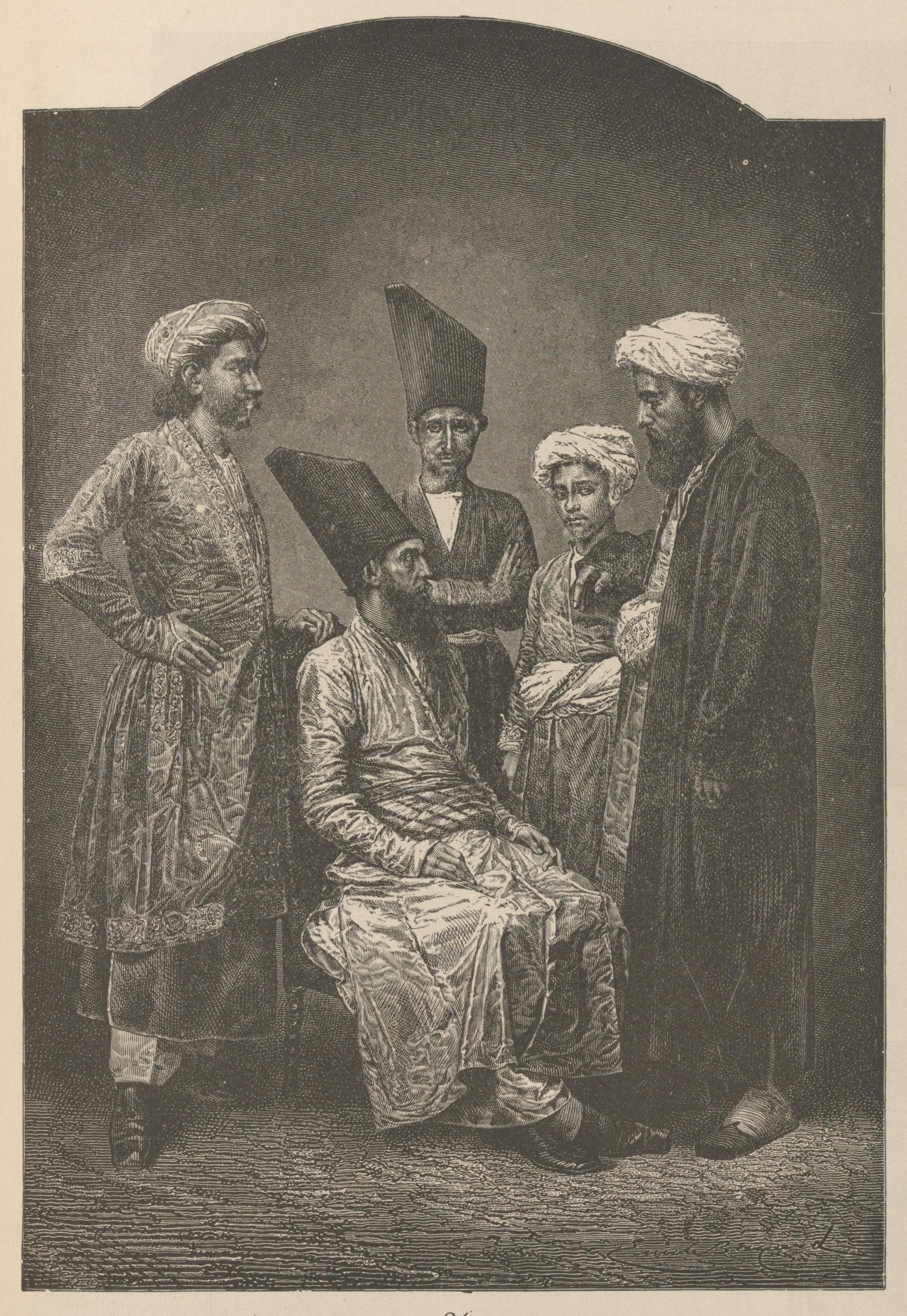
"Parsis of Bombay" a wood engraving, ca. 1878

In 1728 Rustom's eldest son Naoroz (later Naorojee) founded the Bombay Parsi Panchayet (in the sense of an instrument for self-governance and not in the sense of the trust it is today) to assist newly arriving Parsis in religious, social, legal and financial matters. Using their vast resources, the Maneck Seth family gave their time, energy and not inconsiderable financial resources to the Parsi community, with the result that by the mid-18th century, the Panchayat was the accepted means for Parsis to cope with the exigencies of urban life and the recognized instrument for regulating the affairs of the community. Nonetheless, by 1838 the Panchayat was under attack for impropriety and nepotism. In 1855 the Bombay Times noted that the Panchayat was utterly without the moral or legal authority to enforce its statutes (the Bundobusts or codes of conduct) and the council soon ceased to be considered representative of the community. In the wake of a July 1856 ruling by the Judicial Committee of the Privy Council that it had no jurisdiction over the Parsis in matters of marriage and divorce, the Panchayat was reduced to little more than a Government-recognized "Parsi Matrimonial Court". Although the Panchayat would eventually be reestablished as the administrator of community property, it ultimately ceased to be an instrument for self-governance.

At about the same time as the role of the Panchayat was declining, a number of other institutions arose that would replace the Panchayat's role in contributing to the sense of social cohesiveness that the community desperately sought. By the mid-19th century, the Parsis were keenly aware that their numbers were declining and saw education as a possible solution to the problem. In 1842 Jamsetjee Jejeebhoy established the Parsi Benevolent Fund with the aim of improving, through education, the condition of the impoverished Parsis still living in Surat and its environs. In 1849 the Parsis established their first school (co-educational, which was a novelty at the time, but would soon be split into separate schools for boys and girls) and the education movement quickened. The number of Parsi schools multiplied, but other schools and colleges were also freely attended. Accompanied by better education and social cohesiveness, the community's sense of distinctiveness grew, and in 1854 Dinshaw Maneckji Petit founded the Persian Zoroastrian Amelioration Fund with the aim of improving conditions for his less fortunate co-religionists in Iran. The fund succeeded in convincing a number of Iranian Zoroastrians to emigrate to India (where they are known today as Iranis) and the efforts of its emissary Maneckji Limji Hataria were instrumental in obtaining a remission of the jizya for their co-religionists in 1882.

In the 18th and 19th centuries, the Parsis had emerged as "the foremost people in India in matters educational, industrial, and social. They came in the vanguard of progress, amassed vast fortunes, and munificently gave away large sums in charity". Near the end of the 19th century, the total number of Parsis in colonial India was 85,397, of which 48,507 lived in Bombay, constituting around 6.7% of the total population of the city, according to the 1881 census. This would be the last time that the Parsis would be considered a numerically significant minority in the city.

Nonetheless, the legacy of the 19th century was a sense of self-awareness as a community. The typically Parsi cultural symbols of the 17th and 18th centuries such as language (a Parsi variant of Gujarati), arts, crafts, and sartorial habits developed into Parsi theatre, literature, newspapers, magazines, and schools. The Parsis now ran community medical centres, ambulance corps, Scouting troops, clubs, and Masonic Lodges. They had their own charitable foundations, housing estates, legal institutions, courts, and governance. They were no longer weavers and petty merchants, but now were established and ran banks, mills, heavy industry, shipyards, and shipping companies. Moreover, even while maintaining their own cultural identity they did not fail to recognise themselves as nationally Indian, as Dadabhai Naoroji, the first Asian to occupy a seat in the British Parliament would note: "Whether I am a Hindu, a Mohammedan, a Parsi, a Christian, or of any other creed, I am above all an Indian. Our country is India; our nationality is Indian". While having an outsized role in the Indian independence movement, the majority of Parsis opposed the partition of undivided India.

=== Indian Air Force Service ===
Parsis have made significant contributions to India's defence services, particularly the Indian Air Force. Notable officers such as Air Vice Marshal Minoo Merwan Engineer, Air Marshal Aspy Engineer, and Air VMarshal Adi Rustom Ghandhi exemplify the community's presence across ranks, from combat pilots to senior leadership. The cultural symbolism of the Faravahar, associated with Zoroastrianism, has been metaphorically linked to the community's affinity for flight.

== Change in religious education ==
In the 1860s and 1870s, the linguist Martin Haug interpreted Zoroastrian scripture in Christian terms, and compared the yazatas to the angels of Christianity. In this scheme, the Amesha Spentas are the arch-angel retinue of Ahura Mazda, with the hamkars as the supporting host of lesser angels.

At the time Haug wrote his translations, the Parsi (i.e. Indian Zoroastrian) community was under intense pressure from English and American missionaries, who severely criticized the Zoroastrians for—as John Wilson portrayed it in 1843—"polytheism", which the missionaries argued was of much lesser worth than their own "monotheism". At the time, Zoroastrianism lacked theologians of its own, and so the Zoroastrians were poorly equipped to make their own case. In this situation, Haug's counter-interpretation came as a welcome relief, and was (by-and-large) gratefully accepted as legitimate.

Haug's interpretations were subsequently disseminated as Zoroastrian ones, which then eventually reached the west where they were seen to corroborate Haug. Like most of Haug's interpretations, this comparison is today so well entrenched that a gloss of 'yazata' as 'angel' is almost universally accepted; both in publications intended for a general audience as well as in (non-philological) academic literature.

The migration of Parsis to India caused a lack of religious knowledge, which led to doubts in several matters, which made them send men to Iran during the Muslim rule in order to learn the religion from the Zoroastrians in Iran. However, according to the orientalist Arthur Christensen and several Arab historians, the Zoroastrian doctrine changed after the fall of the Sassanid state because the Zoroastrian clerics tried to save their religion from extinction by modifying it to resemble the religion of the Muslims. So that the Zoroastrians would not have a reason to convert to Islam, but this did not succeed in preventing the Zoroastrians from converting to Islam, and it also caused the emergence of a new version of Zoroastrianism that resembled Islam and differed from Zoroastrianism in the Sassanid era.

The main components of Zoroastrianism as practiced by the Parsi community are the concepts of purity and pollution (nasu), initiation (navjot), daily prayers, worship at Fire Temples, marriage, funerals, and general worship via practicing good thoughts, words and deeds.

== Religious practices ==
=== Purity and pollution ===
The balance between good and evil is correlated to the idea of purity and pollution. Purity is held to be of the very essence of godliness. Pollution's very point is to destroy purity through the death of a human. In order to adhere to purity it is the duty of Parsis to continue to preserve purity within their body as God created them. A Zoroastrian priest spends his entire life dedicated to following a holy life.

=== Fasting ===
Fasting in Zoroastrianism is considered forbidden because it weakens the body and that is sin in Zoroastrianism, and many followers hate fasting, but the Parsees were influenced by the Hindus, who took the idea of fasting at a funeral.

=== Navjote ===
Zoroastrians are not initiated by infant baptism. Children are initiated into the faith when they are old enough to recite some required prayers along with the priest at the time of the navjote ceremony, ideally before they reach puberty. Though there is no actual age by which a child must be initiated into the faith (preferably after seven years), Navjote cannot be performed on an adult. While the Parsi traditionally do not do adult Navjote (except in cases where it is performed for descendants of Parsi wanting to join the faith), the Iranian Zoroastrian equivalent, the sedreh-pushti can be done at any age for those wanting to convert.

The initiation begins with a ritual bath, then a spiritual cleansing prayer; the child changes into white pajama pants, a shawl, and a small cap. Following introductory prayers, the child is given the sacred items that are associated with Zoroastrianism: a sacred shirt and cord, sudre, and kusti. The child then faces the main priest and fire is brought in to represent God. Once the priest finishes with the prayers, the child's initiation is complete and he or she has become part of the community and religion.

=== Marriage ===
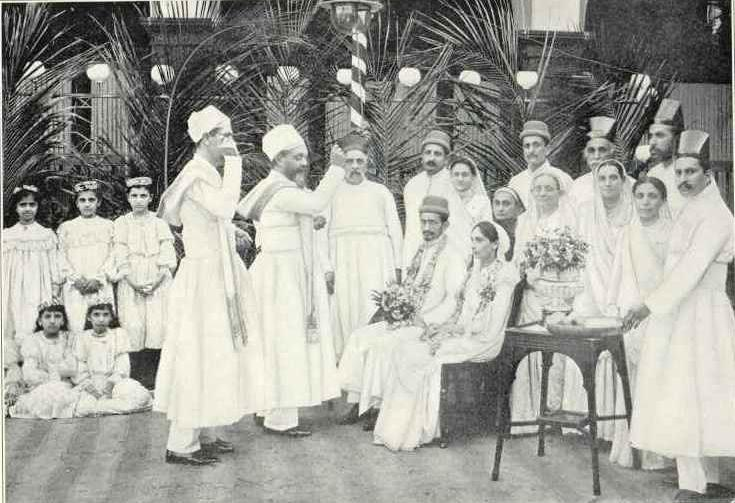
Parsi wedding, 1905

Marriage is very important to the members of the Parsi community, believing that in order to continue the expansion of God's kingdom they must procreate. Up until the mid-19th century child marriages were common even though the idea of child marriage was not part of the religious doctrine. Consequently, when social reform started happening in India, the Parsi community discontinued the practice. There are, however, rising problems over the availability of brides. More and more women in the Parsi community are becoming well educated and are therefore either delaying marriage or not partaking at all. Women within the Parsi community in India are 97% literate; 42% have completed high school or college and 29% have an occupation in which they earn a substantial amount of money. The wedding ceremony begins much like the initiation with a cleansing bath. The bride and groom then travel to the wedding in florally decorated cars. The priests from both families facilitate the wedding. The couple begin by facing one another with a sheet to block their view of each another. Wool is passed over the two seven times to bind them together. The two are then supposed to throw rice to their partner symbolizing dominance. The religious element comes in next when the two sit side by side to face the priest.

=== Funerals ===
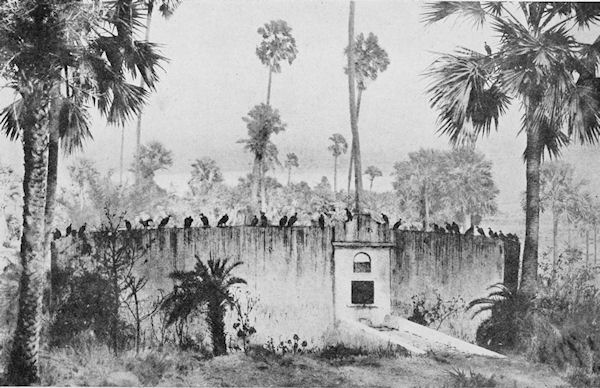
Parsi Tower of Silence, Bombay

The pollution that is associated with death has to be handled carefully. A separate part of the home is designated to house the corpse for funeral proceedings before being taken away. The priest comes to say prayers that are for the cleansing of sins and to affirm the faith of the deceased. Fire is brought to the room and prayers are begun. The body is washed and inserted clean within a sudre and kusti. The ceremony then begins, and a circle is drawn around the body into which only the bearers may enter. As they proceed to the cemetery they walk in pairs and are connected by white fabric. A dog is essential in the funeral process because it is able to see death. The body is taken to the tower of death where the vultures feed on it. Once the bones are bleached by the sun they are pushed into the circular opening in the centre. The mourning process is four days long, and rather than creating graves for the dead, charities are established in honour of the person.

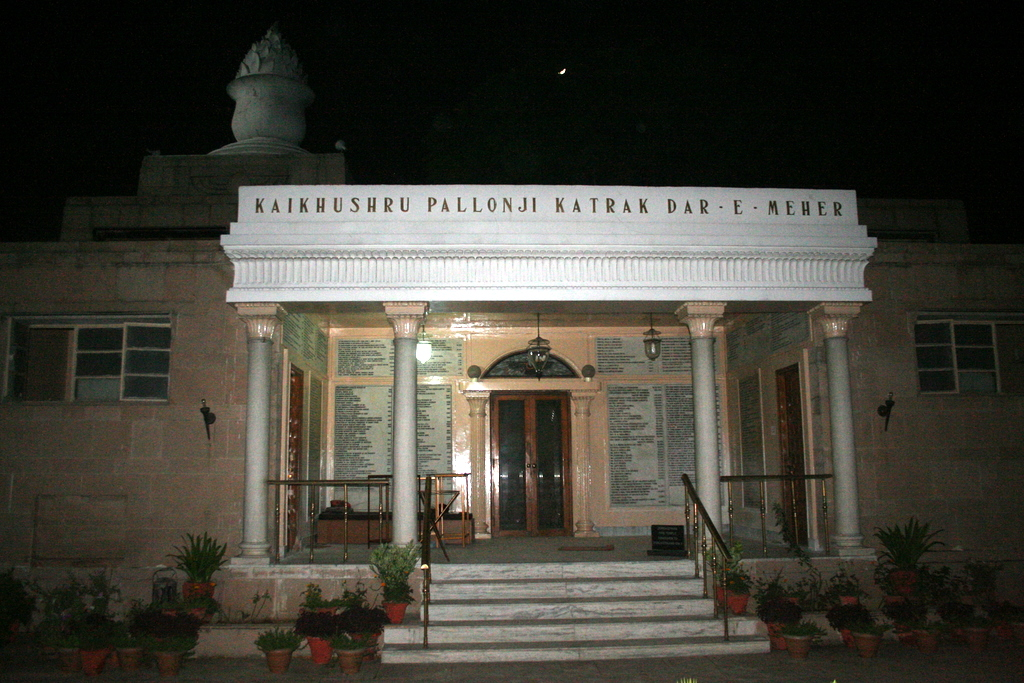
Parsi Fire Temple Delhi

=== Temples ===
Parsi Fire Temple of Ahmedabad, India

Zoroastrian festivals were originally held outside in the open air; temples were not common until later. Most of the temples were built by wealthy Parsis who needed centres that housed purity. As stated before, fire is considered to represent the presence of Ahura Mazda, and there are two distinct differences for the types of fire for the different temples. The first type of temple is the Atash Behram, which is the highest level of fire. The fire is prepared for an entire year before it can be installed, and once it is, it is cared for to the highest possible degree. There are only eight such temples located within India. The second type of fire temple is called a Dar-i Mihr, and the preparation process is not as intense. There are about 160 of these located throughout India.

== Factions within the community ==
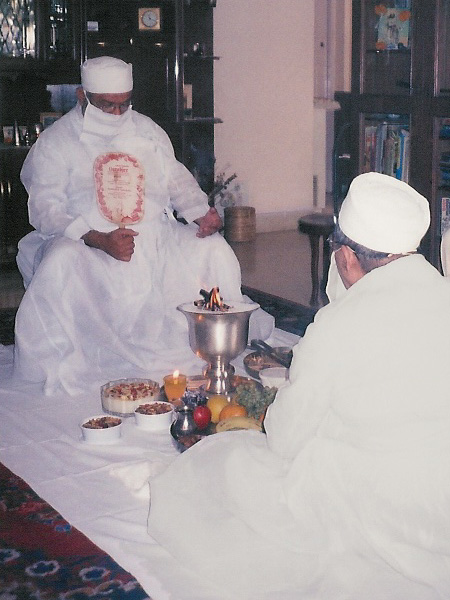
Parsi Jashan ceremony (in this case, a house blessing)

=== Calendrical differences ===
Until about the 12th century, all Zoroastrians followed the same 365-day religious calendar, which had remained largely unmodified since the calendar reforms of Ardashir I (r. 226–241 AD). Since that calendar did not compensate for the fractional days that go to make up a full solar year, with time it was no longer accordant with the seasons.

Sometime between 1125 and 1250 (cf. Boyce 1970, p. 537), the Parsis inserted an embolismic month to level out the accumulating fractional days. However, the Parsis were the only Zoroastrians to do so (and did it only once), with the result that, from then on, the calendar in use by the Parsis and the calendar in use by Zoroastrians elsewhere diverged by a matter of thirty days. The calendars still had the same name, Shahenshahi (imperial), presumably because none were aware that the calendars were no longer the same.

In 1745 the Parsis in and around Surat switched to the Kadmi or Kadimi calendar on the recommendation of their priests who were convinced that the calendar in use in the ancient homeland must be correct. Moreover, they denigrated the Shahenshahi calendar as being "royalist".

In 1906 attempts to bring the two factions together resulted in the introduction of a third calendar based on an 11th-century Seljuk model: the Fasili, or Fasli, calendar had leap days intercalated every four years and it had a New Year's day that fell on the day of the vernal equinox. Although it was the only calendar always in harmony with the seasons, most members of the Parsi community rejected it on the grounds that it was not in accord with the injunctions expressed in Zoroastrian tradition (Dēnkard 3.419).

Today the majority of Parsis are adherents of the Parsi version of the Shahenshahi calendar although the Kadmi calendar does have its adherents among the Parsi communities of Surat and Bharuch. The Fasli calendar does not have a significant following among Parsis, but, by virtue of being compatible with the Bastani calendar (an Iranian development with the same salient features as the Fasli calendar), it is predominant among the Zoroastrians of Iran.

==== Effect of the calendar disputes ====
Since some of the Avesta prayers contain references to the names of the months, and some other prayers are used only at specific times of the year, the issue of which calendar is "correct" also has theological ramifications.

To further complicate matters, in the late 18th century (or early 19th century) a highly influential head-priest and staunch proponent of the Kadmi calendar, Phiroze Kaus Dastur of the Dadyseth Atash-Behram in Bombay, became convinced that the pronunciation of prayers as recited by visitors from Iran was correct, while the pronunciation as used by the Parsis was not. He accordingly went on to alter some (but not all) of the prayers, which in due course came to be accepted by all adherents of the Kadmi calendar as the more ancient (and thus presumably correct). However, scholars of Avestan language and linguistics attribute the difference in pronunciation to a vowel-shift that occurred only in Iran and that the Iranian pronunciation as adopted by the Kadmis is actually more recent than the pronunciation used by the non-Kadmi Parsis.

The calendar disputes were not always purely academic, either. In the 1780s, emotions over the controversy ran so high that violence occasionally erupted. In 1783 a Shahenshahi resident of Bharuch named Homaji Jamshedji was sentenced to death for kicking a young Kadmi woman and so causing her to miscarry.

Of the eight Atash-Behrams (the highest grade of fire temple) in India, three follow the Kadmi pronunciation and calendar, the other five are Shahenshahi. The Fassalis do not have their own Atash-Behram.

=== Ilm-e-Khshnoom ===
The Ilm-e-Kshnoom ('science of ecstasy', or 'science of bliss') is a school of Parsi-Zoroastrian philosophy based on a mystic and esoteric, rather than literal, interpretation of religious texts. According to adherents of the sect, they are followers of the Zoroastrian faith as preserved by a clan of 2,000 individuals called the Saheb-e-Dilan ('Masters of the Heart') who are said to live in complete isolation in the mountainous recesses of the Caucasus (alternatively, in the Alborz range, around Mount Damavand).

There are few obvious indications that a Parsi might be a follower of the Kshnoom. Although their Kusti prayers are very similar to those used by the Fassalis, like the rest of the Parsi community the followers of Kshnoom are divided with respect to which calendar they observe. There are also other minor differences in their recitation of the liturgy, such as repetition of some sections of the longer prayers. Nonetheless, the Kshnoom are extremely conservative in their ideology and prefer isolation even with respect to other Parsis.

The largest community of followers of the Kshnoom lives in Jogeshwari, a suburb of Bombay, where they have their own fire temple (Behramshah Nowroji Shroff Daremeher), their own housing colony (Behram Baug) and their own newspaper (Parsi Pukar). There is a smaller concentration of adherents in Surat, where the sect was founded in the last decades of the 19th century.

=== Issues relating to the deceased ===
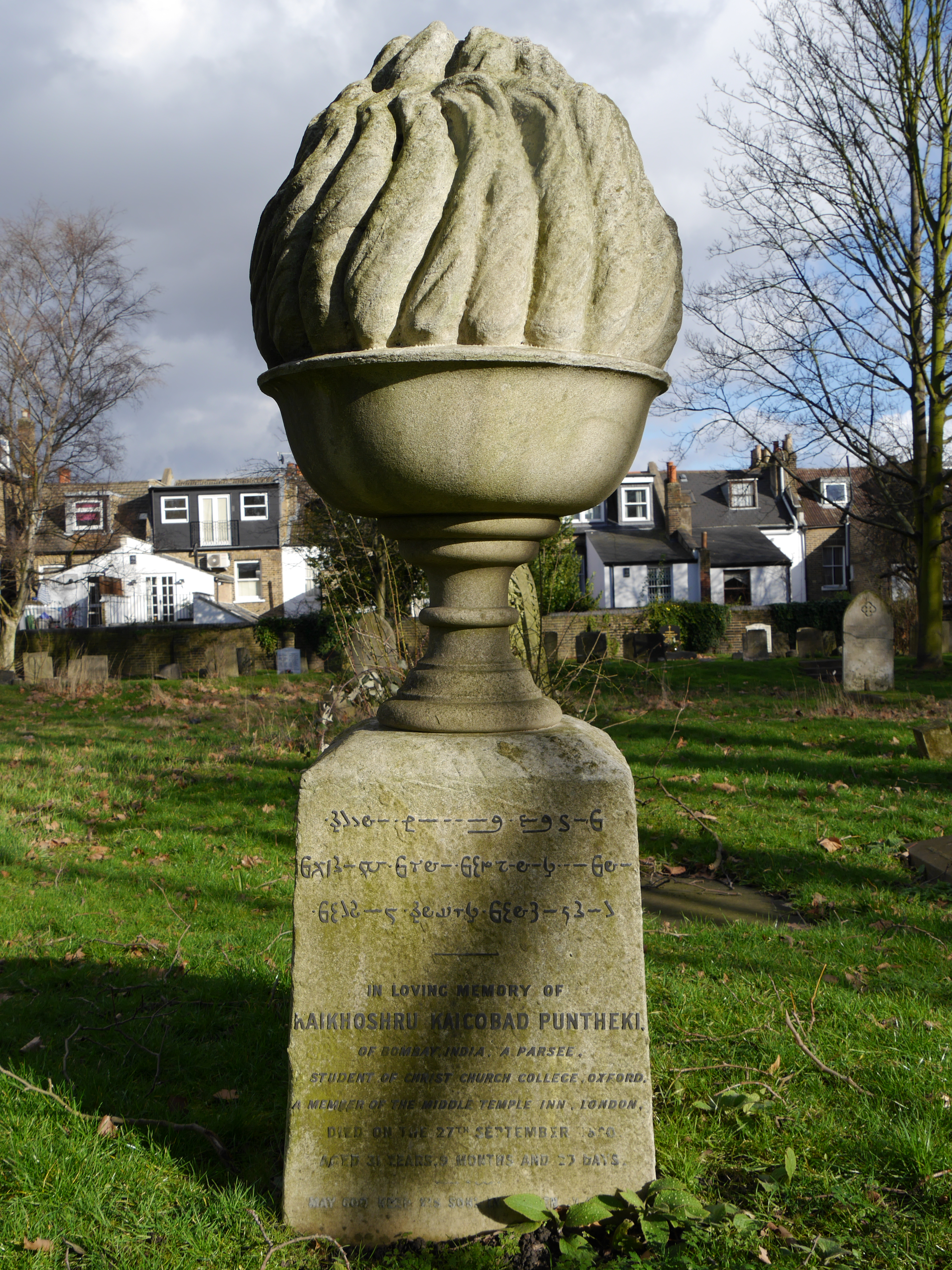
Parsi funerary monument, St Mary's Cemetery, Wandsworth

It has been traditional, in Mumbai and Karachi at least, for dead Parsis to be taken to the Towers of Silence where the corpses are quickly eaten by the city's vultures. The reason given for this practice is that earth, fire, and water are considered sacred elements which should not be defiled by the dead. Therefore, burial and cremation have always been prohibited in Parsi culture. However, in modern day Mumbai and Karachi the population of vultures has drastically reduced due to extensive urbanization and the unintended consequence of treating humans and livestock with antibiotics, and the anti-inflammatory diclofenac, which harm vultures and have led to the Indian vulture crisis. As a result, the bodies of the deceased are taking much longer to decompose. Solar panels have been installed in the Towers of Silence to speed up the decomposition process, but this has been only partially successful especially during monsoons. In Peshawar, a Parsi graveyard was established in the late 19th century, which still exists; this cemetery is unique as there is no Tower of Silence. Nevertheless, the majority of Parsis still use the traditional method of disposing of their loved ones and consider this as the last act of charity by the deceased on earth.

The Tower of Silence in Mumbai is located at Doongerwadi at Malabar Hill. In Karachi, the Tower of Silence is located in Parsi Colony, near the Chanesar Goth and Mehmoodabad localities.

== Archaeogenetics ==
Genealogical DNA tests have brought mixed results. Some studies support the Parsi contention that they have maintained their Persian roots by avoiding intermarriage with local populations.

A study published in Genome Biology based on high density SNP data has shown that the Parsis are genetically closer to Iranian populations than to their South Asian neighbours. They also share the highest number of haplotypes with present-day Iranians; the admixture of the Parsis with Indian populations was estimated to have occurred approximately 1,200 years ago. It is also found that Parsis are genetically closer to Neolithic Iranians than to modern Iranians who had recently received some genes from the Near East.

In that 2002 study of the Y-chromosome (patrilineal) DNA of the Parsis of Pakistan, it was determined that Parsis are genetically closer to Iranians than to their neighbours. A 2023 study was the first to delve deeply into maternal ancestry with high-resolution mitochondrial markers. They conducted a detailed phylogenetic analysis to infer their maternal genetic affinity. This revealed the Parsi mitogenomes, characterized by the mtDNA haplogroup M3a1 + 204, share a clade with both Middle Eastern and South Asian modern individuals in both the Maximum Likelihood tree and Bayesian phylogenetic tree. This haplogroup was also prevalent among the medieval Swat valley population and was observed in two Roopkund A individuals. In the phylogenetic network, these samples share a haplotype with both South Asian and Middle Eastern samples. Thus, the maternal ancestry of the first Parsi settlers includes genetic components similar to South Asian and Middle Eastern populations.

In 2017, a research study discovered that Parsis exhibit a stronger genetic affinity with Neolithic Iranians than with modern Iranians, who have experienced more recent admixture from the Near East. The study also identified 48% of South-Asian-specific mitochondrial lineages in ancient samples, which could be attributed to the assimilation of local females during the initial settlement or may be representative of mitochondrial lineages that have become extinct in Iran. That would make the population genetics of Parsis about 3/4 Iranian and 1/4 Indian.

The genetic studies of Parsis of Pakistan show sharp contrast between genetic data obtained from mitochondrial DNA (mtDNA) and Y-chromosome DNA (Y-DNA), different from most populations. Historical records suggest that they had moved from Iran to India, first to Gujarat and then to Mumbai and Karachi. According to Y-DNA, they resemble the Iranian population, which supports historical records. When the mtDNA pool is compared to Iranians and Gujaratis (their putative parental populations), it contrasted Y-DNA data. Parsis have a high frequency of haplogroup M (55%), similar to Indians, which is just 1.7% in the combined Iranian sample. According to the research findings, there is a noticeable contrast between the maternal and paternal components of the Parsi population. Despite their small population size, the high diversity observed in both the Y-DNA and mtDNA lineages suggests that a strong drift effect is improbable. The studies suggest a male-mediated migration of Parsi ancestors from Iran to Gujarat where they admixed with the local female population during initial settlements, which ultimately resulted in loss of Iranian mtDNA.

The absence of lung cancer-related DNA mutational signals among Parsis both point to the community's distinctive non-smoking social practises, which have been practised for millennia. Additionally, Parsis have high prevalence of longevity as a genetic feature. Parsis have however been shown to have high rates of breast cancer, bladder cancer, glucose-6-phosphate dehydrogenase deficiency and Parkinson's disease.

== Notable Parsi people ==
D. L. Sheth, the former director of the Centre for the Study of Developing Societies (CSDS), lists Indian communities that constituted the middle class and were traditionally "urban and professional" (following professions such as doctors, lawyers, teachers, engineers, etc.) immediately after Indian partition in 1947. This list included the Kashmiri Pandits, the Nagar Brahmins from Gujarat, the Brahmins from Southern India, the Punjabi Khatris and Kayastha from northern India, the Chitpavans and CKPs from Maharashtra; Bengali Probasis and Bhadraloks, the Parsis, as well as the upper echelons of the Indian Muslim and Indian Christian communities throughout the country. According to Pavan K. Varma, "Education was a common thread that bound together this pan-Indian elite"; almost all of the members of these communities could read and write in English and were educated beyond regular schooling institutions.

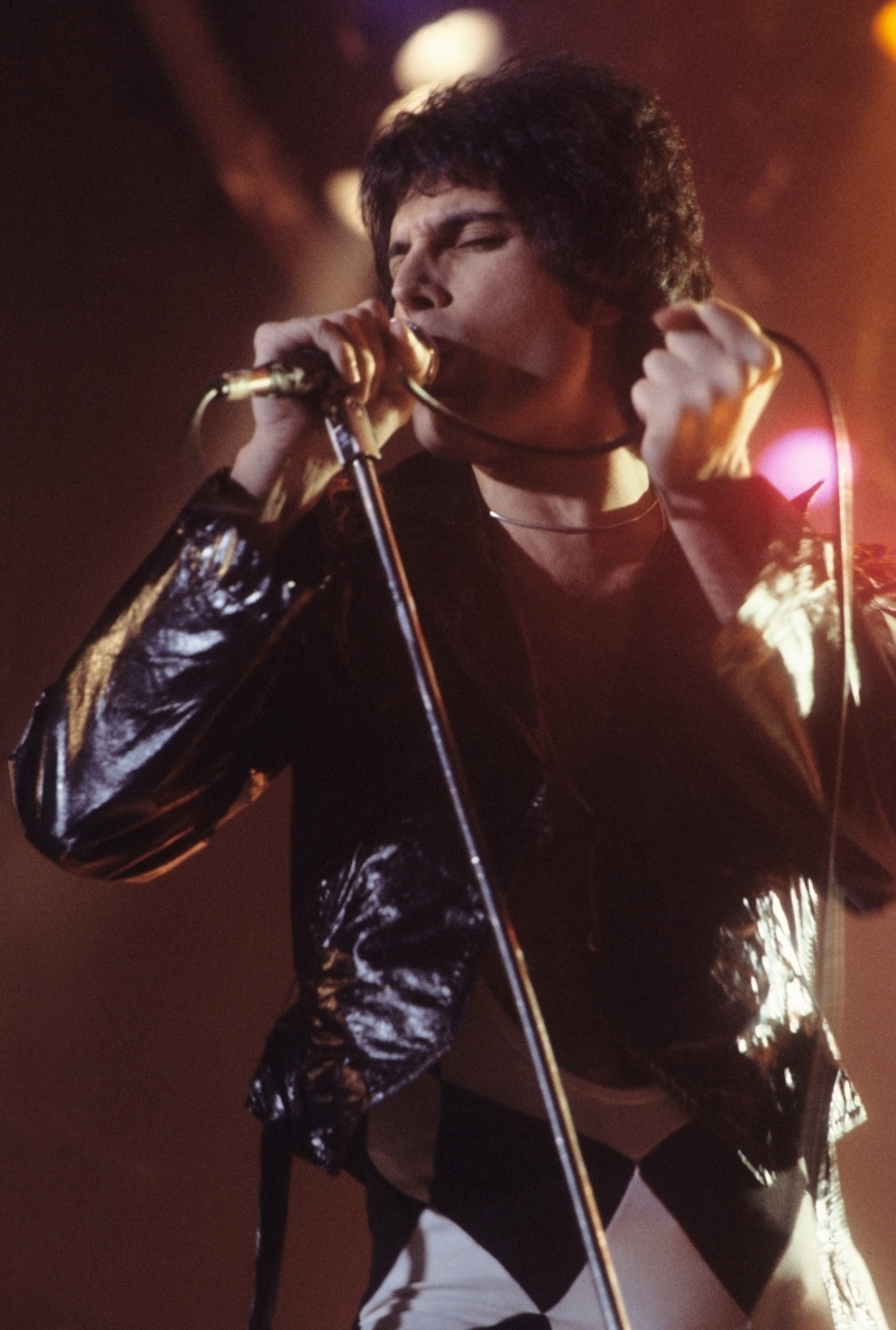
Freddie Mercury, lead singer of the rock band Queen

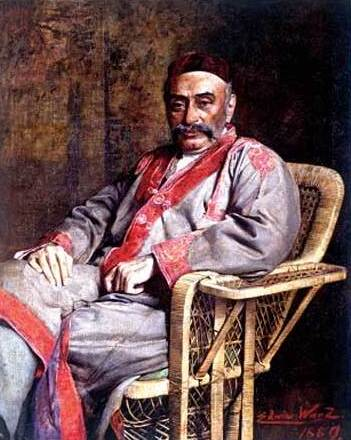
Jamsetji Tata, founder of Tata Group of companies.

The Parsis have made considerable contributions to the history and development of India. As the maxim "Parsi, thy name is charity" alludes to, their most prominent contribution is their philanthropy.

Although their people's name Parsi comes from the Persian-language word for a Persian person, in Sanskrit the term means "one who gives alms".

Mahatma Gandhi noted, "I am proud of my country, India, for having produced the splendid Zoroastrian stock, in numbers beneath contempt, but in charity and philanthropy perhaps unequaled and certainly unsurpassed." Several landmarks in Mumbai are named after Parsis, including Nariman Point. The Malabar Hill in Mumbai, is a home to several prominent Parsis. Parsis prominent in the Indian independence movement include Pherozeshah Mehta, Dadabhai Naoroji, and Bhikaiji Cama.

Particularly notable Parsis in the fields of science and industry include physicist Homi J. Bhabha, nuclear scientist Homi N. Sethna, industrialists J. R. D. Tata and Jamsetji Tata, regarded as the "Father of Indian Industry", and construction tycoon Pallonji Mistry. The families Godrej, Mistry family, Tata, Petit, Cowasjee, Poonawalla, and Wadia are important industrial Parsi families. Other notable Parsi business persons include Ratan Tata, Cyrus Mistry, Ratanji Dadabhoy Tata, Dinshaw Maneckji Petit, Ness Wadia, Neville Wadia, Jehangir Wadia and Nusli Wadia—all of them related through marriage to Muhammad Ali Jinnah, the founder of Pakistan. Mohammad Ali Jinnah's wife Rattanbai Petit, was born into two of the Parsi Petit–Tata families, and their daughter Dina Jinnah was married to Parsi industrialist Neville Wadia, the scion of the Wadia family. Other notable businessmen include Cyrus Poonawalla and his son Adar Poonawalla. The husband of Indian Prime Minister Indira Gandhi and son-in-law of Jawaharlal Nehru, Feroze Gandhi, was a Parsi with ancestral roots in Bharuch.

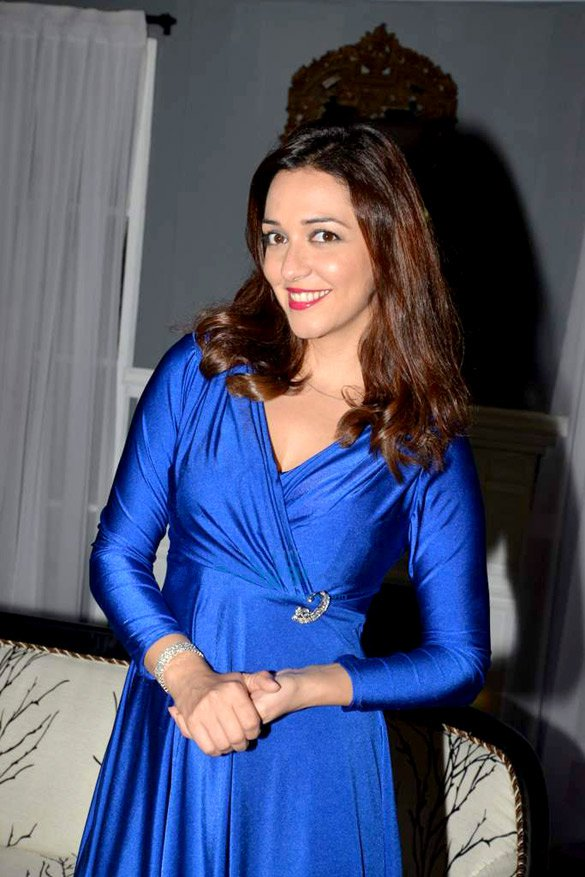
Nauheed Cyrusi, actress, model and VJ

The Parsi community has given India several distinguished military officers. Field Marshal Sam Manekshaw, Military Cross, was the first officer of the Indian Army to be appointed a Field Marshal. Admiral Jal Cursetji was the first Parsi to be appointed Chief of the Naval Staff of the Indian Navy. Air Marshal Aspy Engineer served as India's second Chief of Air Staff, post-independence, and Air Chief Marshal Fali Homi Major served as the 18th Chief of Air Staff. Vice Admiral RF Contractor served as the 17th Chief of the Indian Coast Guard. Lieutenant Colonel Ardeshir Burjorji Tarapore was killed in action in the 1965 Indo-Pakistan war and was posthumously awarded the Param Vir Chakra, India's highest military award for gallantry in action.

The Parsi community has produced several notable sports figures who have made significant contributions to their respective fields. In cricket, Nari Contractor, Rusi Modi, Farokh Engineer and Polly Umrigar were renowned for their exceptional skills and leadership. In music, rock musician Freddie Mercury; composer Kaikhosru Shapurji Sorabji; conductor Zubin Mehta.

In literature and journalism, they boast authors Rohinton Mistry, Firdaus Kanga, Bapsi Sidhwa, Ardashir Vakil, and investigative journalists Ardeshir Cowasjee, Russi Karanjia, and Behram Contractor. The film industry features screenwriter and photographer Sooni Taraporevala, actors Boman Irani, Erick Avari, actresses Nina Wadia and Persis Khambatta, and Thailand's cinematic pioneer Rattana Pestonji. Indian Architect Hafeez Contractor is also a Parsi.

Educational and legal achievements include educator Jamshed Bharucha, suffragist, cultural studies theorist Homi K. Bhabha, and first female barrister Mithan Jamshed Lam, Pakistan's first Parsi Supreme Court Justice Dorab Patel, and constitutional experts Fali S. Nariman and Nani Ardeshir Palkhivala, along with former Attorney-General of India Soli Sorabjee, and Supreme Court Justice Rohinton F. Nariman, India's first female photojournalist, Homai Vyarawalla, also hails from this community, as does Naxalite leader and intellectual Kobad Ghandy.

=== Portrayals in fictional works ===
In the Perveen Mistry Investigations series of mystery/crime novels by American author Sujata Massey, the novels' primary protagonist, the first female lawyer in 1920s Bombay, is a member of the city's Parsi community. Her Parsi background is often woven in as an element of the story's plot.

== See also ==
- Achaemenid conquest of the Indus Valley
- Kingdom of Awadh
- Battle of Sanjan
- Battle of Variav
- Religion in India
- Iranis (India)
- Religion in Iran
- Kartir
- Persecution of Buddhists by Zoroastrians
- Freddie Mercury § Early life
