= Qissa-i Sanjan =

Epic poem about early Zoroastrians

The Story of Sanjan (also Qissa-i Sanjan or Kisse-i Sanjan) (Persian: قصه سنجان, Gujarati: કિસે સનજાન/કિસ્સા-એ-સંજાણ) a Persian verse narrative written by Parsi priest Bahman Kaikobad in 1599 CE, recounting how Zoroastrian refugees fled Iran after the Arab conquest and settled in India, becoming the Parsi community. It is the only surviving literary record of that migration and settlement. Members of the Parsi community consider the epic poem to be an accurate account of their ancestors.

The account begins in Greater Khorasan, and narrates the travel of the emigrants to Gujarat, on the west coast of present-day India. The first chapter, longest in the work, ends with the establishment of a Fire Temple at Sanjan (Gujarat), and the later dispersion of their descendants. In later chapters, the Qissa narrates the success in repelling foreign invaders, then the failure in the same, and the subsequent flight of the Zoroastrians. The account closes with a chapter on the conveyance of the "Fire of the Warharan" to Navsari.

In its conclusion, the story is signed by a Parsi priest named Bahman Kaikobad (or 'Bahman Kaikobad Hamjiar Sanjana'). The date of authorship is recorded as 969 YZ (1599 CE, see Zoroastrian calendar) – several centuries after the described events are thought to have occurred. The account is in verse, in the highly verbose style common to Persian poetry.

The Kisseh-i Sanjan, as Abraham Anquetil-Duperron transliterated the name, became available to European scholarship in 1771, when Duperron published a French translation. However, it was not until the beginning of the 20th century that the poem attracted widespread attention, particularly among the Parsi-Zoroastrian priesthood.

== Contents ==
Quotations in the following section are from an English language translation by Shahpurshah Hormasji Hodivala, published in 1920.

The first chapter of the narrative begins with the fall of the Sassanid Empire in 642CE, as part of the Muslim conquest of Persia. The subsequent persecution of Zoroastrians led to the dispersion of the people "of good faith", and ultimately the Zoroastrians' departure from Greater Khorasan.

The refugees first made for a major port city ^{[a1]} near Bushire, where they stayed for 15 years. From there they sailed for Hindustan, the northern territories of the Indian subcontinent. They landed on the Island of Div, in southern Saurashtra, where they stayed for another 19 years. From Div, they sailed along the coast, weathered a severe storm at sea, and finally landed in Gujarat. Some accounts state that about 18,000 Parsis came in seven junks, five of them landing in Div, one at Variav near Surat and one at Cambay in Gujarat.

There, they approached the local Hindu king, Jadi Rana, and requested asylum. The ruler, fearing for his kingdom, asked them to explain their beliefs, and made four other stipulations for granting asylum:

- they were to adopt the local language (Gujarati)
- their women were to wear the garments of the local women (the Sari)
- they were to cease to carry weapons
- marriages were only to be performed in the evenings

The refugees, accepting the demands, expounded on the teachings of their faith, and "when the Hindu Raja heard the oration, his mind regained perfect ease." Having been granted asylum, the emigrants established the settlement of Sanjan (Gujarat), which was soon flourishing.

Some time thereafter, the priests of the fledgling community approached the king with a request to establish a Fire Temple. Their wish was granted, and a temple was subsequently installed and consecrated. The Fire is subsequently referred to in the story as the "Fire of Warharan."^{[b]}

The narrative then glosses over the next five or seven centuries (both periods are mentioned). At the end of the first chapter, many of the descendants of the original settlers are said to have dispersed in all directions.

In the subsequent three chapters, the account narrates the invasion by foreign troops. At first, with the assistance of the Zoroastrians, the invaders are repelled. In the battle on the next day, "Fortune [...] turned its face", and the Raja was killed.

The fifth chapter narrates the fleeing of the Zoroastrians to Bahrot, taking the fire from the temple in Sanjan with them. They stayed there for twelve years, then moved to Bandsdah, where a new temple was consecrated.

In the sixth and final chapter of the narrative, the account describes the conveyance of the fire to a new temple at Navsari.

== Issues raised by the text ==
In the absence of alternatives, the Story of Sanjan is generally accepted to be the only narrative of the early years of the Zoroastrian migrants to the Indian subcontinent. Among the Parsi community, the story is perceived to be an accurate account of their forebears.

The importance of the story lies in any case not so much in its reconstruction of events than in its depiction of the Parsis – in the way they have come to view themselves – and in their relationship to the dominant culture. As such, the text plays a crucial role in shaping Parsi identity. But, "even if one comes to the conclusion that the chronicle based on verbal transmission is not more than a legend, it still remains without doubt an extremely informative document for Parsee historiography."

In the Story of Sanjan, it appears as if the Zoroastrians must have had some contact with Gujarat prior to their journey there, which has prompted suggestions that the Zoroastrians of the story were not in fact the first migrants. Whether these were also asylum seekers is unclear, but Iranian influence and emigrants are discernible in India long before the Parsis of the narrative arrive. The text states the migrants knew in advance that Gujarat was governed by a monarch tolerant towards other (i.e. non-Hindu) religious beliefs, and this may have been determined through trade with the region (the city^{[a2]} near Bushire – where the narrative's Zoroastrians are said to have lived for 15 years before setting sail – had extensive trading connections with the east).

The story's chronology is the basis of several different estimates of the year of migration. Although the story is precise with respect to some elapsed periods, it is vague or contradictory with respect to others. Consequently (and in conjunction with an unrelated document from 1826), three dates – 936, 785 and 716 – have been proposed as the year of landing. The sacking of Sanjan referred to in the fourth chapter probably occurred in 1465 (see Delhi Sultanate), which would put 716 CE c. 750 years before the invasion and 936 CE c. 530 years before that event. Both periods (seven centuries and five centuries) are mentioned in the text.

The question of whether Sanjan or Diu was the site of the first settlement in India was discussed with intensity in the early 20th century when a memorial commemorating their arrival was first proposed. That memorial was finally constructed at Sanjan, where it is today known as the Sanjan Stambh. Although the narrative is unclear on where precisely the Zoroastrians came from, the text may be interpreted such that the emigrants originated from Sanjan (Khorasan), a settlement near the ancient city of Merv (in today's Turkmenistan). Although the text states that many of the settlers took the name of 'Sanjana', the text is unclear as to whether they had done so before the naming of the settlement of Sanjan (that is, they had brought the name with them), or as a response to the naming of the settlement. The settlers were simply called 'Khorasanis' by the local citizens. Moreover, (family) names are not believed to have been common until much later. The author of the text does not give himself a family name.

Scholars of Parsi history are divided over interpretations of the stipulations for asylum, in particular that of the last, i.e. that marriages only be performed in the evenings, as the Hindus do. Even without any inclination to infer a hidden meaning, it does raise the question why was such a minor issue was a condition for asylum. In general, "that [the Parsis] clothe their cultural concessions to their Indian environment in the form of conditions set by a Hindu prince can be considered as self-justification of this group which, without these concessions – that is, giving up only a few customs while traditions were otherwise strictly kept – would hardly have been able to survive [...] as a minority in India."

== Notes ==
a. The text calls this port "Hormuz," but this not the same settlement as the present-day city of the same name on Jerun/Gerun Island. Sir Lewis Pelly traced the site of the ancient (or 'continental') Hormuz to be near Bushire. Ancient Hormuz served as port for much of the inland, and had extensive trading connections with India and the far-east.
b. The "Fire of Warharan" was moved from Navsari to Udvada in 1742 following disputes over sacerdotal jurisdiction of the fire. The present use of the expression Iranshah to refer to the fire there dates to the beginning of the 20th century. (see Udvada for details)
c. For a review, see Kulke and Maneck.

== Bibliography ==
- Boyce, Mary; Kotwal, Firoze M. (2003), "Irānshāh", Encyclopaedia Iranica, sup. 4, Costa Mesa: Mazda, archived from the original on 2008-02-08
- Bulsara, P. P. (1963), Highlights of Parsi History, Bombay
- Hodivala, Shahpurshah Hormasji (1920), "Kissah-i-Sanjan", Studies in Parsi History, Bombay
- Kotwal, Firoze M. (1974), "Some Observation on the History of the Parsi Dar-i Mihrs", Bulletin of the School of Oriental and African Studies, 37 (3): 664–669, doi:10.1017/S0041977X00127557
- Kulke, Eckehard (1978), The Parsees in India: A Minority as Agent of Social Change, New Delhi: Bell
- Maneck, Susan Stiles (1997), The Death of Ahriman: Culture, Identity and Theological Change Among the Parsis of India, Bombay: K. R. Cama Oriental Institute
- Modi, Jivanji J. (1905), A few events in the early history of the Parsis and their dates, Bombay
- Vimadalal, Jal Rustamji (1979), What a Parsee Should Know, Bombay
