= Jadi Rana =

Ruler of Sanjan

Jadi Rana was an Indian Rajput ruler of Sanjan, Valsad in present-day Gujarat as per the Qissa-i Sanjan, an epic poem completed in 1599, which is an account of the flight of some of the Zoroastrians who were subject to religious persecution following the fall of the Sassanid Empire, and of their early years in India, where they found refuge. A 20th-century translation of the Qissa transliterates the name as Jádi Rana.

== Jadi Rana in the Qissa-i Sanjan ==
According to the Qissa, Jadi Rana had a reputation for fairness that preceded him, which prompted some of the Zoroastrians who were fleeing religious persecution to seek asylum in his kingdom.

Jadi Rana asked them to explain their religious beliefs and customs, which they did. Satisfied with their explanation, he granted their request for asylum provided they adopt the local language (Gujarati); that their women adopt local dress (the Sari); and that they henceforth cease to bear arms. The refugees accepted the conditions and founded the settlement of Sanjan (cf: Sanjan in Greater Khorasan).

A short while later (the Qissa does not say how long), these Zoroastrians would request and receive permission from the king to establish a Fire Temple there. That fire, which would be moved to Udvada in the 18th century, is today considered to be the most important of its kind on the Indian subcontinent.

== Jadi Rana in Parsi literature ==
The Zoroastrians of the Qissa are believed to have been the ancestors of some members of the present-day Parsi community of the Indian subcontinent. Many Parsis consider the Qissa to be a factual account, and there are several ancillary Parsi legends in which Jadi Rana plays an important role. The origin and age of these legends is unknown, and they continue to be popular among Parsis.

Jadi Rana's enquiry into Zoroastrian beliefs and customs is said to have been satisfied by the recitation of fifteen Sanskrit verses (Shloka) that summarized the most important tenets of Zoroastrianism. These fifteen verses, together with another verse that is believed to have been the king's response to them, are collectively known to the Parsis as the "Sixteen Shloka".

== "Like sugar in milk" ==
One interesting, perhaps apocryphal Parsi legend relates the course of the initial meeting between Jadi Rana and the newly landed emigrants: When the Zoroastrians requested asylum, Jadi Rana motioned to a vessel of milk filled to the very brim to signify that his kingdom was already full and could not accept refugees. In response, one of the Zoroastrian priests added a pinch of sugar to the milk, thus indicating that they would not bring the vessel to overflowing and indeed make the lives of the citizens sweeter. Jadi Rana gave shelter to the emigrants and permitted them to practice their religion and traditions freely.

== See also ==
- Qissa-i Sanjan, the 'Story of Sanjan'.
- Rajputs
- History of Gujarat
