= Thy name is =

Snowclone

"______, thy name is ______" is a snowclone used to indicate the completeness with which something or somebody (indicated by the second part) embodies a particular quality (indicated by the first part), usually a negative one.

== History ==
In most instances, the usage is an allusion to Shakespeare's Hamlet (I, ii, 146). In this work, the title character is chastised by his uncle (and new stepfather), Claudius, for grieving his father so much, calling it unmanly. In his resultant soliloquy, Hamlet denounces his mother's swift remarriage with the statement, "Frailty, thy name is woman." He thus describes all of womankind as frail and weak in character. The phrase is recognized as one of the "memorable expressions" from the play to become "proverbial".

In the book Idiom Structure in English by Adam Makkai, the author asserts that the phrase is included among English idioms that are expressed in a "standard format" and whose usage "signals to the hearer that he is using an authority in underscoring his own opinion." Researchers Andrew Littlejohn and Sandhya Rao Mehta acknowledged that the famous quote rendered not only a discursive use, but a constructional one as well, noting that "the structure itself can be used as a salient, but neutral equation formula...'noun thy name is noun.'"

== Examples ==
=== Law ===
Supreme Court Justice Antonin Scalia, dissenting from the Court's decision in King v. Burwell, upholding the Patient Protection and Affordable Care Act, repeatedly used the construction to criticize the Court's majority opinion, stating: "Understatement, thy name is an opinion on the Affordable Care Act!"; "Impossible possibility, thy name is an opinion on the Affordable Care Act!"; and "Contrivance, thy name is an opinion on the Affordable Care Act!" (25 June 2015)

=== Quoted ===
Amos Bronson Alcott famously said of William Ellery Channing in 1871, "Whim, thy name is Channing." He was referring to Channing's Transcendentalist poetry style.

=== Literature ===
- The poet Anne Sexton titled a poem "Divorce, Thy Name Is Woman".
- Borrowing directly from Hamlet, Edmond Dantès (disguised as Abbé Busoni) utters the phrase "Frailty, thy name is woman!" in The Count of Monte Cristo after learning that his fiancée, Mercédès, has married his rival Fernand.
- In the James Joyce novel Ulysses, Leopold Bloom utters the phrase, "Frailty, thy name is marriage," in response to a quip.
- In the Clive Cussler novel "Plague Ship", Juan Cabrillo quips, "Ego, thy name is Gomez," to Corporation helicopter pilot Gomez Adams after he brags about his perfect takeoff.
- In Stephen King short story Herman Wouk Is Still Alive, Ollie responds to his friend, "Ingratitude, thy name is woman".

=== Music ===
- The Half Man Half Biscuit song "Whiteness, Thy Name Is Meltonian", from the 1993 album This Leaden Pall, refers to a brand of None-More-White shoe polish.
- The lyrics "Frailty, thy name is weakness. Vengeance, thy name is pain" appear in the Dark Tranquillity song "...Of Melancholy Burning".

=== Television ===
- Samantha on Bewitched says to Darrin, "Vanity, thy name is human" (1.8; 1964).
- In Taxi (1982), Jim, on learning that Zena is to marry another man (whilst believing that she is still with Louis): "Oh, perfidy! Thy name is woman!"
- Bart Simpson says, "Comedy, thy name is Krusty" in The Simpsons episode "Krusty Gets Busted" (1990).
- Danny Tanner on Full House says "Loneliness, thy name is Danny" (in the episode "A Date with Fate", 1994).
- Professor Farnsworth on Futurama says in his recorded message, "Oh vanity, thy name is Professor Farnsworth" (2.15; 1999).
- Referring to his wife, Ray Barone on Everybody Loves Raymond (in episode 19, "The Canister", of the show's fifth season, 2001), says, "Devil, thy name is woman!"
- On the episode "Isaac and Ishmael" of The West Wing, Sam Seaborn says, "Ah temptation, I have named thee and thy name is woman."
- Gil Grissom on CSI: Crime Scene Investigation says, "Vanity, thy name is Hodges" (6.13; 2005), referring to another CSI, David Hodges, after walking in on him trying to color some of his greying hair with a sharpie while looking intensely at his reflection in a piece of lab equipment.
- Dr. Perry Cox on Scrubs says to Dr. Elliot Reid, "Hypocrisy, thy name is you" (in the episode "My Inconvenient Truth", 2007).
- Winn Schott on Supergirl says to James Olsen, "Jealousy, thy name is Olsen" (1.18; 2016), when Olsen denied he had a look after seeing how Kara talks to Barry Allen.
- In Community, after Jeff refuses to wear short shorts to play pool, Coach Bogner says "Vanity, thy name is... his name. It's first day I didn't catch it."
- In the SpongeBob SquarePants episode "Plankton's Army," Plankton exclaims, "Victory, thy name is Plankton" upon assembling the titular army (3.18b, 2004).
- In the Ted Lasso episode "Carol of the Bells," Ted exclaims, "Hubris, thy name is Ted" having seen his son prefer a gift to his company.
- In Studio C, Matt Meese used this phrase in two episodes where he cries "Cruelty, thy name is Econ" in "Econ 101" after believing to have failed his exam, and "Tyranny, thy name is Sprinkles", when confronting the head elf in the "Santa's Elf's Go on Strike" episode (1.3, 2012 & 5.10, 2014).
- In In the Heat of the Night, Bill Gillespie exclaims: “Medicine, thy name is vague!”.

=== Gaming ===
- In Tetsuya Takahashi's Xenosaga Episode I, when Albedo kidnaps the realian MOMO in order to extract the Y-Data implemented into her by her late father Joachim Mizrahi, he holds a short speech in which he addresses her with the words "Frailty, thy name is women." He then goes on by stating "No...that's not right. You little realians weren't even born from a women's womb," referring to the artificial nature of her existence. (Bandai Namco Entertainment Inc. (2003. Xenosaga Episode I (PS2 Version)[Video game]. Tokio: Bandai Namco Entertainment.)
