= Sanjan, Gujarat =

Sanjan
- Town
- Location in Gujarat, India Sanjan (India)
- Coordinates: 20°12′4″N 72°48′4″E
- Country: India
- State: Gujarat
- District: Valsad
- Taluka: Umargam

Population (2011)
  - Total: 15,544

Languages
  - Official: Gujarati, Dhodia, Hindi,
- Time zone: UTC+5:30 (IST)
- Postal code: 396150
- Vehicle registration: GJ 15

Sanjan is a town situated in Umargam taluka in the Valsad district in the state of Gujarat, India. Sanjan is located around 70 km from the Valsad city. It is the earliest settlement of the Parsis in India.

== Geography ==
Sanjan Bandar, also called old Sanjan is the initial settlement. Sanjan is situated on the banks of Varoli River.

== Transport ==
The town is served by Sanjan Railway Station which lies on New Delhi–Mumbai main line. The nearest airport is Surat Airport in Surat.

== History ==
Sanjan is believed to have been founded by Zoroastrian refugees who sought asylum in Gujarat in 698 AD. A widely believed legend is that the Zoroastrians were offered a filled pot of milk by Jadi Rana, the King of Sanjan to signify that his kingdom was full. In response, the Zoroastrians poured sugar into the milk without spilling any milk, stating they would adapt to the kingdom and cause no disorder, to which the King agreed. Those Zoroastrians, whose descendants are today known as the Parsis (since they came from Pars/Persia), are thought to have named the settlement after Sanjan in Greater Khorasan, the city of their origin.

The Mahanid Emirate was established by al-Fadl ibn Māhān in 813 in Sandān (Sanjan), and remained in existence until 841. It was one of the earliest independent Arab Muslim states in India.

Sanjan was captured by Mahmud Begada of the Delhi Sultanate in the 1480s. Later, Sanjan was captured and became part of the Portuguese Northern Provinces until it was captured by the Marathas under Chimaji Appa in his campaign against the Portuguese (1733–39). Sanjan fell to British forces during 18th century. It became part of Bombay State upon independence of India, and later became part of Gujarat.

=== Excavations ===
From 2002 to 2004, the World Zarathushti Cultural Foundation (WZCF) (Mumbai) and the Indian Archaeological Society (IAS) (New Delhi), conducted three seasons of archaeological excavations at the ancient mounds immediately North and East of Sanjan Bandar. The excavation Directors were (late) Dr S P Gupta of the IAS and Dr Kurush F Dalal. Three years (2002, 2003 & 2004) of excavations have revealed a large city (approx 2 km x 1 km) on the banks of the Varoli Creek/River which was occupied from the 8th to the 13th centuries AD. The houses were made of burnt brick and had solid stone foundations, they were equipped with sophisticated drainage in the form of adjacent Ringwells. That the city was involved directly in the trade activities of the Indian Ocean littoral is evidenced by the large amounts of West Asian and Chinese ceramics as also by the numerous numismatic finds and the large amounts of West Asian glassware and beads. West Asian ceramics identified for the first time include Sassanian-Islamic Turquoise Glazed Ware, sgraffito ware, Kashan Lustre ware, Tin glazed ware and other associated wares like Celadon. Chinese wares like eggshell ware, Yeuh and Qingbai porcelains and glazed stoneware were also recovered though in smaller numbers. The ceramics were studied and published by Dr. Rukshana Nanji. The published report is the first volume in the Sanjan Excavation Report Series. The glass was studied by Ms. Rhea Mitra-Dalal. Human remains were studied by Dr Veena Mushrif-Tripathi and published as the second volume in the series. The site has also yielded the first definitive proof of Parsi (Zoroastrian) occupation at Sanjan in the form of a dokhma or Tower of Silence (a uniquely Zoroastrian mortuary structure). The excavations and explorations have also yielded art historical data in the form of Hindu (Shilahara Period) sculptural and structural remains.

== See also ==
- Qissa-i Sanjan, an account of the early years of Zoroastrian settlers in India.
- Sanjan Stambh
- Jadi Rana
