= Sanjan (Khorasan) =

Ancient city in the Greater Khorasan

Coordinates: 37.5854°N 61.8480°E

Sanjan is an ancient city on the southern edge of the Kara-kum Desert, in the vicinity of the historically eminent oasis-city of Merv. Topographically, Sanjan is located in the Greater Khorasan region of Central Asia. Politically, Sanjan is in the present-day Mary Province of Turkmenistan.

Together with Merv, Sanjan was an important stopping place and center of trade on the southern route of the Silk Road. Sanjan gained further importance following the Seleucid establishment of Merv as the principal city of the Margiana province, a status it also held during the subsequent Parthian (250 BCE–226 CE) and Sassanid (226-651 CE) eras.

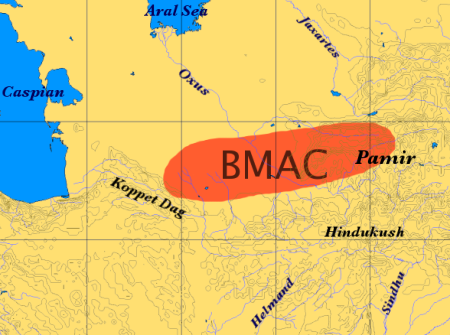
The extent of the BMAC (after EIEC).

As a site in the Bactria-Margiana Archaeological Complex, Sanjan is subject to the hypothesis that the Indo-Iranians, a major branch that split off from the Proto-Indo-Europeans, originated there. (see also: BMAC:Indo-Iranian hypothesis)

According to the Qissa-i Sanjan, an epic poem from around 1600, the Zoroastrians who fled to the Indian subcontinent in the 8th or 9th century, to escape religious persecution from Islamic invaders, established the settlement of Sanjan (Gujarat). These Zoroastrians, who were at first called Sanjanas or Khorasanis (today, the descendants of these and later Zoroastrian emigrants are collectively known as the Parsis), are thought to have named the Indian west-coast settlement after the city of their origin.

Sanjan must not be confused with the phonetically similar Iranian province Zanjan, or its capital, the city of Zanjan.
