= List of fire temples in India =

A fire temple, Agiary, Atash Kadeh (Persian: آتشکده), Atashgah (آتشگاه) or Dar-e Mehr (در مهر) is the place of worship for the followers of Zoroastrianism, the ancient religion of Iran (Persia). In the Zoroastrian religion, fire (see atar), together with clean water (see aban), are agents of ritual purity. Clean, white "ash for the purification ceremonies [is] regarded as the basis of ritual life", which "are essentially the rites proper to the tending of a domestic fire, for the temple [fire] is that of the hearth fire raised to a new solemnity". For, one "who sacrifices unto fire with fuel in his hand ..., is given happiness". There are about 177 odd fire temples in the world, of which some 150 are in India.

== List of Fire temples in India ==
Name	Location	Picture	Notes
Bahrot Caves	near Dahanu		Bahrot Caves, locally known as Barad, near Dahanu, Maharashtra are the only Parsi/Zoroastrian Cave temple in India. Bahrot Caves is located 25 km south of Sanjan, Gujarat and are situated at a small distance of 8 km away from the village of Bordi. They were unused Buddhist caves excavated by Buddhist monks. Zoroastrians hid for 13 years in these mountains after an invasion of their settlement at Sanjan by Alaf Khan, a general of Muhammad bin Tughluq in 1393 CE. The ‘Iranshah Flame’ was also moved to Bahrot during this period (1393–1405 CE). Even today, the Holy Fire is burning and it is given the most eminent grade of devoted fire in the world. Bahrot Caves have been declared a heritage site and is a protected monument under the Archaeological Survey of India (ASI).
Banaji Limji Agiary	Mumbai		Banaji Limji Agiary is the oldest Zoroastrian fire temple (or agiary, Gujarati for "house of fire") in Mumbai, India that was constructed in 1709. The fire was consecrated here by the Parsi businessman Seth Banaji Limji. The temple has a fortress-like structure and non-Parsis are not allowed to enter, as in all Zoroastrian temples. The temple is a Grade II heritage structure. Situated less than a kilometre away from the temple, Maneckji Seth Agiary (1733) is the second-oldest fire temple in Mumbai.
Iranshah Atash Behram	Udvada		The Iranshah Atash Behram, also known as the Iranshahr, or Udwada Atash Behram is a sacred fire housed in a temple in Udvada, Gujarat on the west coast of India. It is the first of the eight fire temples (holy place of worship) of the Zoroastrian religion in the country. The Atash Bahram, meaning "Victorious Fire", is the oldest fire temple in India, dated to the eighth century, and represents the historical cultural and religious links with Iran. The current temple housing the sacred fire was built in 1742 by Motlibai Wadia from Bombay. The temple structure, built spaciously, is well decorated and contains the Dasturji Koyaji Mirza hall and a museum. The main hall of the temple is accessed through a two-stage staircase. The temple attracts Zoroastrian pilgrims from all parts of India, Pakistan, and from around the world.
Maneckji Seth Agiary	Mumbai		Maneckji Seth Agiary is the second-oldest Zoroastrian fire temple (or agiary, Gujarati for "house of fire") in Mumbai, India that was constructed in 1735. Banaji Limji Agiary, established in 1709, is the oldest. As in all Zoroastrian temples, non-Parsis are not allowed to enter. The architecture of the building is a mix of Persian and Greek Revival styles, with two lamassus standing guard at the temple entrance.
Parsi Fire Temple	Secunderabad		Parsi Fire Temple is a place of worship for the Parsis in India. Located at MG Road in Secunderabad, Telangana, the temple is believed to have been consecrated in September 1847. The temple was built by two brothers and traders, Pestonji Meherji and Viccaji Meherji, who had settled down in Secunderabad. In addition to the temple, the compound also has residential and commercial buildings. The Parsi population in the twin cities of Hyderabad and Secunderabad is the second largest in India outside Mumbai.
Royapuram fire temple	Chennai		Jal Phiroj Clubwala Dar E Meher, popularly known as the Royapuram fire temple, is a Zoroastrian fire temple at Royapuram, Chennai, India. It was built in 1910 and donated to the Madras Parsi Zarthosti Anjuman by philanthropist Phiroj M. Clubwala. It is the only Parsi fire temple in Tamil Nadu and surrounding region, including Puducherry and Kerala. The flame in the temple is burning continuously ever since the temple was built and is stoked five times a day by the priest.

== See also ==
- List of fire temples in Iran
- Zoroastrianism in India
- Religions in India
- Religious tourism in India
