= Udwadia =

Udwadia may refer to:

== People ==
- Farokh Udwadia, Indian physician
- Tehemton Erach Udwadia (1934–2023), Indian surgeon and gastroenterologist
- Zarir Udwadia (born 1960), Indian pulmonologist

== Other uses ==
- Udwadia–Kalaba formulation, method for deriving the equations of motion of a constrained mechanical system
