= Iranshah Atash Behram =

Zoroastrian fire temple at Udvada, Gujarat, India

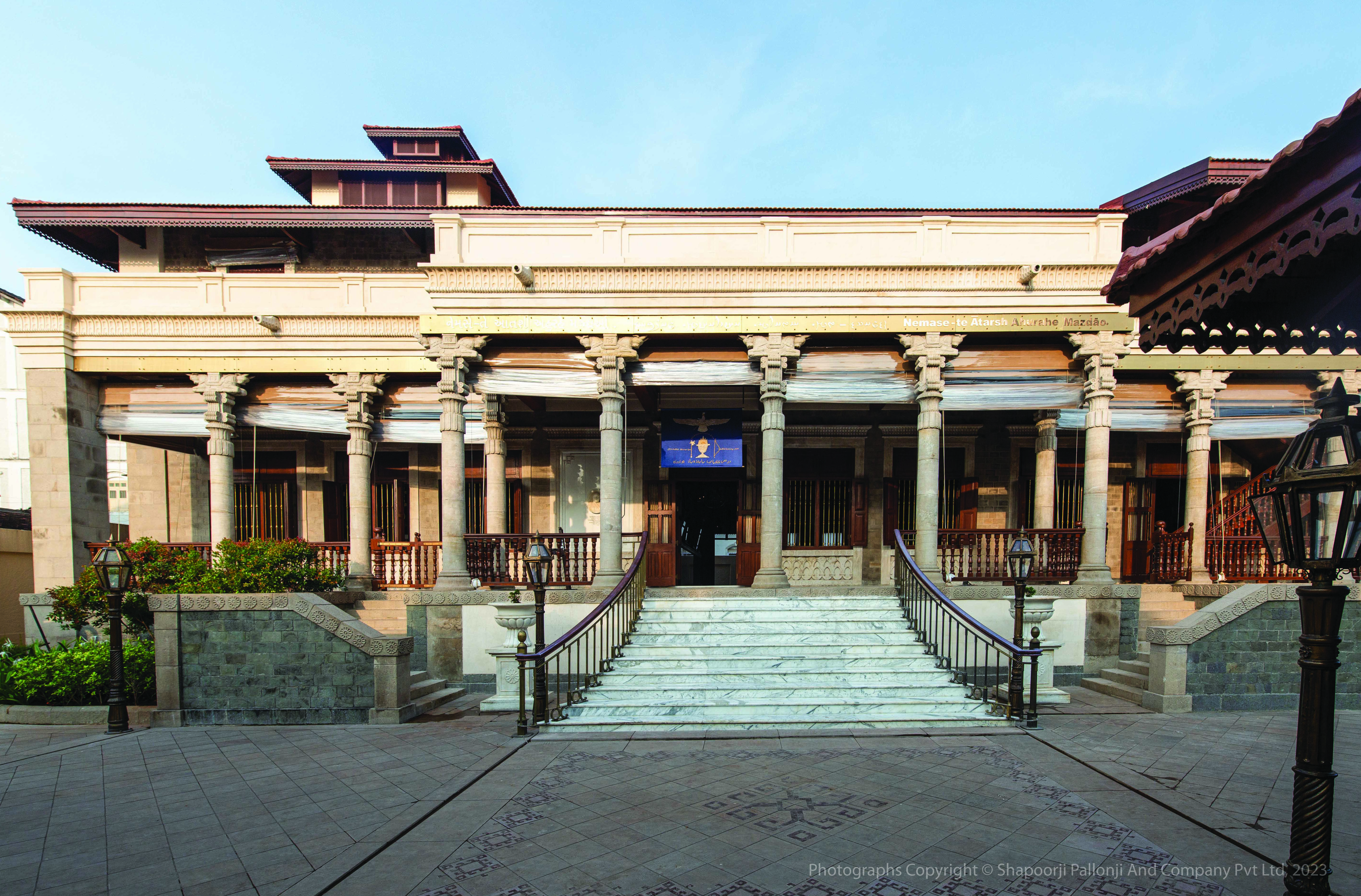
- Udvada Atash Behram Fire temple in Udvada

- Location in Gujarat Iranshah Atash Behram (India)

Religion
- Affiliation: Zoroastrianism
- Festivals: Salgiri, Bahram roj, Zoroastrian New Year

Location
- Location: Udvada, Valsad District
- State: Gujarat
- Country: India
- Coordinates: 20°29′15″N 72°52′14″E

The Iranshah Atash Behram, also known as the Udwada Atash Behram, is a sacred fire housed in a temple in Udvada, Valsad district, Gujarat on the west coast of India. The Atash Bahram, meaning "Victorious Fire", is the oldest fire temple in India, dated to the eighth century, and represents the historical cultural and religious links with Iran. The current temple housing the sacred fire was built in 1742 by Motlibai Wadia from Bombay. The temple structure, built spaciously, is well decorated and contains the Dasturji Kaiyoji Mirza hall and a museum. The main hall of the temple is accessed through a two-stage staircase. The temple attracts Zoroastrian pilgrims from all parts of India, Pakistan, and from around the world.

== Location ==
The Udvada Atash Behram, also called the Iran Shah, "King of Iran", is a fire temple of the Zoroastrian religion; one of the eight in India. It is located in Udvada (also spelled Udwada) in Valsad District, Gujarat on the west coast of India. Outside India, Yazd in Central Iran has the only other Atash Behram. Udvada, a small coastal village, of about 2 square kilometres (0.77 sq mi) area, is on the southern coast of Gujarat. The village was gifted to the priests by the king of Mandvi. It is approachable by road and rail. It is 206 kilometres (128 mi) away from Mumbai towards the north, situated between Vapi town and Daman on the National Highway (NH8) which passes through Manor. The nearest railway station is also in Udvada which is on the Virar-Surat section.

== History ==
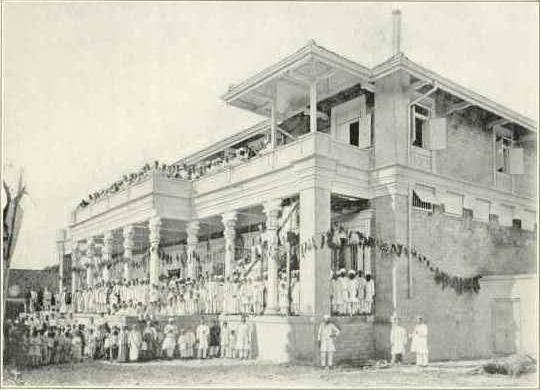
Udvada Atash Bahram in 1905

Udvada Atash Behram is the oldest existing fire temple in India, representing a cultural and religious link with Iran. The Atash Bahram fire was consecrated at Sanjan from alaat (sacred implements for consecration) brought from Iran to India in 715, consequent to the migration of Zoroastrians in Greater Persia due to the persecution by the Islamic rulers who conquered that country; those who moved to India are called Parsis; the earliest link of worship of the sacred fire in Zoroastrian temples are dated to the 4th-century BC. The Parsis traveled by ship from Hormuz in the Persian Gulf and landed on the Indian coast at Diu. They then moved along the coast to Sanjan, probably named by them to commemorate remembrance of a town in north Iran, Zanjan, in Northern Khorasan, (see link of Sanjan above), here the local Hindu king, Jadi Rana, gave them asylum and land to settle down but under a few stipulations. They settled down in Sanjan and then established their first Atash Bahram, a first-grade fire temple (fire drawn from sixteen sources) in India in 721 by enshrining the holy fire after consecration with alaats (sacred implements) that had been brought from Iran. This temple thus created a silsila, a traditional link, for the Parsi community of Sanjan with Iran. The consecration ceremony involved long and winding rites, which lasted for many months. The temple flourished, the community took firm roots, and it was their only such temple during that period, though as a community they spread to other regions of India. Their stay in Sanjan lasted for about four centuries till political events took a turn. In 1297, the Muslim ruler, Sultan Mahmud, invaded Gujarat and occupied the Sanjan area also; during this battle, the Parsis had sided with the Hindus but it was a lost cause. The Parsis then took shelter in the Bahrot Caves and kept the sacred fire there for 12 years. As the safety conditions improved, the Sanjan priests then shifted, with the holy fire, to another village known as Vansda, and remained there for 14 years, when pilgrims started visiting the fire shrine. During this period, one of the pilgrims, Changashah, also known as Changa Asa, of Navsari, who was also a benefactor, who used to travel to Bansda, persuaded the priests of Sanjan to move to Navsari.

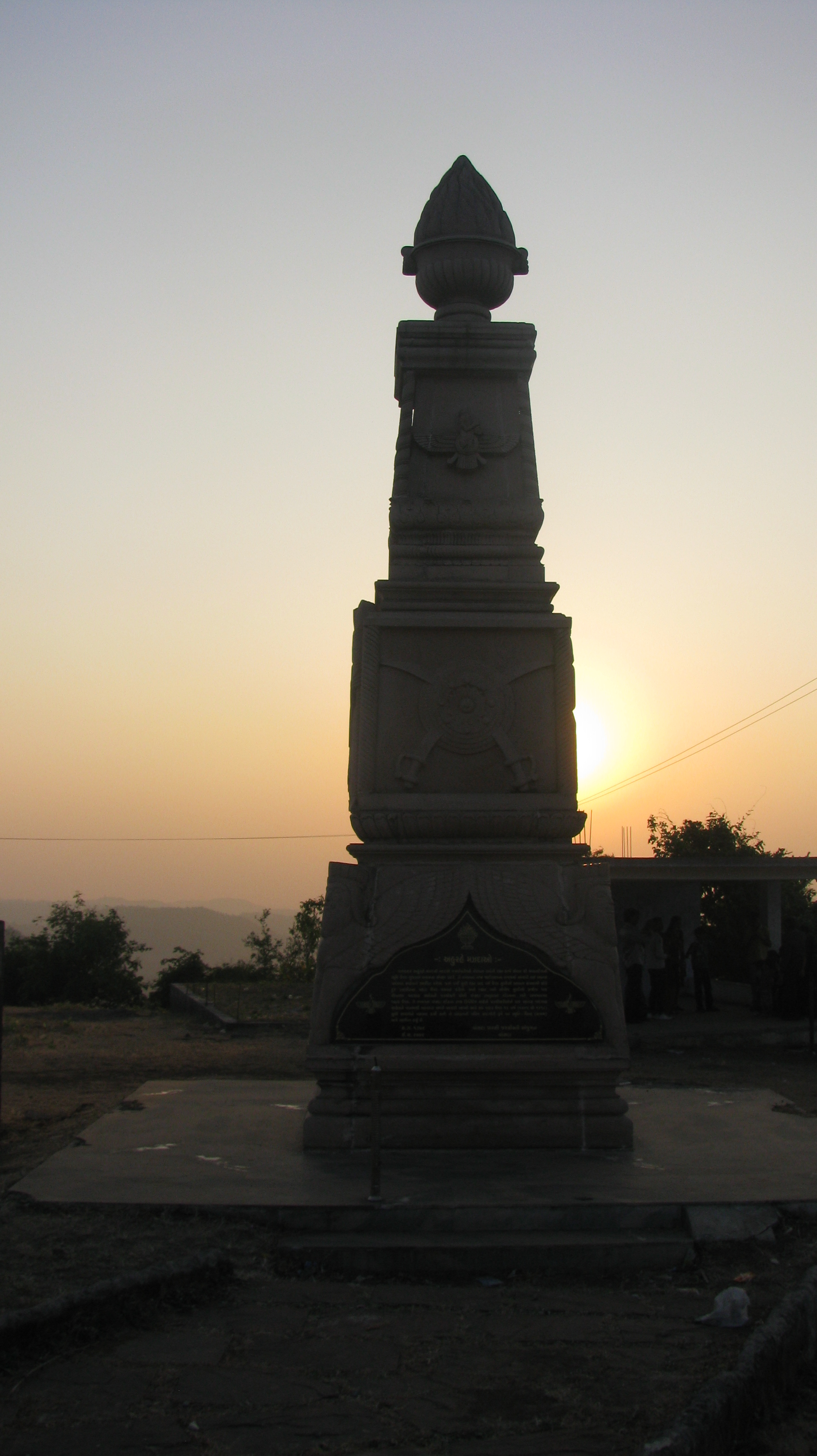
Ajmalgadh near Vansda where the holy fire was kept for 14 years. The memorial pillar marks the site.

In 1419, the holy fire was moved by the priests to Navsari, a town near Surat, where they established themselves for more than 300 years (1419 to 1740). Due to security concerns created by Pindharas (nomadic robbers), it temporarily moved to Surat, and as the situation eased it was brought back to Navsari. The Sanjan priests and the Bhagarias (local priests) of Navsari had a working arrangement to run the sacred fire temple, but this understanding broke down and legal issues ensued. Disturbed by this development, the Sanjan priests moved out of Navsari with their sacred fire, and housed the fire in one of the two agiaris (the first level of fire temples) in Valsad, 32 kilometres (20 mi) away from Navsari. Even here the Sanjan priests could not come to amicable terms with the local priests of the agiari and in 1741 they decided to move to Udvada, which was under the Sanjan community. One year later Zoroastrians built an Atash Behram in Udvada and moved the sacred fire to it; it was consecrated by two high priests (dasturs) who had carried the fire from Navsari.

The Atash Behram ("Iran Shah fire") is a symbolic representation of the Zoroastrian monarchy of Iran that was overthrown by Arabs), which had been first established at Sanjan in the 90th year of the Yezdezardi era by the first Shehenshahi Zoroastrian immigrants in India, is now maintained at Udvada by their descendants; these are nine families of priests who were descendants of the three priests who had retrieved the sacred fire from Sanjan to safety. Two High Priests or Dastur of the temple are chosen by a rotation system among these nine families. The last two High Priests serving together were Dr. Dastur Hormazdyar Mirza, a Ph.D. in Zoroastrian scholarship and Dastur Kaikobad Dastur. Upon his death, Dastur Hormazdyar was succeeded by his son, Dastur Peshotan Mirza, and after the demise of Dastur Kaikobad his son Dastur Khurshed. Dastur Peshotan too died and the dual High Priest system seems to have been temporarily set aside. It's important to note this dual High Priest tradition because the rest of the seven Atash Behrams in India have had the tradition of one High Priest of every temple.

To retain the heritage status of the fire temple and the Udvada town, a development plan was initiated in 2007 by the Government of India and Government of Gujarat with a fund of Rs. 15 million. This involved the preservation of the heritage buildings including the fire temple in Udvada without allowing to make it a tourist hub.

== Features ==
The architect and builder of the temple was Dinshaw Dorabjee Mistry from Mumbai. The temple structure has been built spaciously and well decorated. The main hall of the temple, which is 50 by 25 feet (15.2 m × 7.6 m), is accessed through a two-stage staircase. The flooring in the hall is paved with Minton tiles. A portrait of the Zoroaster is fixed in the main hall at a vantage position. In the first floor, there is a very large hall of 100 by 50 feet (30 m × 15 m) size. The color scheme, the quality of carpets, and the type of tiles used in the temple have received appreciation from the devotees. The urwisgah, or place of the rituals for worship, is accessed from the doors on the right at the entrance. Within this temple, there are the Dasturji Koyaji Mirza hall and a museum.

In Sanjan, the holy fire was placed in a traditional "altar-like pillar with hollow top" similar to those used in Iran. In Navasari, the fire was kept in an āfrinagān, which was shaped like a vase. A larger version of this was developed as a model for adoption at all other Atash Bahrams.

The boi ritual involves the enthroning of the (machi) of the fire. It is done with Nine sticks of sandalwood of 45 centimetres (18 in) length each; at other similar shrines the number of sandalwood sticks used are seven of 30 centimetres (12 in) length each.

Portrait of important priests and the religious organizations, who have played a significant role in establishing the temple, are fixed on the outer hall walls of the temple. The original temple was refurbished by Lady Motlibhai Wadia in 1894.

== Rituals ==
The key unique aspects of Iranshah's rituals are : the boi is only offered by Yozdathregar priests of the nine original Sanjana families, the bell is rung ten times instead of nine (the first bell being rung before offering the maachi), and the gãthu bharvāni kriya offered in Ushain geh where eleven Atash niayesh are prayed instead of nine and a charred wood billet is buried in the ash. The first boi and maachi, the ceremony that accompanies the regular tending of fire five times a day, was offered to the holy fire at the new temple by Dastur Phirozeji's son, Dastur Kekobad.

== Pilgrimage ==
Zoroastrian pilgrims from all parts of India, Iran, the United States, Canada, Pakistan, Australia, and New Zealand, and wherever Parsis and Zoroastrians have settled (there are families settled in Hong Kong, South Africa, Kenya, Singapore) and Iranian Zoroastrians visit the temple on pilgrimage. Newlywed couples also visit Udvada on pilgrimage, and on their behalf, their parents offer a machi (throne of wood to the fire) at the temple.

== Festivals ==
The anniversary, known as sālgiri, corresponding to the date of establishing the Atash Behram in Udvada and also in other Atash Bahrams in India, is celebrated every year according to the Shenshai Zoroastrian calendar on the day called Ādur of the month also called Ādur, the ninth Zoroastrian month and the ninth day of the month); pilgrims visit not only on the day of the month but also throughout the Ādur month. Apart from the salgiri, the other religious observance held every month is the "Bahrām" day (the twentieth day of the month). The Parsi New Year, normally held in August, is also celebrated here when a large number of devotees flock to the shrine.

On festive occasions, the Udvada shrine comes to life with large number of pilgrims engaged in buying sandalwood, flowers and other religious paraphernalia to offer to the fire.

== Gallery ==
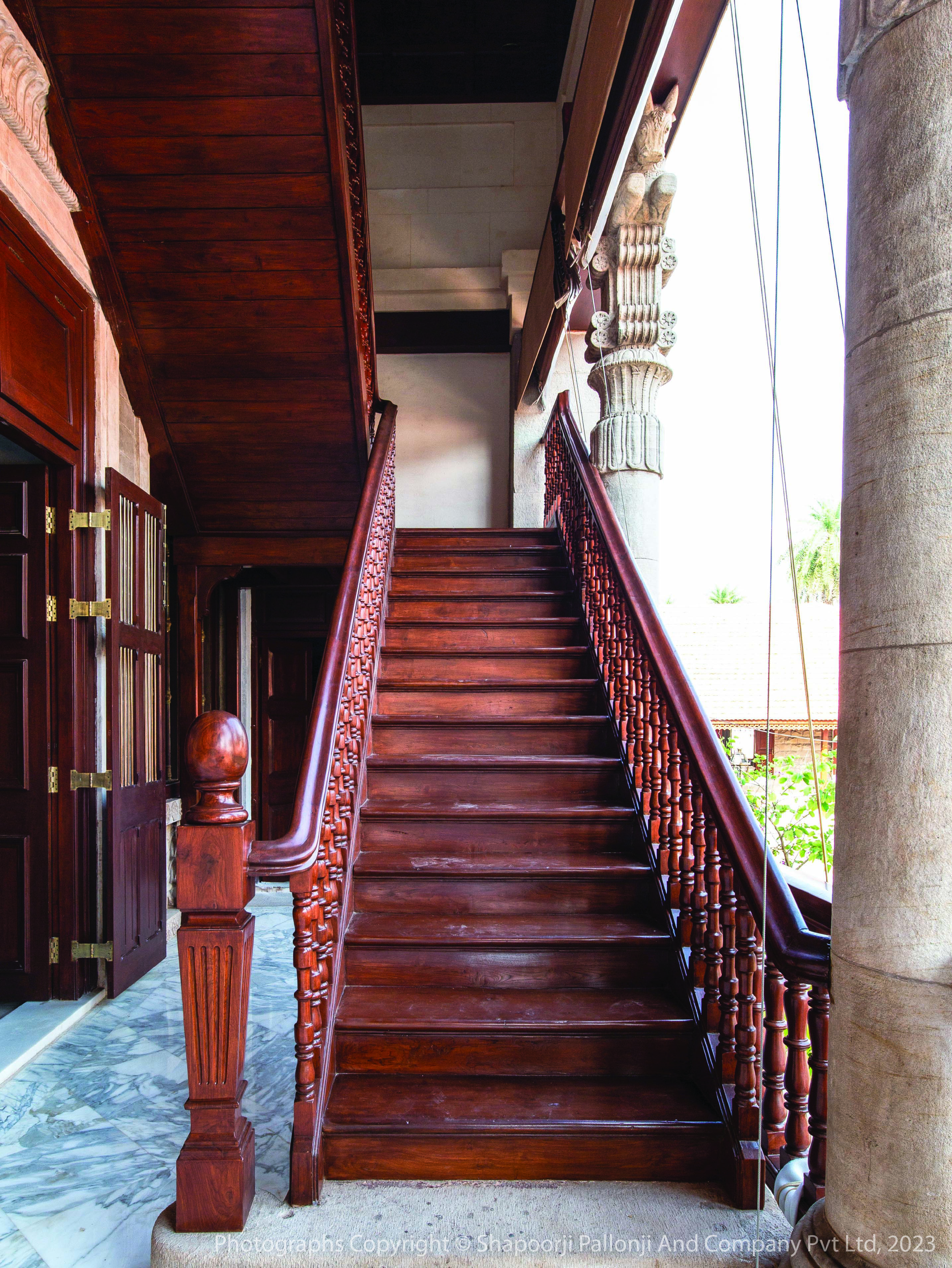
Restored staircase at the Verandah.

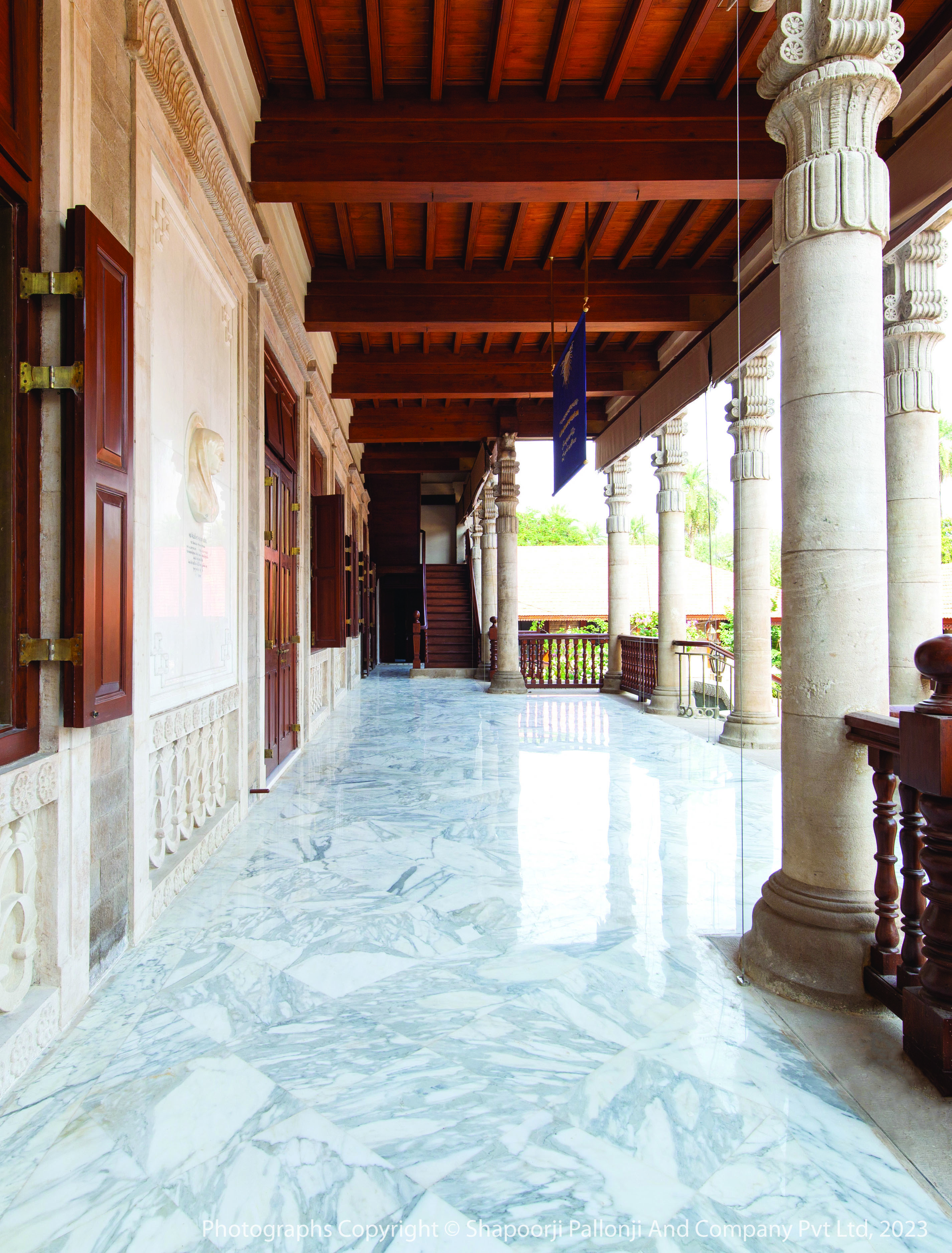
The verandah of the Iranshah Atash Behram.

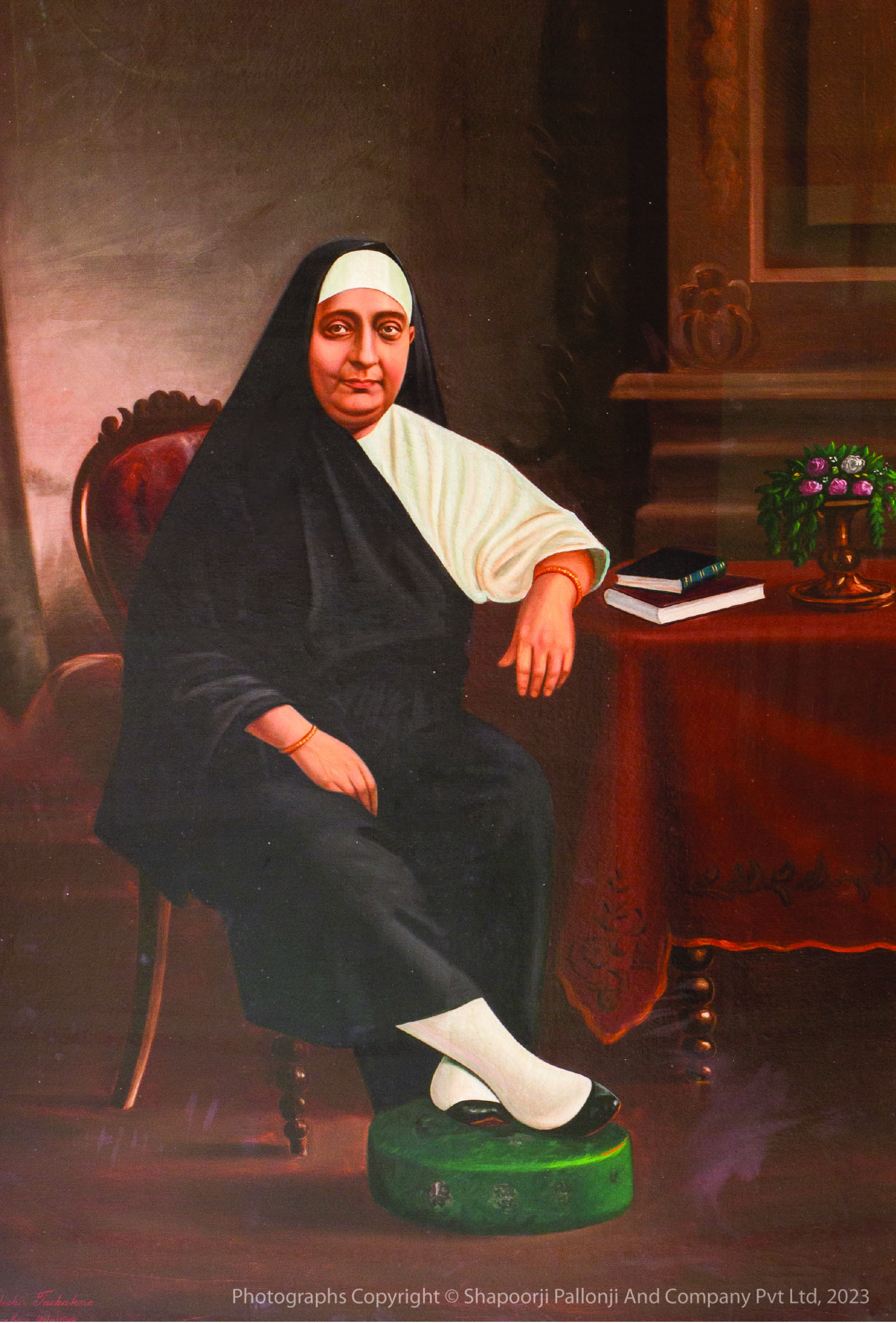
Portrait of Bai Motlibai Manockjee Wadia at the Iranshah Atash Behram.

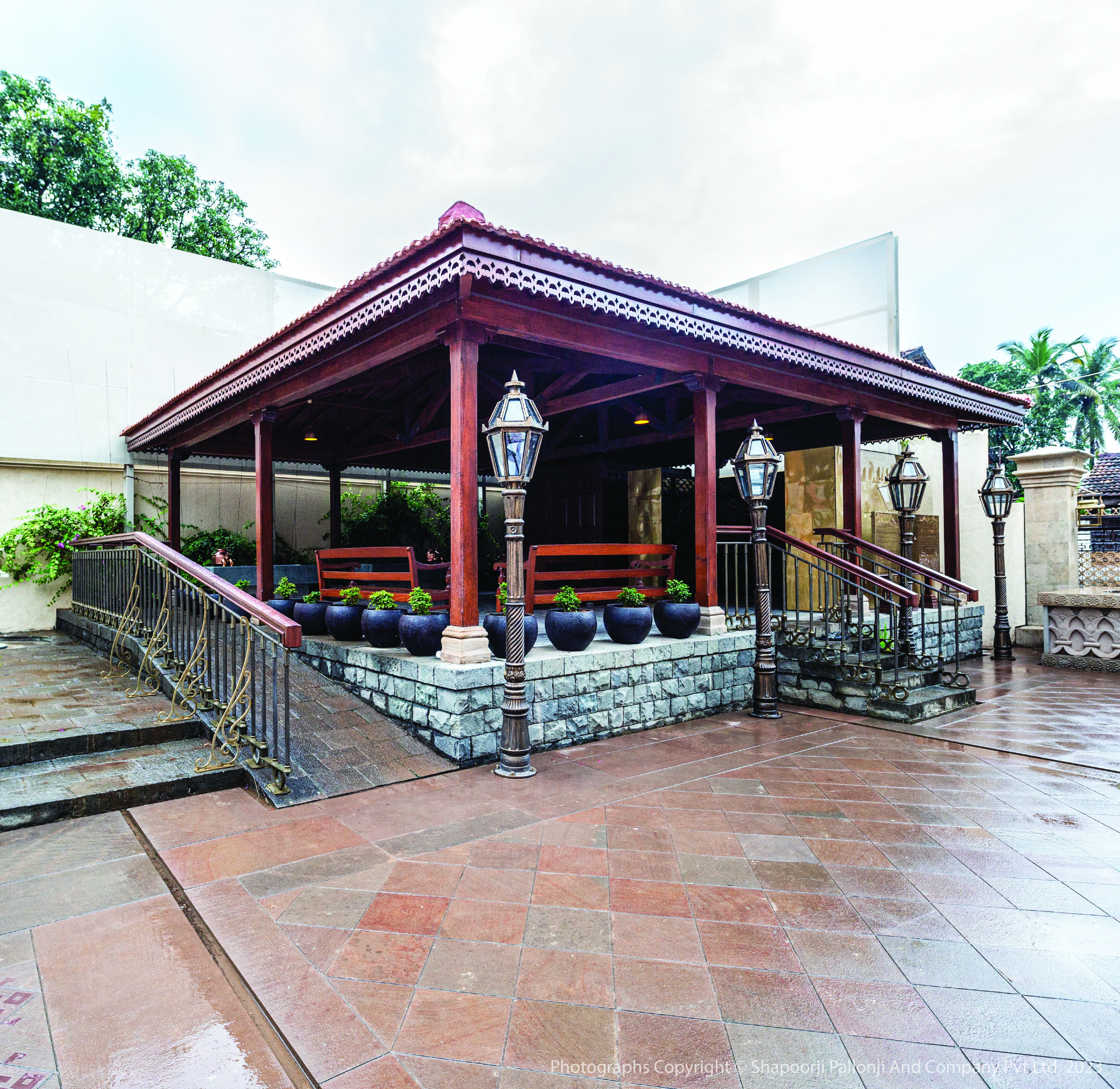
The Kustī Area.

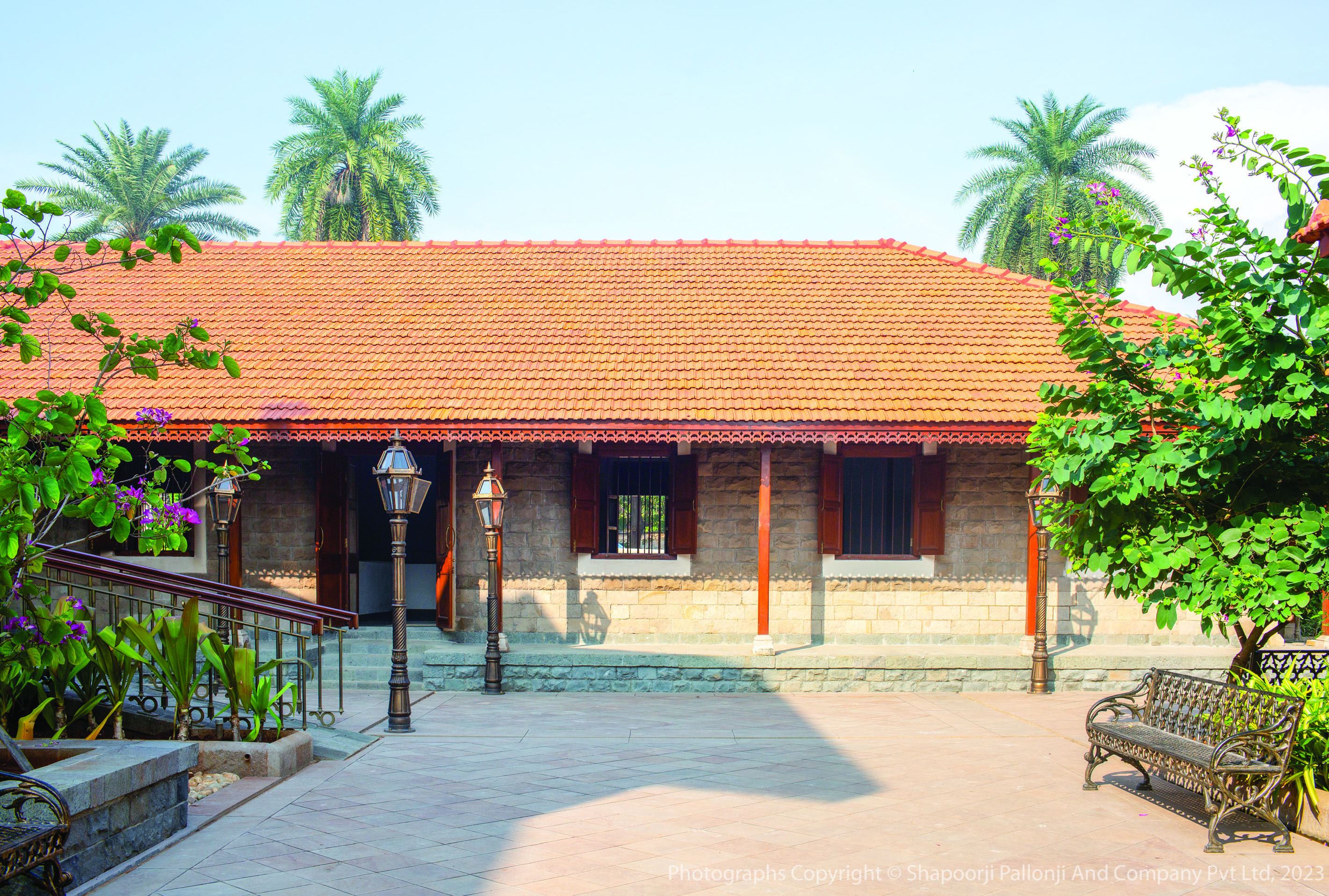
The Barashnūm Gāh.

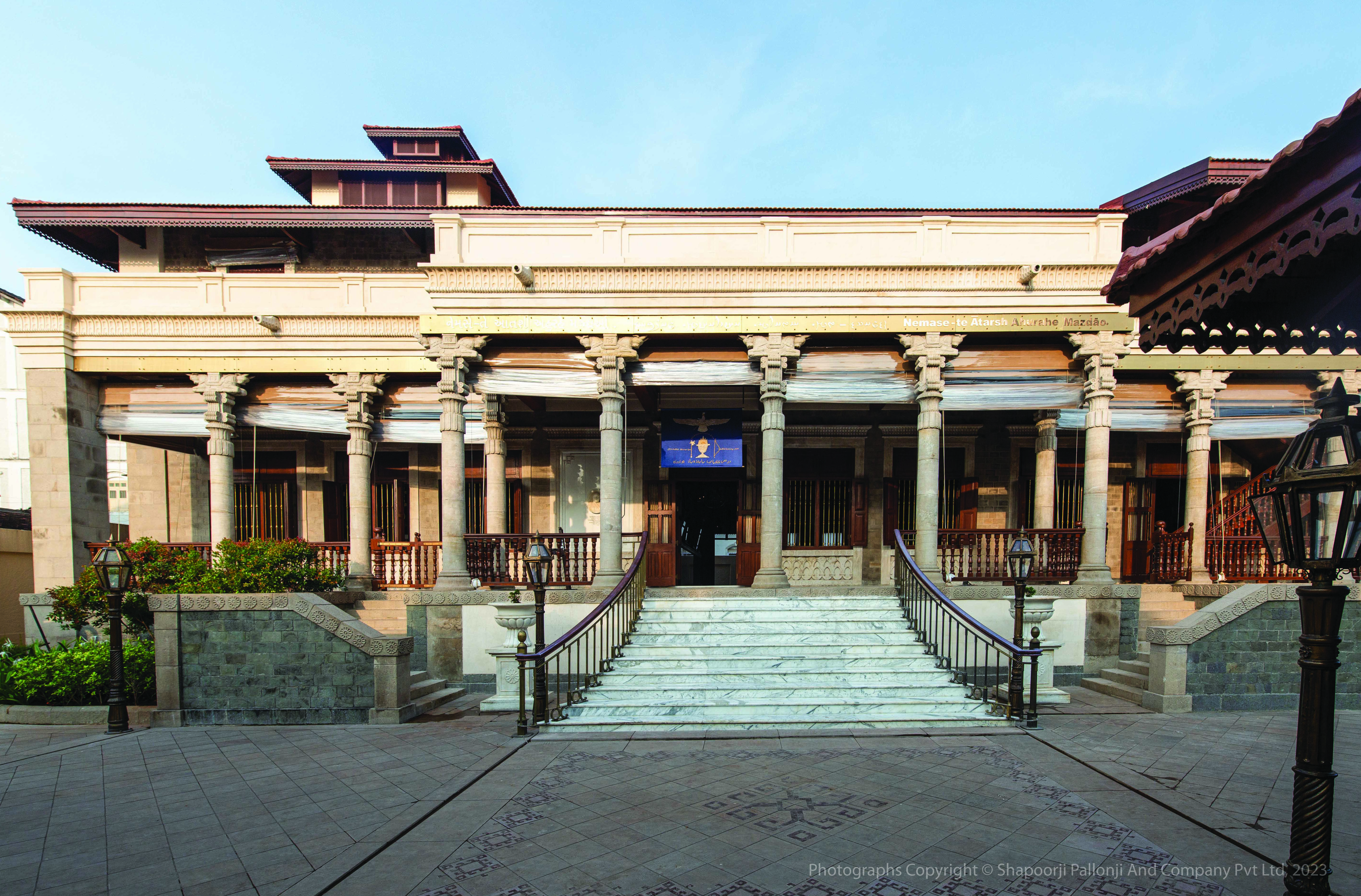
Iranshah Atash Behram front façade.

== See also ==
- Sharifabad, Ardakan, another notable Zoroastrian pilgrimage site in Iran
- Yazd Atash Behram
- List of fire temples in India

== Bibliography ==
- Giara, Marzban Jamshedji (2002). Global Directory of Zoroastrian Fire Temples. Marzban J. Giara.
- Godrej, Pheroza; Mistree, Firoza Punthakey (2002). A Zoroastrian Tapestry: Art, Religion & Culture. Mapin Pub. ISBN 978-81-85822-71-6.
- Hartz, Paula (2009). Zoroastrianism. Infobase Publishing. ISBN 978-1-4381-1780-5.
- Hartman, Sven S. (1980). Parsism: The Religions of Zoroaster. BRILL. ISBN 90-04-06208-4.
- Joshi, Prakash Vinod (9 February 2012). Life in Four Continents. iUniverse. ISBN 978-1-4697-0945-1.
- Kreyenbroek, Philip G. (2013). Living Zoroastrianism: Urban Parsis Speak about Their Religion. Routledge. ISBN 978-1-136-11962-0.
- Krishnan, Rama (2009). Many Paths, One Destination: Love, Peace, Compassion, Tolerance, and Understanding Through World Religions. Wheatmark, Inc. ISBN 978-1-60494-148-7.
- Meri, Josef W. (2005). Medieval Islamic Civilization: An Encyclopedia. Routledge. ISBN 978-1-135-45596-5.
- Rose, Jenny (2014). Zoroastrianism: An Introduction. I.B.Tauris. ISBN 978-0-85771-971-3.
