= Bahrot Caves =

Zoroastrian cave temple in India

Coordinates: 20.068798°N 72.823220°E

Location of Bahrot caves in India.

Bahrot Caves, locally known as Barad, near Dahanu, Maharashtra are the only Parsi/Zoroastrian Cave temple in India. Bahrot Caves is located 25 km south of Sanjan, Gujarat and are situated at a small distance of 8 km away from the village of Bordi also nearly 9 km from NH48 from Talasari.

This mountain range originally belonged to tribal people of the village which they used for collecting wood, karvi (which were used too make mudwall) Later they were unused Buddhist caves which were excavated by Buddhist monks. Zoroastrians hid for 13 years in these mountains after an invasion of their settlement at Sanjan by Alaf Khan, a general of Muhammad bin Tughluq in 1393 CE. The ‘Iranshah Flame’ was also moved to Bahrot during this period (1393–1405 CE). Even today, this Holy Fire is burning, now housed in a temple in Udvada, see Iranshah Atash Behram and it is given the most eminent grade of devoted fire in the world. Bahrot Caves has been declared a heritage site and is a protected monument under the Archaeological Survey of India (ASI).

== See also ==
- List of fire temples in India
