= Ilm-e-Khshnoom =

Mystical Zoroastrian school of thought

Ilm-e-Khshnoom ('science of ecstasy', or 'science of bliss') is a school of Zoroastrian thought, practiced by a very small minority of the Indian Zoroastrians (Parsis/Iranis), based on a mystic and esoteric, rather than literal, interpretation of religious texts.

== Principal belief ==
At the core of the philosophy is the belief that faith facilitates a connection to a consciousness that transcends normal experience or critical analysis, and that the prayers of the Avesta, which are to a degree metrical, are a means to achieve that consciousness. In contrast with mainstream Zoroastrianism, the beliefs in reincarnation, vegetarianism, spiritual vibrations, and the like are unique to the movement and are heavily influenced by Theosophy.

== The Saheb-e-Dilan ==
In 1875, an eighteen-year-old Parsi named Behramshah Nowroji Shroff left Surat (Gujarat, India) for Peshawar (now in Pakistan) in search of employment. According to followers of the mystic philosophy, on Shroff's way there, he met a caravan led by members of the Saheb-e-Dilan ("Masters of the Heart"), who persuaded him to accompany them to their home in the mountains. The Saheb-e-Dilan, according to Shroff, were a group of about 2000 individuals led by 72 Mahgav (Magi) priests, called the Abed Saheb-e-Dilan, who lived in isolation in the recesses of Caucasus Mountains (alternatively, in the Alborz range, around Mount Damavand). Having accompanied the caravan, say his followers, Behramshah Shroff lived with the Saheb-e-Dilan for three years, and so obtained an intimate knowledge of their religious practices and traditions which followed a mystic aspect of the teachings of Zarathushtra (Zoroaster).

Upon his return to India, Shroff gathered a following from among the Parsi community, who in due course began calling themselves 'Khshnoomists' after 'Khshnoom', or spiritual ecstasy, that they believed were embodied in their prayers and ceremonies.

== 20th Century development ==
Around 1909, Behramshah Nowroji Shroff met the Parsi priest and Zoroastrian scholar Phiroze Masani, who, influenced by the temperance movement of the United States, had established The Parsi Vegetarian & Temperance Society in Bombay two years earlier. The philosophy of the Ilm-e-Kshnoom had a deep influence on Masani, who in turn began publishing Shroff's teachings in Frashogard ('renewal'), the society's Gujarati quarterly.

In 1917, the society, together with its sister organization, the Zoroastrian Radih Society, bought a large tract of land in Bombay with the intention of establishing a Fire temple and a Zoroastrian residential complex there. The foundations were laid in 1923 by Behramshah Shroff himself, but it was not until 2001 that the Fire-Temple, now known as the "Behramshah Nowroji Shroff Daremeher", could be consecrated. The residential complex, now known as "Behram Baug", grew up around it.

Behramshah Nowroji Shroff died in 1927.

== Publications ==
Phiroze Masani continued to publish the Frashogard until his death in 1943. In 1947, Jehangir Chiniwalla, the younger brother of Framroze Chiniwalla, one of the more prolific authors of articles in the Frashogard, began publishing the weekly newspaper "Parsi Avaz".

The Parsi Avaz, which remained in print for 27 years, was followed by the Dini Avaz in Bombay in 1976, and the "Mazdayasni Connection" in the United States in 1983. The Parsi Pukar, founded in Bombay in 1995, is today the primary publication of followers of the Ilm-e-Kshnoom.
