= Udvada =

- town
- Location in Gujarat, India Udvada (India)
- Coordinates: 20.487500°N 72.870556°E
- Country: India
- State: Gujarat
- District: Valsad
- Taluka: Pardi

Population (2011)
  - Total: 5,897

Languages
  - Official: Gujarati
- Time zone: UTC+5:30 (IST)
- Postal code: 396180
- Telephone code: 91260
- Vehicle registration: GJ 15
- Sex ratio: 995/1000 ♀/♂

Udvada is a town situated in Pardi taluka in the Valsad district in the state of Gujarat, India. Udvada is a coastal town located around 24 km from the Valsad city. The Zoroastrian temple, Udvada Atash Behram is situated here.

== Etymology ==
The name Udvada means the 'grazing ground of camels', which it used to be before it became a fishing town.

== Geography ==
Udvada is situated on the mouth of Kolak River. It also has a hill on the outskirts of the town. It is neighbours with Daman and Diu and Dadra and Nagar haveli which is a Union Territory of India.

== Transport ==
The town is served by Udvada railway station for passenger trains & Vapi Railway Station for mail exp & superfast trains including with tejas, Shatabdi, which lies on New Delhi–Mumbai main line. The nearest airport is Surat Airport in Surat. Mumbai is the biggest airport nearby.

== Zoroastrianism ==
=== The Atash Behram ===
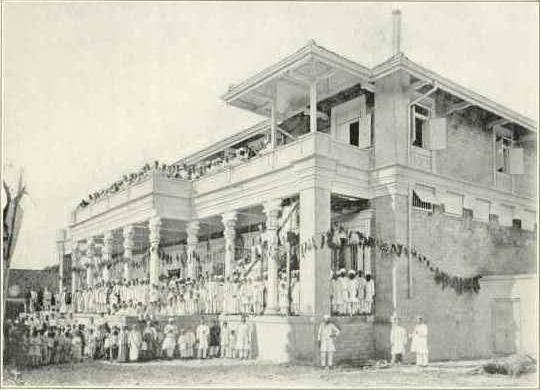
Udvada Atash Behram, 1905

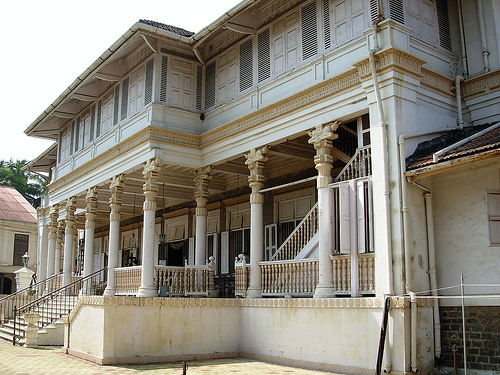
Udvada Atash Behram before 2009 renovations.

The Udvada Atash Behram (20°29′15″N 72°52′15″E) is the most sacred of the Zoroastrian fire temples in India and the oldest continuously burning fire-temple fire in India. The Udvada Atash Behram is one of nine Atash Behrams worldwide, eight of which are in western India (four in Mumbai, two in Surat, one in Navsari, and the one in Udvada), and one of which is in Yazd, in central Iran.

The importance of Udvada in Parsi (Indian Zoroastrian) history and religion centres around the Atash Behram (from Middle Persian Atash Warharan for 'Victorious Fire', the highest grade of ritual fire of the Zoroastrians) housed in the fire temple there.

==== Parsi History ====
Following the Muslim conquest of most of Greater Iran in the 7th century, Zoroastrians gradually became a marginalized community, and by about the 10th century, the formerly Zoroastrian-held territories had become largely Islamic. One group of Zoroastrians fled from Greater Khorasan to the west coast of India in order to preserve their religious customs and beliefs. Upon landing, the refugees founded the settlement of Sanjan, which lies about 30 km south of Udvada.

According to the same legend, on their journey, the Zoroastrians had carried ash from a sacred fire, which a priest is said to have then used for the bed of the Sanjan fire when it was consecrated. A related legend recounts that this fire was consecrated as Atash Bahram fires traditionally are, that is, out of 16 fires, including that of a funeral pyre, a shepherd's hearth, a goldsmith's hearth, a potter's kiln and from a fire caused by lightning.^{[1]}

Some centuries after their arrival (probably in the late 14th century), Sanjan was attacked by troops of the Delhi Sultanate (possibly those of Muhammad bin Tughluq^{[2]}) and the Parsis fled again, into caves in the nearby Barhot hills, 14 km south of Sanjan. The sacred fire went with them. Several years later it was installed in Navsari. In the 18th century, a decision was made to return the flame to Sanjan, but along the way, the priests preferred to remain in Udvada, where the fire temple was consecrated in 1742. ^{[3]}

The first recorded use of the name in reference to the fire there appears in a 1905 work by Jivanji Jamshedji Modi, who made several allusions to the "Iranshah Fire" within the space of two pages. In 1920, when Shahpurshah Hodivala published his English language translation of the Qissa-i Sanjan, he assumed that this was the original name of the fire. It had been so-called because it was consecrated to be the earthly representative of Yazdegerd III, the last Zoroastrian king of Iran, this explanation is accepted by almost all devout Parsis, and even the few sceptics among them tend to refer to the fire as the Iranshah.

In 1998, Sarosh Bana, executive editor with Business India, approached the then Gujarat government to declare Udvada village a ‘Heritage Precinct’. Bana organised a pictorial and architectural assessment of the village and set up a pilgrimage boarding facility and a museum showcasing the history of the Parsis and Udvada. The museum is now OPEN FOR PUBLIC.

==== Today ====
Ceremonial anniversary celebrations are held at the Atash Behram on the day of its founding. The ceremonies in Udvada are held on the ninth day of the ninth month in the Shahenshahi (imperial) version of the Zoroastrian calendar (which, in 2020, was on 21 April). Pilgrims from all over the world visit the temple on that day. Special ceremonies are also held on the 20th day of each month. In the Zoroastrian calendar, that day is dedicated to the divinity Verethragna (Avestan, Middle Persian Waharam, hence Behram), hypostasis of victory.

According to tradition and later as a result of the legal verdict, nine priestly families of Sanjan and their heirs are the sole lawful guardians of the fire and its temple. They alone have the right to enjoy their income. The position of high priest passes in turn from the head of one family to the head of another.^{[5]}

Major renovations are being made in Udvada Atash Behram by a renowned construction company Shapoorji Pallonji since December 2018. It was due for a major internal renovation. It was a major concern for the Parsi community for it holds great value in creating the community of Parsis in India.

=== Ilm-e Kshnoom ===
Udvada is also the religious centre of the Ilm-e-Kshnoom, a very small Zoroastrian sect based on a mystic and esoteric interpretation of religious texts. Founded in the early 20th century, this sect found a following among the prominent Unvala family of Udvada (after whom adherents of the Ilm-e-Kshnoom are also called the 'Unvala sect'), who then attempted to establish new standards of worship at the Atash Behram. The Unvalas eventually took the caretakers of the Atash Behram to court (which led to the nine families also gaining a legal footing), and when in 1936 two priests of the Atash Behram died, the Unvalas refused to accept their nominated successors. Maneckji Nusserwanji Dhalla, a highly respected theologian of the time, was called upon to intervene, and the issue was settled after over 25 years of discord. Dhalla had barely returned to his home town when the Ilm-e-Kshnoom sought to establish their priest as another 'high' priest.

=== Zoroastrian Heritage Museum ===
Udvada also hosts a Zoroastrian Heritage Museum, sponsored by the Government of Gujarat. This museum contains summaries of the teachings and beliefs of lord Ahura Mazda, it has a large write-up, that tells you about the history of the Parsi's and Ahura Mazda. It also has explanations and write-ups on the holy ceremony of the Parsis called Navjot. It also showcases brief biographies of some of the prominent personalities from the Parsi community and their contributions to India.

== Preservation ==
The town, and its ambience, is under threat from the advancing sea (and consequent salinity) and commercialization. The Mumbai-based Save Udvada Committee, supported by the Indian and Gujarat state governments, is engaged in combating sea-driven erosion.^{[6]} There have also been attempts to get Udvada declared a World Heritage Site, to protect the ancient residences and the fire temple. The typical Parsi homes here with their high ceilings, sloped roofs with ornamental skirting, and double otlas (porches) are over a century old, and considered worth preserving.

== See also ==
- Udwadia, a toponymic surname from the town:
  - Farokh Udwadia, Indian physician
  - Firdaus E. Udwadia: Indian mechanical engineer, known for the Udwadia–Kalaba formulation
  - Tehemton Erach Udwadia, Indian surgeon and gastroenterologist
  - Zarir Udwadia, Indian pulmonologist and researcher
