= Banaji Limji Agiary =

Zoroastrian fire temple in Mumbai, India

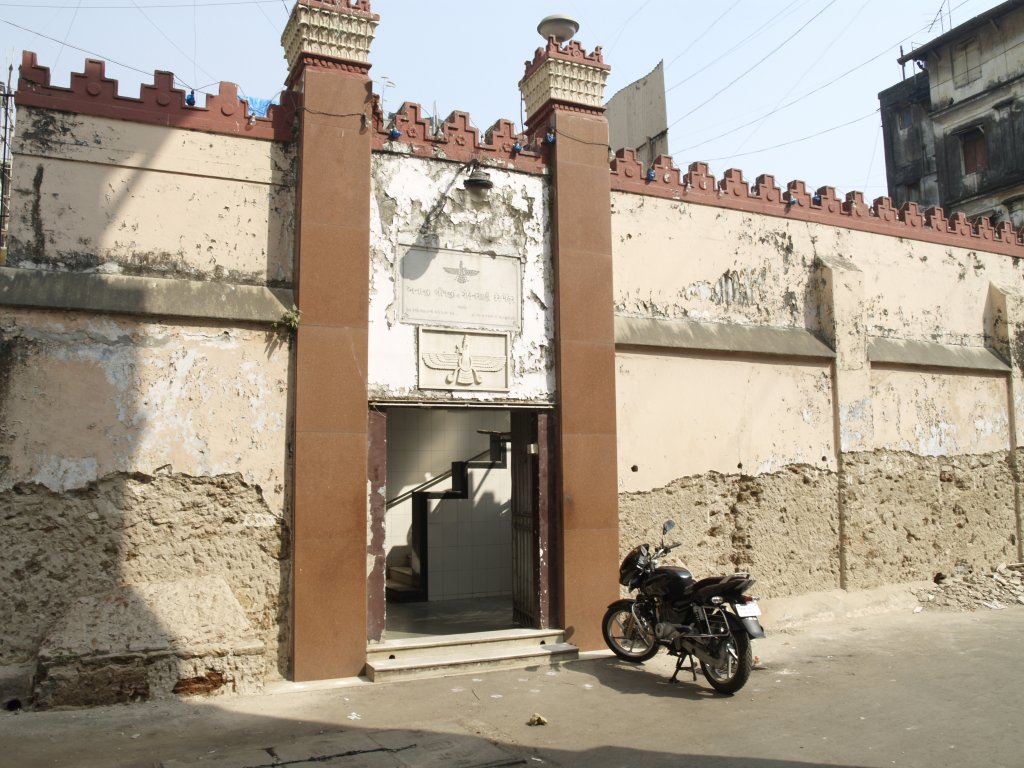
The outer walls of the temple in Fort, Mumbai.

Banaji Limji Agiary is the oldest Zoroastrian fire temple (or agiary, Gujarati for "house of fire") in Mumbai, India that was constructed in 1709. The fire was consecrated here by the Parsi businessman Seth Banaji Limji. The temple has a fortress-like structure and non-Parsis are not allowed to enter, as in all Zoroastrian temples. The temple is a Grade II heritage structure. Situated less than a kilometre away from the temple, Maneckji Seth Agiary (1733) is the second-oldest fire temple in Mumbai.

== See also ==
- List of fire temples in India
