= Sharifabad, Ardakan =

Neighborhood in Yazd province, Iran

Sharifabad شریف آباد
- village
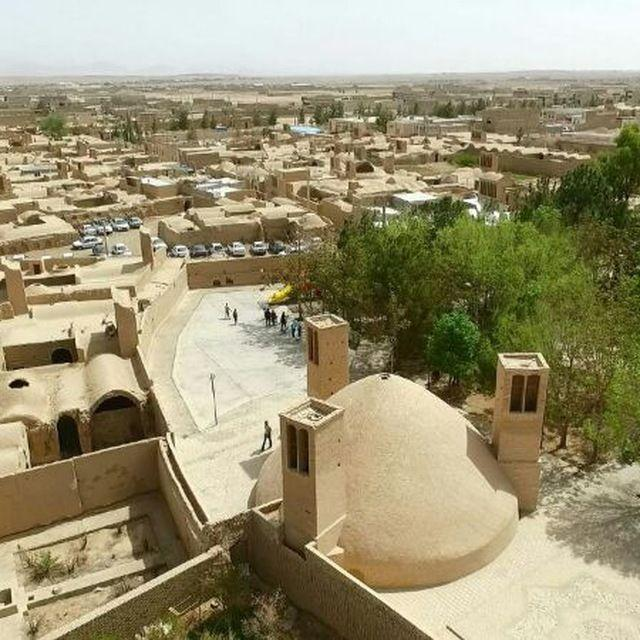
- Traditional architecture of the village

- Location within Iran
- Coordinates: 32°18′06″N 54°01′40″E
- Country: Iran
- Province: Yazd
- County: Ardakan
- City: Ardakan

Population (2006)
  - Total: 4,000
- Time zone: UTC+3:30 (IRST)

Sharifabad (Persian: شریف آباد) (Note: Also known as Sharfava) is a neighborhood of the city of Ardakan in the Central District of Ardakan County, Yazd province, Iran. Sharifabad is one of the Zoroastrian centres of Iran, home to numerous Zoroastrian holy sites. Every summer, thousands of Zoroastrians from around the world gather here on pilgrimage.

Sharifabad is also notable for the 1,000-year-old Qutbabad aqueduct that runs through the village. The village is home to both Muslims and Zoroastrians who worship separately and respect each other's beliefs.

Sharifabad is present in the historical book of Rostam Biliwani, which recorded that the village was formerly called "Shahriabad" and later renamed "Sharafabad" before receiving its current name.

== Zoroastrianism and Sharifabad ==
In Zoroastrianism's long history, Sharifabad has been of substantial importance as "the most important center for preserving traditional Zoroastrian beliefs in Iran, and the residence of many great priests for centuries." This led English writer Mary Boyce to describe the village as "A Persian Stronghold of Zoroastrianism". Her research on the life of Zoroastrian Sharifabad residents has been useful in research into contemporary Zoroastrian beliefs.

=== Hiromba ===
A festival of fire called Hiromba, (translation: "making bonfires", also known as Sadeh), is celebrated in Sharifabad.

== Zoroastrian relations with Mumbai ==
To review the beliefs, scriptures, rituals and ceremonies and other rules and regulations of the Zoroastrian religion, these Parsis of India sought help from their counterparts in Iran. Behram Nariman Houshang arrived with questions about the beliefs of the Zoroastrian religion, which were used to elicit information from the priests of Sharifabad and Torkabad villages. This was the first interaction between the Zoroastrians of Yazd and the Parsis. These relations continued for 300 years. The trading relationship between the East India Company and the Parsis also encouraged the Sharifabad Zoroastrians (and other Zoroastrian villages of Yazd) to emigrate to India. Mankeji Limji Houshangpour Hatria (whose ancestors were Iranian immigrants to India during the Safavid era) traveled to Iran and helped improve the Zoroastrians' lives in Yazd.

== Architecture ==
Parsi immigrants built small Zoroastrian schools in the early 19th century. Zoroastrian shrines, millennial aqueducts, brick and mud houses, narrow alleys, and large water reservoirs are found in the village. Sharifabad is also home to a famous Zoroastrian fire temple.

== Economy ==
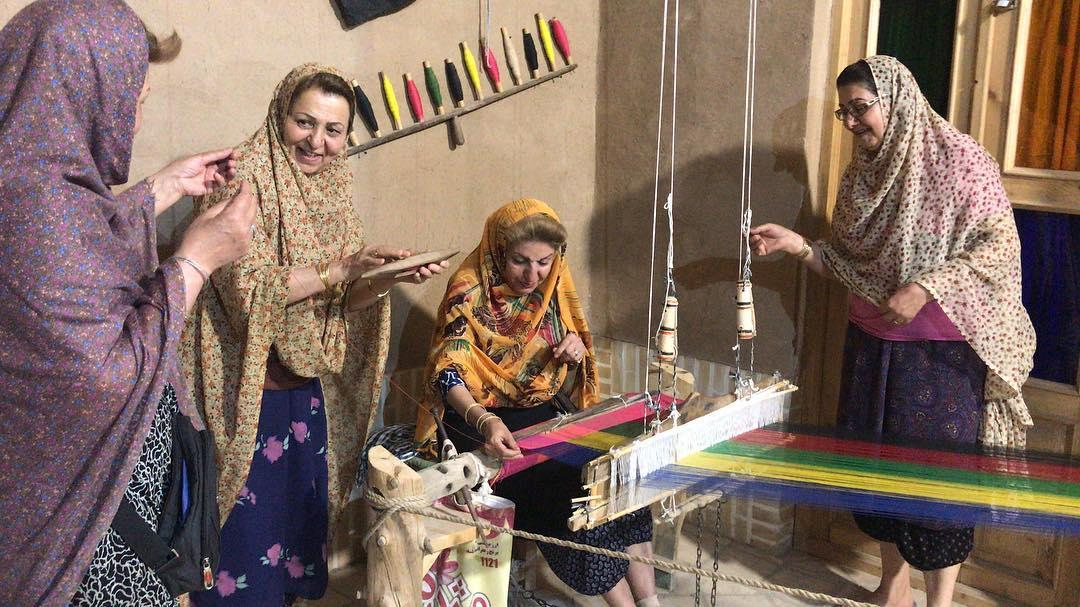
Zoroastrian women in Sharifabad

The economy of Sharifabad historically revolved around agriculture, with residents farming the deserts of Esmatabad and Allahabad. However, with the decline of the aqueduct and reduced groundwater, many have gradually turned to industrial production and service jobs. A considerable portion of the Muslim population has transitioned to craftsmanship, contributing to the tile, ceramic, and glass industries of the Yazd province. A growing number of residents have immigrated to Canada and the United States.

== See also ==
- Yazd Atash Behram
- Iranshah Atash Behram, another notable Zoroastrian pilgrimage site in India.

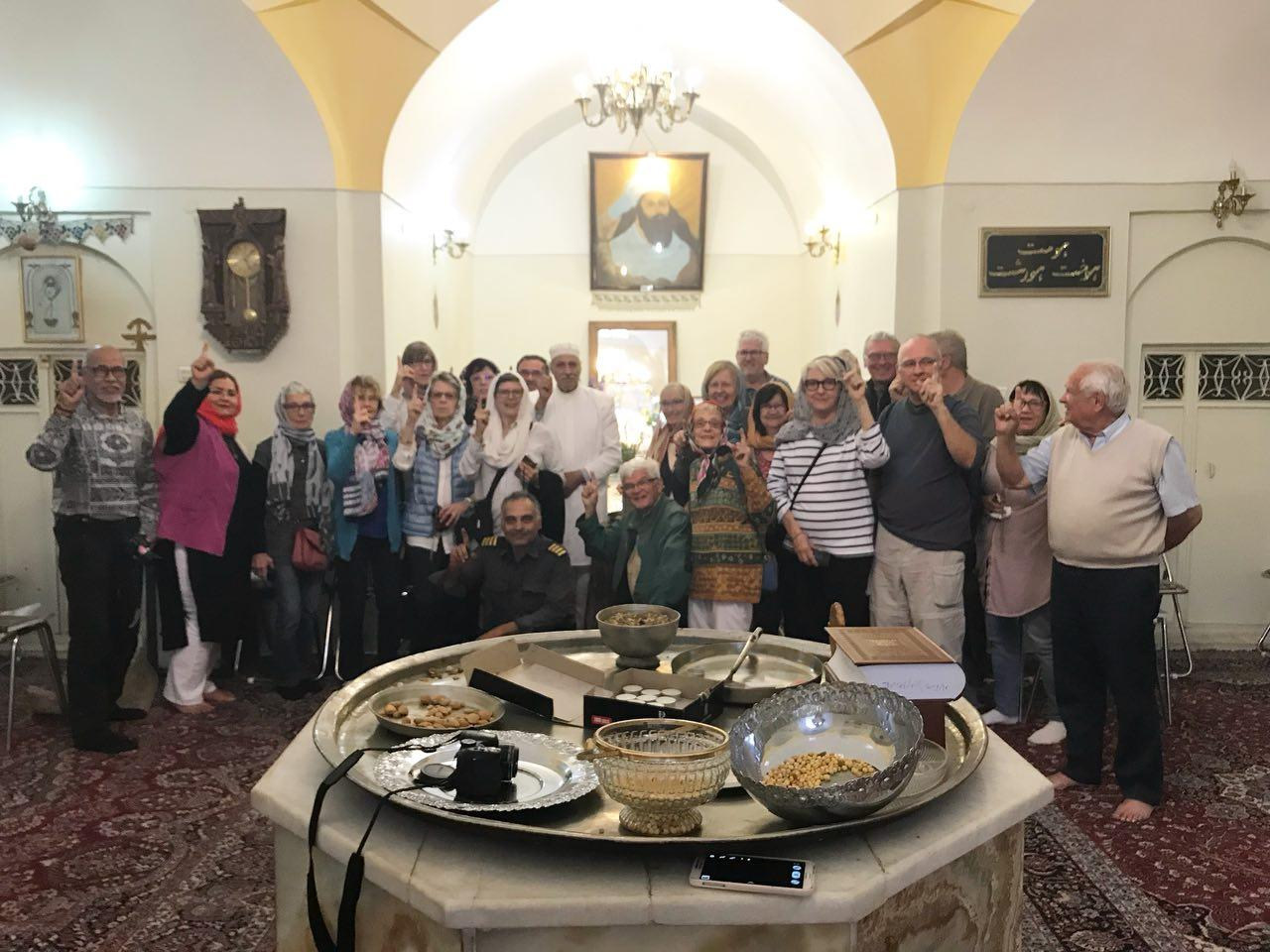
French tourists visit Sharifabad Ardakan Temple
