= Zoroastrianism in India =

Overview of the Zoroastrian populace in India

Indian Zoroastrians
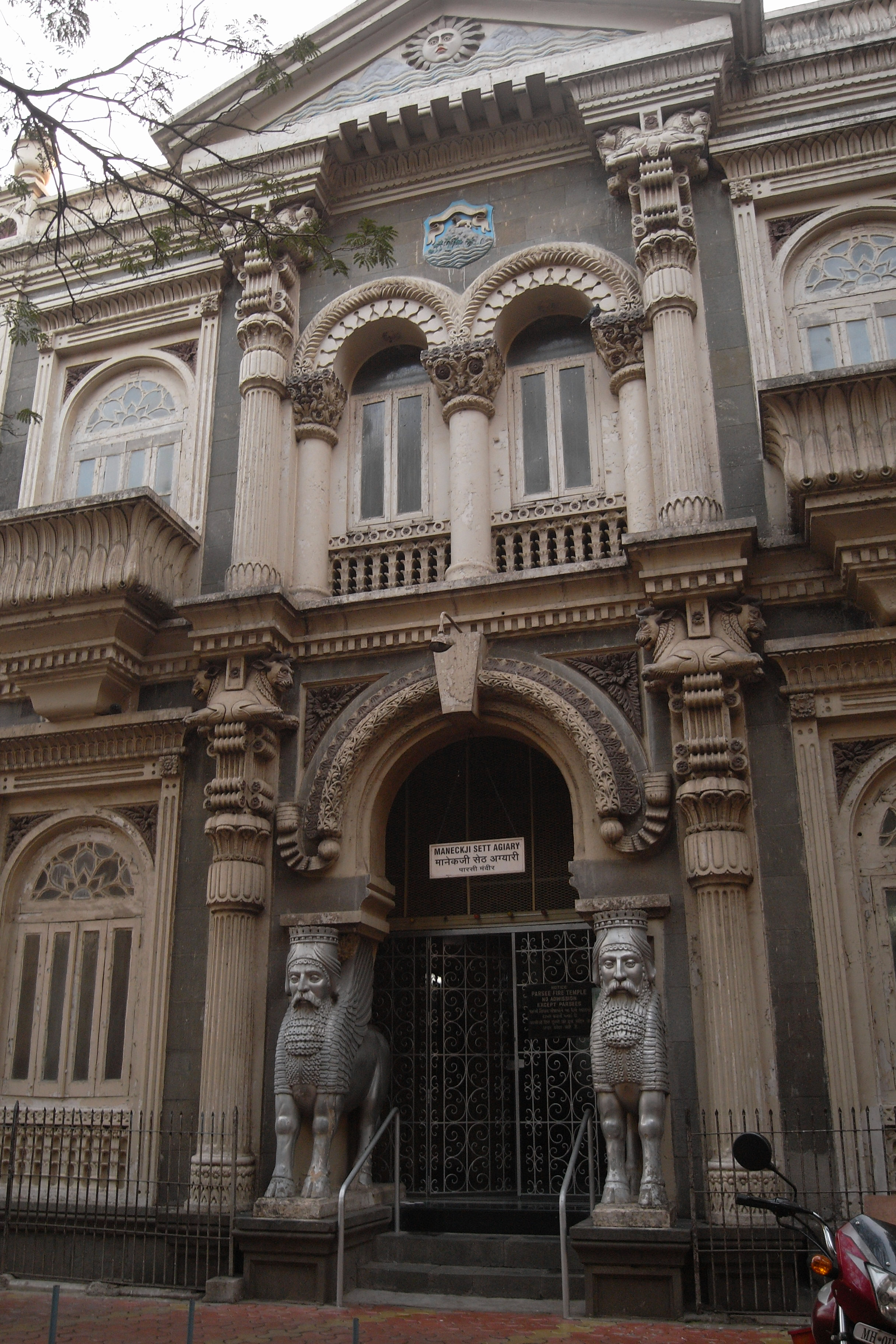
- Maneckji Seth Agiary, the second-oldest Zoroastrian fire temple in the city of Mumbai, 2009

Total population
- 61,000 (2012)

Founder
- Zarathustra

Regions with significant populations
- Primarily Gujarat and Maharashtra

Scriptures
- Avesta

Languages
- Gujarati, Hindi, and English

Zoroastrianism, an Iranian religion, has been present in India for thousands of years. Though it split into a separate branch, it shares a common origin with Hinduism and other Indian religions, having been derived from the Proto-Indo-Iranian religion. Though it was once the majority and official religion of the Iranian nation, Zoroastrianism eventually migrated to the Indian subcontinent in light of the Muslim conquest of Iran, which saw the Rashidun Caliphate annex the Sasanian Empire by 651 CE. Owing to the persecution of Zoroastrians in the post-Sasanian period, a large wave of Iranian migrants fled to India, where they became known as the Parsi people, who now represent India's oldest Zoroastrian community. Later waves of Zoroastrian immigration to India took place over the following centuries, with a spike in the number of these refugees occurring during the Safavid conversion of Iran to Shia Islam and again during the reign of the Qajar dynasty, whose persecution of Zoroastrians prompted many to flee to British India, where they became known as the Irani people. Though Zoroastrian, the Parsis and the Iranis are culturally, linguistically, and socially distinct from each other due to their inception in separate periods of migration.

The comparatively liberal atmosphere of India and the protection provided by historical Indian kingdoms to their Zoroastrian subjects enabled the religion to flourish outside of the Iranian plateau. Today, India is home to the largest Zoroastrian population in the world, and despite their overall low population number, Indian Zoroastrians have had a significant influence on India's economy, culture, politics and military, and also played a major role in the Indian independence movement.

== History ==
By 632 CE, Yazdegerd III came to power in Persia but the Rashidun army had already begun invading Persia. The Muslims defeated them at Nahavand and Yazdegerd was slain by a miller in Merv in 652, bringing an end to the Sasanian dynasty and with it Zoroastrianism's history as the official religion of Iran. While losing their religion and script along with some Sasanian historiographical literature, the language and culture essentially survived. Between the seventh and thirteenth century, political and social pressures resulted in ascendancy of Iranian Muslim over the Zoroastrians. With the conquests, Iranians gradually lost their predominant religion.

The Zoroastrians moved to India in successive migrations in the Islamic period. The initial migration following the conquest has been characterized as a religious persecution by invading Muslims. According to the account, the Zoroastrians suffered at their hands and in order to protect themselves and safeguard their religion, fled first to northern Iran, then to the island of Hormuz and finally to India. This generally accepted narrative of migration emphasises Muslim persecution while identifying Parsis as religious refugees. Recently, scholars have questioned this explanation of Iranian origins. There is a scarcity of sources about the migration. Historians are forced to rely exclusively on Qissa-i Sanjan written in 1599 by a Parsi Priest and Qissah-ye Zartushtian-e Hindustan written more than 200 years later. This is complicated by the fact that there were already Zoroastrians in India in the Sasanian period.

Iranian Zoroastrians are known to have been trading with India for centuries before the dates calculated for arrival of Parsis per Qissa-i Sanjan. Ruksana Nanji and Homi Dhalla while discussing archaeological evidence for 'The Landing of Zoroastrians at Sanjan', conclude that the most likely date for the migration at the start of the middle phase of their chronology, namely the early-to-mid-eighth century. Nevertheless, they express their general skepticism about the Qissa-i Sanjan account. Scholar Andre Wink has theorized that Zoroastrian immigrants to India, both before and after the Muslim conquest of Iran, were primarily merchants, since evidence suggests it was only some time after their arrival that religious experts and priests were sent for to join them. He argues that the competition over trade routes with Muslims may also have contributed to their immigration.

Although historically unsubstantiated, the story of how Zoroastrians gained permission to step on the shores of Gujarat continues to be critical to the self-identity of the group. Per the commonly told narrative, the Rajah of Sanjan, summoned them and demanded to know how they would not be a burden on or a threat to the local communities. Replying to their request of practising their religion and till the land, he showed them a jug full of milk, saying Sanjan like it was full. In one version, a dastur added a coin to the milk, saying like the coin, no one would be able to see that they were there but they would enrich the milk nonetheless. In another version, he added sugar instead and claimed that like it, they would sweeten lands of Sanjan. In both of them their settlement is approved by the Rajah who addresses certain conditions for it: they would explain their religion, promise not to proselytise, adopt Gujarati speech and dress, surrender their weapons and only conduct their rituals after nightfall. During this period, Zoroastrian traders faced execution outside India, including in Tang China where many were killed during the Guangzhou massacre.

The immigration of Zoroastrians to India continued, and by 1477 they had lost all contact with Persia. Not until three hundred years had passed would they come into contact. Zoroastrians also played a notable role during the freedom movements of India. There were also subsequent migrations, especially resulting from attempts of Safavids' to convert their subjects to Shia Islam in the sixteenth century. This added to the Parsi population and cemented their close association with Iran.

== Demographics ==
Historical population of Zoroastrians (Parsi) in India
Year	Pop.	±% p.a.
1872	69,476	—
1881	85,397	+2.32%
1891	89,904	+0.52%
1901	94,190	+0.47%
1911	100,096	+0.61%
1921	101,778	+0.17%
1931	109,752	+0.76%
1941	114,890	+0.46%
1971	91,266	−0.76%
1981	71,630	−2.39%
2001	69,601	−0.14%
2011	57,264	−1.93%

According to the 2011 Census of India, there are 57,264 Parsis in India, and the 2014 figures indicate there are now 69,000. These numbers do not include Irani people who identify themselves as Zoroastrians. The previous figure of Zoroastrians in the diaspora, and on the results of the Indian census of 1981, which counted over 71,630 Zoroastrians (Parsi). Independent estimates are that there are at least 100,000 Zoroastrians (Parsi) in India. Parsis' mother tongue is Gujarati.

The Zoroastrian community in India remains one of the most recognized groups, playing a part in various commercial sectors such as industry, movies, and politics.

Zoroastrian population in India (by district) according to the 2011 census
State	District	Total	Male	Female
Maharashtra	Nandurbar	6	2	4
Maharashtra	Dhule	12	7	5
Maharashtra	Jalgaon	111	60	51
Maharashtra	Akola	18	11	7
Maharashtra	Amravati	13	8	5
Maharashtra	Nagpur	540	266	274
Maharashtra	Bhandara	5	2	3
Maharashtra	Gondiya	1	1	0
Maharashtra	Chandrapur	4	1	3
Maharashtra	Nanded	6	3	3
Maharashtra	Jalna	12	6	6
Maharashtra	Aurangabad	39	21	18
Maharashtra	Nashik	468	220	248
Maharashtra	Thane	2339	1232	1107
Maharashtra	Mumbai Suburban	11348	5524	5824
Maharashtra	Mumbai	35209	16839	18370
Maharashtra	Raigarh	74	34	40
Maharashtra	Pune	4196	2114	2082
Maharashtra	Ahmednagar	100	51	49
Maharashtra	Solapur	100	53	47
Maharashtra	Satara	104	63	41
Maharashtra	Ratnagiri	4	2	2
Maharashtra	Kolhapur	7	5	2
Maharashtra	Sangli	11	7	4
Tamil Nadu	Tiruvallur	9	3	6
Tamil Nadu	Chennai	61	30	31

== Communities ==
There are two major Zoroastrian communities in India.

=== Parsi ===
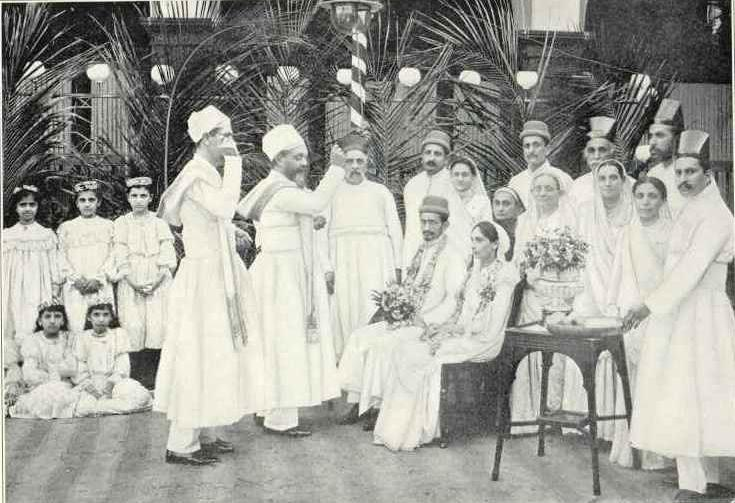
A Parsi wedding, 1905

The word Parsi in the Persian language literally means "Persian". Persian is the official language of modern Iran, which is also known as Persia. The language (Parsi) is commonly referred to as Farsi because after the Arab invasion of Persia, due to the absence of the p, g, zh, ch sounds in the Arabic language, Parsi became Farsi. Similarly, Babak Khorramdin's first name, originally Papak (papa + kuchak), 'young father', became Babak.

The long presence of the Parsis in the Gujarat and Sindh areas of India is supported by a genetic study and it also distinguishes them from the smaller Zoroastrian Indian community of Iranis, who are more recent arrivals.

=== Iranis ===
Although the term 'Irani' is first attested during the Mughal era, most Iranis are immigrants who arrived on the subcontinent during the 19th and early 20th centuries, that is, when Iran was ruled by the Qajars and when religious persecution of non-Muslims was rampant. The descendants of the immigrants of those times remain culturally and linguistically closer to the Zoroastrians of Iran, in particular to the Zoroastrians of Yazd and Kerman. Consequently, the Dari dialect of the Zoroastrians of those provinces may be heard among the Iranis.

== See also ==
- List of countries by Zoroastrian population
- Indo-Sasanian Kingdom
- List of fire temples in India
- Achaemenid conquest of the Indus Valley
