= Atash Behram =

Highest grade of a fire in a Zoroastrian fire temple

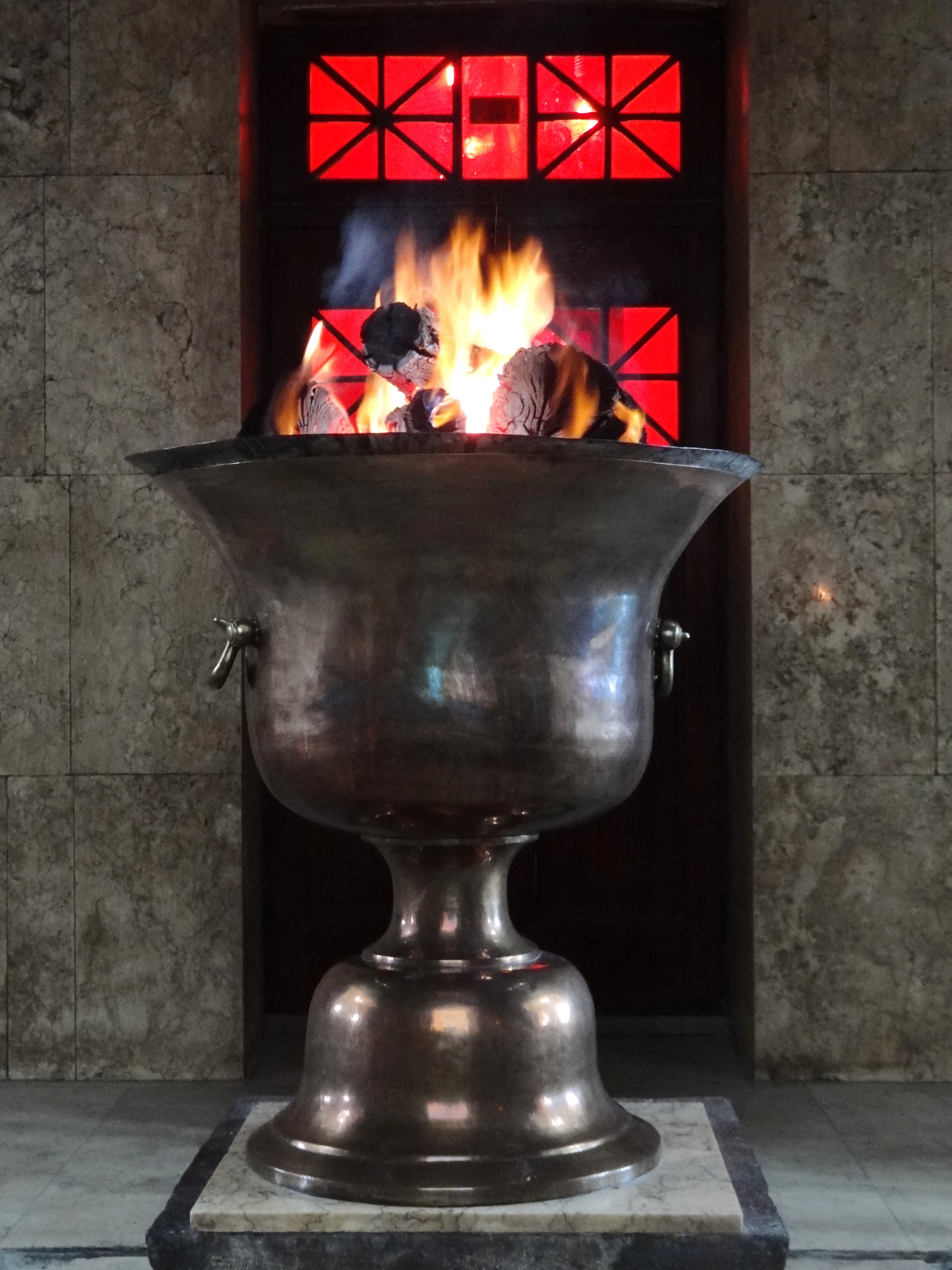
Atash Behram at the Fire Temple of Yazd in Iran

An Atash Behram (Fire of Victory) is the highest grade of fire that can be placed in a Zoroastrian fire temple as an eternal flame. The other two lower graded fires are Atash Adaran and below Adaran is the Atash Dadgah; these three grades signify the degree of reverence and dignity these are held in. The establishment and consecration of the Atash Behram fire is the most elaborate of all the grades of fire. It involves the gathering of 16 different types of fire, including fire by lightning (i.e. gathering up any branch of tree ignited by a lightning strike), fire from a cremation pyre, fire from trades where a furnace is operated, and fires from the hearths, as is also the case for the Atash Adaran. Each of the 16 fires is then subject to a purification ritual before it joins the others. A large team of priests is required for the purification and consecration ceremonies, which can take up to a year to complete.

The religious significance of gathering purifying and consecrating several fires is to purify and return to Ahura Mazda his first pure creation in its pristine form, to become a focus of worship and his eternal pure symbol, never allowed to go out. The sacred fire at Udvada Atash Behram, for example, kindled in 721 CE in Sanjan, burns continually to this day, now in Udvada since 1741, and housed in a Persian style temple building since 1742.

== Types of fire, its purification and consecration ==
The 16 types of fire required for an Atash Behram are:

1. Fire used in burning a corpse
2. The fire used by a dyer
3. The fire from a house of a king or a ruling authority
4. Fire from a potter
5. Fire from a brick-maker
6. Fire from an ascetic
7. Fire from a goldsmith
8. Fire from a mint
9. Fire from an ironsmith
10. Fire from an armourer
11. Fire from a baker
12. Fire from a brewer
13. Fire from a soldier
14. Fire from a shepherd
15. Fire produced by atmospheric lightning
16. Fire from the house of a Zoroastrian: what is actually done is fire is collected from the houses of a dastur (high priest/senior priest) a mobad, and a layman. A natural fire is also kindled by striking two flint stones and the spark igniting some sandalwood. This last fire is kept with the 16th fire.

Whereas fires from the professions listed above is obtained by a Zoroastrian layman or priest approaching the person and requesting he be allowed to collect burning embers from the fire, in the case of fire from a burning corpse, the Zoroastrian waits for the corpse to burn down, then with a metal ladle, with a handle at least three feet in length, he fills the ladle with sandalwood or other inflammable wood filings; these ignite by heat from the burning embers of the pyre, the person making sure the ladle does not touch the hot embers of the funeral pyre.

In the case of fire from atmospheric lightning, the Zoroastrian community of the region will approach neighboring townsfolk and villagers well in advance of the purification ceremony – from months up to a year – to look out for lightning strikes on trees or plants, and to take up a portion of the burning embers of the fire if so produced, which are then transferred as soon as possible by ladle to the assigned priests to begin the elaborate work of consecration.

The ceremony of consecrating the other fires need not be delayed for this fire; however, if the fire produced by lightning has not come forth by the time all the other fires have been consecrated, the final union and consecration of all the fires cannot take place. It must be indefinitely postponed until this fire is produced and consecrated.

The 16 fires so collected are taken through an elaborate process of purification. In the case of the fire from a funeral pyre, the process of purification is repeated for 91 times by holding a ladle filled with sandalwood filings and frankincense 15 inches over the fire and igniting the contents in the ladle - this is repeated by igniting a fresh fire from the previous one, each time igniting a fresh fire, the previous one allowed to die out, each new fire is placed in a new pit or in a fresh metal vase; this is repeated 91 times, the 91st fire is then ready for consecration. In case of fire from lightning this process is done for 90 times, similarly on fire obtained from a dyer this purificatory process is done 80 times, from fire obtained from king's palace 70 times, on fire from a potter 61 times, from a brick maker for 75 times, on fire from an ascetic 50 times, on fire from goldsmith 60 times, from the mint 55 times, from ironsmith, armourer and baker and brewer 61 times each, from fire obtained from warriors home 35 times, from a shepherd's home 33 times and fire from home of a high priest 44 times, the fire obtained by striking two flints the purificatory is repeated 144 times, the last fire of each of 16 fires thus purified as result from the set number of times shown here, and the final 16 purified fires are ready for consecration.

Each of these purified 16 fires is assigned to a team of priests who have all undergone the Bareshnum purification ceremony. The prayers recited over these fires first begin by going through basic prayers such as the kushti Sarosh Baj the Gah prayers, and then a Yasna liturgy (which contain the Gathas sacred poems said to have been composed by the prophet Zarathustra and thus the most sacred ) as well as a Videvdad liturgy are performed over the fires the same number of times as the purification numbers of each fire.

On the purified fire drawn from a funeral pyre, these Yasnas and Videvdad are recited in the following traditional pattern: for the first three days these prayers are dedicated to and invoked in the name of Ahura Mazda, then the next two sets of Zoroastrian calendar thirty days these prayers are dedicated to Ahura Mazda and the six Amesha Spentas and 23 Yazatas and in the third month prayers are said for only 28 days (to Ahura Mazda, the six Amesha Spentas and up to Zamyad Yazad, (Yazata of the 28th day) thus totalling 91 times in 91 days (3+30+30+28=91).

Similarly, in the now purified fire from lightning the same set of prayers are done for 90 days as 3+30+30+27 days but first three days dedicated to Daep Meher Yazata, then two months of 30 days beginning with Daep Meher and ending with day of Geush Yazata, and then 27 days these liturgies ending with day dedicated on the 27th day to Khurshed Yazata; on fire obtained from a dyer which was purified 80 times, 80 days prayers as detailed above would cover 3 days dedicated to the second Amesha Spenta Vohuman then two months totalling 60 days to all 30 divinities and the third month prayers would be recited for the balance 17 days ending with day dedicated to Rashna Yazata. (3+30+30+17 days=80 times.) Applying the same pattern to the purified fire from fire obtained from the king, consecration involve prayers over 70 times which would be three days prayers dedicated to the third Amesha Spenta Asha Vahista (Ardibehsth) then two sets of 30 day months dedicated to 30 divinities and the balance of only seven days ending with the day dedicated to Adar Amesha Spenta, totalling 70 days of prayer. (3+30+30+7=70)

Similar formulae as detailed are applied to the rest of the 16 purified fires; for example, to the purified fire from the house of a priest, the prayers are recited for 3+30 full month days+ 11 days of second month, totalling to 44 recitations of the Yasna and Videvdad for 44 days, corresponding to the 44 times this fire was purified.

These 16 purified and consecrated fires, which until the last day of the year (the Zoroastrian calendar has 12 months of 30 days each, the last five days piously dedicated to the five Gathas) are kept separate and kept burning with sandalwood and frankincense. On the first Gatha day the final ceremony of combining the 16 fires and consecration of this begins with the recitation in the dawn part of the Ushahin Geh (this Geh begins at midnight and up to the first sign of dawn the next morning.)

Now, the 16 fires are, beginning with the consecrated fire from the fire from the funeral pyre, ceremoniously gathered into a large censer by priests who have undergone the Bareshnum especially for this purpose, and then for the next three days Yasna and Videvdad are recited in honour of Sarosh Yazata, the great Yazata who since creation is assigned to protect Ahura Mazda's creation every night. Thereafter for next thirty days these set of liturgy, Yasna, Videvdad, and the mandatory prayers are recited before the assembled fire, each day in honour of the Yazata that presides over that day.

Now this great Atash Behram fire is considered a king and on the day which the founders, who can be an individual or a family or combined people of the place called Anjuman, have decided to enthrone the fire in its consecrated room within temple, it is carried there in a procession with pomp headed by the High Priest and placed on the large censer in the center of the consecrated room. The first Boi reciting the Atash Niyash (the liturgy in honour of Adar Yazata who presides over all Fires) is performed, and the great ritual that lasted a year or more ends with a few days of performing Jashans of thanksgivings and merriment amongst Zoroastrians of the place (refer J J Modi The Religious Ceremonies and Customs of the Parsis now also available in Avesta.org).

== List of Atash Behrams ==
This is a list of the nine Atash Behrams which still survive today.

Image	Name	Location	Year Established
	Iranshah Atash Behram	Udvada	1742
	Desai Atash Behram	Navsari	1765
	Dadiseth Atash Behram	Mumbai	1783
	Modi Atash Behram	Surat	1823
	Vakil Atash Behram	Surat	1823
	Wadia Atash Behram	Mumbai	1830
	Banaji Atash Behram	Mumbai	1845
	Anjuman Atash Behram	Mumbai	1897
	Yazd Atash Behram	Yazd	1934
