= Fire Temple of Yazd =

Zoroastrian fire temple in Yazd, Iran

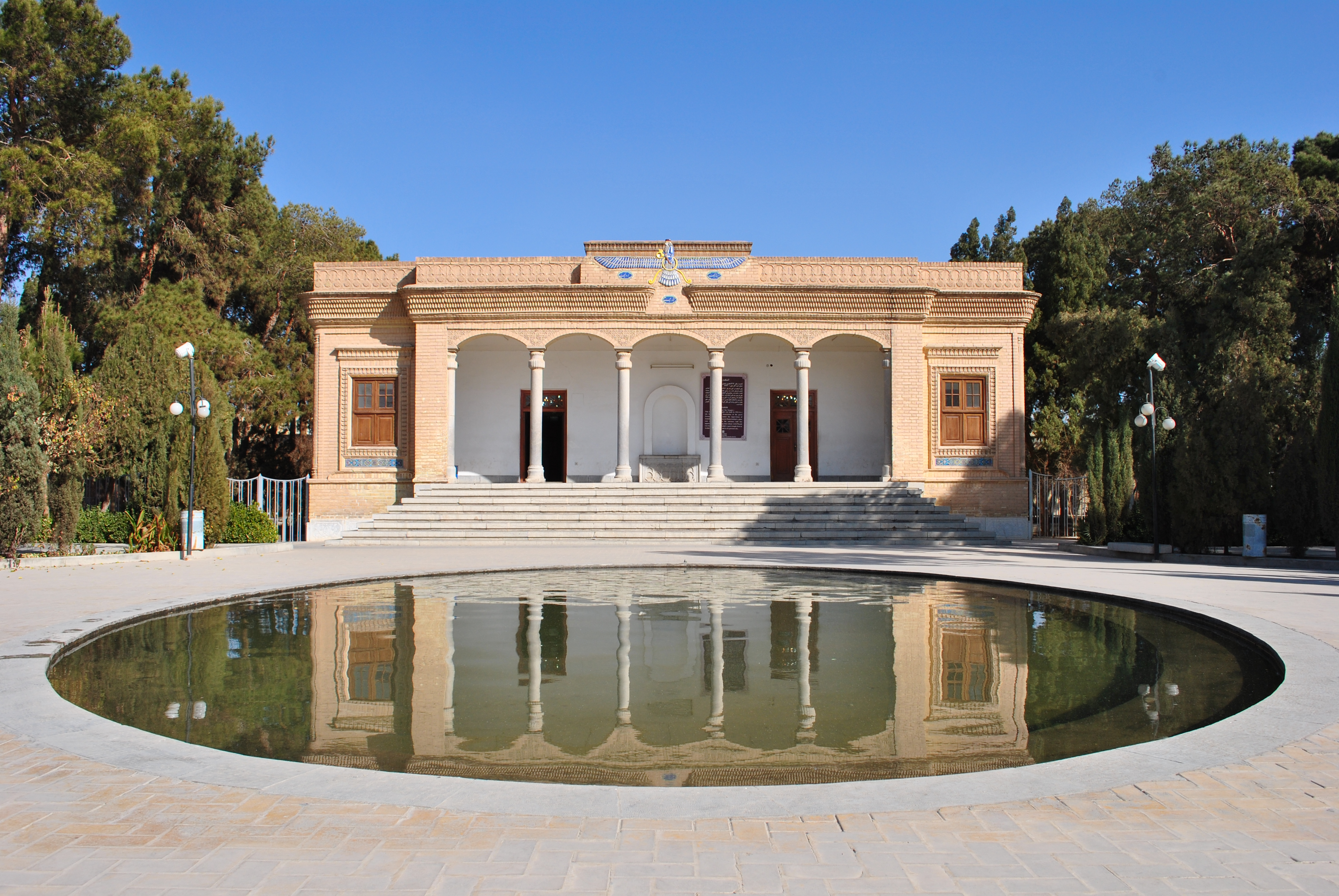
- Yazd Atash Behram

- Location within Iran

Religion
- Affiliation: Zoroastrian
- Status: Active

Location
- Location: Yazd, Yazd province
- Country: Iran
- Coordinates: 31°54′20″N 54°20′21″E

Architecture
- Founder: Jamshid Amanat
- Groundbreaking: 1934

The Fire Temple of Yazd (Persian: آتشکدهٔ یزد, romanized: Ātaškade-ye Yazd), also known as Yazd Atash Behram (Persian: آتش بهرام یزد, romanized: Ātaš-e Bahrām-e Yazd), is a Zoroastrian fire temple in Yazd, Yazd province, Iran. It enshrines the Atash Behram, meaning "Victorious Fire", dated to 470 AD. It is one of the nine Atash Behrams, the only one of the highest-grade fires in Iran, where Zoroastrians have practiced their religion since 400 BC; the other eight Atash Behrams are in India. According to Aga Rustam Noshiravan Belivani, of Sharifabad, the Anjuman-i Nasiri (elected Zoroastrian officials) opened the Yazd Atash Behram in the 1960s to non-Zoroastrian visitors.

Veneration of fire has its roots in the older practice of keeping a hearth fire burning continually—especially during the bitterly cold winters so characteristic of the steppes of Central Asia, when the early Indo-European-speaking peoples led a nomadic life in which fire was a source of warmth, light and comfort. As time passed, the Iranians began to address fire as Atas Yazata ("fire divinity"), while rewarding it with offerings in return for its constant help. The ceremony accompanying recitation of the Yasna Haptanghaiti seems to originate in pre-Zoroastrian times when priests would offer libations to fire and water.

== Background ==
The temple is located in Yazd to the east of Shiraz, in the desert province of Yazda, where Zoroastrians have practiced their religion since about 400 BC. It is located on Ayatullah Kashani Avenue and is 6 kilometres (3.7 mi) away from Yazd Airport.

The highest grade of fire temples were first constructed in the Sasanian Empire for the reverence of fire, which is the manifestation of Ahura Mazda in the Zoroastrian religion. According to the Zoroastrian religion, this type of fire is consecrated by sixteen different sources, including the fire created by a lightning bolt.

== History ==
According to an inscription plaque fixed on the shrine, the construction of the Yazd Atash Behram temple is dated to 1934. The funds for building it were provided by the Association of the Parsi Zoroastrians of India. Construction was done under the guidance of Jamshid Amanat. The sacred fire of the temple is stated to have been burning since about 470 AD; originally started by the Sassanian Shah when it was in the Pars Karyan fire temple in southern Pars district of Larestan. From there it was transferred to Aqda, where it was kept for 700 years. The fire was then moved in 1173 to Nahid-e Pars temple in nearby Ardakan, where it remained for 300 years until it was moved again to the house of a high priest in Yazd, and was finally consecrated in the new temple in 1934.

A bust of Maneckji Limji Hataria who was instrumental in raising funds for building the temple, has been installed in the precincts of the temple. The bust also displays the Zoroastrian divine symbols of the Sun and the Moon.

== Features ==
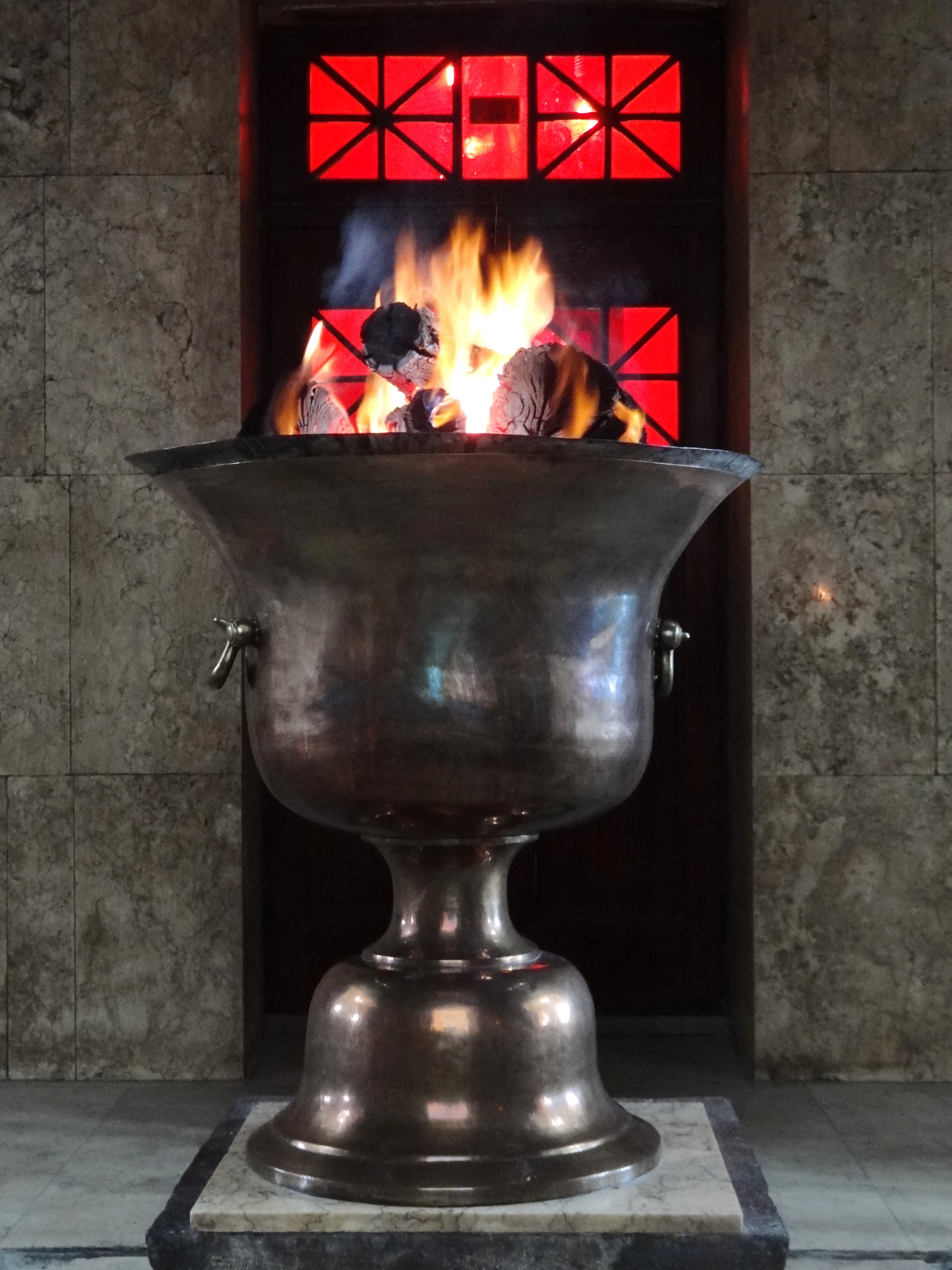
Zoroastrian eternal flame at the Fire Temple of Yazd, Central Iran

The fire temple is built in Achaemenid architecture style in brick masonry to the design prepared by the architects from Bombay. It is similar in design to the Atash Behram temples in India. The building is surrounded by a garden which has fruit trees. There is a winged deity of the Ahura Mazda embedded on the front door of the temple.

The sacred fire is installed in the temple behind an amber tinted glass enclosure. Only Zoroastrians are allowed to go to the sanctum area of the fire. Non-Zoroastrians can only view it from outside the glass chamber. The Anjuman-i Nasiri opened the Yazd Atash Behram in the 1960s to non-Zoroastrian visitors. This sacred fire (also known as Behram Fire) is the longest burning flame in Iran. It was kindled more than 1,500 years ago, it is still burning and it has never died down.

The Zoroastrians' fire temple was completed by Persian architecture in 1936 and finally in 1939, this 1547 year old fire was transferred to the fire temple. The fire of the Yazd fire temple is from Bahram fire (the specific fire of Sassanid kings) that doubled its importance.

It was customary to have a spring or stream nearby to a fire temple so that all four elements (earth, fire, water, air) could be together. However, since the Yazd fire temple was not near to either a spring or stream, a pool was constructed. At prayer times, you see the bright dressed men and women entering the fire temple with bare feet (without shoes).

The holy fire of the fire temple is in a large bronze furnace, and a person named “Hirbod” is responsible to keep it. This eternal fire can now be watched by visitors separated from it by a glass wall.

== Photo gallery ==
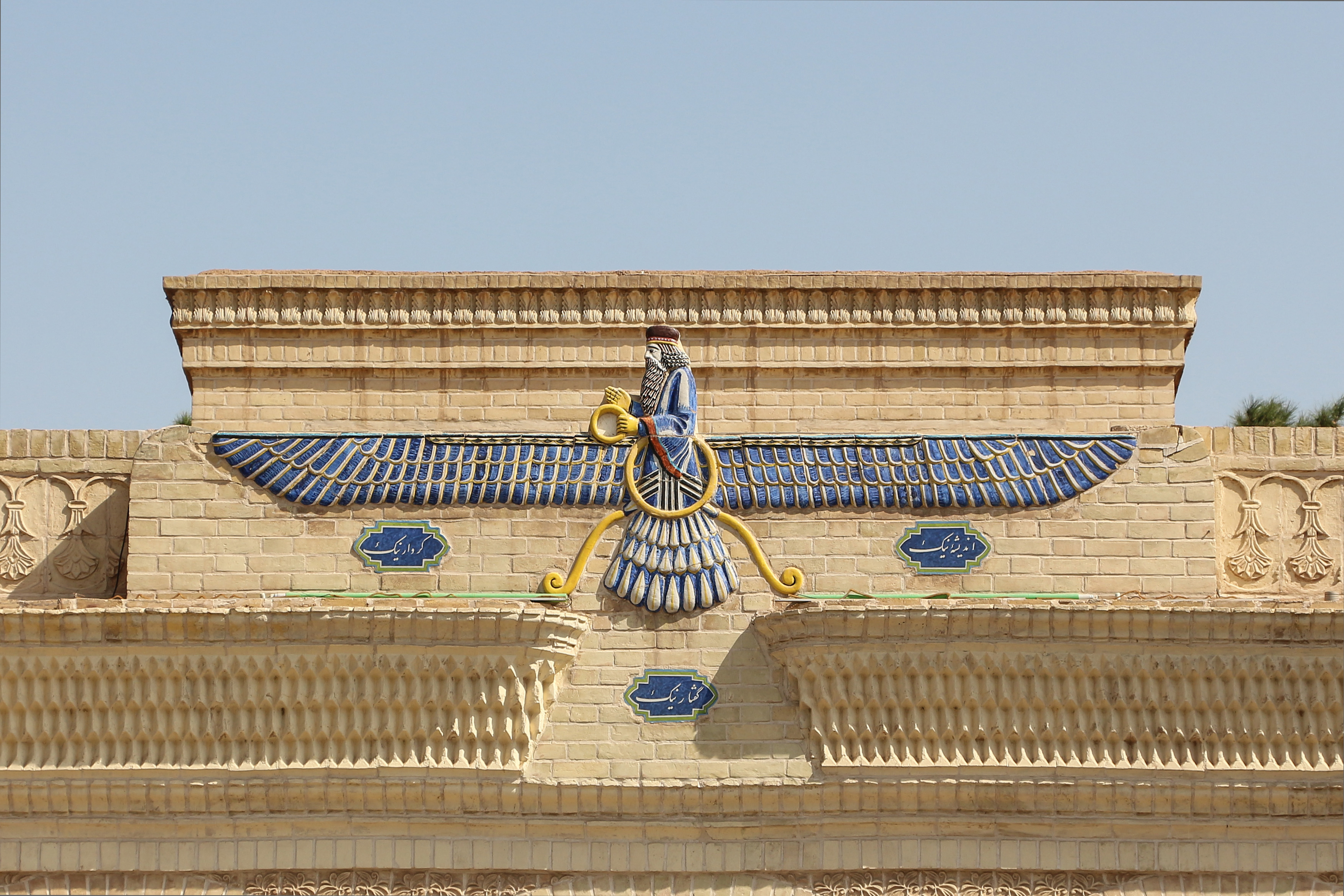
Faravahar on the fire temple

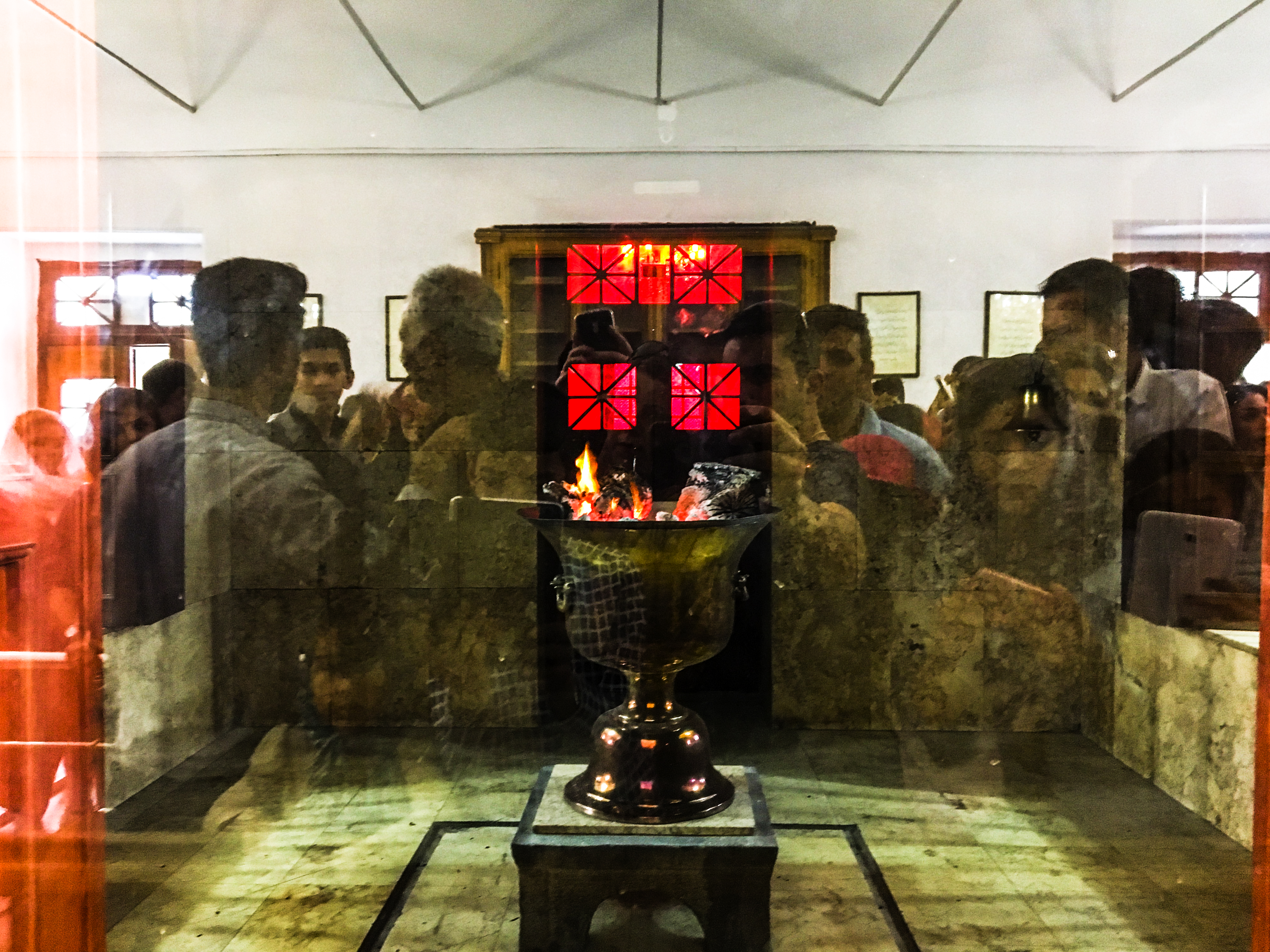
Zoroastrian eternal flame at the fire temple

== Bibliography ==
- Ejaz, Khadija (23 December 2010). In the Persian Empire. Mitchell Lane Publishers, Incorporated. ISBN 978-1-61228-025-7.
- Giara, Marzban Jamshedji (2002). Global Directory of Zoroastrian Fire Temples. Marzban J. Giara.
- Godrej, Pheroza; Mistree, Firoza Punthakey (2002). A Zoroastrian Tapestry: Art, Religion & Culture. Mapin Pub. ISBN 978-81-85822-71-6.
- Karber, Phil (18 June 2012). Fear and Faith in Paradise: Exploring Conflict and Religion in the Middle East. Rowman & Littlefield Publishers. ISBN 978-1-4422-1479-8.
- Rogerson, Barnaby (7 November 2013). Rogerson's Book of Numbers: The culture of numbers from 1001 Nights to the Seven Wonders of the World. Profile Books. ISBN 978-1-84765-983-5.
- Warden, P. (2002). Parsiana. Vol. 25. Bombay: P. Warden.
