= Maneckji Seth Agiary =

Zoroastrian fire temple in Mumbai, India

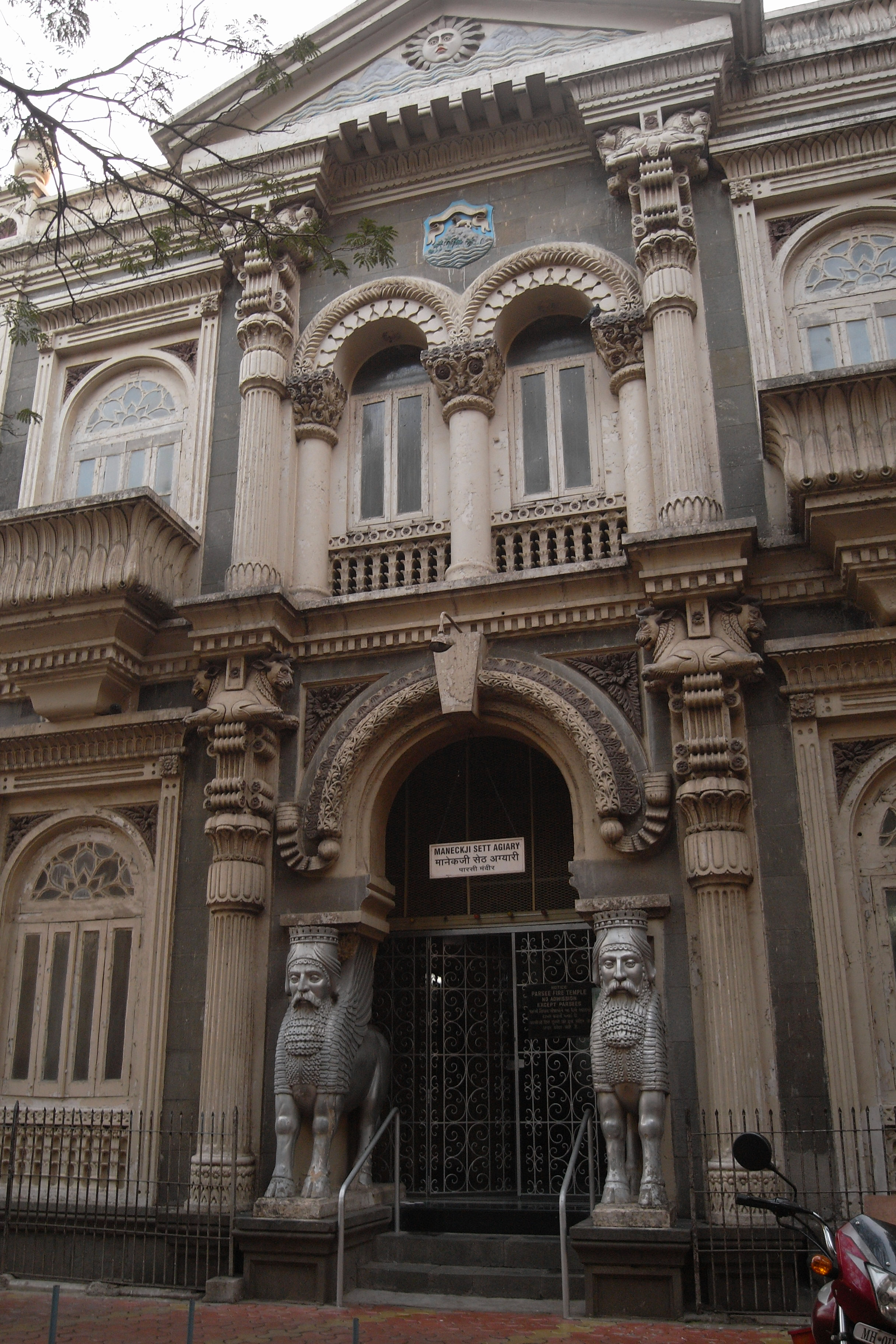
The facade of the temple shows a mix of Persian architecture and Greek Revival style.

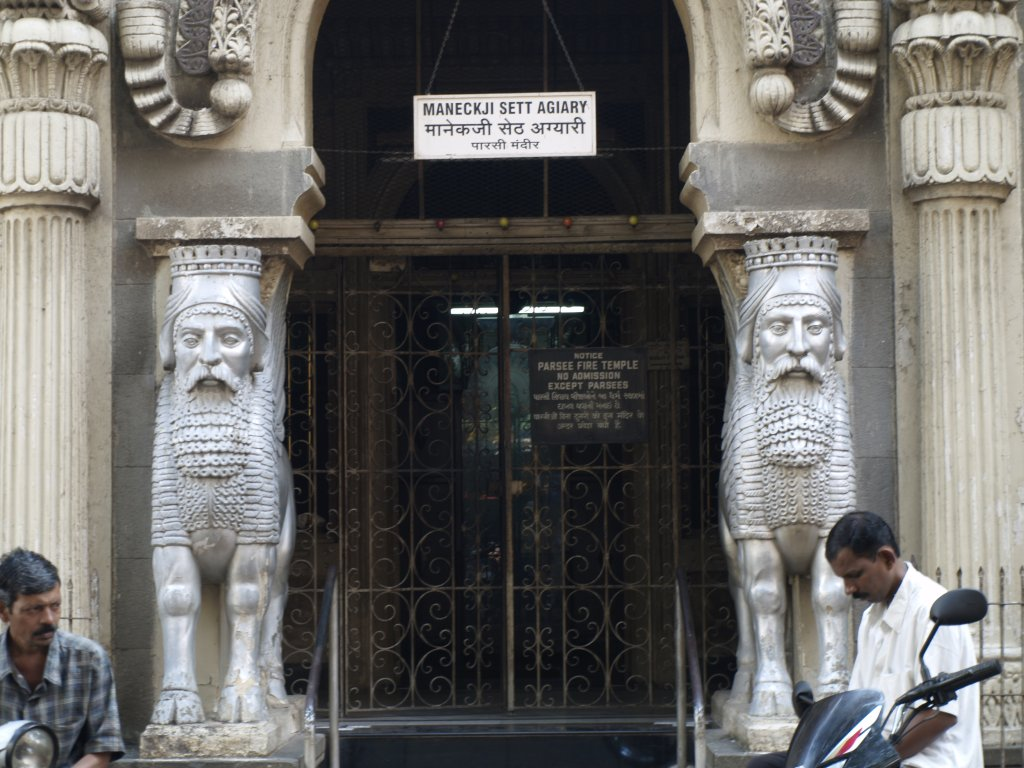
The lamassus at the entrance.

Maneckji Seth Agiary is the second-oldest Zoroastrian fire temple (or agiary, Gujarati for "house of fire") in Mumbai, India, constructed in 1735. Banaji Limji Agiary, established in 1709, is the oldest. As in all Zoroastrian temples, non-Parsis are not allowed to enter. The architecture of the building is a mix of Persian and Greek Revival styles, with two lamassus standing guard at the temple entrance.

== See also ==
- List of fire temples in India
