= Tehemton Erach Udwadia =

Indian surgeon and gastroenterologist (1934–2023)

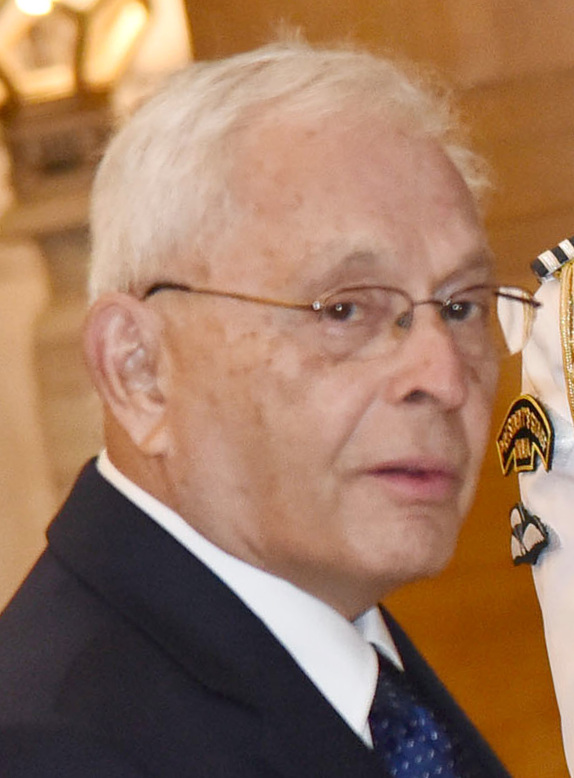
- Udwadia in 2017
- Born: 15 July 1934; Bombay, Bombay Presidency, British India
- Died: 7 January 2023 (aged 88); Mumbai, Maharashtra, India
- Occupation: Gastroenterologist
- Known for: Gastroenterology
- Parent(s): Erach Rustomji; Perin Erach
- Awards: Padma Shri; Padma Bhushan; Dr. B. C. Roy Award; SAGES Millennium Award; IAGES Lifetime Achievement Award

Tehemton Erach Udwadia (15 July 1934 – 7 January 2023) was an Indian surgeon and gastroenterologist, considered by many as the father of laparoscopic surgery in India. He was a general surgeon at two Mumbai hospitals, Breach Candy Hospital and Hinduja Hospital and was the founder president of the Indian Association of Gastrointestinal Endo-Surgeons. The Government of India awarded him the fourth highest civilian honour of the Padma Shri, in 2006 and the third highest civilian honour of the Padma Bhushan in 2017 for his contributions to Indian medicine. He has shared his experience through his book- More than just surgery.

== Biography ==
Born in a Parsi family originating from Udvada to Erach Rustomji and Perin Erach on 15 July 1934 in Mumbai, the capital city of the western Indian state of Maharashtra, Udwadia did his early education at St. Mary's School, Mumbai and Wilson College, Mumbai. He graduated in medicine from Mumbai University and started his career as a research fellow at the King Edward Memorial Hospital and Seth Gordhandas Sunderdas Medical College in 1958, where he stayed till 1962. During this period, he studied for the postgraduate degree (MS) at the same institution, securing it in 1960. Moving to Grant Medical College and Sir Jamshedjee Jeejeebhoy Group of Hospitals in 1963, he worked there till 1994 till his superannuation and continued his association with the institution as an emeritus professor. In between, he also worked as a Hunterian Professor of the Royal College of Surgeons of England during 1984–85 and Sir James Ross Lecturer at the Royal College of Surgeons of Edinburgh in 1992.

Udwadia was the founder president of the Indian Association of Gastrointestinal Endo-Surgeons and presided over the association from 1993 to 1998. He has served as the president of the Society of Gastrointestinal Endoscopy of India, Association of Surgeons of India and the Society of Endoscopic and Laparoscopic Surgeons of Asia. He has been the president of the Indian chapter and the World body of the International College of Surgeons. He has published over 90 articles in peer reviewed journals and is the author of two books, Laparoscopic Cholecystectomy and Laparoscopic Surgery in Developing Countries.

Udwadia received the SAGES Millennium Award from the Society of American Gastrointestinal Endoscopic Surgeons in 2000. The same year, he was awarded the Dr. B. C. Roy Award, the highest Indian award in the medical category, from the Medical Council of India. The Indian Association of Gastrointestinal Endo-Surgeons awarded him the Lifetime Achievement Award in 2004. In 2006 he was awarded the civilian award of the Padma Shri from the Government of India In 2018, he became a laureate of the Asian Scientist 100 by the Asian Scientist.

Udwadia died on 7 January 2023, at the age of 88.
