= Farokh Udwadia =

Indian physician and author

Farokh Udwadia is an Indian physician, author and Padma Bhusan award recipient. He graduated from the University of Bombay (MBBS) with a Distinction in Medicine and several other subjects in 1953. He received his MD from the University of Bombay in 1956 (where he graduated as valedictorian). He completed his advanced training at the Brompton Hospital and Middlesex Hospital, London and was on the house staff of City Hospital and Northern General Hospital, Edinburgh, in Professor Sir John Crofton's Unit. He is an elected fellow of the National Academy of Medical Sciences.
