= Bordi =

Village in Maharashtra

Bordi Bordi
- village
- Location in Maharashtra, India Bordi (India)
- Coordinates: 20.1165562°N 72.7400099°E
- Country: India
- State: Maharashtra
- District: Palghar
- Taluka: Dahanu
- Elevation: 12 m (39 ft)

Population (2011)
  - Total: 7,682
- Time zone: UTC+5:30 (IST)
- 2011 census code: 551577

Bordi is a coastal village in the Palghar district of Maharashtra, India. It is located in Dahanu taluka. It is a tourist destination due to its beach and natural environment. It is also famous for the chikoo fruit and has many chikoo farms. A festival named chikoo festival also takes place in Bordi.

== Demographics ==
According to the 2011 census of India, Bordi has 1647 households. The effective literacy rate (i.e. the literacy rate of population excluding children aged 6 and below) is 87.71%.

Demographics (2011 Census)
	Total	Male	Female
Population	7682	4122	3560
Children aged below 6 years	617	327	290
Scheduled caste	642	323	319
Scheduled tribe	2495	1271	1224
Literates	6197	3472	2725
Workers (all)	3035	1963	1072
Main workers (total)	2838	1873	965
Main workers: Cultivators	244	179	65
Main workers: Agricultural labourers	546	302	244
Main workers: Household industry workers	164	91	73
Main workers: Other	1884	1301	583
Marginal workers (total)	197	90	107
Marginal workers: Cultivators	23	9	14
Marginal workers: Agricultural labourers	27	6	21
Marginal workers: Household industry workers	27	6	21
Marginal workers: Others	120	69	51
Non-workers	4647	2159	2488
