= Bonnerjee =

Bonnerjee is a Bengali surname that may refer to the following notable people:

- Debina Bonnerjee (born 1983), Indian actress
- Womesh Chunder Bonnerjee (1844–1906), Indian barrister
- Susila Anita Bonnerjee (died 1920), Indian doctor, educator and suffragist

== See also ==
- Banerjee
