= Meher Naoroji =

Indian medical doctor (1881–1974)

- Naoroji at her graduation from the University of Edinburgh in 1906.
- Born: 10 October 1881; Bombay
- Died: 15 April 1974 (aged 92); Bhuj
- Education: University of Edinburgh (MB ChB, 1906); Edinburgh College of Medicine for Women
- Occupation: Physician
- Known for: The first Indian woman to graduate with a medical degree from the University of Edinburgh
- Relatives: Dadabhai Naoroji (grandfather); Perin Captain (sister); Khurshedben Naoroji (sister)

Meher Ardeshir Dadabhai Naoroji (1881–1974), also known as Meherbano Naoroji, was an Indian physician and the first Indian woman to graduate with a medical degree from the University of Edinburgh. She was the granddaughter of Dadabhai Naoroji, an Indian political leader and scholar, who was a founding member of the Indian National Congress and the first person of Asian descent elected to the British Parliament.

== Early life and education ==
Naoroji was born on 10 October 1881 in Bombay (now Mumbai), into a prominent Gujarati-speaking Parsi Zoroastrian family. She was the eldest of eight children born to Ardeshir Naoroji, a physician, and Virbai Dadina. Her paternal ancestors belonged to the Dordi family of Navsari, a lineage of Zoroastrian priests who prospered under the Mughal Empire.

In October 1893, when Naoroji was twelve years old, her father died of a heart attack. Following his death, the family divided their time between Bhuj and Bombay.

Naoroji's paternal grandfather, Dadabhai Naoroji, resided in London during much of her childhood and maintained correspondence with the family. As a strong advocate of women's education, he encouraged his granddaughters to pursue the same educational opportunities as his grandsons.

The pediment of Minto House, where Naoroji studied, showing the faded lettering of "School of Medicine"

In 1901, Naoroji enrolled at the University of Edinburgh to study medicine, supported by a scholarship from the royal Jadeja dynasty of Kutch. During her studies she attended Edinburgh College of Medicine for Women, based at Minto House. She was among at least 20 women born in India who attended the college, which trained a total of 185 students between 1889 and 1908. On 27 July 1906, she graduated with degrees of Bachelor of Medicine and Bachelor of Surgery (MB ChB), becoming the first Indian woman to receive a medical degree from the University of Edinburgh, rather than qualifying through the Scottish Triple Qualification.

Naoroji's younger sisters, Perin, Gosi and Khurshedben also pursued higher education in Europe, reflecting the family's emphasis on women's education.

== Medical career ==
Following her graduation and qualification as a physician in 1906, Naoroji returned to India, where she initially practised medicine in Karachi, then part of British India. She subsequently returned to Bhuj at the request of her benefactors, the ruling Jadeja dynasty of Kutch, who sought a 'lady doctor' to provide medical care in the region. Naoroji remained in Bhuj, where she continued to practise medicine for the rest of her life.

Although described as a recluse, Naoroji maintained close ties with descendants of the Jadeja dynasty, including Kumar Shri Duleepsinhji. According to Duleepsinhji, Naoroji was a strict, disciplined and conscientious physician who arrived at her clinic at 6 a.m. each morning and treated patients regardless of their social status. She has also been recognised for her commitment to providing medical care to women in the region.

Naoroji died on 15 April 1974 in Bhuj.
