= William Mainwaring (disambiguation) =

William Mainwaring (1884–1971) was a Welsh miner, trade unionist and politician.

William Mainwaring may also refer to:

- William Mainwaring (English politician) (1735–1821), MP for Middlesex 1784–1802
- Billy Mainwaring (William Thomas Mainwaring), Welsh rugby union player
- William Massey-Mainwaring, Irish art collector and politician
- William Mainwaring, governor of Hudson's Bay Company (1807–1812)
