= Dastur =

Zoroastrian cleric of the highest order

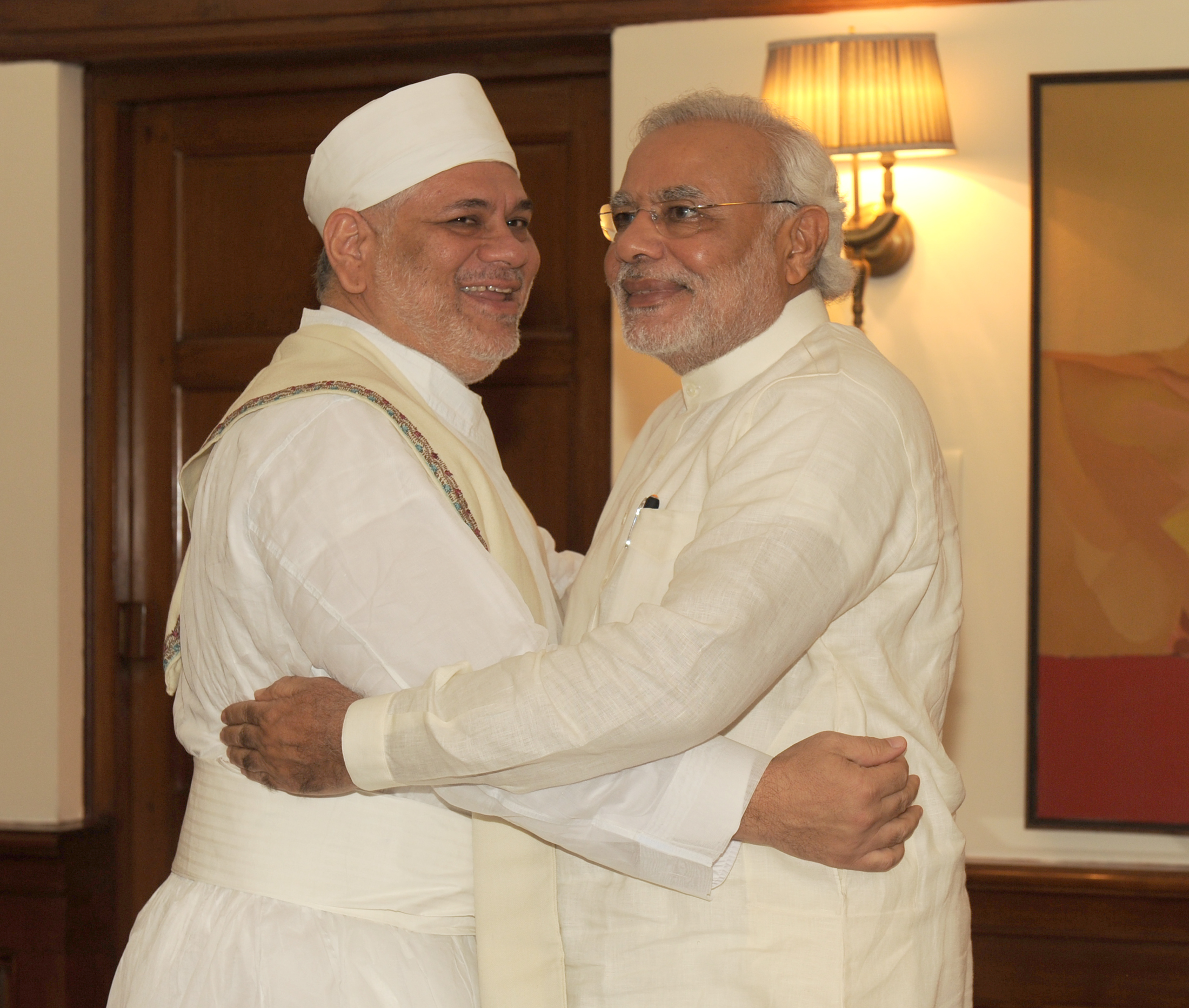
Dastur Khurshed Kaikobad Dastoor calling on the Prime Minister of India, 2014

A dastur (/dəˈstʊər/ də-STOOR), sometimes spelt dustoor, is a term for a Zoroastrian high priest who has authority in religious matters and ranks higher than a mobad or herbad. In this specific sense, the term is used mostly among the Parsis of India. The term has also been used in a secular sense to refer to a prime minister, minister or government councillor.

The first person to be accorded the title Dastur was Meherji Rana (born 1514 at Navsari). He was invited by Akbar to his court in 1578 AD. He was accorded the title in 1579 AD by the local Zoroastrian priests thus establishing a seat (Gaddi, similar to the seat of a Bhattaraka or Sankaracharya).

Dastur Kaikhushru Cowasji Ravji became the eighteenth successor to the seat and title of Meherji Rana in 2019. He became a Mobed 59 years earlier.

== Sources ==
- Boyce, Mary (2001). Zoroastrians, Their Religious Beliefs and Practices. London: Routledge
