= Kuched =

- village
- Location in Gujarat, India Kuched (India)
- Coordinates: 21.0267196819°N 73.0006075897°E
- Country: India
- State: Gujarat
- District: Navsari
- Elevation: 68 m (223 ft)

Population
  - Total: 250

Languages
  - Official: Gujarati, Hindi
- Time zone: UTC+5:30 (IST)
- PIN: 396475
- Telephone code: 91-2637
- Vehicle registration: GJ21*
- Website: kuchedusa.com

Kuched is a small village in the Jalalpur Taluka, Navsari district in the state of Gujarat, India. Kuched has a big oak tree that covers the entrance of the village and has since become the symbol of the village.

Prior to Independence in year 1947, Kuched was part of State of Gaikwad in the District of Navsari.

It is about 12 km Northwest of Navsari. Surat Airport is the nearest airport. Navsari Railway Station is the nearest railhead.

== Geography ==
Most of the residents rely on farming as their main source of income.
