= Mahadev R. Desai =

- Born: Navsari, Gujarat
- Education: Maharaja Sayajirao University of Baroda
- Known for: Vanche Gujarat (Read Gujarat) honorary secretary under chairmanship of then Chief Minister of Gujarat Shri Narendra Modi

Mahadev R. Desai is the president of the Sayaji Vaibhav Public Library Navsari. He was the Honorary Secretary of the Vanche Gujarat campaign of the government of Gujarat (2010-2011).

== Vanche Gujarat ==
Vanche Gujarat (Read Gujarat) was a campaign to inculcate reading habits and imbibe reading culture in people and more particularly amongst children. Shri Narendra Modi famously called this campaign his favorite campaign amongst all the projects launched during the Golden Jubilee Celebration Year of Gujarat (2010-2011).

Desai is known for his work as the Honorary Secretary of the campaign.

== Sayaji Vaibhav Public Library Navsari ==
Desai is involved with the Sayaji Vaibhav Public Library Navsari for past 20 years carrying out creative and innovative programs inspiring children to read books and to inculcate reading habits.

== Jyotirdhar Abhiyaan (Teachers Training Program) ==
The Campaign For Awareness And Fulfillment Of Teacher's Swadharma has been initiated by the Sayaji Vaibhav Public Library Navsari and Oasis, Vadodara. The campaign has already commenced from 29 July 2012 from Navsari. The project is aimed at training 10,000 teachers across the state of Gujarat.

Desai is one of the co-founder of this project.

== 150 Years of Celebrating the Mahatma ==
Mahadev Desai serves as a member of the National Committee and the executive committee to commemorate the 150th Birth Anniversary of Mahatma Gandhi. The President of India, Ramnath Kovind, is the chairman of the National Committee, and Prime Minister of India Narendra Modi is the chairman of the executive committee. The Ministry of Culture, Government of India, has launched a website providing details about the commemoration activities and events.

In 2016–17, Desai served on the National Committee commemorating the Birth Centenary of Pandit Deen Dayal Upadhyaya.
