= Gajanan Bhaskar Vaidya =

Indian missionary and writer (1867– 1921)

Gajanan Bhaskar Vaidya (1867 – 1921) was a modern Hindu missionary, teacher, writer, and orator. He was the founder of the Hindu Missionary Society in Bombay and served as the president of the Marathi Grantha Sangrahalaya.

== Life and career ==
Vaidya completed his Bachelor of Arts (B.A.) in Bombay in 1893. Beginning in 1898, he engaged in the propagation of Theosophy. From 1899 to 1920, he served as the president of the Marathi Grantha Sangrahalaya in Bombay.

Between 1904 and 1921, Vaidya worked as an educator at the school run by the Students' Literary and Scientific Society, which had been established by Dadabhai Naoroji. He was recognized as an eloquent orator, skilled debater, and an insightful writer and speaker.

== Religious work ==
Vaidya was a strong advocate for the re-conversion of converted Hindus back into Hinduism. In July 1917, he established the Hindu Missionary Society and initiated a weekly publication named Hindu Missionary. Through religious purification, he brought 100 men and women who had converted to or were born into other religions back into the Hindu faith.

== Selected works ==
Vaidya authored numerous books, including:

- Rekhatmak Yathartha Darshan
- Chitravidya
- Prashnopanishad
- Dehadanamimansa
- Vishnuche Avatar
- Hitopadeshkatha
- Vikramorvashiyam
- Sanatan Dharmavichar
- Sanatan Dharmasamvad
- Ashram ani Ashramdharma
- Upanayanvidhi
- Vaidik Vivahavidhi
