= K. B. Desai =

Indian independence activist and doctor

- Born: Khandubhai Bhimbhai Desai; 3 September 1897; Sarbhan, Bombay Presidency, British India (now Gujarat, India)
- Died: 5 November 1979 (aged 82); Navsari, Gujarat, India
- Occupation: Medical doctor
- Title: President of Navsari Municipal Council
- Political party: Congress
- Spouse: Lilavati Desai

K. B. Desai (3 September 1897 – 5 November 1979) was an Indian medical doctor, a local leader of Congress from Navsari during the Indian independence movement, and a social reformer. He was a Gandhian.

== Freedom struggle ==
Vallabhbhai Patel was imprisoned in the wake of the Salt March in 1930. Desai acted as a spokesperson for Mahatma Gandhi in Navsari, organizing the local police as a strategy to help release Patel. He was imprisoned on multiple occasions for his role in the freedom struggle.

== President of Navsari Municipal Council ==
After independence in 1947, he served as President of Navsari Municipal Council (Nagarpalika Pramukh).

== Medical career ==
Desai graduated with an M.B.B.S. from Bombay (Mumbai) in 1922. He obtained further medical training from Dublin and Vienna. Desai provided surgical, obstetric, dental and non-surgical care. He built and ran K. B. Desai Hospital in Navsari.

== Social reform ==
Desai was actively involved in social reform movements. He opposed the caste system, admitting patients of all castes to his hospital and serving them food from a single kitchen using one set of utensils.
