= Khurshedben Naoroji =

Female leader in the Indian independence movement

- Born: 1894
- Died: 1966 (aged 71–72)
- Movement: Indian independence movement
- Relatives: Dadabhai Naoroji (grandfather); Meher Naoroji and Perin Captain (sisters)

Khurshedben Naoroji (1894–1966) was an accomplished soprano and an early part of the Indian Independence Movement. She was the grand daughter of India's first nationalist leader and the first Indian to serve in the British Parliament Dadabhai Naoroji.

== Early life ==
She was born in Bombay (now Mumbai) and became an accomplished classical soprano. Family and friends dubbed her "bul" or nightingale. In the early 1920s, she relocated to Paris to study music, but found herself culturally adrift in Europe until she crossed paths with another expatriate woman, Eva Palmer Sikelianos.

Sikelianos, a New York aristocrat, had relocated to Athens where she became one of the principal architects of a revival of classical Greek culture. Their conversations about Greek and Indian musical traditions resulted in the setting up of a school of non-Western music in Athens. Khurshedben left classical music behind in Paris and flourished in Greece, donning Indian saris and holding impromptu Indian music concerts. Khurshedben spoke wistfully about India and about joining Mahatma Gandhi's movement for freedom from the British colonial rule. When Sikelianos solicited her help for the first Delphic Festival, Khurshedben turned down the offer, instead returning to Bombay.

== Role in India's Independence movement ==
Soon, she moved to Gandhi's Sabarmati ashram in Gujarat where she encouraged Gandhi to widen women's involvement in nationalist activities. Gandhian activism, she told a newspaper, allowed for "the great awakening of women" - and women were "not going to stop their work so well begun".

Khurshedben, focussed her work on the North-West Frontier Province (NWFP - now in Pakistan and called Khyber Pakhtunkhwa). By the early 1930s, this Parsi woman became a well-known figure in NWFP politics. She befriended Khan Abdul Ghaffar Khan, the "Frontier Gandhi" who led a nonviolent pro-nationalist movement amongst Pashtuns. Khurshedben was imprisoned by the British several times, once writing to Gandhi from a prison in Peshawar that "the fleas and I kept each other warm". In 1930, Khurshedben was arrested along with other revolutionaries for attempting to hoist the Indian flag in a Government College in Ahmedabad.

Gandhi had encouraged her to promote Hindu-Muslim unity and grow support for the Indian National Congress. This was impossible, however, while local Hindus remained terrorised by Muslim dacoits - bandits who conducted kidnapping raids from nearby Waziristan. These bandits, who terrified British and Indian policemen, stoked communal tensions. For Khurshedben, the answer to this dilemma was obvious - she would approach the dacoits, encourage them to desist from banditry and embrace Gandhian nonviolence.

In late 1940 she began long tours on foot, meeting and conversing with locals. She counselled women about the evils of banditry, turning the mothers or daughters of dacoits against the practice. Remarkably, her approach yielded results. By December 1940, kidnappings had plummeted, improving communal harmony. Even local British authorities, her former incarcerators, now praised her.

=== Arrest at the border with Waziristan ===
A group of kidnapped Hindus were being held in Waziristan. Khurshedben decided to go even though she was conscious of the risk to her life: and if she was captured alive, she told Gandhi that dacoits would ask him for a ransom or "chop off a finger or a(n) ear".

She was unable to reach the kidnappers. British authorities arrested and jailed her before she crossed the Waziristan border. She cycled through prisons until 1944.

Following Indian independence, she worked for various government commissions and even resumed her singing career before dying, most likely in 1966.
