= Prakash K. Desai =

Indian Air Force Air Marshal

Air Marshal P. K. Desai PVSM AVSM VSM
- Born: Prakashchandra Khandubhai Desai; November 12, 1944 (age 81); Navsari, Gujarat, India
- Allegiance: India
- Branch: Indian Air Force
- Rank: Air Marshal
- Service number: 10078 AE(M)
- Commands: AFS Chakeri
- Awards: Param Vishisht Seva Medal; Ati Vishisht Seva Medal; Vishisht Seva Medal
- Education: Defence Services Staff College
- Spouse: Neena Desai

Air Marshal P. K. Desai PVSM AVSM VSM (born November 12, 1944) is a retired officer of the Indian Air Force (IAF). He served in the IAF from 1966 to 2004. Desai was Air Officer Commanding of Air Force Station Chakeri in Kanpur, and additionally served as Senior Maintenance Staff Officer of Maintenance Command in Nagpur and as Assistant Chief of Air Staff Engineering at Air Headquarters in New Delhi.

== Scientific contribution ==
Desai worked on research and development aspects of indigenisation of the IAF. He was chair of Aeronautical Society of India (Uttar Pradesh and Bihar). He also served on scientific committees at CSIR-National Aerospace Laboratories (CSIR-NAL) and Indian Society of Non-Destructive Testing (ISNDT).

== Works ==
• Ripudaman Singh and P. K. Desai. Metallic Birds: The Life Beyond. India Defense Review. Vol 12 (1). Editor: Major General Afsir Karim AVSM (retd.). ISBN 81-7062-275-1.

• P. K. Desai and C. Mohanty. Pragmatic Approach to Indigenisation: Case Studies of Airborne Items. Aerospace Manufacturing Technology. Editors: N. K. Naik, Kanchan Biswas, G. C. Popli.

• P. K. Desai. Life Extension of Aircraft Components, An IAF Perspective.

== Diplomatic service ==
Desai served as Deputy Air Attache at Indian Embassy in Moscow. Later, he was part of several Indian delegations to Russia and Ukraine, and completed defense contracts successfully. He was a member of Indian delegation to Russia led by the then Defense Minister George Fernandes in 2002.

== Honours and decorations ==
The Government of India conferred on Desai Param Vishisht Seva Medal (PVSM), Ati Vishisht Seva Medal (AVSM) and Vishisht Seva Medal (VSM).

Param Vishisht Seva Medal	Ati Vishisht Seva Medal	Vishisht Seva Medal

== Post-retirement ==
Desai is the President of Air Force Association of Gujarat headquartered in Ahmedabad since retirement from the IAF. The association looks after the welfare of retired Air Force personnel and is also involved in community service.

Desai has helped establish Navin Desai Residential School near Nagpur in Maharashtra in memory of his brother. The school provides free education to children of migrant quarry workers.
