= Meherji Rana =

Dastur Meherji Rana
- Born: 1514; Navsari, Delhi Sultanate
- Died: 1591 (aged 76–77); Mughal Empire
- Occupation: Spiritual leader

The first Dastur Meherji Rana, sometimes known as Mayyaji Rana, was a spiritual leader of the Parsi community in India during the sixteenth century. He was seen by the Parsi community as someone with “vast knowledge and spiritual powers”.

== Early life ==
Dastur Meherji was born to Rana Jesung into a priestly family at Navsari, in 1514. During that time, India was under the rule of the Lodis. According to one school of thought, Dastur Meherji was a disciple of the mystic saint, Dastur Azar Kayvan, who lived in Patna. Dastur Azar Kayvan's disciples were called 'yaar' (i.e. spiritual friends / spiritual helpers). Thus, Dastur Meherji is sometimes referred as Dastur Mahiyaar as well ('Mahi' referring to a fish that has exceptional vision in the dark).

Dastur Meherji was later adopted by his paternal Uncle Vaccha Jesung. It is for this reason his name is invoked in Parsi ceremonies as "Dastur Meherji, Ervad Vaccha".

== Influence on the Parsis ==
Purportedly, Dastur Meherji is also said to have an influence on Akbar. It is believed that Akbar first met him in 1573 when the former laid siege on Surat. They appear to have met at a place near Kankrakhadi (present day Rustompura in Surat). Impressed with Dastur Meherji's knowledge and personality, the Emperor personally invited him to his court in Delhi. Accordingly, Dastur Meherji visited the Royal Court of Akbar in Delhi of Roj Hormazd, Mah Khordod during 947 Y.Z. (1578 AD). Akbar's Prime Minister Abu Fazal and historian Badaoqi have also written about Parsi Priests from Navsari visiting the Royal Court around 1577-1578.

Pleased as the Emperor was with Dastur Meherji's erudition and piety, he gave 200 bighas of land near 'Gelkhari' in Gujarat, (free of all taxes) for Meherji Rana and his family's sustenance. It was called "Madad-e-Maash".

Dastur Meherji Rana's prominence and close affinity to the Emperor also gave the Parsis national visibility and fame as a community. In 1579, the priests of Navsari signed a document acknowledging Meherji Rana as their leader and declaring that all religious ceremonies would henceforth be performed only after obtaining his permission. This was the origin of the "gaadi" (seat) of the High Priest of Navsari. The present High Priest, Kai Khooshroo Navroze Meherji Rana, is the seventeenth heir to this famous 'gaadi'.

Legend has it that during Dastur Meherji's stay in Delhi, a Tantrik claimed that, thanks to his occult powers, he was able to make two suns shine in the sky. He challenged all holy men in Akbar's kingdom to respond to this 'miracle'. It was said that once, the magician, with the aid of certain spells, had launched a metal plate in the sky to reflect the sun and make it appear as If there were two suns in the sky. Nobody was aware of this trick and many attempts by holy men to thwart the magician failed. However, Dastur Meherji Rana arrived, sincerely chanted the sacred Kusti prayers, and called upon the name of God. The plate then came crashing down, confounding the magician and astonishing the whole court. There is no historical reference to this encounter but this has been part of oral tradition for more than four centuries.

The famous musician Tansen composed a song in 'Raag Sarang' which had the lines "Elahi Parsee Padhe Sho Kabool" (i.e. By God, the prayers of Parsees are accepted). Tansen here refers to Dastur Meherji with the words "Lambi lambi dahadee Shah Mehreyari tere mukh pi barshat noor" (i.e. Shah Mehriyar, your beard is long and your face is radiant with fame).

== Death ==
Dastur Meherji died at a ripe old age at Roj Daepadar Mah Asfandarmad in 960 Y.Z. (1591 AD). Today, even after four centuries of his death, the priests in Navsari perform his "baj" ceremony every year on Roj Daepadar, Mah Asfandarmad. At the Atashbehram in Navsari, there is also a natural formation in the marble slab on the wall facing the Holy Fire, which is said to largely resemble Dastur Meherji. The turban, long beard and uplifted hands which quite clear in the image is the reasoning behind its resemblance to Dastur Meherji. Nevertheless, sceptics dismiss this natural formation as a flight of imagination while the mystics believe that this is nature's imprint of a Zarathushtrian saint who influenced many lives. Seemingly four years after Dastur Meherji's death, Akbar granted an additional 300 vighas of land to his son, Kakiobad.

== Legacy ==
The First Dastoor Meherji Rana Library in Navsari, Gujarat was founded in 1872 and named after him.
