= Hiralal Jairam =

South African cricketer (1933–2018)

Personal information
- Born: 12 November 1933; Navsari, Gujarat, India
- Died: 25 June 2018 (aged 84); Lenasia, South Africa
- Source: ESPNcricinfo, 26 April 2021

Hiralal Jairam (12 November 1933 – 25 June 2018) was a South African cricketer. He played in eight first-class matches for Transvaal from 1971/72 to 1973/74. Originally from India, Jairam moved to Johannesburg in 1942. However, due to the Group Areas Act, his family was forced to move, before settling in Lenasia.
