= Perin Captain =

- Born: 12 October 1888; Mandvi, Kutch District, Gujarat, India
- Died: 1958 (aged 69–70)
- Spouse: Dhunjisha S. Captain
- Parent(s): Ardeshir; Virbai Dadina
- Relatives: Dadabhai Naoroji (grandfather); Meher Naoroji and Khurshedben Naoroji (sisters)
- Awards: Padma Shri (1954)

Perin Ben Captain (1888–1958) was an Indian freedom activist, social worker, and the grand daughter of renowned Indian intellectual and leader, Dadabhai Naoroji. The Government of India honoured her in 1954 with the award of Padma Shri, the fourth highest Indian civilian award for her contributions to the country, placing her among the first group of recipients of the award.

== Biography ==
Perin Ben was born on 12 October 1888 in Mandvi, in Kutch district, in the Indian state of Gujarat, in a Parsi family. Her father, Ardeshir, was a medical doctor and the eldest son of Dadabhai Naoroji, and her mother, Virbai Dadina, was a house wife. She lost her father in 1893 when she was only 5 years old and did her early education in Mumbai. Later, she joined University of Paris III: Sorbonne Nouvelle, from where she secured a degree in French. While in Paris, she came into the circle of Bhikaiji Cama and started participating in their activities. It is reported that she was involved with the plan to release Vinayak Damodar Savarkar after his arrest in London. During this time, she attended the Egyptian National Congress at Brussels in 1910 along with Savarkar and Bhikaiji Cama. She was also involved with the Polish émigré organisations based in Paris, which were revolting against the Czarist rule in Russia. After returning to India in 1911, Perin had an opportunity to meet Mahatma Gandhi and was influenced by his ideals. By 1919, she started working with him, and in 1920, she took to Swadeshi movement and started wearing Khadi. In 1921, she assisted in establishing the Rashtriya Stree Sabha, a women's movement based on gandhian ideals.

Perin married Dhunjisha S. Captain, a lawyer, in 1925, but the couple had no children. She continued her social activism after marriage and served on a number of councils of the Indian National Congress. She was the first woman president of Bombay Provincial Congress Committee, when she got elected to the post in 1930. She participated in the Civil disobedience movement initiated by Mahatma Gandhi and was incarcerated, the first of the several imprisonments she endured during the Indian freedom movement. When Gandhi Seva Sena was reconstituted in the 1930s, she was made its honorary General Secretary, a post she held till her death in 1958.

When the Government of India introduced the Padma civilian award system in 1954, Perin Captain was included in the first list of awardees for Padma Shri.
