= London Indian Society =

The London India Society was an Indian organisation founded in London in March 1865 under the leadership of Dadabhai Naoroji and W. C. Bonnerjee. The purpose of the organisation was to promote awareness of the rising Indian social and political aspirations in England, and to raise the profile of India related matters amongst the British public. The London Indian Society was superseded by the East India Association, which was founded by Dadabhai Naoroji in 1866.
