= Frederick Thomas Penton =

Frederick Thomas Penton (1851 – 12 June 1929) was a British army officer and Conservative Party politician.

He was the eldest son of Colonel Henry Penton, developer of the Pentonville area of London and his wife, Eliza Maria nee Langley of Brittas Castle, County Tipperary. He was educated at Harrow School and Christ Church, Oxford. In 1873 he received a commission in the 4th Dragoon Guards and served in the Anglo-Egyptian War of 1882. He left the army with the rank of captain in 1884.

He married Caroline Helen Mary Stewart of County Donegal in 1883. The couple had two children. He was an extensive land owner in a number of English counties, and was a justice of the peace for Buckinghamshire and the County of London, and a Deputy Lieutenant of Middlesex.

In June 1886 he was unanimously selected by the Conservative Party to contest the seat of Finsbury Central. Penton won the seat, unseating the sitting Liberal Party Member of Parliament, Howard Spensley, by the narrow margin of 5 votes. At the next general election in 1892 he was defeated by Dadabhai Naoroji, who won the seat by 3 votes following a recount. In April 1893 he indicated that he would not stand for parliament again. He was High Sheriff of Buckinghamshire for the year 1896.

He died at his home in South Kensington in June 1929, and was buried at St Peter's Church, Old Steine, Brighton.

Parliament of the United Kingdom
Preceded by Howard Spensley	Member of Parliament for Finsbury Central; 1886–1892	Succeeded by Dadabhai Naoroji
