= Finsbury Central (UK Parliament constituency) =

Parliamentary constituency in the United Kingdom, 1885–1918

- Former borough constituency for the House of Commons

1885–1918
- Seats: one
- Created from: Finsbury
- Replaced by: Finsbury

Finsbury Central was a parliamentary constituency that covered the Clerkenwell district of Central London. It returned one Member of Parliament (MP) to the House of Commons of the Parliament of the United Kingdom, elected by the first past the post system.

== History ==
The constituency was created when the two-member Finsbury constituency was divided by the Redistribution of Seats Act 1885 for the 1885 general election. It was abolished for the 1918 general election, when it was replaced by a new single-member Finsbury constituency.

== Boundaries ==
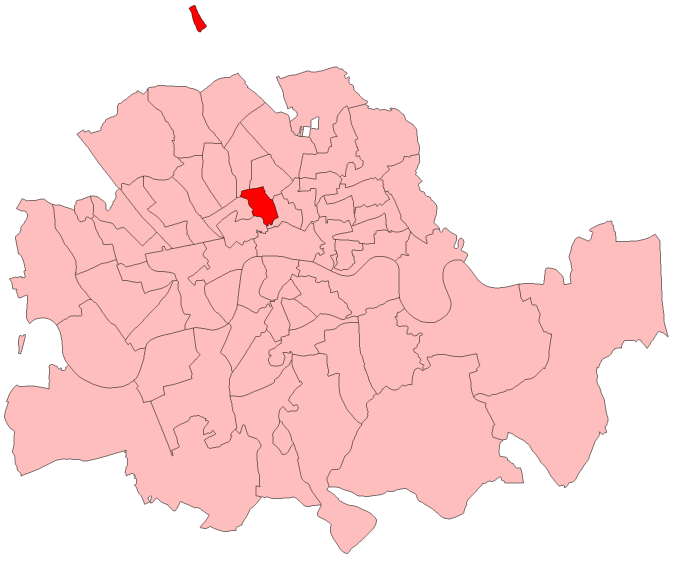
Finsbury Central in London 1885-1918

The constituency was created, in 1885, as a division of the parliamentary borough of Finsbury, in the historic county of Middlesex to the north of the City of London. The Redistribution of Seats Act 1885 provided that the constituency was to consist of the parish of St James and St John, Clerkenwell.

The seat was mostly located in the Clerkenwell district, with a detached portion at Muswell Hill containing about 5% of the population. The two areas were connected for historic reasons. The Social Geography of British Elections 1885-1910, explains that the Knights of St John had once owned more than half of Clerkenwell, including a deer park at Muswell Hill.

In 1889 Clerkenwell was severed from Middlesex to become part of the County of London.

In 1900 the lower tier of local government in London was rationalised. The old local boards and parish vestries were replaced, in the Clerkenwell area, by the Metropolitan Borough of Finsbury. The Muswell Hill area formed part of the Hornsey Urban District, which became the Municipal Borough of Hornsey in 1903.

The local government changes did not affect the parliamentary boundaries until the redistribution of 1918, when the Central division ceased to be a separate constituency.

== Members of Parliament ==
Year	Member	Party
1885	Howard Spensley	Liberal
1886	Frederick Penton	Conservative
1892	Dadabhai Naoroji	Liberal
1895	William Massey-Mainwaring	Conservative
1906	W. C. Steadman	Liberal
1910	Martin Archer-Shee	Conservative
1918	constituency abolished: see Finsbury	

== Election results ==
=== Elections in the 1880s ===
General election 1885: Finsbury Central
Party	Candidate	Votes	%	±%
Liberal	Howard Spensley	2,861	55.3	
Conservative	Saul Isaac	2,314	44.7	
Majority		547	10.6	
Turnout		5,175	69.4	
Registered electors		7,462		
Liberal win (new seat)				

General election 1886: Finsbury Central
Party	Candidate	Votes	%	±%
Conservative	Frederick Penton	2,245	50.1	+5.4
Liberal	Howard Spensley	2,240	49.9	−5.4
Majority		5	0.2	N/A
Turnout		4,485	60.1	−9.3
Registered electors		7,462		
Conservative gain from Liberal		Swing	+5.4	

=== Elections in the 1890s ===
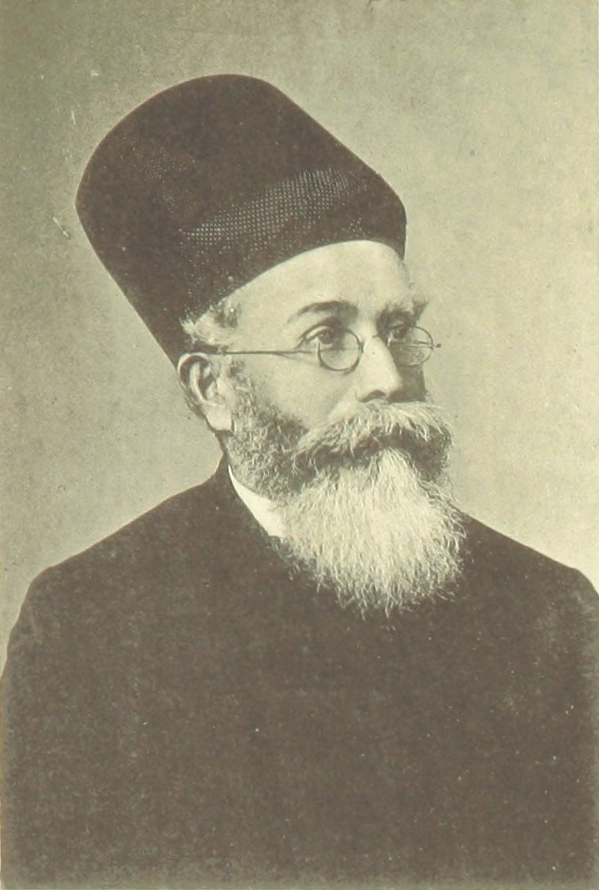
Naoroji

General election 1892: Finsbury Central
Party	Candidate	Votes	%	±%
Liberal	Dadabhai Naoroji	2,961	50.0	+0.1
Conservative	Frederick Penton	2,956	50.0	−0.1
Majority		5	0.0	N/A
Turnout		5,917	71.2	+11.1
Registered electors		8,311		
Liberal gain from Conservative		Swing	+0.1	

Massey-Mainwaring

General election 1895: Finsbury Central
Party	Candidate	Votes	%	±%
Conservative	William Massey-Mainwaring	3,588	56.3	+6.3
Liberal	Dadabhai Naoroji	2,783	43.7	−6.3
Majority		805	12.6	N/A
Turnout		6,371	71.5	+0.3
Registered electors		8,911		
Conservative gain from Liberal		Swing	+6.3	

=== Elections in the 1900s ===
Benson

General election 1900: Finsbury Central
Party	Candidate	Votes	%	±%
Conservative	William Massey-Mainwaring	2,872	53.2	−3.1
Liberal	Joseph Benson	2,523	46.8	+3.1
Majority		349	6.4	−6.2
Turnout		5,395	63.3	−8.2
Registered electors		8,523		
Conservative hold		Swing	−3.1	

Goulding

Steadman

General election 1906: Finsbury Central
Party	Candidate	Votes	%	±%
Lib-Lab	W. C. Steadman	3,493	55.5	+8.7
Conservative	Edward Goulding	2,799	44.5	−8.7
Majority		694	11.0	N/A
Turnout		6,292	76.0	+12.7
Registered electors		8,279		
Lib-Lab gain from Conservative		Swing	+8.7	

=== Elections in the 1910s ===
General election January 1910: Finsbury Central
Party	Candidate	Votes	%	±%
Conservative	Martin Archer-Shee	3,559	52.8	+8.3
Lib-Lab	W. C. Steadman	3,187	47.2	−8.3
Majority		372	5.6	N/A
Turnout		6,746	83.3	+7.3
Conservative gain from Lib-Lab		Swing	+8.3	

General election December 1910: Finsbury Central
Party	Candidate	Votes	%	±%
Conservative	Martin Archer-Shee	3,335	54.3	+1.5
Liberal	Felix Rosenheim	2,804	45.7	−1.5
Majority		531	8.6	+3.0
Turnout		6,139	75.8	−7.5
Conservative hold		Swing	+1.5	
