= Susila Bonnerjee =

Indian medical doctor and suffragist

Dr Susila Bonnerjee
- Died: 25 September 1920 (aged 48); Lahore, British India
- Education: Croyden High School; Newnham College, Cambridge; London School of Medicine for Women
- Occupations: Doctor, educator and suffragist
- Employer(s): Royal Free Hospital, Balfour Biological Laboratory for Women
- Organization(s): Indian Women's Education Association; Church League for Women's Suffrage
- Father: Womesh Chandra Bonnerjee

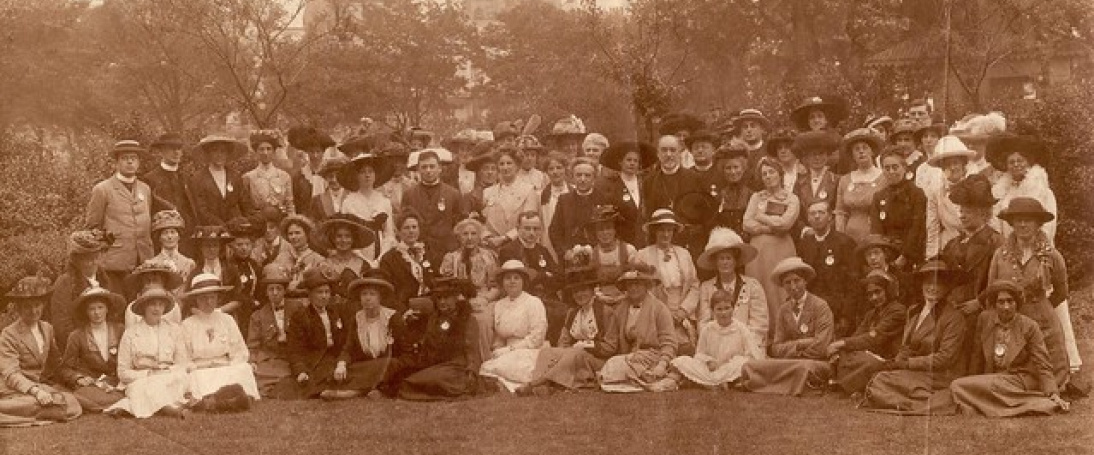
Seated third from left is Dr Susila Bonnerjee at a meeting of the Church League for Women's Suffrage in Brighton, 1913. Newnham College archives, Cambridge.

Susila Anita Bonnerjee (died 25 September 1920) was a medical doctor, educator and suffragist who advocated for women's education and health in England and India in the late 1800s.

== Life and education ==
Bonnerjee was born to Womesh Chandra Bonnerjee (a founder and the first president of the Indian National Congress) and Hemangini Motilal. She was one of six children (four sisters and two brothers), and was educated and lived primarily in Croydon, England, where her parents owned a home. They travelled frequently to their ancestral home in Kolkata as well. She died in Lahore, Pakistan (then part of British India), in 1920.

== Education and career ==
Bonnerjee was educated at the Croydon High School for Girls, and later attended Newnham College, Cambridge, where she studied the natural sciences. She went on to study medicine at the London School of Medicine for Women, and earned an M.B. degree in 1899. Bonnerjee was one of a small group of Indian women (including Rukhmabai, Alice Sorabji, and Merbai Vakil) who trained in medicine in England in the 1800s, later returning to India to help establish the medical profession for women and to open educational institutions for women's education.

Bonnerjee initially practiced medicine at the Royal Free Hospital. She later moved back to her familial home in Kolkata, India, and worked in Delhi, at Cambridge Mission Hospital. Her sister Janaki has recorded in her memoirs that Bonnerjee was the only available doctor at her mission station during a plague epidemic, and that the strain of treating patients in this time affected her own health. Facing objections from her family over her desire to establish her own practice, she returned to Cambridge in 1906, but was unable to establish an independent practice there either, frequently encountering incidents of racism and harassment that were recorded by her sister Janaki in a family history. Bonnerjee later joined the Balfour Laboratory at Newnham College, where she conducted research and taught physiology to students at Girton and Newnham Colleges.

In 1911, Bonnerjee was elected the president of a private organisation named the Indian Women's Education Association, and worked to raise funds to help educate Indian women in England. She was also active in the suffragist movement in England, and in 1913, she became a branch president of the Church League for Women's Suffrage in Ealing, England.

During World War I, she was given a temporary post as Home Surgeon in a hospital in Bristol.

Bonnerjee continued to travel between India and England to teach medicine and raise funds for women's education until her death in Lahore in 1920, when she was 48 years old.
