= Womesh Chunder Bonnerjee =

Indian politician (1844-1906)

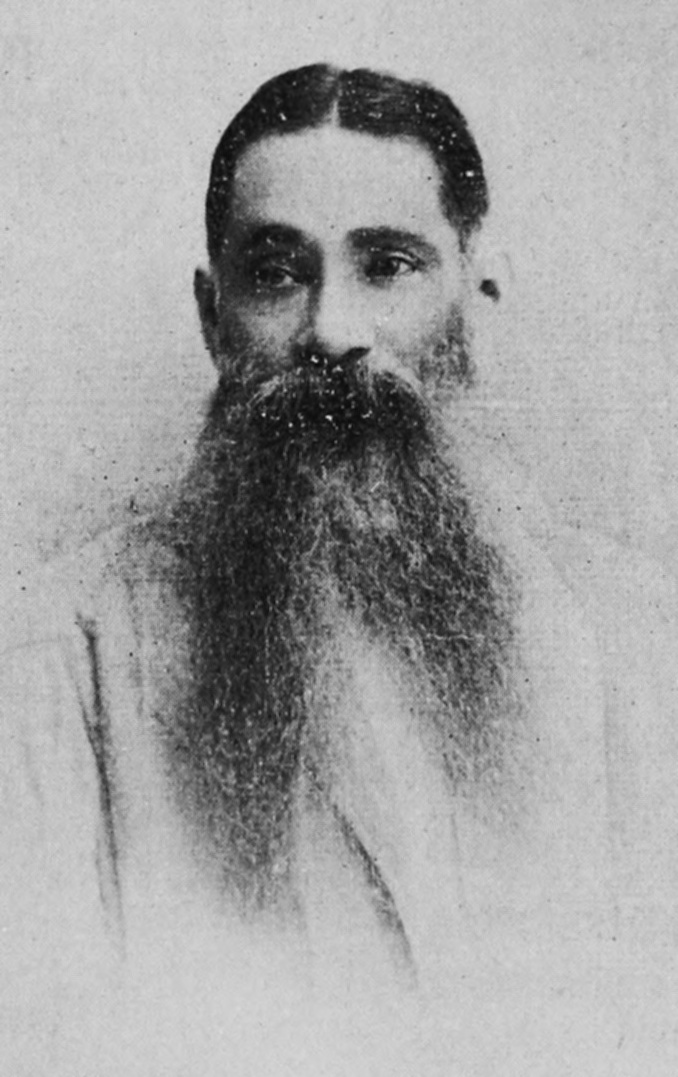

1st & 8th President of Indian National Congress
- In office 1885–1886
- Preceded by: post established
- Succeeded by: Dadabhai Naoroji
- In office 1892–1893
- Preceded by: Anandacharlu
- Succeeded by: Dadabhai Naoroji

Personal details
- Born: 29 December 1844 Calcutta, Bengal Presidency, British India
- Died: 21 July 1906 (aged 61) Croydon, London, England
- Party: Indian National Congress
- Spouse: Hemangini Motilal (m. 1859)
- Relations: Susila Bonnerjee (daughter)
- Education: Middle Temple
- Occupation: Indian independence activist Lawyer
- Known for: Co-founder and First president of Indian National Congress

Womesh Chunder Bonnerjee (or Umesh Chandra Banerjee; 29 December 1844 – 21 July 1906) was an Indian independence activist and barrister who practised in England. He was a secretary of the London Indian Society founded by Dadabhai Naoroji in 1865. He was one of the founders and the first president of Indian National Congress in 1885 at Bombay, serving again as president in 1892 at Allahabad. Bonnerjee financed the British Committee of Congress and its journals in London. Along with Naoroji, Eardley Norton and William Digby he started the Congress Political Agency, a branch of Congress in London. He unsuccessfully contested the 1892 United Kingdom general election as a Liberal party candidate for the Barrow and Furness seat. In 1893, Naoroji, Bonnerjee and Badruddin Tyabji founded the Indian Parliamentary Committee in England.

== Family ==
Bonnerjee was born on 29 December 1844 at Calcutta (now Kolkata), in the present-day state of West Bengal. He belonged to Rarhi Kulin Brahmin family who hailed from Baganda, located west of the town of Howrah in present-day state of West Bengal. His grandfather Pitambur Bonnerjee first migrated to Calcutta (now Kolkata) and settled there. From his mother's side, Womesh Chandra was descended from the renowned Sanskrit scholar and philosopher Pundit Juggonath Turkopunchanun of Tribeni, Hooghly District in present-day West Bengal.

== Early days ==
Bonnerjee studied at the Oriental Seminary and the Hindu School. In 1859, he married Hemangini Motilal. His career began in 1862 when he joined the firm of W. P. Gillanders, attorneys of the Calcutta Supreme Court, as a clerk. In this post he acquired a good knowledge of law which greatly helped him in his later career. In 1864 he was sent to England through a scholarship from Mr. R. J. Jijibhai of Bombay where he joined the Middle Temple and was called to the Bar in June 1867. On his return to Calcutta in 1868, he found a patron in Sir Charles Paul, Barrister-at-Law of the Calcutta High Court. Another barrister, J. P. Kennedy, also greatly helped him to establish his reputation as a lawyer. Within a few years he became the most sought after barrister in the High Court. He was the first Indian to act as a Standing Counsel, in which capacity he officiated four times — 1882, 1884, 1886-87. In 1883 he defended Surendranath Banerjee in the famous contempt of court case against him in the Calcutta High Court. He was the fellow of Calcutta University and was the president of its law faculty and often represented it in the legislative council. He retired from the Calcutta bar in 1901.

== As a president of Indian National Congress ==
He presided over the first session of the Indian National Congress held at Bombay in 1885 from 28 to 31 December and attended by 72 members. In the 1886 session held at Calcutta, under the presidency of Dadabhai Naoroji, he proposed the formation of standing committees of the Congress in each province for the better co-ordination of its work and it was on this occasion that he advocated that the Congress should confine its activities to political matters only, leaving the question of social reforms to other organisations. He was the president of the Indian National Congress again in the 1892 session in Allahabad where he denounced the position that India had to prove for worthiness of political freedom. He moved to Britain and practised before the Privy Council. He financed the British Committee of Congress and its journals in London. In 1865 Dadabhai Naoroji founded the London Indian society and Bonnerjee was made its general secretary. In December 1866, Naoroji dissolved the society and formed East Indian Association. When Bonnerjee became the Congress president Naoroji along with him, Eardley Norton and William Digby opened The Congress Political Agency, a branch of Congress in London. He lived in Croydon and named his residence after his birthplace Khidirpur. The Liberal party made him his candidate for the Barrow and Furness seat in 1892. Bonnerjee was defeated by Charles Cayzer, a Tory candidate. In the same elections Naoroji won the Finsbury Central constituency and defeated his nearest rival by a narrow margin of only 5 votes. Naoroji became the first Indian member of the British Parliament. In 1893, Naoriji, Bonnerjee and Badruddin Tyabji founded the Indian Parliamentary Committee in England.

== Personal life ==
A daughter, Janaki Agnes Penelope Majumdar, studied natural science, chemistry, zoology and physiology at Newnham College, Cambridge University while another daughter, Susila Anita Bonnerjee was a doctor, teacher, and suffragette. Among Bonnerjee's grandsons through his daughter Pramila Chaudhuri were General Jayanto Nath Chaudhuri, 5th Chief of the Army Staff of the Indian Army, and Kali Prasad Choudhuri, a pilot officer in the Royal Indian Air Force killed in action in 1941.

Bonnerjee died at his Croydon home 'Kidderpore', 8 Bedford Park, on 21 July 1906. His estate, assessed for probate on 17 August at £8,884 15s. 4d. (equivalent to £934,031 in 2025), was left to his widow, who subsequently returned to India, surviving him by four years.

Preceded by (none)	President of the Indian National Congress; 1885	Succeeded by Dadabhai Naoroji
Preceded by Anandacharlu	President of the Indian National Congress; 1892	Succeeded by Dadabhai Naoroji
