= William Massey-Mainwaring =

British politician

Massey-Mainwaring in 1895.

The Honourable William Frederick Barton Massey-Mainwaring (28 May 1845 – 12 March 1907) was an Irish art collector and Conservative Party politician in the United Kingdom.

The fifth son of Eyre Massey, 3rd Baron Clarina and his wife Susan Elizabeth (née Burton), he was originally known as William Frederick Barton Massey. Educated at Trinity College Dublin, he was called to the bar at the Inner Temple, London. In 1872 he married Isabella Anne Milman, a widow and only child of Benjamin Lee Mainwaring of Knaresborough. He assumed the surname Massey-Mainwaring on marriage.

Massey-Mainwaring was a well-known art collector who lent items from his collection to public galleries around the country.

He was involved in Conservative politics and in 1892 put his name forward as a candidate for the Hackney Central constituency. Eventually he stood aside in favour of Sir Andrew Scoble.

In 1895 he was elected as member of parliament for Finsbury Central, holding the seat until 1906. He died suddenly from influenza and diabetes at his London home in March 1907, aged 61.

Parliament of the United Kingdom
Preceded by Dadabhai Naoroji	Member of Parliament for Finsbury Central; 1895–1906	Succeeded by William Charles Steadman
