= Dadabhai Naoroji =

Indian politician, scholar and writer (1825–1917)

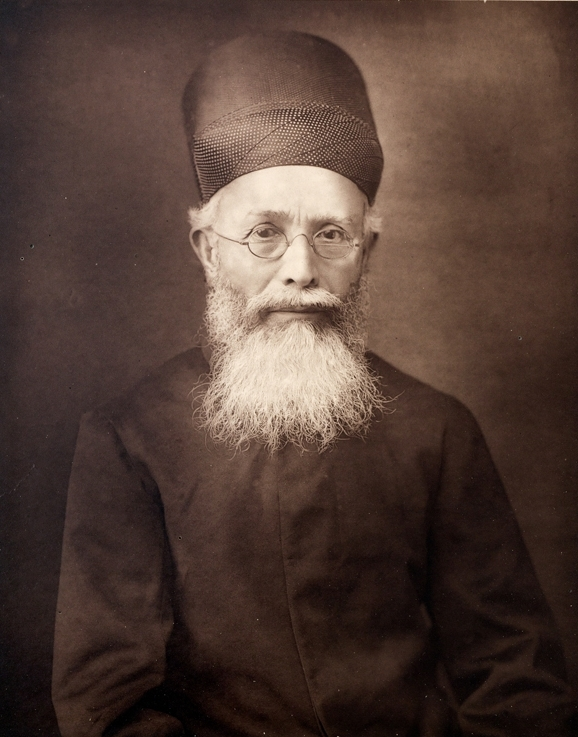
- Dadabhai Naoroji, c. 1889

Member of Parliament (UK) for Finsbury Central
- In office 1892–1895
- Preceded by: Frederick Thomas Penton
- Succeeded by: William Frederick Barton Massey-Mainwaring
- Majority: 5

2nd, 9th, and 22nd President of Indian National Congress
- In office 1886–1887
- Preceded by: Womesh Chunder Bonnerjee
- Succeeded by: Badruddin Tyabji
- In office 1893–1894
- Preceded by: Womesh Chunder Bonnerjee
- Succeeded by: Alfred Webb
- In office 1906–1907
- Preceded by: Gopal Krishna Gokhale
- Succeeded by: Rashbihari Ghosh

Personal details
- Born: Dadabhai Naoroji Dordi; 4 September 1825 Navsari, Bombay Presidency
- Died: 30 June 1917 (aged 91) Bombay, Bombay Presidency, British India
- Party: Co-founder of the Indian National Congress
- Other political affiliations: Liberal
- Spouse: Gulbaai
- Education: University of Bombay
- Occupation: Indian independence activist; Politician; Merchant; Scholar; Writer
- Known for: Co-founder and 2nd, 9th, 22nd President of Indian National Congress
- Nickname: Grand Old Man of India

Dadabhai Naoroji (4 September 1825 – 30 June 1917) was an Indian political leader, merchant, scholar, and writer who played a role in both Indian and British public life. He was among the founding members of the Indian National Congress and served as its President on three occasions, from 1886-87, 1893-94 and 1906-07. Naoroji's early career included serving as the Diwan of Baroda in 1874. Subsequently, he moved to England, where he continued to advocate for Indian interests. In 1892, he was elected to the House of Commons as a Liberal Party Member of Parliament, representing Finsbury Central until losing his seat to William Massey-Mainwaring at the 1895 general election. He was the second person of Asian descent to become a British MP following David Ochterlony Dyce Sombre, who was an Anglo Indian MP.

Naoroji is particularly known for formulating the "drain theory", which argued that economic exploitation under British rule led to the transfer of wealth from India to Britain. He detailed these views in his 1901 publication Poverty and Un-British Rule in India, which contributed to emerging debates on colonial economics and political representation. His work was influential among early nationalists and reformers, and he remained a key figure in shaping early Indian political thought. Naoroji also took part in international socialist networks and was a member of the Second International, alongside figures such as Karl Kautsky and Georgi Plekhanov. While Naoroji himself maintained a moderate stance, his engagement with transnational political groups reflected his broader concern with issues of labour, empire and global inequality.

In later years, Naoroji received posthumous recognition in both India and the United Kingdom. In 2014, the UK Government introduced the Dadabhai Naoroji Awards, launched by then-Deputy Prime Minister Nick Clegg, to honour contributions to UK-India relations. India Post commemorated him with postal stamps issued in 1963, 1997 and 2017. His legacy continues to be studied in the context of Indian nationalism, colonial critique and the early history of Asian participation in British politics.

== Biography ==
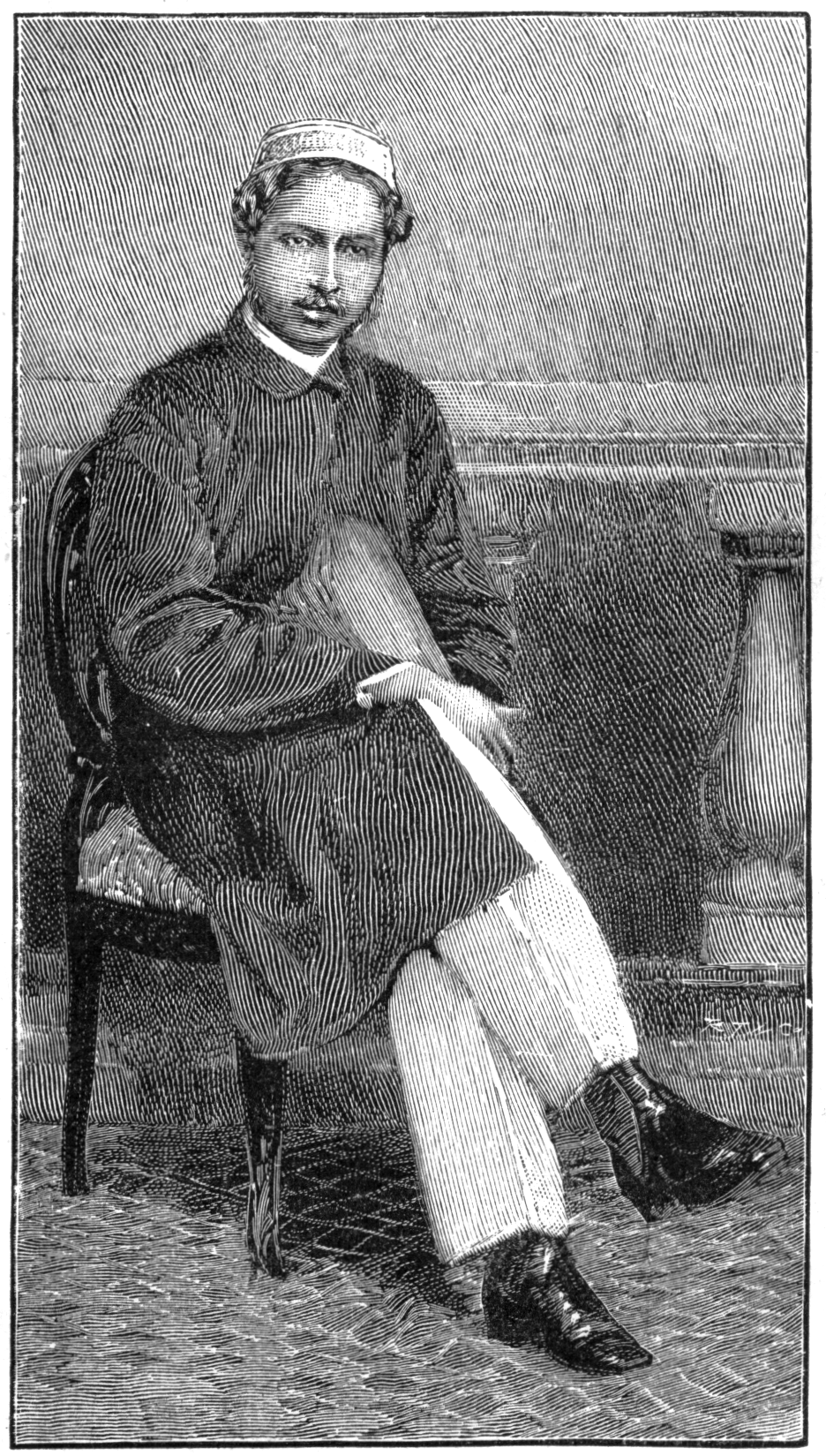
Naoroji at the age of 20

Naoroji was born in Navsari in a Gujarati-speaking Parsi Zoroastrian family, and educated at the Elphinstone Institute School. His patron was the Maharaja of Baroda, Sayajirao Gaekwad III, and he started his career as Dewan (Minister) to the Maharaja in 1874. Being an Athornan (ordained priest), Naoroji founded the Rahnumai Mazdayasan Sabha (Guides on the Mazdayasne Path) on 1 August 1851 to restore the Zoroastrian religion to its original purity and simplicity. In 1854, he also founded a Gujarati fortnightly publication, the Rast Goftar (The Truth Teller), to clarify Zoroastrian concepts and promote Parsi social reforms.

Around this time, he also published another newspaper called The Voice of India. In December 1855, he was appointed Professor of Mathematics and Natural Philosophy in Elphinstone College in Bombay, becoming the first Indian to hold such an academic position. He travelled to London in 1855 to become a partner in Cama & Co, opening a Liverpool location for the first Indian company to be established in Britain. Within three years, he had resigned on ethical grounds. In 1859, he established his own cotton trading company, Dadabhai Naoroji & Co. In 1861, he also founded the Zoroastrian Trust Funds of Europe alongside Muncherjee Hormusji Cama.

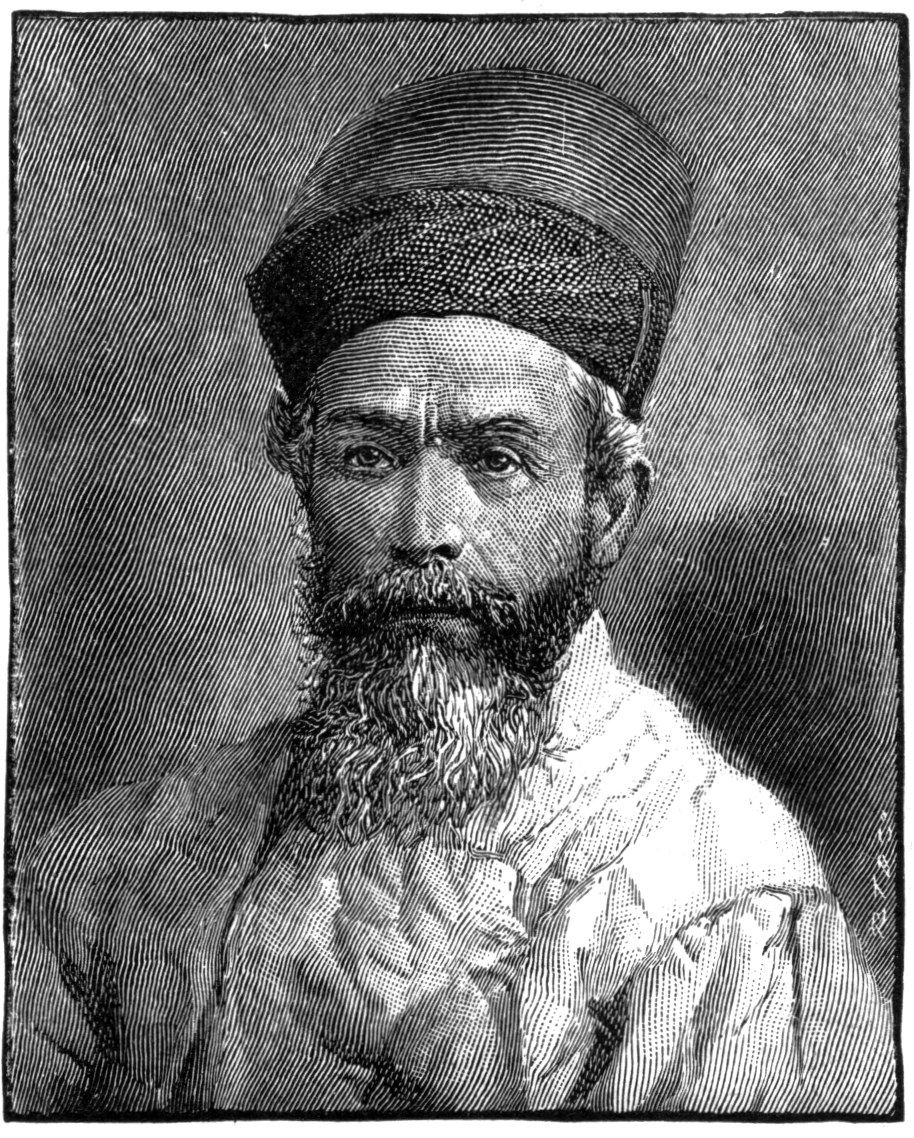
Dadabhai Naoroji at the age of 41

In 1865, Naoroji directed and launched the London Indian Society, the purpose of which was to discuss Indian political, social and literary subjects. In 1867, he also helped to establish the East India Association, one of the predecessor organisations of the Indian National Congress with the aim of putting across the Indian point of view before the British public. The Association was instrumental in counter-acting the propaganda by the Ethnological Society of London which, in its session in 1866, had tried to prove the inferiority of the Asians to the Europeans. This Association soon won the support of eminent Englishmen and was able to exercise considerable influence in the British parliament. The organisation soon had branches in Mumbai, Kolkata and Chennai.

In 1874, he became Prime Minister of Baroda and was a member of the Legislative Council of Bombay (1885–88). He was also a member of the Indian National Association founded by Sir Surendranath Banerjea from Calcutta a few years before the founding of the Indian National Congress in Bombay, with the same objectives and practices. The two groups later merged into the INC, and Naoroji was elected President of the Congress in 1886. Naoroji published Poverty and Un-British Rule in India in 1901.

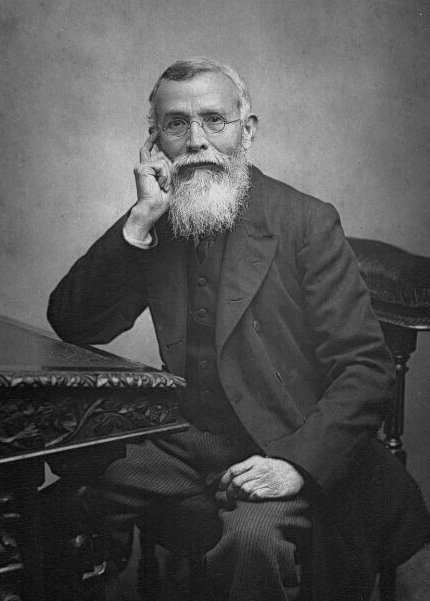
Naoroji in 1892

Naoroji moved to Britain once again and continued his political involvement. Elected for the Liberal Party in Finsbury Central at the 1892 general election, he was the first British Indian MP. He refused to take the oath on the Bible, as he was Zoroastrian. He was allowed to take the oath of office in the name of God on his copy of the Khordeh Avesta. During his time he put his efforts towards improving the situation in India. He had a very clear vision and was an effective communicator. He set forth his views about the situation in India over the course of the history of the governance of the country and the way in which the colonial rulers rule. In Parliament, he spoke on Irish Home Rule and the condition of the Indian people. He was a notable Freemason.

In 1906, Naoroji was again elected president of the Indian National Congress. He was a staunch moderate within the Congress, during the phase when opinion in the party was split between the moderates and extremists. Such was the respect commanded by him that assertive nationalists could not oppose his candidature and the rift was avoided for the time being. Naoroji's Poverty and Un-British Rule in India influenced Mahatma Gandhi.

=== Lord Salisbury's controversial remarks ===
Lord Salisbury, the then-Prime Minister, caused controversy in 1888 after Gainsford Bruce had won the Holborn by-election for the Unionists, beating the Liberal Lord Compton. Bruce had won the seat with a smaller majority than Francis Duncan had for the Unionists in 1885. Salisbury explained this by saying in a speech in Edinburgh on 30 November: "But then Colonel Duncan was opposed to a black man, and, however great the progress of mankind has been, and however far we have advanced in overcoming prejudices, I doubt if we have yet got to the point where a British constituency will elect a black man to represent them.... I am speaking roughly and using language in its colloquial sense, because I imagine the colour is not exactly black, but at all events, he was a man of another race."

The "black man" was, in fact, Dadabhai Naoroji. Salisbury's comments were criticised by the Queen and by Liberals who believed that Salisbury had suggested that only white Britons could represent a British constituency. Three weeks later, Salisbury delivered a speech at Scarborough, where he denied that "the word "black" necessarily implies any contemptuous denunciation: "Such a doctrine seems to be a scathing insult to a very large proportion of the human race... The people whom we have been fighting at Suakin, and whom we have happily conquered, are among the finest tribes in the world, and many of them are as black as my hat". Furthermore, "such candidatures are incongruous and unwise. The British House of Commons, with its traditions... is a machine too peculiar and too delicate to be managed by any but those who have been born within these isles". In 1888, the New York Times published an article that was extremely critical of Lord Salisbury's remark. It included the following quotation, "Of course the parsees are not black men, but the purest Aryan type in existence, with an average complexion fairer than Lord Salisbury's; but even if they were ebony hued it would be grotesque and foolish for a Prime Minister of England to insult them in such a wanton fashion as this." Naoroji was later elected for Finsbury in 1892 and Salisbury invited him to become a Governor of the Imperial Institute, which he accepted.

== Personal life and death ==
He was married to Gulbai at the age of 11. He died in Bombay on 30 June 1917, at the age of 91. The Dadabhai Naoroji Road, a heritage road of Mumbai, is named after him, as are the Dadabhai Naoroji Road in Karachi, Pakistan and Naoroji Street in the Finsbury area of London. A prominent residential colony for central government servants in the south of Delhi is also named Naoroji Nagar. His granddaughters, Perin and Khurshedben, were also involved in the independence movement. In 1930, Khurshedben was arrested along with other revolutionaries for attempting to hoist the Indian flag in a government college in Ahmedabad.

== Drain theory and poverty ==
Naoroji's work focused on the drain of wealth from India to Britain during the period of British rule in India. One of the reasons that the Drain theory is attributed to Naoroji is his decision to estimate the net national profit of India, and by extension, the effect that colonial rule had on the country. Through his work with economics, Naoroji sought to prove that Britain was draining money out of India.

Naoroji described six factors that resulted in the external drain:

1. India was governed by a foreign government.
2. India did not attract immigrants who brought labour and capital for economic growth.
3. India paid for Britain's civil administrations in India and her Indian army in the form of "Home Charges".
4. India bore the burden of empire building in and out of its borders.
5. Opening the country to free trade allowed for foreigners to take highly paid jobs over those of equally qualified Indians.
6. The principal income-earners would spend their money outside of India or leave with the money as they were mostly foreign personnel.

His book Poverty and Un-British Rule in India estimated a £200–300 million drain of India's revenue to Britain that was not recirculated into India.

When referring to the drain, Naoroji stated that he believed some tribute was necessary as payment for the services that Britain brought to India such as the newly constructed railways. However, the money from these services were being drained out of India; for instance the money being earned by the railways did not belong to India, which supported his assessment that India was sending too much to Britain. According to Naoroji, India was paying tribute for something that was not bringing profit to the country directly. Instead of paying off foreign investment, as other countries did, India was paying for services rendered despite the operation of the railway being already profitable for Britain. This type of drain was experienced in different ways as well, for instance, British workers earning wages that were not equal with the work that they have done in India, or trade that undervalued India's goods and overvalued outside goods.

British workers in India were encouraged to take on high paying jobs in India, and the British government allowed them to take a portion of their income back to Britain. Furthermore, the East India Company was purchasing Indian goods with money drained from India to export to Britain, which was a way that the opening up of free trade allowed India to be exploited.

When elected to Parliament by a narrow margin of five votes, his first speech was devoted to the issue of questioning Britain's role in India. Naoroji explained that Indians would either be British subjects or their slaves, depending on how willing Britain was to give India control over the institutions that Britain presently operated. By giving these institutions to India it would allow India to govern itself and as a result all revenue would stay in India.

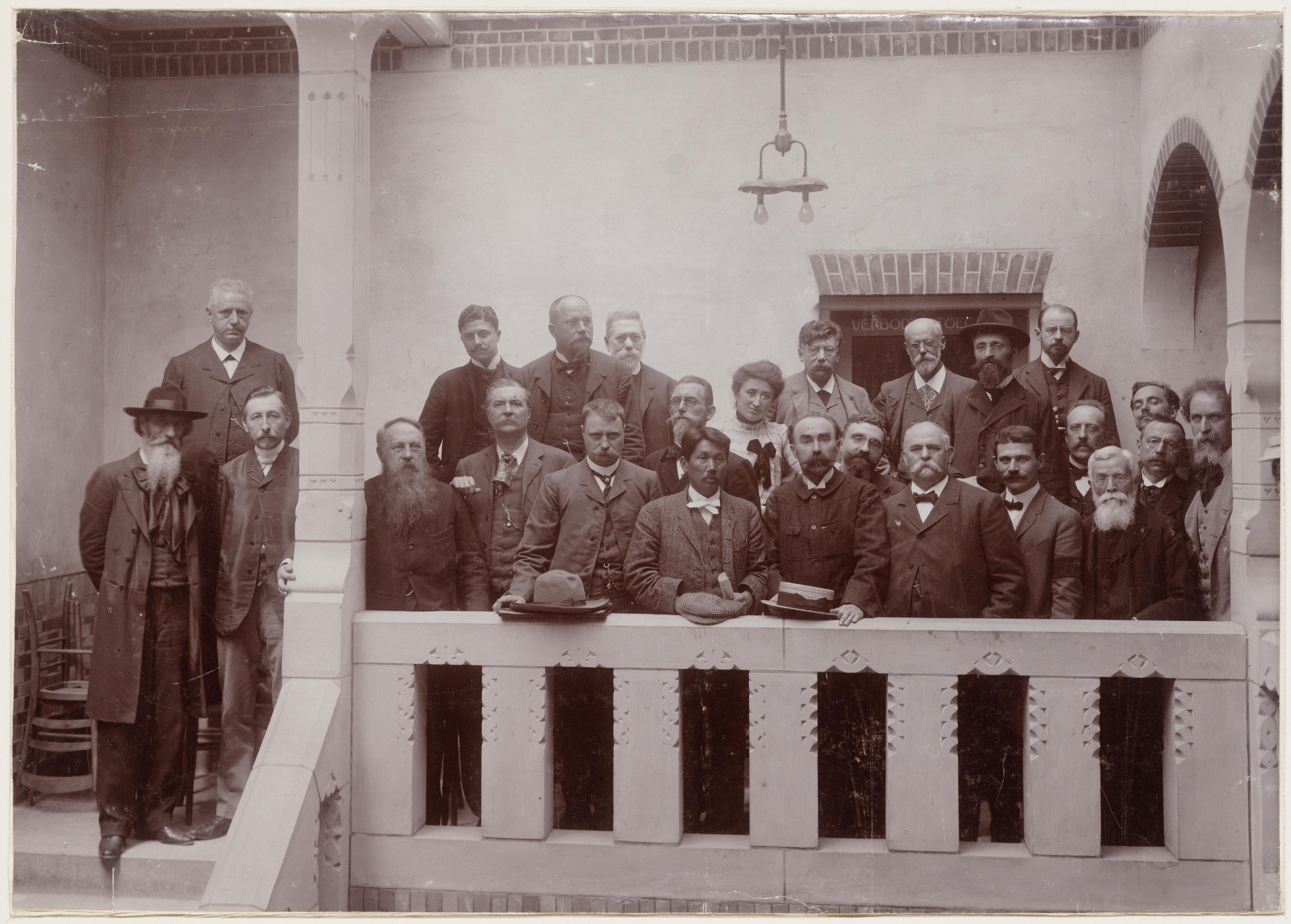
Naoroji (fourth from right) at the International Socialist Congress, Amsterdam 1904

Naoroji identified himself as a fellow subject of the Empire and was able to address the economic hardships facing India to a British audience. By presenting himself as an imperial subject he was able to use rhetoric to show the benefit to Britain that an ease of financial burden on India would have. He argued that by allowing the money earned in India to stay in India, tributes would be willingly and easily paid without fear of poverty; he argued that this could be done by giving equal employment opportunities to Indian professionals who were consistently forced to take jobs that they were over-qualified for. Indian labour would be more likely to spend their income within India preventing one aspect of the drain.

Naoroji also found it important to examine Anglo-Indian trade to prevent the premature dissolution of budding industries to unfair valuing of goods and services. By allowing industry to grow and develop in India, tribute could be paid to Britain in the form of taxation and the increase in Indian interest for British goods. Over time, Naoroji became more inflammatory in his comments as he began to lose patience with Britain over the seemingly lack of progress regarding reforms. He rhetorically questioned whether or not the British government would be willing to award French youths all the high ranking posts in the British economy. He also pointed to historical examples of Britain being opposed to the "wealth drain" concept, including the English objection to the wealth drain to the papacy during the 1500s.

Naoroji's work on the drain theory was the main reason behind the creation of the Royal Commission on Indian Expenditure in 1896 in which he was also a member. This commission reviewed financial burdens on India and in some cases came to the conclusion that those burdens were misplaced.

== Views and legacy ==
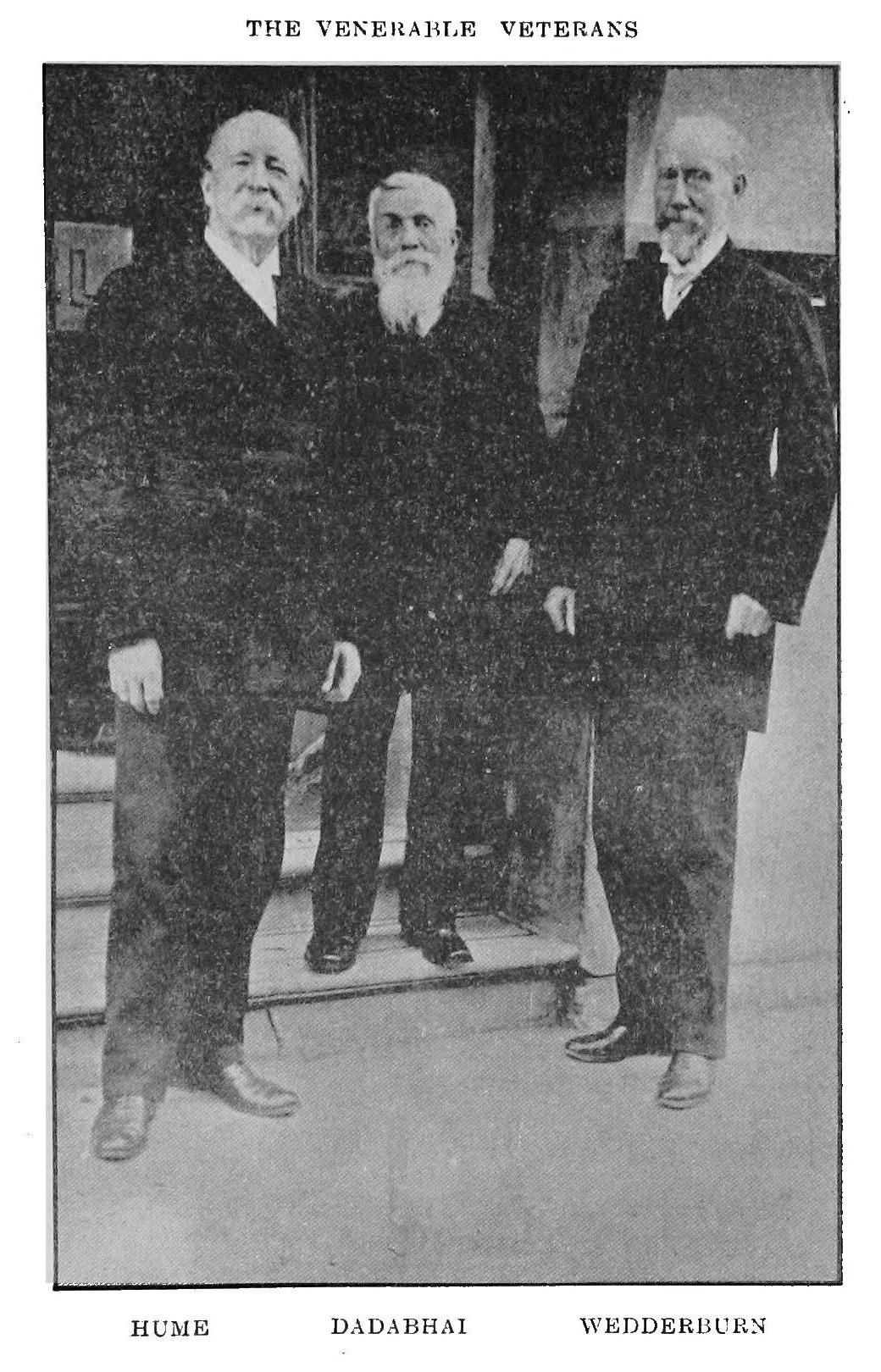
Left to right: Allan Octavian Hume, Naoroji, and William Wedderburn, all founders of the Indian National Congress

Dadabhai Naoroji is regarded as one of the most important Indians during the birth of the nascent independence movement. In his writings, he came to the conclusion that the exertion of foreign rule over India was not favourable for the nation, and that independence (or at the very least, responsible government) would be the better path for India.

Further development was checked by the frequent invasions of India by, and the subsequent continuous rule of, foreigners of entirely different character and genius, who, not having any sympathy with the indigenous literature—on the contrary, having much fanatical antipathy to the religion of the Hindus—prevented its further growth. Priest-hood, first for power and afterwards from ignorance, completed the mischief, as has happened in all other countries.

Naoroji is often remembered as the "Grand Old Man of Indian Nationalism".

Mahatma Gandhi wrote to Naoroji in 1894, saying: "The Indians look up to you as children to the father. Such is really the feeling here."

Bal Gangadhar Tilak admired him; he said:

If we twenty eight crore of Indians were entitled to send only one member to the British parliament, there is no doubt that we would have elected Dadabhai Naoroji unanimously to grace that post.

Here are the significant extracts taken from his speech delivered before the East India Association on 2 May 1867 regarding what educated Indians expect from their British rulers:

The difficulties thrown in the way of according to the natives such reasonable share and voice in the administration of the country as they are able to take, are creating some uneasiness and distrust. The universities are sending out hundreds and will soon begin to send out thousands of educated natives. This body naturally increases in influence...

"In this Memorandum I desire to submit for the kind and generous consideration of His Lordship the Secretary of State for India, that from the same cause of the deplorable drain [of economic wealth from India to Britain], besides the material exhaustion of India, the moral loss to her is no less sad and lamentable ... All [the Europeans] effectually do is to eat the substance of India, material and moral, while living there, and when they go, they carry away all they have acquired ... The thousands [of Indians] that are being sent out by the universities every year find themselves in a most anomalous position. There is no place for them in their motherland ... What must be the inevitable consequence? ... despotism and destruction ... or destroying hand and power."

A plaque referring to Dadabhai Naoroji is located outside the Finsbury Town Hall on Rosebery Avenue, London. On 10 August 2022, English Heritage unveiled a blue plaque in his honour at the site of his former home, 72, Anerley Park, Bromley, London, where he lived between 1897 and 1904 or 1905.

== Works ==
- Started the Rast Goftar Anglo-Gujarati Newspaper in 1854.
- The Parsee Religion . University of London. 1861 – via Wikisource.
- The Manners and Customs of the Parsees . Bombay. 1862 – via Wikisource.
- The European and Asiatic Races . London. 1866 – via Wikisource.
- Admission of educated natives into the Indian Civil Service (London, 1868)
- The wants and means of India (London, 1876)
- Condition of India (Madras, 1882)
- Poverty of India Bombay, Ranima Union Press (1876)

A Paper Read Before the Bombay Branch of the East India Association

- C. L. Parekh, ed., Essays, Speeches, Addresses and Writings of the Honourable Dadabhai Naoroji, Bombay, Caxton Printing Works (1887). An excerpt, "The Benefits of British Rule", in a modernised text by J. S. Arkenberg, ed., online at Paul Halsall, ed., Internet Modern History Sourcebook
- Lord Salisbury's Blackman (Lucknow, 1889)
- Naoroji, Dadabhai (1901). Poverty and Un-British Rule in India. Publications Division, Ministry of Information and Broadcasting, Government of India.; "Poverty and Un-British Rule in India" Commonwealth Publishers, 1988. ISBN 81-900066-2-2

== Commemorative postage stamps ==
Naoroji has been portrayed on commemorative stamps released by India Post (by year):

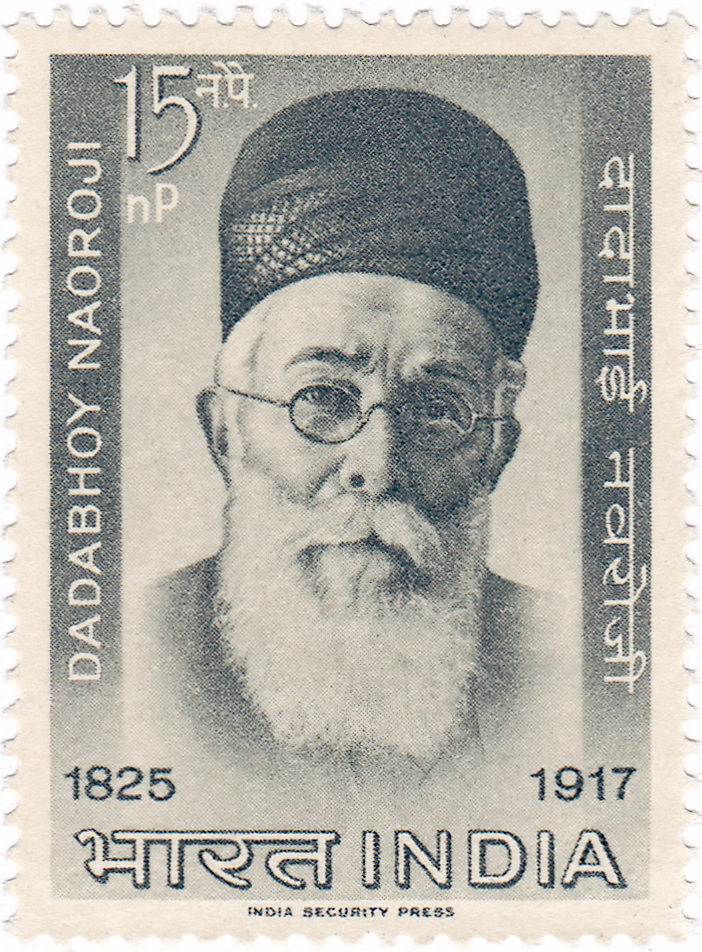
1963

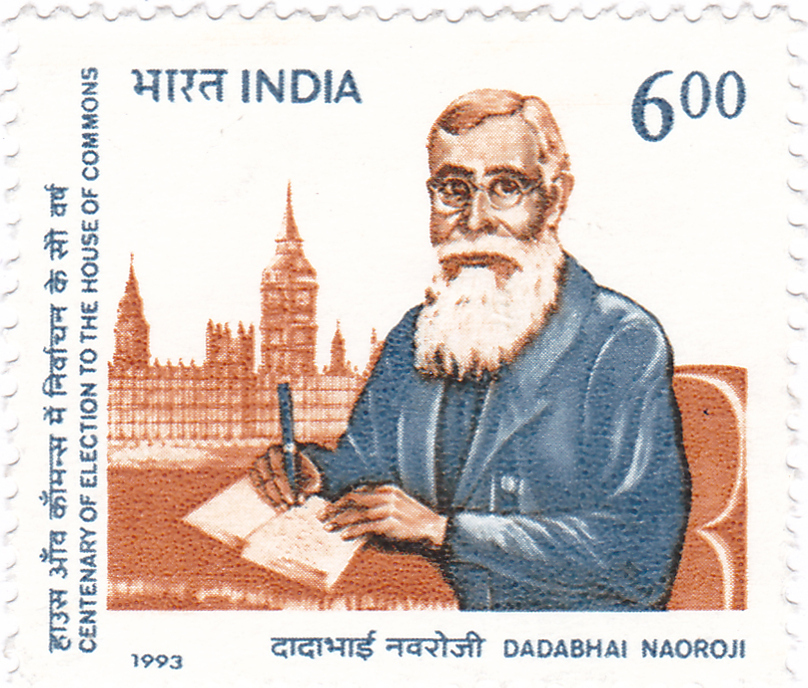
1993

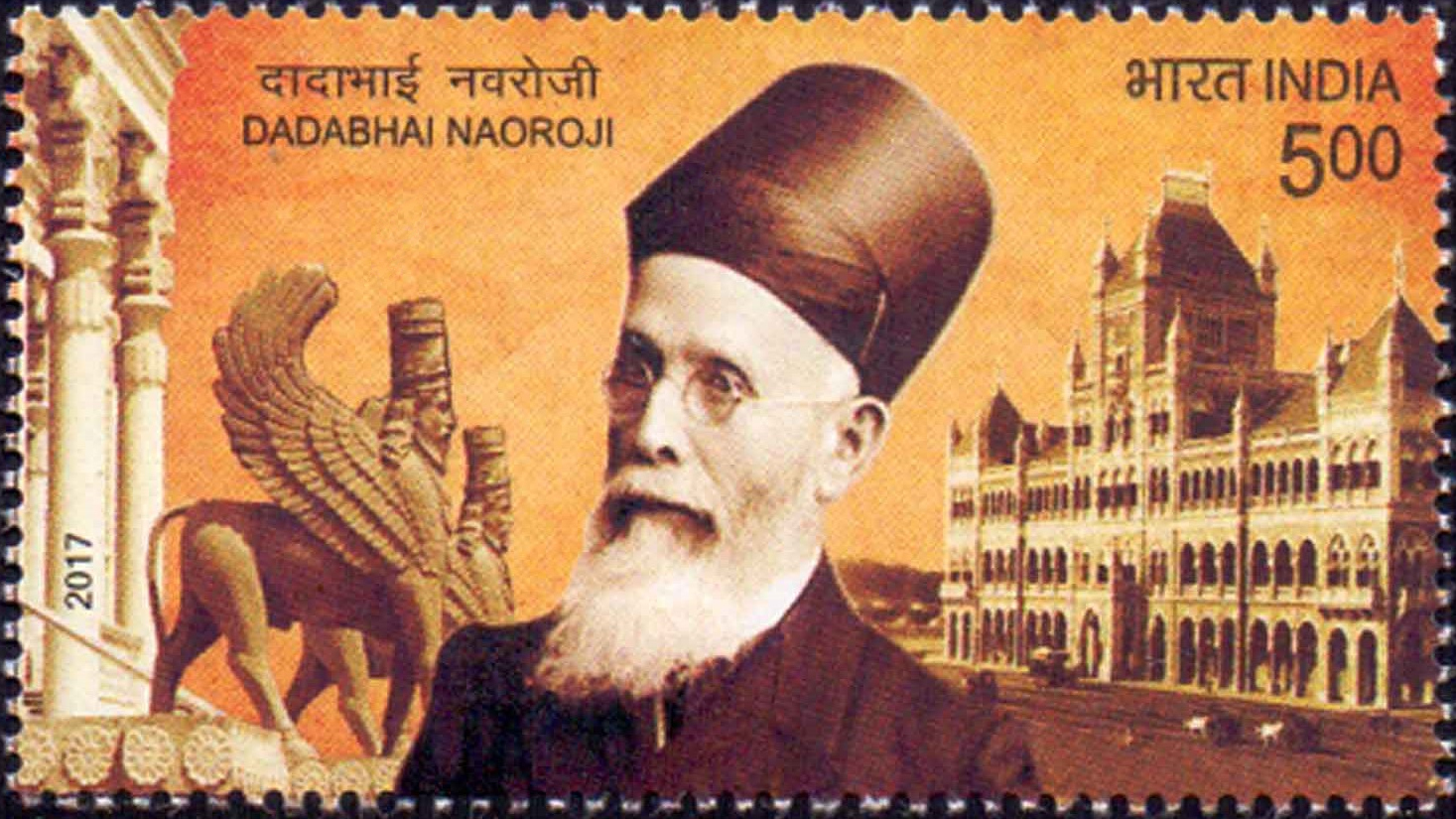
2017

== See also ==
- List of electoral firsts in the United Kingdom

Parliament of the United Kingdom
Preceded by Frederick Thomas Penton	MP for Finsbury Central; 1892–1895	Succeeded by William Frederick Barton; Massey-Mainwaring
Party political offices
Preceded by Womesh Chunder Bonnerjee	President of the Indian National Congress; 1886	Succeeded by Badruddin Tyabji
Preceded by Womesh Chunder Bonnerjee	President of the Indian National Congress; 1893	Succeeded by Alfred Webb
Preceded by Gopal Krishna Gokhale	President of the Indian National Congress; 1906	Succeeded by Rash Behari Ghosh
