= Navsari =

City in Gujarat, India

- City
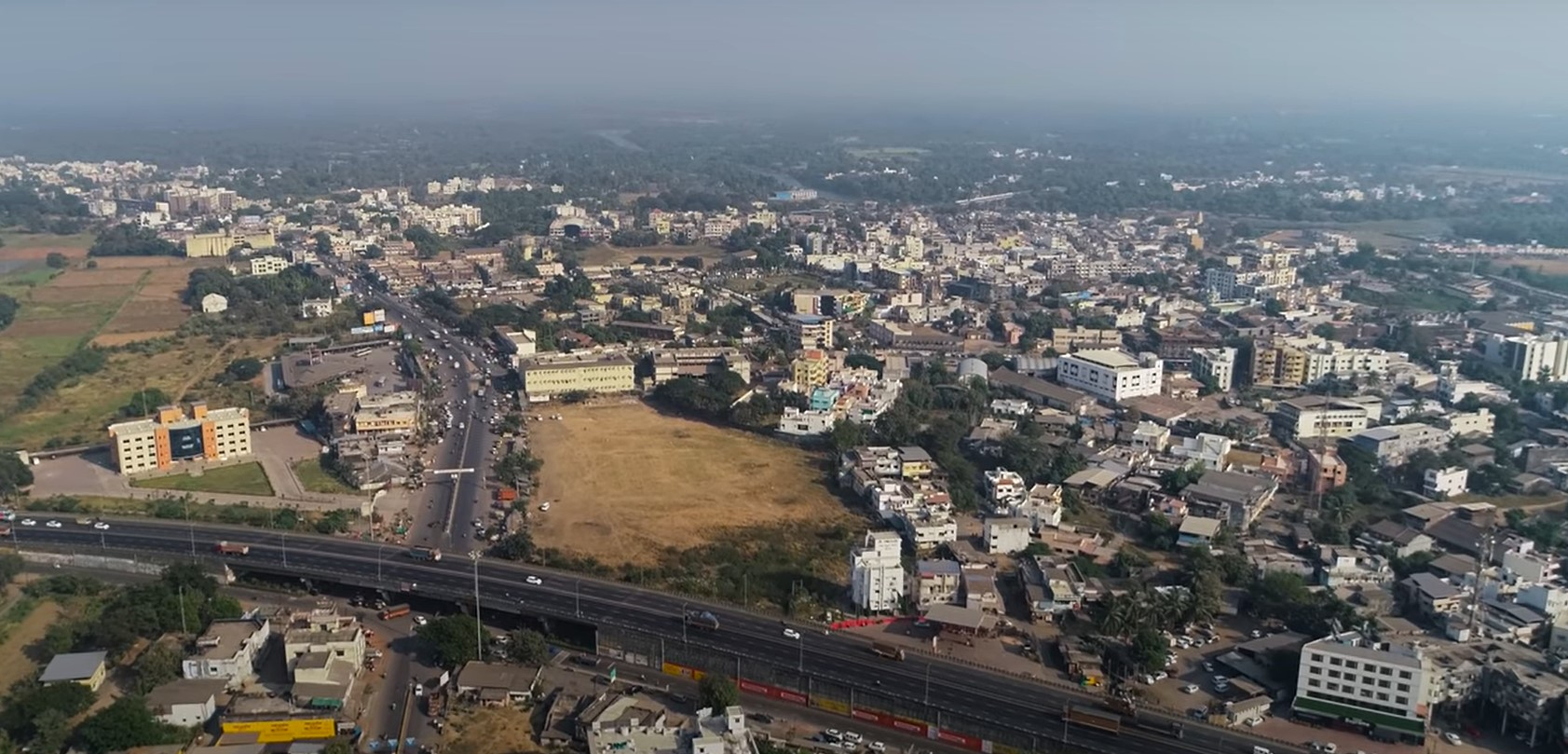
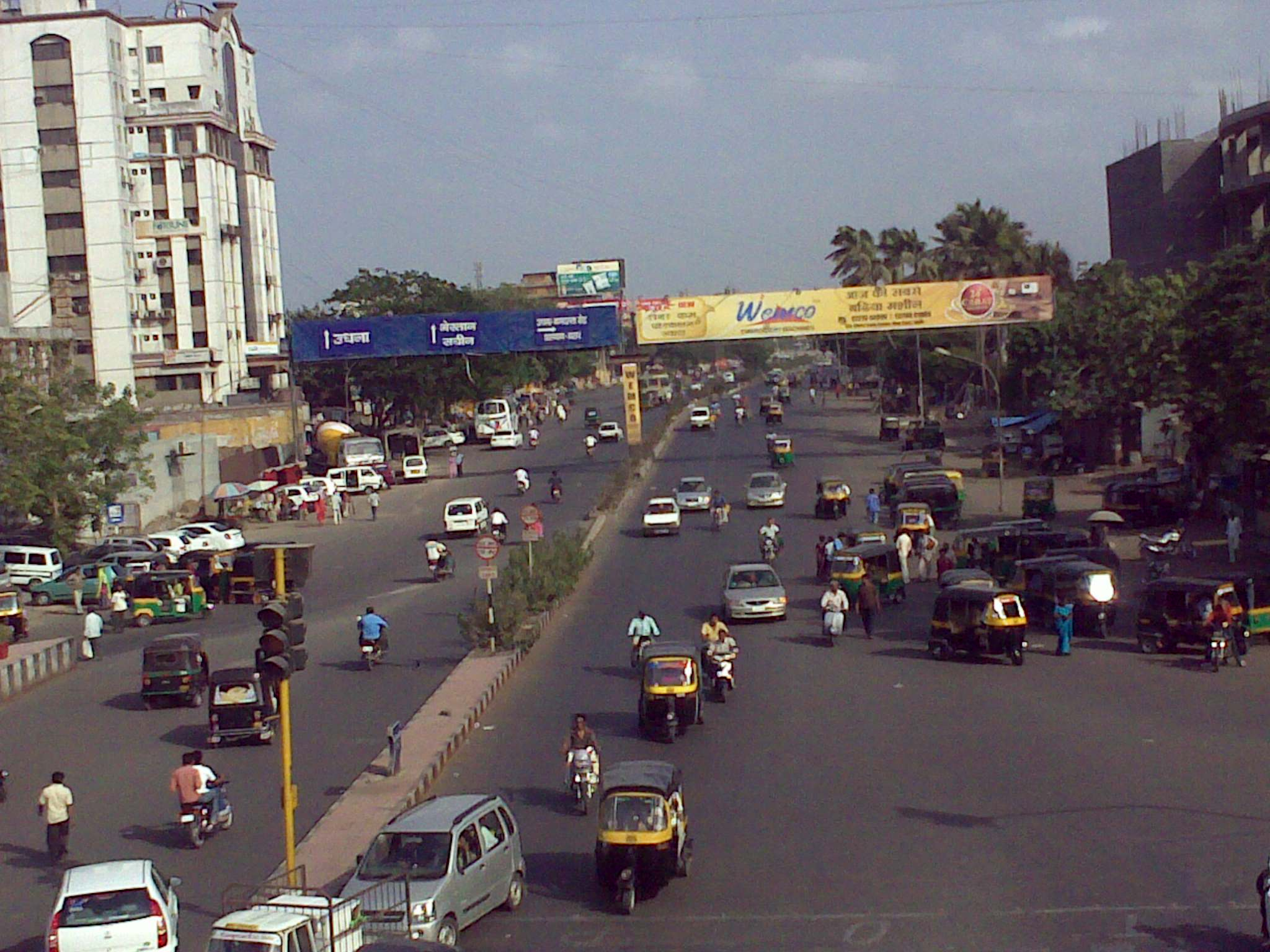
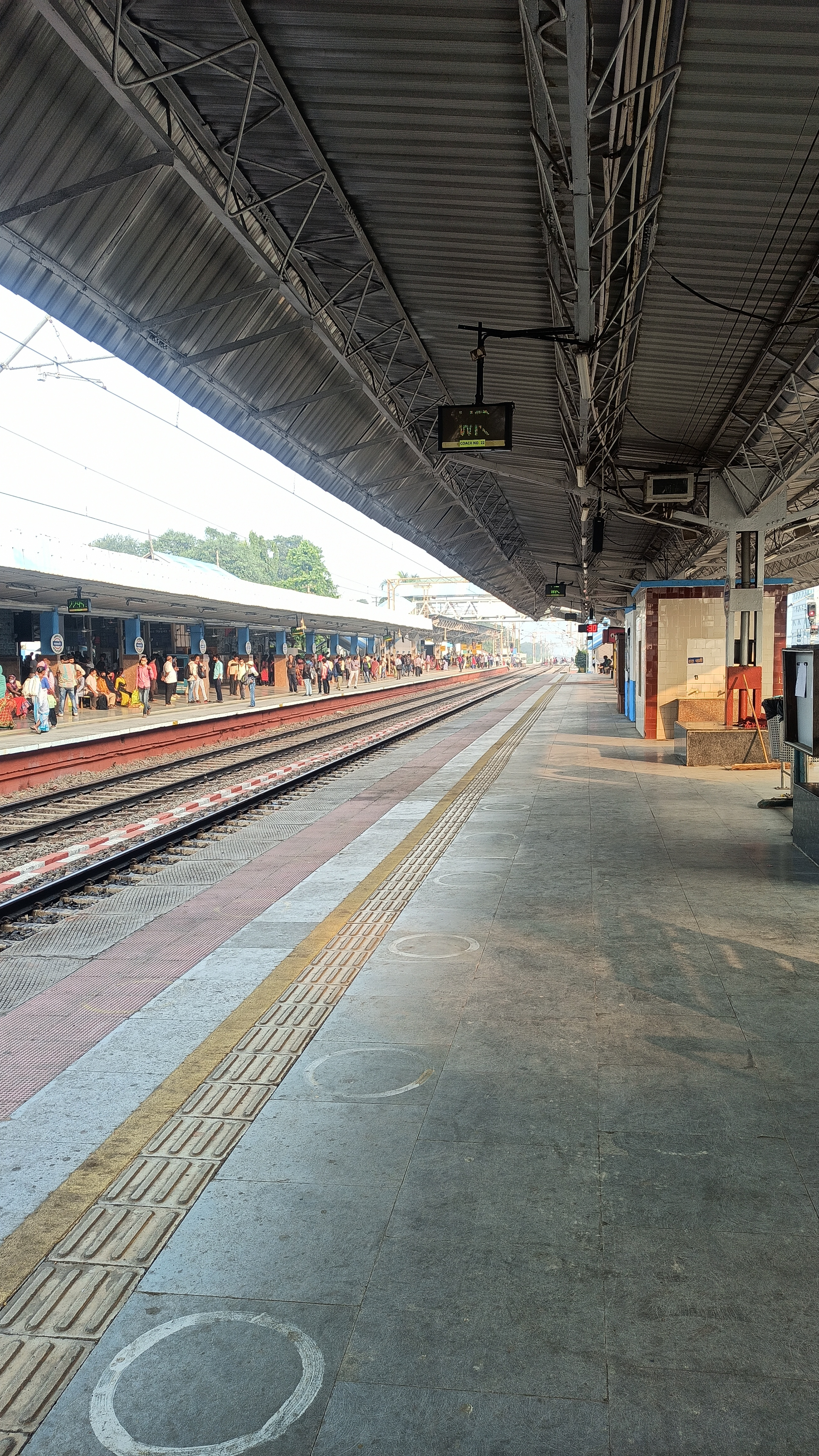
- skyline of Navsari, Busy Road in Navsari, Railway Platform Navsari

- Location in Gujarat, India
- Coordinates: 20.95°N 72.93°E
- Country: India
- State: Gujarat
- District: Navsari

Government
  - Type: Municipal Corporation
  - Body: Navsari Municipal Corporation

Area
  - City: 43.71 km^{2} (16.88 sq mi)
- Elevation: 9 m (30 ft)

Population (2011)
  - City: 171,109
  - Rank: 10th
  - Density: 3,915/km^{2} (10,140/sq mi)
  - Metro: 292,719

Languages
  - Official: Gujarati, Hindi, English
- Time zone: UTC+5:30 (IST)
- PIN: 396445
- Telephone code: 02637
- Vehicle registration: GJ-21
- Website: https://navsari.nic.in/

Navsari is the ninth biggest city in the state of Gujarat in India. It is the administrative headquarters of Navsari District. Navsari is between Surat and Mumbai. It is a twin city of Surat, 37 km to the south. At the 2011 Census of India, Navsari was the 16th biggest city of Gujarat state. It ranked 10th most populous city of Gujarat in the 1991 Census of India and 2001 Census of India. Dandi village near Navsari was the focal point of the great Salt March led by Mahatma Gandhi during civil disobedience movement of India.

== History ==
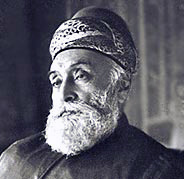
Jamsetji Tata, the person behind Tata Group and a major Parsi businessman from Navsari.

Navsari was originally known as "Navasarika", and was the capital of a vishaya (an administrative unit) in the Lata region. It is identified with "Nusaripa", a city mentioned in Ptolemy's 2nd century Greek-language work Geography.

The Chalukyas of Navasarika, who governed the area around Navsari as subordinates of the Chalukyas of Vatapi, repulsed an Umayyad invasion of the area in 738–739 CE.

According to the Parsi tradition, in 1142 CE, when they first came to Navsari, the city was named Nag Mandal. The Parsis found the city's atmosphere similar to that of the Sari region of Iran. In the Persian language, "nav" means new, and "Sari" refers to the region in Iran, hence the name Nav Sari. Two families of Parsi Zoroastrian priests settled in Navsari in the early 13th century, and the town soon emerged as the main centre of the Parsi priesthood and religious authority. As the Parsi community grew at other places in India, the priests from Navsari were sought by the new Parsi settlements throughout the country. It is the home of the Bhagarsath Atash Behram established in 1765 CE. Surat replaced Navsari as the principal settlement of the Parsi community in the 18th century, following its rise as a major trade centre for the European factories, and the Maratha incursions into Surat; Surat itself lost this position to Bombay in the later years.

== Geography ==
Navsari is located at 20.95°N 72.93°E. It has an average elevation of 9 metres or 30 feet above sea level. The city is located in southern Gujarat and is situated near the Purna River, within a few kilometres of the river's delta, which is west of the city and empties into the Gulf of Khambhat. The weather in Navsari is sunny from October to May, and rainy from June to September. The average maximum and minimum temperatures are 42 °C (107.6 °F) and 17 °C (62.6 °F) respectively. The average annual rainfall is 122 cm (48 in).

== Demographics ==
The city's first settlers were the Chalukyas, followed by the Rashtrakutas, and subsequent settlements by the Parsis.

According to the 2011 census, Navsari had a population of 171,109. Males constituted 52% of the population and females 48%. Navsari had an average literacy rate of 88%, higher than the national average of 74%: male literacy was 92%, and female literacy was 84%. 10% of the population was under 6 years of age.

Gujarati is the main language spoken in Navsari. The other languages spoken are Hindi & English.

== Landmarks ==
The Sayaji Vaibhav Public Library Navsari is an important public building in Navsari.

The Meherjirana library.

This is one of the oldest libraries in the South Gujarat Region. It was established by the first Dastur (Parsi/Zoroastrian priest) Meherji Rana, who was also born in Navsari. He was invited by Akbar in a religious program organised by the Great Akbar. Leaders of all religious groups participated in it. Akbar asked to start a conversation and eventually asked to give information about their religion. All the religious leaders gave information about their religions and gradually tried to show their religions as great except Dastur Meherjirana. Afterward, the leaders asked Akbar his opinion as to whose religion is great. Akbar was really impressed by Dastur Meherjirana, so he asked him. Meherjirana Dastur calmly replied, "All religions are equal in terms of strength and ideology and principle". Akbar was extremely impressed by his personality. He donated a piece of land to Dastur Meherjirana in Navsari, where today The Meherjirana Library stands. Akbar wrote on a scroll about the donation of land which is still preserved by the management of the library.

Dandi

The Dandi seashore is an important location from the point of view of India's Independence Movement. In 1930 Mahatma Gandhi started the "Dandi March" from Sabarmati Ashram up to the Dandi seashore to protest against a tax on salt by the colonial government.

Ajmalgadh

Though it is surrounded by high hills, this is a historical place. Zoroastrians/Parsis roamed in the forest and cave of Ajmalgadh to save and protect their sacred fire-cauldron for nearly 250–350 years. Recently, the local administration constructed a pillar on the hill of Ajmalgadh describing the story. They also closed the cave which was used to protect the holy fire.

The National Salt Satyagraha Memorial, Dandi

The National Salt Satyagraha Memorial in Dandi, Navsari commemorates the historic Salt March of 1930, led by Mahatma Gandhi. It features a statue of Gandhi, 24 narrative murals depicting the march, and solar evaporation ponds where visitors can learn about salt production.

== Transportation ==
The nearest domestic and international airport is Surat International Airport at Magdalla, Surat, 27 km. There are other two airports nearby, Vadodara Airport, 178 km north from the Navsari city & Chhatrapati Shivaji Maharaj International Airport, 239 km south-west from Navsari city.

Navsari also lies on the Mumbai-Delhi railway link, one of the busiest railway routes in India.

Navsari is well connected by NH 64 also known as Sabarmati-Dandi Highway. NH 48 also passes through the city. Navsari is only 30 km south of Surat.

== Education ==
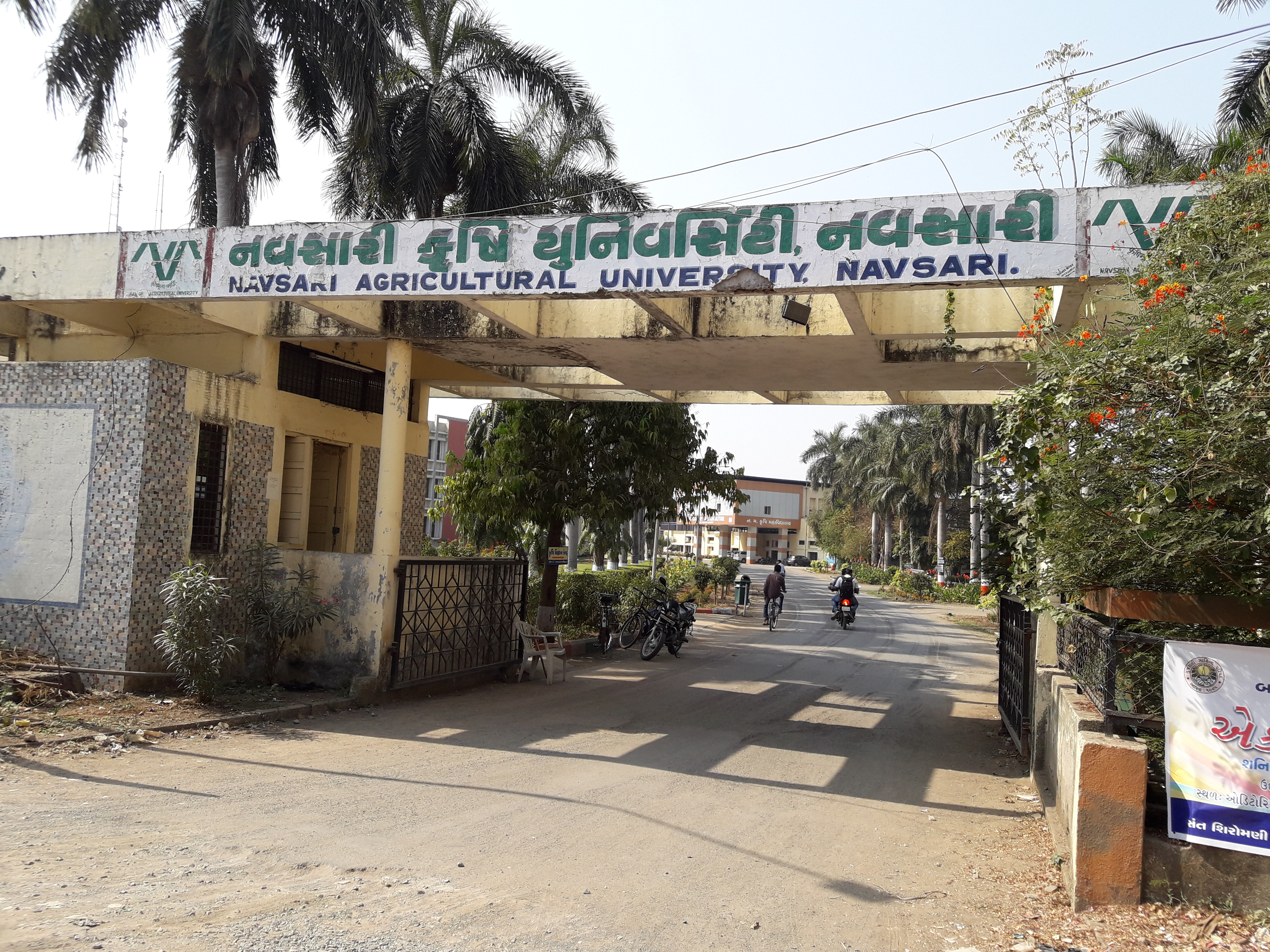
Navsari Agriculture University

=== Universities and colleges ===
==== Agriculture Universities and colleges ====
- Navsari Agricultural University
- Horticulture Polytechnic, Navsari
- N. M. College of Agriculture, Navsari
- ASPEE College of Horticulture and Forestry, Navsari
- College Of Agricultural Engineering, Navsari
- Agribusiness Management Institute (AABMI)

==== Engineering Universities and colleges ====
- Mahatma Gandhi Inst. of Technical Education and Research
- GIDC Degree Engineering College

==== Arts & Commerce Universities and colleges ====
- Naranlala College Of Commerce And Management
- Vallabhbudhi Polytechnic, Navsari
- Sorabji Burjorji Garda Arts College
- B.P. Baria Science College
- Navsari Agricultural University
- P.K. Patel Commerce College
- S.S. Agrawal College of Arts and Commerce, Navsari
- S.S. Agrawal College of Nursing Training College and Research Centre, Navsari
- S.S. Agrawal Institute of Management and Technology, Navsari
- S.S. Agrawal Homeyopathic Collage, Navsari
- B.D. Gohil, Navsari.
- Dinshaw Daboo Law College
- District Institute of Education and Training, Navsari - B. Ed. College

=== Schools ===
- Savitaben Girdharlal Mayachand Shiroiya Senior Secondary School
- A B Higher Secondary School - Partapore
- A B School - Chikhli
- A B SCHOOL - Partapore
- Akhil Hind Mahila Parishad High School
- Bai Navajbai Tata Girls' High School
- Bai Navajbai Tata Zoroastrian Girls School
- Bhakta Ashram
- Dadabhau Kawasji Tata High School
- Dinbai Daboo Girls High School
- Divine Public School
- Hamara school
- Hemali English Primary & Modern English Secondary & Higher Secondary School
- Late G.C Patel Vidhyalaya
- Mamta Mandir
- Naranlala Higher Secondary School
- Podar International School, Navsari
- R.D Patel Sarvajanik High School
- Real English School
- Sanskar bharti, Navsari
- Seth Banatwala High School
- Seth P.H. Vidyalaya (Sanskarbharti)
- Seth R.J.J. High School
- Seventh-Day Adventist English School
- Seventh Day English School, Shyam Nagar, Navsari
- Sheth H.C. Parekh, Navsari High School
- Shree Sardar Patel Vidhya Bhavan, Jalalpore
- Shree Sardar Sharda Mandir, Vijalpore
- Sir C.J. Navsari Zarthosti Madresa High School
- Sir Jamshetji Jeejeebhoy English medium high school
- Sri Sathya Sai Vidyaniketan, Ganeshvad Sisodra
- Tapovan SanskarDham Vidhyalaya
- The Navsari High School
- The Simlak Muslim Education Institute, Simlak, Jalapore
- The Vidyakunj High School

== Hospitals ==
- Anand Hospital
- Civil Hospital, Navsari
- Daboo Hospital
- Dhruvini Nursing Home & Iccu
- Dorabji Nanabhoy Mehta Sarvajanik Hospital
- K.D.N. Gohil Hospital
- Kejal Lifein Multispeciality Hospital
- Lions Hospital
- MAA cancer Hospital
- Maroliya hospital for women
- Mulla Hospital
- Nirali cancer research hospital
- Nirali Hospital
- Orange Hospital
- Parmar Hospital
- Ramaben Hospital
- Rotary Eye Institute
- Shraddha Hospital
- Shushrusha Hospital
- Surbhi Hospital
- Unity Hospital, Navsari
- Yashfin Hospital

Advance orthopedic hospital

== Notable people ==
- Kurush Deboo, Indian film actor, famous for Munnabhai M.B.B.S. was born in Navsari
- K. B. Desai, Indian independence activist, medical doctor, Navsari Congress leader and President of Navsari Municipal Council
- Prakash K. Desai, Air Marshal of Indian Air Force
- Ram Ganesh Gadkari (1885–1919), Marathi poet, playwright, and humourist
- Hiralal Jairam, cricketer
- Jamsetjee Jejeebhoy, merchant and philanthropist
- Ketan Mehta, Indian film director who has also directed documentaries and television serials
- A. M. Naik, Chairman of Larsen & Toubro Limited
- Dadabhai Naoroji, known as the "Grand Old Man of India", Member of Parliament (MP) in the House of Commons of the United Kingdom between 1892 and 1895
- Jeetan Patel (1980), New - Zealand international Cricketer of Indian Origin.
- C. R. Patil (born 1955), Member of Parliament, Lok Sabha, for the Navsari Constituency and President of BJP Gujarat State
- Meherji Rana, spiritual leader of the Parsi community in India
- Jamsetji Tata, founder of what would later become the Tata Group of companies, regarded as the "father of Indian industry"
- Homai Vyarawalla (1913–2012), first woman photojournalist of India, Padma Vibushan
